= Reconnaissance Groups of the French Army, 1939-40 =

Type of French military unit during World War II

Depiction of French cavalrymen gathered around the insignia of the 44th Divisional Reconnaissance Group (44e GRDI).

The Reconnaissance Group (Groupe de Reconnaissance, GR) was a type of cavalry formation created by the French army during the Second World War from 1939 to 1940. Ranging in size from a reinforced battalion to a regiment, they were attached to infantry divisions as a divisional reconnaissance group (Groupe de Reconnaissance de Division d’Infanterie, GRDI) or to corps as an Army Corps Reconnaissance Group (Groupe de Reconnaissance de Corps d’Armée, GRCA). Mounted on horse or motorcycle, and sometimes equipped with armored cars and tanks, the reconnaissance groups were highly mobile formations, and were often grouped together in ad-hoc cavalry formations to combat the fast-moving German panzer units during the Battle of France.

== Mission ==
During the interwar period, the French cavalry arm conceived of its mission as being composed of three principal elements: Discovery (découverte), security (sureté) and combat.

Découverte referred to long-range reconnaissance and information-gathering well in advance of the main body of the unit, requiring fast and autonomous mobile units which were expected to operate primarily using the road network. Vehicles intended for this role, the Automitrailleuses de Découverte, or AMD, were generally wheeled armored cars. In 1940 the Panhard AMD 35 was the preferred AMD of the French cavalry.

Sûreté referred to reconnaissance and security activities that were essential to the movement and deployment of the main body of the unit; these tasks included scouting directly in advance of the main body, flank protection, identification and occupation of key terrain, and initial contact with the enemy. Vehicles intended for this role, the Automitrailleuses de Reconnaissance, or AMR, were generally small, lightly-armed tracked vehicles, with an emphasis placed on low profile and all-terrain mobility. While the Renault AMR 33 and AMR 35 were intended for this role, they were not available in sufficient numbers to equip the Reconnaissance Groups, so older armored cars like the Schneider P 16 were typically employed.

Combat was the direct intervention of the cavalry unit in battle designed to produce a shock effect through the combination of firepower and mobility. The Automitrailleuses de Combat, or AMC, were meant to combine sufficient protection and mobility to engage and destroy enemy armored vehicles. Development of the AMC would culminate in the SOMUA S 35 cavalry tank. While the GR were not intended to fulfill the combat role, which was reserved for heavier cavalry units, a few GRDI nevertheless fielded Hotchkiss light tanks in the AMR role.

== Employment ==
French doctrine of the 1930s stated that the reconnaissance group was intended to provide reconnaissance and intelligence-gathering capability to its parent unit. Further, the GR was responsible for providing flank security during movement, and with securing key terrain ahead of the main formation, particularly with an eye to preventing incursions by enemy armor.

Manuals defined the role of the GR thusly: “Motorized Army Corps and Infantry Divisions are equipped with fully motorized reconnaissance groups, designed to carry out security missions on behalf of these larger units—missions normally assigned to cavalry. Among these missions, long-range security is of critical importance when facing an adversary that also possesses a high degree of mobility."

The reconnaissance group was assigned four major tasks:

- Intelligence gathering
- Providing cover against incursions by armored vehicles
- Occupying key points within their areas of operation
- Reconnaissance of the road network, with a view to its use by motorized columns

Intelligence gathering was entrusted to the AMDs and motorcyclists, deployed along the road network. These mobile units were expected to provide reconnaissance over an area extending 80 to 100 km in advance of the main body of the unit. Motorcycle detachments, supported by machine guns and anti-tank weapons, were to provide advance warning and protection against enemy incursions. In the event of enemy attack, these advance guards were to concentrate their resistance at key road nodes and make use of obstacles and destruction (i.e. of bridges) to delay the enemy advance. The defensive action of the GR was intended to break the enemy's momentum and deny them the element of surprise.

The main body of the reconnaissance group, operating behind the advance guard but ahead of the parent formation, was entrusted with occupying key terrain and securing possible chokepoints, to facilitate the maneuver of the larger unit. For these tasks the GR was to be reinforced as required by motorized infantry and artillery elements from the division or corps. The reconnaissance group was also responsible for screening the flanks of the unit during maneuver.

Working in conjunction with engineer and transport units, the GR was to undertake reconnaissance of the road network to determine its suitability for movement and identify bridges and crossing points across waterways.

In defensive combat, the reconnaissance group was tasked with monitoring enemy movements, in order to thwart enemy flanking attempts or threaten the enemy's own flank. When attacked head-on, the GR was intended to conduct a delaying action.

== Composition ==
In order to carry out their mission, the reconnaissance groups combined armored cars, motorcycle-mounted troops, and horse-mounted cavalry. There were two basic types, the Army Corps Reconnaissance Group (Groupe de Reconnaissance de Corps d’Armée, GRCA), and the Divisional Reconnaissance Group (Groupe de Reconnaissance de Division d’Infanterie, GRDI), which was attached to an infantry division.

The GRCA and GRDI were constructed from the same basic elements, with the number and type of squadron differing depending on the recon group structure and mission.

The horse-mounted Escadron à Cheval totaled 190 officers and men, divided into four platoons and a machine gun group, plus a 60mm mortar. Each platoon was subdivided into two combat groups, each consisting of a scout squad (five mounted riflemen, armed with either the 8mm Berthier mousqueton or 7.5mm MAS 36, one equipped with a rifle grenade discharger) and a fusilier squad (six men: five riflemen and one 7.5mm MAC FM 24/29 light machine gunner). An additional fusilier squad was at the direct disposition of the platoon leader. Each platoon totaled 34 officers and men. The machine gun group consisted of two Hotchkiss mle 1914 8mm machineguns and 25 men, with 9 men per gun team, and there was an additional Hotchkiss intended for air defense. Eight men were assigned to the 60mm Brandt mle 1935 light mortar.

The motorcycle-mounted Escadron de Fusiliers-Motocyclistes consisted of 150 men divided into four platoons plus a mortar team. Each platoon was split into two combat groups, each consisting of two four-man fusilier squads, with three riflemen and one FM 24/29 gunner each. Each platoon consisted of 26 men, intended to be transported by 13 motorcycles outfitted with sidecars. Four men manned the 60mm mortar.

The weapons squadron or Escadron de Mitrailleuses et Canons consisted of two machine gun platoons, each totaling 29 men and four Hotchkiss mle 1914s, divided into groups of two, and an anti-tank gun group, with two 25mm Hotchkiss SA 34 anti-tank guns, each manned by a team of 9 men. Each machine gun platoon also had an additional Hotchkiss intended for air defense. These heavy weapons were transported by light truck (camionette) with the rest of the personnel mounted on motorcycles.

The AMD (Automitrailleuse de Découverte) squadron was organized in four platoons of three armored cars each, the intended vehicle for this role was the Panhard 178 AMD 35. The squadron leader was also mounted in an armored car, and typically there would be a 14^{th} vehicle assigned to the commander of the group of squadrons (GED).

The AMR (Automitrailleuse de Reconnaissance) squadron was intended to consist of four platoons of five AMR 33s or AMR 35s, however, a shortage of these vehicles meant that the Schneider P 16 had to be substituted. Under this arrangement, AMR squadrons typically had three platoons of four P 16s, with a 13^{th} vehicle for the squadron leader and a 14^{th} vehicle for the group commander.

In units where the AMR squadron was replaced by a Hotchkiss H 35 or H 39 light tank squadron, the squadron was organized into four platoons of three tanks each, with a 13^{th} vehicle for the squadron leader and a 14^{th} vehicle for the group commander.

The Escadron Hors-Rang (EHR) was the logistics/support squadron for the group, providing supply, transport, maintenance, and medical services to the unit. In units with armored vehicles, two additional vehicles of each type were held in reserve (au volant) with the repair and maintenance section of the EHR for use as replacements.

=== GRCA ===
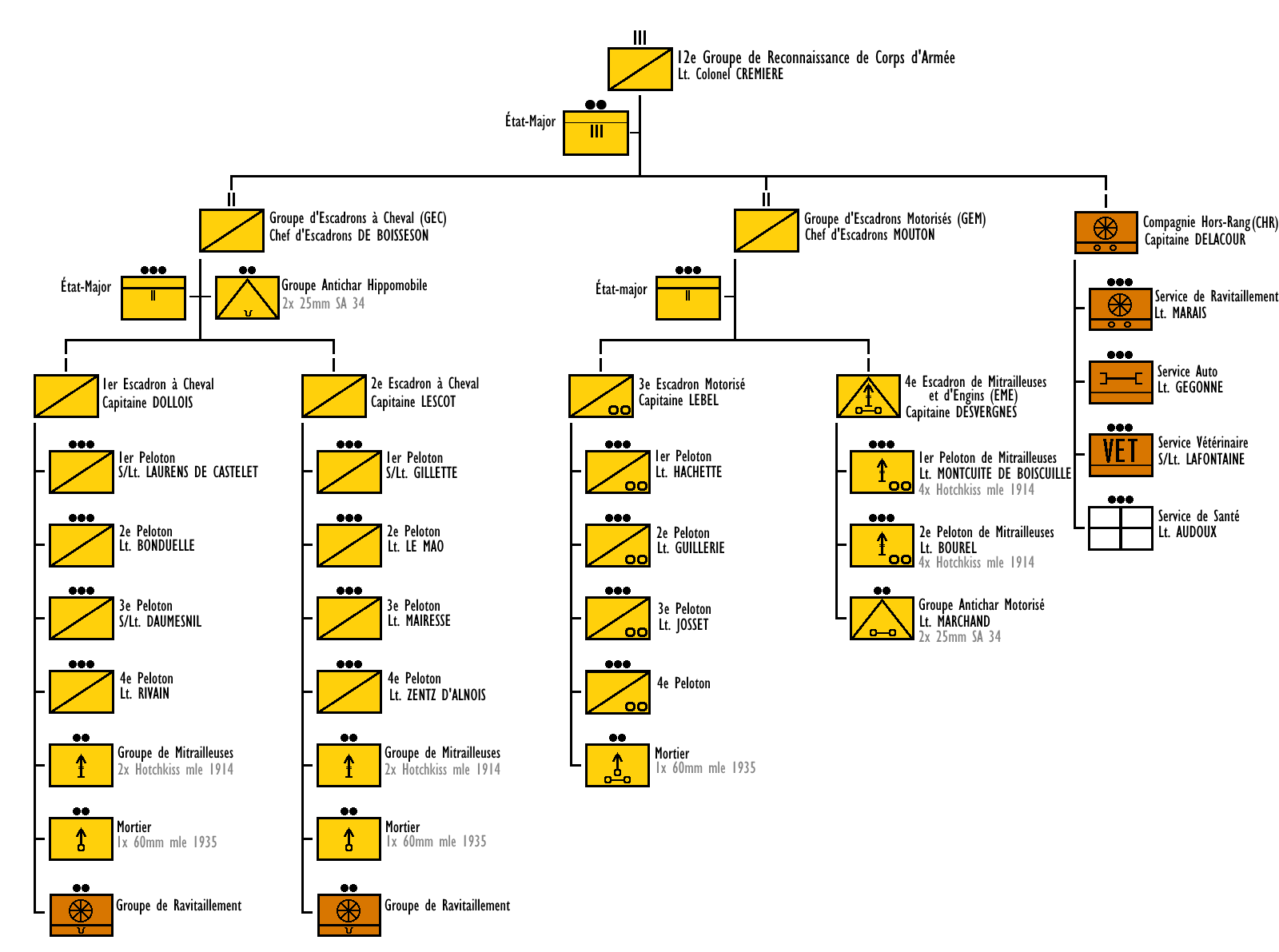
The 12e GRCA wass a typical partially-motorized unit.

The typical GRCA was under the command of a colonel or lieutenant-colonel and split into two groups of squadrons, a Groupe d’Escadrons a Cheval (GEC), composed of two squadrons on horseback, and a Groupe d’Escadrons Motorisés (GEM), combining a motorcycle-mounted squadron and a motorized heavy weapons group (Escadron de Mitrailleuses et Canons, EMC or Escadron de Mitrailleuses et Engins, EME) which provided additional firepower in the form of crew-served weapons, including Hotchkiss machineguns and 25mm anti-tank guns. The horse-mounted element had its own group of horse-drawn anti-tank guns (two 25mm guns). A logistics and sustainment squadron (Escadron Hors-Rang, EHR) provided logistical, medical, maintenance and veterinary services for the unit.

A GRCA could also be fully motorized; this was the case for the 1re GRCA, 2e GRCA and 3e GRCA, which were attached to the motorized and mechanized corps of the French army. In this case, the horse-mounted GEC was replaced by a Groupe d’Escadrons de Fusiliers Motocyclistes (GEFM) composed of two motorcycle squadrons, and a Groupe d’Escadrons de Fusiliers Motocyclistes et de Mitrailleuses et Canons Anti-Chars, composed of one motorcycle squadron and one heavy weapons group, reinforced with a second section of 25mm anti-tank guns, to replace the horse-drawn anti-tank group from the typical GRCA. The Escadron Hors-Rang was also fully motorized in this case, with additional resources for auto maintenance and fuel supply. The on-paper strength of a motorized GRCA was 823 officers and men.

=== GRDI ===
A typical Divisional Reconnaissance Group or GRDI was slightly smaller than the GRCA. Commanded by a lieutenant-colonel or Chef d’Escadrons, it was composed of one motorcycle squadron (Escadron de Fusiliers Motocyclistes), one squadron on horseback (Escadron à Cheval), a heavy weapons squadron (Escadron de Mitrailleuses et Canons Anti-Chars, EMC) and an Escadron Hors-Rang (EHR) providing logistical services. A horse-drawn anti-tank group was at the disposal of the GRDI command element, and logically would work in tandem with the horse-mounted element. A typical GRDI had an on-paper strength of 678 officers and men.

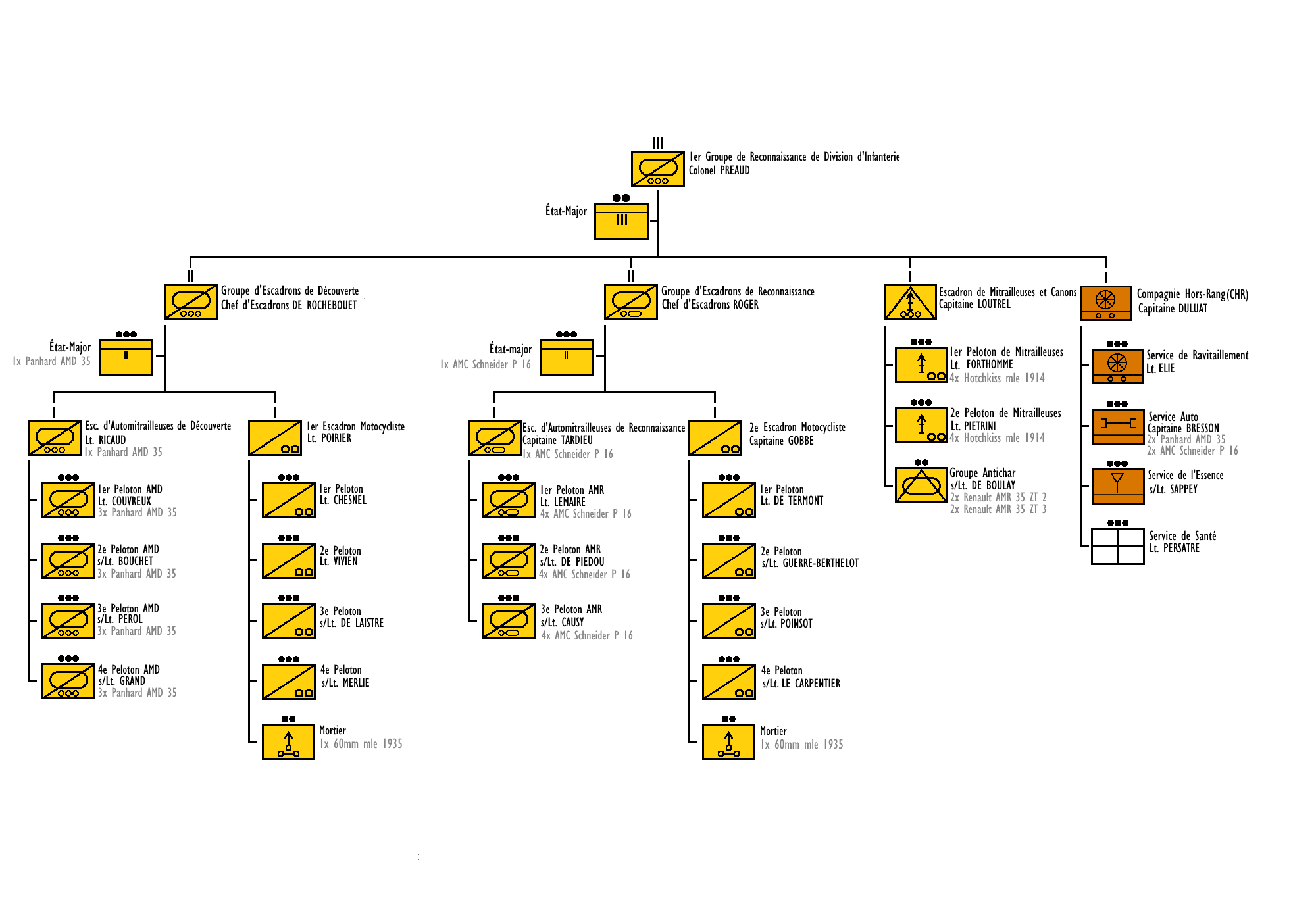
The 1er GRDI was a fully-motorized unit equipped with Panhard AMD 35 and Schneider P 16 armored cars.

Five GRDI, attached to the motorized infantry divisions, were motorized and equipped with armored vehicles. These units were organized into two groups of squadrons, with the heavy weapons squadron independent. The Groupe d’Escadrons de Découverte (GED) was composed of one AMD armored car squadron (Escadron d’Automitrailleuses de Découverte), equipped with Panhard AMD 35s, and a motorcycle squadron. The Groupe d’Escadrons de Reconnaissance (GER) was composed of an AMR squadron (Escadron d’Automitrailleuses de Reconnaissance) and a motorcycle squadron. The heavy weapons squadron included an armored anti-tank section equipped with two AMR 35 ZT 2 and two AMR 35 ZT 3 vehicles armed with 25mm cannon. These vehicles were delivered just days before the German invasion of France and the Low Countries. The EHR was fully motorized.

On paper, the AMR squadron of the motorized GRDI was meant to be equipped with AMR 33 or AMR 35 tracked light reconnaissance vehicles, however in practice a shortage of these machines meant that alternatives had to be found. Typically the Schneider P 16 armored half-track filled this role, although for the 2e GRDI and 5e GRDI Hotchkiss light tanks were used instead. The on-paper manpower of a motorized GRDI outfitted with Schneider or Hotchkiss vehicles was 666 officers and men.

==== GRRF ====
Three GRDI were assigned to support fortified regions, the military units responsible for the Maginot Line fortifications. These units were thus referred to as Fortified Region Reconnaissance Groups (Groupe de Reconnaissance de Région Fortifiée, GRRF). Their organization was identical to the regular GRDI, with the exception of the 44e GRRF, which had a single platoon of obsolete White-Laffly AM 50 armored cars.

==== Polish Army in France ====
The Polish Army in France was modeled on French lines, thus the Polish infantry divisions formed their own GRDI which were organized in the same manner as the French divisions.

==== Overseas (Outre-Mer) type GRDI ====
For divisions that were intended to remain in France’s colonies and overseas territories, the GR was organized differently, being smaller and with fewer motor vehicles. The Outre-Mer type GRDI consisted of two horse-mounted squadrons and one EMC. The Escadron Hors-Rang was reduced to a single platoon. In the French mandates of Syria and Lebanon, the two GRDI formed (191e and 192e GRDI) also had a unique organization. These units were each composed of a GEH consisting of two horse-mounted squadrons, a machine gun platoon, and a 25mm anti-tank group, with the addition of an armored car (AM) squadron taken from the 8e Groupe d’Automitrailleuses (8e GAM). Each also had a squadron of indigenous Circassian cavalry attached. Each AM squadron had seven Panhard 165/175 TOE armored cars.

==== Reduced and ad-hoc formations ====
During the later stages of the Battle of France, the French high command attempted to replace formations destroyed during the month of May 1940 with new, smaller Light Infantry Divisions (DLI). These were formed by combining surviving elements of shattered units with replacement and rear-area formations. The GRDI attached to the DLI were likewise formed from the remnants of GRDI and GRCA which had suffered heavy losses in May, reinforced with elements drawn from Gendarmerie units and cavalry depots. Exact composition varied, but in general these reduced GRDI were fully motorized and roughly squadron-sized, with two motorcycle platoons, one porté platoon of truck-mounted infantry, and one group of 25mm anti-tank guns. Overseas-type GRDI were reduced to two squadrons: One horse cavalry squadron and one EMC.

==== Armored Division Reconnaissance Groups ====
It was intended that the three armored divisions (Divisions Cuirassés) of the French army also receive reconnaissance groups; these would have been the 131e, 132e, and 133e GR, with elements drawn from the 7e Régiment de Dragons Portés. Due to the German invasion these units were never formed.

== Mobilization ==
Upon mobilization, the reconnaissance groups were created by breaking up peacetime cavalry regiments and armored car groups to provide a trained core of officers and NCOs for the GRs, which were then filled out with reservists and conscripts from the cavalry mobilization centers (CMC, or CMCA if in North Africa).

== List of Army Corps Reconnaissance Groups (GRCA) ==
GRCA	Type	Parent Unit/Mobilization Center	Corps	Notes	References
1er GRCA	Motorized	CMC 2 - Compiègne	IIe CA		
2e GRCA	Motorized	7th Cuirassier Regiment (7e RC) CMC 3 - Evreux	Ie CA		
3e GRCA	Motorized	CMC 5 - Orléans	Ve CA		
6e GRCA	Normal	7th Cuirassier Regiment (7e RC) CMC 3 - Evreux	IIIe CA		
7e GRCA	Normal	CMC 4 - Alençon	IVe CA		
8e GRCA	Normal	30th Dragoon Regiment (30e RD) CMC 26 - Epernay	VIe CA		
9e GRCA	Normal	11th Chasseurs à Cheval Regiment (11e RCC) CMC 7 - Vesoul, Lure & Montbeliard	VIIe CA		
10e GRCA	Normal	9th Dragoon Regiment (9e RD) CMC 8 - Beaune CMC 26 - Epernay	VIIIe CA		
11e GRCA	Normal	CMC 9 - Niort	IXe CA		
12e GRCA	Normal	CMC 24 - Dinan	Xe CA		
13e GRCA	Normal	CMC 17 - Montauban	XVIIe CA		
14e GRCA	Normal	CMC 3 - Saint-Lô CMC 61 - Saint-Germain-en-Laye	XXIe CA		
15e GRCA	Normal	3rd Hussar Regiment (3e RH) CMC 20 - Sarreguemines & Baccarat	XXe CA		
16e GRCA	Normal	2nd Hussar Regiment (2e RH) CMC 18 - Tarbes	XVIIIe CA		
17e GRCA	Normal	2nd Hussar Regiment (2e RH) CMC 11 - Pontivy	XIe CA		
18e GRCA	Normal	CMC 16 - Carcassonne	XVIe CA		
19e GRCA	Normal	Cavalry Depot 29 - Limoges CODP (Personnel Organization Center) Angers	XXIIIe CA		
20e GRCA	Normal	9th Cuirassier Regiment (9e RC) CMC 14 - Lyon	XIVe CA		
21e GRCA	Normal	10th Dragoon Regiment (10e RD) CMC 15 - Tarascon	XVe CA		
22e GRCA	Normal	CM 3 - Saint-Lô CM 61 - Pontoise	CA Colonial		
23e GRCA	Normal	20th Dragoon Regiment (20e RD) CMC 13 - Moulins CMC 29 - Limoges	XIIIe CA		
24e GRCA	Normal	CMC 29 - Bellac	XIIe CA		
25e GRCA	Normal	65e GRDI Cavalry Depot 21 - Rambouillet	XXIVe CA		

== List of Divisional and Fortified Region Reconnaissance Groups (GRDI & GRRF) ==
GRDI/GRRF	Type	Parent Unit/Mobilization Center	Division/Fortified Region	Notes	References
1er GRDI	Motorized	7th Cuirassier Regiment (7e RC) CMC 3 - Evreux	5th Motorized Infantry Division (5e DIM)		
2e GRDI	Motorized	20th Dragoon Regiment (20e RD) CMC 5 - Orléans CMC 29 - Limoges	9th Motorized Infantry Division (9e DIM)		
3e GRDI	Motorized	9th Dragoon Regiment (9e RD) CMC 26 - Epernay	12th Motorized Infantry Division (12e RD)		
4e GRDI	Motorized	11th Chasseurs à Cheval Regiment (11e RCC) CMC 7 - Vesoul	15th Motorized Infantry Division (15e DIM)		
5e GRDI	Motorized	10th Dragoon Regiment (10e RD) CMC 13 - Moulins CMC 15 - Orange	25th Motorized Infantry Division (25e DIM)		
6e GRDI	Motorized	6th Armored Car Group (6e GAM) CMC 2 - Compiègne	3rd Motorized Infantry Division (3e DIM)		
7e GRDI	Motorized	7th Armored Car Group (7e GAM) CMC 1 - Saint-Omer	1st Motorized Infantry Division (1re DIM)		
8e GRDI	Normal	85e GRDI	17th Infantry Division (17e DI)	Formed March 1940.	
11e GRDI	Normal	CMC 1 - Saint-Omer	2nd Infantry Division (2e DI)		
12e GRDI	Normal	CMC 2 - Compiègne	4th Infantry Division (4e DI)		
13e GRDI	Normal	CMC 3 - Evreux	6th Infantry Division (6e DI)		
14e GRDI	Normal	CMC 13 - Moulins	26th Infantry Division (26e DI)		
15e GRDI	Normal	7th Chasseurs à Cheval Regiment (7e RCC) CMC 3 - Evreux CMC 61 - Saint-Germain-en Laye	10th Infantry Division (10e DI)		
16e GRDI	Normal	3rd Hussar Regiment (3e RH) CMC 20 - Nancy	11th Infantry Division (11e DI)		
17e GRDI	Normal	11th Chasseurs à Cheval Regiment (11e RCC) 13th Chasseurs à Cheval Regiment (13e RCC) CMC 7 - Vesoul	13th Infantry Division (13e DI)		
18e GRDI	Normal	20th Dragoon Regiment (20e RD) CMC 29 - Limoges	23rd Infantry Division (23e DI)		
19e GRDI	Normal	CMC 8 - Beaune	16th Infantry Division (16e DI)		
20e GRDI	Normal	9th Cuirassier Regiment (9e RC) CMC 14 - Lyon	27th Alpine Infantry Division (27e DIAlp)		
21e GRDI	Normal	20th Dragoon Regiment (20e RD) CMC 19 - Saint-Omer	19th Infantry Division (19e DI)		
22e GRDI	Normal	9th Cuirassier Regiment (9e RC) CMC 14 - Lyon	28th Alpine Infantry Division (28e DIAlp)		
23e GRDI	Normal	2nd Hussar Regiment (2e RH) CMC 16 - Carcassonne CMC 18 - Tarbes	31st Alpine Infantry Division (31e DIAlp)		
24e GRDI	Normal	CMC 11 - Pontivy	22nd Infantry Division (22e DI)		
25e GRDI	Normal	11th Chasseurs à Cheval Regiment (11e RCC) CMC 7 - Vesoul	14th Infantry Division (14e DI)		
26e GRDI	Normal	10th Dragoon Regiment (10e RD) CMC 15 - Orange	30th Alpine Infantry Division (30e DIAlp)		
27e GRDI	Normal	20th Dragoon Regiment (20e RD) CMC 11 - Pontivy CMC 29 - Limoges	21st Infantry Division (21e DI)		
28e GRDI	Normal	CMC 29 - Limoges	24th Infantry Division (24e DI)		
29e GRDI	Normal	CMC 18 - Tarbes	35th Infantry Division (35e DI)		
30e GRDI	Normal	CMC 9 - Angers	18th Infantry Division (18e DI)		
31e GRDI	Normal	CMC 24 - Dinan	20th Infantry Division (20e DI)		
32e GRDI	Normal	3rd Hussar Regiment (3e RH) CMC 20 - Nancy	43rd Infantry Division (43e DI)	Attached platoon of five AMD 35s from the 542nd Platoon of the Gendarmerie.	
33e GRDI	Normal	CMC 5 - Orléans CMC 9 - Angers	45th Infantry Division (45e DI)		
34e GRDI	Normal	10th Dragoon Regiment (10e RD) CMC 15 - Orange	29th Infantry Division (29e DI)		
35e GRDI	Normal	CMC 7 - Vesoul	47th Infantry Division (47e DI)		
36e GRDI	Normal	CMC 3 - Evreux CMC 41 - Melun	41st Infantry Division (41e DI)		
37e GRDI	Normal	30th Dragoon Regiment (30e RD) CMC 26 - Epernay	42nd Infantry Division (42e DI)		
38e GRDI	Normal	CMC 16 - Carcassonne CMC 17 - Montauban	32nd Infantry Division (32e DI)		
39e GRDI	Normal	2nd Hussar Regiment (2e RH) CMC 18 - Tarbes	36th Infantry Division (36e DI)		
40e GRDI	Normal	CMC 4 - Alençon	7th Infantry Division (7e DI)		
41e GRDI	Normal	Cavalry Depot 14 - Lyon	44th Infantry Division (44e DI)		
42e GRDI	Normal	84e GRDI 98e GRDI CMC 15 - Orange	8th Infantry Division (8e DI)		
44e GRRF	Normal	30th Dragoon Regiment (30e RD) CMC 26 - Epernay	Fortified Region of Metz	Attached platoon of three White-Laffly AM 50s.	
45e GRRF	Normal	30th Dragoon Regiment (30e RD) CMC 26 - Epernay	Fortified Region of Metz		
46e GRRF	Normal	3rd Hussar Regiment (3e RH) CMC 20 - Nancy	Fortified Region of the Lauter		
47e GRDI	Normal	64e GRDI	59th Light Infantry Division (59e DLI)	Formed 31 May 1940.	
49e GRDI	Normal		240th Light Infantry Division (DLI)		
51e GRDI	Normal	CMC 21 - Rambouillet CMC 41 - Melun	70th Infantry Division (70e DI)		
52e GRDI	Normal	CMC 17 - Montauban	67th Infantry Division (67e DI)		
53e GRDI	Normal	CMC 16 - Carcassonne	66th Infantry Division (66e DI)		
54e GRDI	Normal	CMC 15 - Orange CMC 17 - Montauban	65th Infantry Division (65e DI)		
55e GRDI	Normal	CMC 14 - Lyon	64th Infantry Division (64e DI)		
56e GRDI	Normal	CMC 13 - Moulins	63rd Infantry Division (63e DI)		
57e GRDI	Normal	CMC 29 - Limoges	62nd Infantry Division (62e DI)		
59e GRDI	Normal	12th Chasseurs à Cheval Regiment (12e RCC) 83e GRDI CMC 17 - Montauban	68th Infantry Division (68e DI)	Formed 15 January 1940.	
60e GRDI	Normal	CMC 3 - Evreux CMC 41 - Melun	71st Infantry Division (71e DI)		
61e GRDI	Normal	CMC 8 - Beaune	58th Infantry Division (58e DI)		
62e GRDI	Normal	CMC 6 - Reims CMC 7 - Vesoul	57th Infantry Division (57e DI)		
63e GRDI	Normal	CMC 3 - Evreux CMC 26 - Epernay	56th Infantry Division (56e DI)		
64e GRDI	Normal	CMC 5 - Orléans	55th Infantry Division (55e DI)		
65e GRDI	Normal	CMC 4 - Alençon	54th Infantry Division (54e DI)		
66e GRDI	Normal	7th Chasseurs à Cheval Regiment (7e RCC) CMC 3 - Evreux	53rd Infantry Division (53e DI)		
68e GRDI	Normal	CMC 24 - Dinan	60th Infantry Division (60e DI)		
70e GRDI	Normal	CMC 1 - Saint-Omer	51st Infantry Division (51e DI)		
71e GRDI	Normal	2nd Hussar Regiment (2e RH) CMC 18 - Tarbes	1st Colonial Infantry Division (1re DIC)		
72e GRDI	Normal	10th Dragoon Regiment (10e RD) CMC 15 - Orange	2nd Colonial Infantry Division (2e DIC)		
73e GRDI	Normal	7th Chasseurs à Cheval Regiment (7e RCC) CMC 3 - Evreux CMC 61 - Saint-Germain-en Laye	3rd Colonial Infantry Division (3e DIC)		
74e GRDI	Normal	2nd Hussar Regiment (2e RH) CMC 17 - Montauban CMC 18 - Tarbes	4th Colonial Infantry Division (4e DIC)		
75e GRDI	Normal	CMC 16 - Carcassonne CMC 17 - Montauban	5th Colonial Infantry Division (5e DIC)		
76e GRDI	Normal	CMC 9 - Angers	6th Colonial Infantry Division (6e DIC)		
77e GRDI	Normal	CMC 17 - Montauban	7th Colonial Infantry Division (7e DIC)		
78e GRDI	Normal	CMC 21 - Rambouillet	8th Colonial Infantry Division (8e DIC)	Formed April 1940.	
80e GRDI	Normal	3rd Moroccan Spahi Regiment (3e RSM) CMC 18 - Tarbes	1st Moroccan Division (1re DM)		
82e GRDI	Normal	2nd Algerian Spahi Regiment (2e RSA) CMCA 2 - Tlemcen CMC 5 - Orléans	82nd African Infantry Division (82e DIA)		
84e GRDI	Normal	4th Tunisian Spahi Regiment (4e RST) CMCA 4 - Tunis	84th African Infantry Division (84e DIA)		
85e GRDI	Normal	1st Algerian Spahi Regiment (1er RSA) CMCA 1 - Médéa & Djelfa	85th African Infantry Division (85e DIA)		
86e GRDI	Outre-Mer	1st African Chasseurs Regiment (1er RCA) 8th Algerian Spahi Regiment (8e RSA) CMCA - Fez	86th African Infantry Division (86e DIA)		
87e GRDI	Normal	CMCA 3 - Batna & Tebessa CMC 16 - Carcassonne	87th African Infantry Division (87e DIA)		
88e GRDI	Outre-Mer	4th Tunisian Spahi Regiment (4e RST) 1st Foreign Legion Cavalry Regiment (1er REC) CMCA 8 - Sfax	88th African Infantry Division (88e DIA)		
91e GRDI	Normal	9th Cuirassier Regiment (9e RC) CMC 14 - Lyon	1st North African Infantry Division (1re DINA)		
92e GRDI	Normal	9th Dragoon Regiment (9e RD) CMC 26 - Epernay	2nd North African Infantry Division (2e DINA)		
93e GRDI	Normal	20th Dragoon Regiment (20e RD) CMC 29 - Limoges	3rd North African Infantry Division (3e DINA)		
94e GRDI	Normal	3rd Hussar Regiment (3e RH) CMC 20 - Nancy	4th North African Infantry Division (4e DINA)		
95e GRDI	Normal	CMC 14 - Lyon	5th North African Infantry Division (5e DINA)		
96e GRDI	Normal	Cavalry Depot - Angers & Niort	6th North African Infantry Division (6e DINA)		
97e GRDI	Normal	1st Foreign Legion Cavalry Regiment (1er REC) 2nd Foreign Legion Cavalry Regiment (2e REC) Cavalry Depot Sidi Bel Abbès	7th North African Infantry Division (7e DINA)	Originally 180e GRDI.	
121e GRDI	Reduced	1er GRDI Cavalry Depot - Evreux	17th Light Infantry Division (17e DLI)		
122e GRDI	Reduced	Cavalry Depot - Angers COMAM (Motorcycle and Armored Car Organization Center) - Montlhéry	241st Light Infantry Division (241e DLI)		
123e GRDI	Reduced	24e GRDI Cavalry Depot - Pontivy COMAM (Motorcycle and Armored Car Organization Center) - Montlhéry	236th Light Infantry Division (236e DLI)		
124e GRDI	Reduced	Cavalry Depot - Orléans COMAM (Motorcycle and Armored Car Organization Center) - Montlhéry	237th Light Infantry Division (237e DLI)		
125e GRDI	Reduced	Cavalry Depot - Evreux COMAM (Motorcycle and Armored Car Organization Center) - Montlhéry	241st Light Infantry Division (241e DLI)		
126e GRDI	Reduced	1er GRCA 10th Legion of the Mobile Guard COMAM (Motorcycle and Armored Car Organization Center) - Montlhéry Cavalry Depot - Baccarat	Groupement Duffour		
127e GRDI	Reduced	1er GRCA COMAM (Motorcycle and Armored Car Organization Center) - Montlhéry Cavalry Depot - Baccarat	327th Light Infantry Division (327e DLI)		
128e GRDI	Reduced	17th Mounted Dragoon Regiment (17e RDP) COMAM (Motorcycle and Armored Car Organization Center) - Montlhéry	3rd Light Cavalry Division (3e DLC)		
129e GRDI	Reduced	COMAM (Motorcycle and Armored Car Organization Center) - Montlhéry	239th Light Infantry Division (239e DLI)		
180e GRDI	Outre-Mer	1st Foreign Legion Cavalry Regiment (1er REC) Cavalry Depot Sousse	180th African Infantry Division (180e DIA)	Became 97e GRDI in February 1940.	
180e GRDI bis	Outre-Mer Reduced	2nd African Chasseurs Regiment (2e RCA) Cavalry Depot Tlemcen	180th African Infantry Division (180e DIA)		
181e GRDI	Outre-Mer Reduced	5th African Chasseurs Regiment (5e RCA) Cavalry Depot Tlemcen	181st African Infantry Division (181e DIA)		
182e GRDI	Outre-Mer Reduced	2nd African Chasseurs Regiment (2e RCA) Cavalry Depot Tlemcen	182nd African Infantry Division (182e DIA)		
183e GRDI	Outre-Mer Reduced	3rd African Chasseurs Regiment (3e RCA) Cavalry Depot Batna	183rd African Infantry Division (183e DIA)		
191e GRDI	Levant	8th Armored Car Group (8e GAM) 1st Moroccan Spahi Regiment (1er RSM) Cavalry Depot Aleppo	191st Infantry Division (191e DI)		
192e GRDI	Levant	8th Armored Car Group (8e GAM) 1st Moroccan Spahi Regiment (1er RSM) Cavalry Depot Aleppo	192nd Infantry Division (192e DI)		
