= 12th Army Corps Reconnaissance Group (France) =

French military unit during World War II

12e GRCA
- 12e Groupe de Reconnaissance de Corps d'Armée
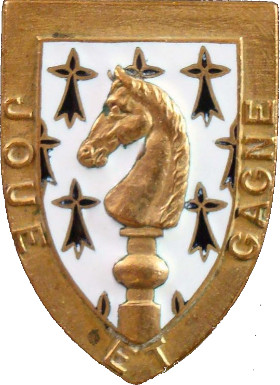
- Active: 1939 - 1940
- Country: France
- Type: Cavalry
- Size: Regiment
- Mottos: Joue et Gagne (Play and Win)
- Engagements: World War II: Battle of France; Battle of Sedan (1940)

Commanders
- Notable commanders: Lieutenant-Colonel René Cremière

The 12th Army Corps Reconnaissance Group (12e Groupe de Reconnaissance de Corps d’Armée, 12^{e} GRCA) was a cavalry reconnaissance group of the French army which participated in the Battle of France during the Second World War. The unit was involved in a number of engagements during the 1940 Campaign, including the battle of Stonne and the defense of the Loire bridges at Blois.

== Unit Symbols ==
The 12e GRCA’s emblem is a chess knight on a white shield backed by black ermine spots, the symbol of the region of Brittany where the unit was mobilized. The border of the shield features the unit’s motto “Joue et Gagne” (Play and Win).

== Command and Composition ==
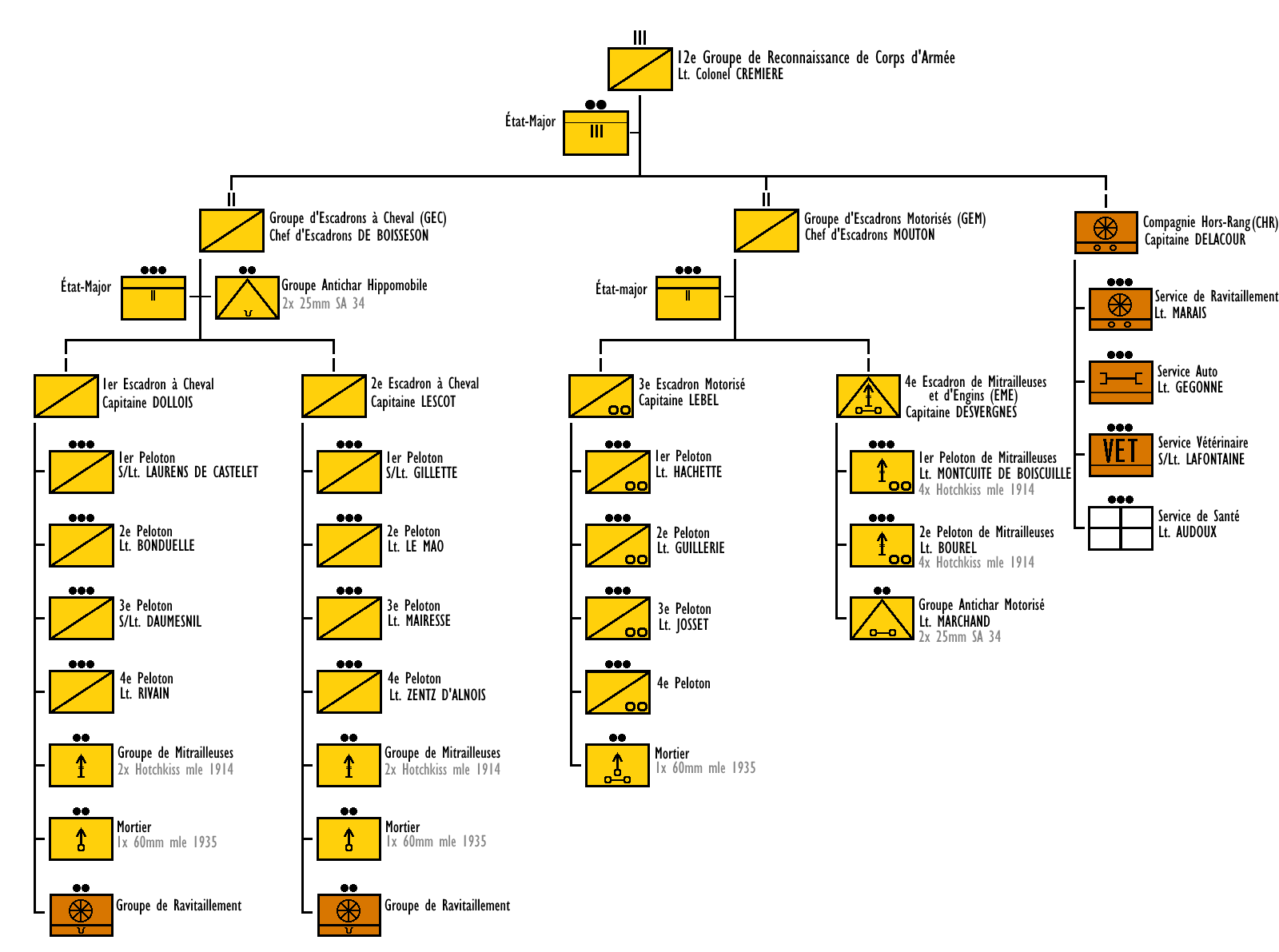
An organizational diagram of the 12e GRCA's composition in May 1940.

In 1940 the 12e GRCA was under the command of Lieutenant Colonel René Cremière and consisted of the following:

- Group of Horse-Mounted Squadrons (Groupe d’Escadrons à Cheval, GEC) - Chef d’Escadrons de Boisseson
  - 1st Mounted Squadron - Captain Dollois
    - 1st Platoon - Sub-Lieutenant Laurens de Castelet
    - 2nd Platoon - Lieutenant Bonduelle
    - 3rd Platoon - Sub-Lieutenant Daumesnil
    - 4th Platoon - Lieutenant Rivain
    - Horse-Drawn Machine Gun Group (2x Hotchkiss Mle 1914) and 60mm mortar (Brandt Mle 1935)
  - 2nd Mounted Squadron - Captain Lescot
    - 1st Platoon - Sub-Lieutenant Gillette
    - 2nd Platoon - Lieutenant Le Mao
    - 3rd Platoon - Lieutenant Mairesse
    - 4th Platoon - Lieutenant Zentz d'Alenois
    - Horse-Drawn Machine Gun Group (2x Hotchkiss Mle 1914) and 60mm mortar (Brandt Mle 1935)
  - Horse-Drawn Anti-Tank Group (2x 25 mm Hotchkiss anti-tank gun)
- Group of Motorized Squadrons (Groupe d’Escadrons Motorisés, GEM) - Chef d’Escadrons Mouton
  - 3rd Motorcycle Squadron - Captain Lebel
    - 1st Platoon - Lieutenant Hachette
    - 2nd Platoon - Lieutenant Guillerie
    - 3rd Platoon - Lieutenant Josset
    - 4th Platoon
    - Motorized machine gun group (2x Hotchkiss Mle 1914) and 60mm mortar (Brandt Mle 1935)
  - 4th Heavy Weapons Squadron (Escadron de Mitrailleuses et d'Engins, EME) - Captain Desvergnes
    - 1st Motorized Machine Gun Platoon (4x Hotchkiss Mle 1914) - Lieutenant Montcuite de Boiscuille
    - 2nd Motorized Machine Gun Platoon (4x Hotchkiss Mle 1914) - Lieutenant Bourel
    - Motorized Anti-Tank Group (2x 25 mm Hotchkiss anti-tank gun) - Lieutenant Marchand
- Service Company (Compagnie Hors-Rang, CHR) - Captain Delacour

Upon mobilization the unit counted 37 officers and 895 men. The 4th Squadron was equipped with VDP Lorraine 28 personnel carriers.

== History ==
The 12th Army Corps Reconnaissance Group was mobilized on 8 September 1939 at the cavalry mobilization center of Dinan. Most of the troops were from Brittany and Normandy, with the officers and NCOs largely drawn from the Garde Mobile of Saint-Brieuc and Saint-Malo. The 12e GRCA departed Dinan on 16 Sept 1939, to join the 10th Army Corps (10e CA), initially stationed near Brieulles-sur-Bar in the Ardennes, before relocating to the Sedan area in October 1939.

On 10 May 1940, the start of the German invasion of France and the Low Countries, the 12e GRCA was quickly deployed in Belgium, taking up positions north of Bouillon. On the 11th, two motorcycle platoons, operating on the flank of the 5th Light Cavalry Division (5e DLC), made contact with the enemy in the Paliseul-Bertrix area, while the motorized elements deployed in the Messincourt area north of Carignan. In the afternoon the unit was ordered back across the border, with the mounted elements taking up position at La Chapelle, north of Sedan. On 12 May they delayed the German advance until ordered to withdraw at 1600. The 12e GRCA then received orders to regroup in the La Cassine sector and take up positions near Les Grandes-Armoises and La Berlière. On 13 May at 2000 the GRCA was ordered to move to Stonne and establish an anti-tank position, to cover the movement of the 3rd Motorized Infantry Division (3e DIM) and 3rd Armored Division (3e DCr) to the front line.

The motorized elements took up position in the area of Viver and Le Mont-Dieu in liaison with the 6th Divisional Reconnaissance Group (6e GRDI) and 64e GRDI, while the mounted squadrons were deployed in Stonne with the 67th Infantry Regiment (67e RI) and, from 15 May onwards, the tanks of the 45th Tank Battalion (45e BCC). During three days of fighting the 12e GRCA twice repulsed attacks by German panzer units, suffering substantial losses before being relieved by the 3e DIM on 16 May. The mounted element was directed to the Grandes-Armoises area to regroup and the motorized elements to the forest of Sy. The mounted squadrons of the GEC had lost over 80 men and 6 officers, including Chef d’Escadrons de Boisseson.

The 12e GRCA came under heavy air attack, suffering substantial losses of men and vehicles. Subsequently the unit withdrew southwest of Brieulles-sur-Bar, before rejoining the 10e CA at Grivy, and finally being ordered to Belleville-sur-Bar, where it remained until 20 May 1940, placed in reserve at the disposition of the 3e DIM. On 21 Mai the 12e GRCA was attached to the 5e DLC, and was ordered to establish a defensive position northeast of Vouziers. Later the same day the unit was ordered to fall back to Verdun and join the 71st Infantry Division (71e DI), which was in the process of being reconstituted. The motorized elements established a defensive position at Haudiaumont, while the mounted elements moved to Varennes-en-Argonne. However, on 23 May the GRCA was placed at the disposal of the 2e Armée and ordered back to Belleville-sur-Bar to operate in support of the Corps d’Armée Coloniale (CAC) under General Freydenberg. Deployed southwest of Chatillon-sur-Bar, the GRCA was part of the third line of defense in the sector. In the evening on 25 May the 12e GRCA was again placed in army reserve and then attached to the 1re Brigade de Cavalerie at Thenorgues, where it remained until 30 May.

From 30 May to 9 June the unit protected the headquarters of the 2nd Army at Dun-sur-Meuse before being transported by rail to Versailles to participate in the defense of Paris. On 13 June the 12e GRCA deployed near Peray north of Rambouillet to protect the 10e CA HQ. Towards the end of the day, with Generals Pétain and Weygand; increasingly resigned to defeat, having elected to abandon Paris, the GRCA was ordered to withdraw to the region of Maintenon, then, on 14 May, to Chateaudun. On 17 June the unit was next ordered to regroup at Blois to defend the bridges over the Loire. Movement around the city was badly inhibited by the heavy flow of refugees southwards.

The motorized anti-tank group under Lt. Marchand was the first to arrive at 1400 on 17 June, followed an hour later by the machine gun squadron under Capt. Desvergenes and the motorcycle squadron under Capt. Lebel. Lt.-Col. Cremière directed these units to establish themselves on the left bank of the Loire in the suburb of Vienne to defend the crossings. These squadrons expected to be relieved by the 84th African Infantry Division (84e DIA), which was in the process of withdrawing across the river, and were ordered to hold long enough to cover the escape of the 4th Armored Division (4e DCr) and cavalry elements which were still operating on the far side. In the afternoon the unit came under air attack with Lt.-Col. Cremière among the wounded. During the night refugees, colonial troops of the 84e DIA, and elements of the 4e DCr crossed the bridges in the GRCA’s sector. The mounted elements of the 12e GRCA also managed to rejoin their unit, having completed a march of 80 km.

On 18 June, at 1030, three German armored cars were engaged while attempting to cross a railway bridge at the northern end of the GRCA’s sector; the engineers were successful in destroying the bridge before the Germans could cross. Subsequently the French positions came under heavy fire from 20mm flak guns, resulting in ten casualties and the loss of a machine gun. At 1300 a detachment from the 84e DIA finally arrived to relieve the GRCA. The 8th Tunisian Tirailleurs Regiment (8e RTT) took position at the western extremity of the French line while the 4th Zouaves Regiment (4e RZ) occupied the river in the vicinity of Saint-Dye. Elements of the 7th Mounted Dragoons Regiment (7e RDP) from the 3e DCr also arrived, allowing the GRCA to reinforce their position to the left of the main bridge and shift a platoon to serve as a reserve.

At 0330 on 19 June the Germans began to cross the river in rubber boats roughly 2 km upstream of the GRCA’s position, outside the range of the French defenders. The French cavalrymen came under intense fire from 105mm artillery. Capt. Lebel nevertheless managed to move a 60mm mortar within range and fire on the landing zone, but soon ran out of ammunition. German troops were soon reported in the forest near Bussy, threatening to outflank the French position and causing panic among the exhausted and demoralized tirailleurs of the 8e RTT who began to withdraw, obliging the 12e GRCA to shift and cover the vacated positions. At 1000 the motorcycle platoon under Lt. Hachette was ordered to attempt to dislodge the Germans from the forest with the support of tanks from the 4e DCr. Though initially successful, the French cavalry soon found themselves outnumbered and were forced to withdraw after suffering heavy losses. Around noon the French defenders were ordered to withdraw, which was accomplished under fire but in relatively good order, covered by the machine gun squadron of the GRCA.

Upon reaching Loches later in the day, the motorized squadrons were ordered to establish a defensive position at Corbery. In the afternoon on 20 June they were ordered to withdraw to Port-de-Piles. While on the road, they were redirected to La Guerche, in the Creuse department. On 21 June the motorized elements reached Bonneuil, where they were joined the following day by the mounted elements. On 23 June the GRCA continued to Verteuil then continued to Torsac, near Angouleme. On 24 June the unit was ordered to withdraw south of the Dordogne, passing through Riberac, Mussidan and Bergerac, where, on 25 June, the GRCA learned of the armistice over the radio. Continuing southwest of Miramont-de-Guyenne the unit would be progressively demobilized until mid-July, with the unit being formally dissolved on 12 August.
