= 84th African Infantry Division =

French WWII military unit

- Country: France
- Branch: (France) French Army
- Type: Division
- Engagements: World War II: Battle of France

Commanders
- Notable commanders: Charles-Pierre-Martial Ardant du Picq; Paul Amédée Marie Goubaux

The 84th African Infantry Division (84e Division d’Infanterie d’Afrique, 84e DIA) was an infantry division of the French army which fought in the Battle of France during World War II. Composed primarily of colonial tirailleurs from Tunisia, the division was largely annihilated in June 1940 while defending the Paris region during the German Case Red offensive. The division's regiments were later reconstituted and fought in Italy, France and Germany as part of the Army of Liberation from 1942 onwards.

== Role ==
The African Infantry Divisions were intended to serve in North Africa to free up first-line divisions for service in the French Metropole. The 84^{e} DIA was classified as an Overseas (Outre-Mer)-type division of the 2nd Category, accordingly, its composition differed from the “North East” type infantry division, with a lighter complement of artillery, consisting of two 75mm groups and one 155mm group. The division did not receive a 47mm anti-tank battery until it was transferred to France in June 1940.

== Command and Composition ==
At the time of the division's transfer to France in June 1940, the 84e DIA was under the command of Général de Division Charles-Pierre-Martial Ardant du Picq. It consisted of the following elements:

An organizational diagram depicting the composition of the 84th African Infantry Division in June 1940.

- 4th Tunisian Tirailleurs Regiment (4e Régiment de Tirailleurs Tunisiens, 4e RTT), under the command of Colonel Paul Rémy Pierre Bassères.
- 8th Tunisian Tirailleurs Regiment (8e Régiment de Tirailleurs Tunisiens, 8e RTT), under the command of Lieutenant-Colonel Jules François Jourdan.
  - Including Divisional Pioneer Company (Compagnie Divisionnaire de Pioniers, CDP) and Divisional Anti-Tank Company (Compagnie Divisionnaire Anti-Chars, CDAC), with 25mm Hotchkiss anti-tank guns.
- 4th Zouave Regiment (4e Régiment de Zouaves, 4e RZ), under the command of Col. Charles Pierre Abblard.
- 84th Divisional Reconnaisance Group (84e Groupe de Reconnaissance de Division d'Infanterie, 84e GRDI) under the command of Chef d'Escadrons Adler.
- 62nd African Artillery Regiment (62e Régiment d'Artillerie d'Afrique, 62e RAA)
  - Consisting of two horse-drawn groups equipped with 75mm guns, one truck-borne group equipped with 155mm howitzers, and one horse-drawn battery of 47mm anti-tank guns.
- Engineer Companies 84/1 and 84/2 (Compagnie de Sapeurs-Mineurs 74/1 & 74/2, CSM 74/1 & 74/2)
- 84th Divisional Artillery Park (Parc d'Artillerie Divisionnaire 84, 84e PAD)
- Including one Artillery Park Labor Company (Compagnie d'Ouvriers de Parc) and one Motorized Munitions Section (Section de Munitions Automobile)
- Telegraph Company 84/81 (Compagnie Télégraphique 84/81)
- Radiotelegraph Company 84/82 (Compagnie Radiotélégraphique 84/82)
- Horse-drawn Headquarters Transport Company 84/26 (Compagnie Hippomobile de QG 84/26)
- Motorized Headquarters Transport Company 184/26 (Compagnie Automobile de QG 184/26)
- Divisional Quartermaster Group 84/15 (Groupe d'Exploitation Divisionnaire 84/15)
- Divisional Medical Group 84 (Groupe Sanitaire Divisionnaire 84)

== History ==
=== Mobilization ===
The 84th African Infantry Division was mobilized at Tunis in September 1939, under the command of Gen. Charles-Pierre-Martial Ardant du Picq. The division was originally deployed along the Mareth Line near Toujane, to resist a possible invasion from Italian Libya. It was relieved by the 85th African Infantry Division in November 1939 and moved to a reserve position at Gafsa. The division's order of battle underwent several changes during this period: In February 1940 the 88e GRDI was replaced by the 84e GRDI. In March 1940, the 18th Senegalese Tirailleur Regiment (18e RTS) was replaced by the 4th Zouave Regiment, with the 18e RTS taking the latter's place as part of the 88e Division d’Infanterie d’Afrique.

=== Defense of the Seine and Oise ===
On 25 May, following the German breakthrough in France, the division was ordered to France as reinforcement, traveling by sea from Bizerte to Marseille, where it arrived on 30 May. The 84e DIA was transferred north to Paris, where it was placed under the command of General Pierre Héring's Army of Paris tasked with preparing the defense of the city. The 84th Division was under the operational control of General Pierre-Paul-Charles Grandsard's 10th Army Corps. On 8 June the division went into the line along the Oise and Seine: The 4e RTT defended the river crossings in the vicinity of l’Isle Adam, with the 8e RTT deployed to their south around Méry-sur-Oise. The 4e RZ was deployed further west in the region of Mantes-la-Jolie, and from there sent onwards to Vernon. The 84e GRDI was also deployed west of Paris. On 8 June Gen. Ardant du Picq was killed during a German aerial bombing of Pontoise, he was replaced by Gen. Paul Amédée Marie Goubaux.

On 9 June all three regiments came under heavy attack as the Germans sought to breach the French defensive line as part of Case Red, an offensive aimed at capturing Paris. Early on 10 June the Germans succeeded in crossing the Seine near Vernon and the 4e Zouaves were forced back with considerable losses. The 1st Battalion of the 4e RTT was dispatched to the area as reinforcements, arriving on the night of 10 June. German attempts to cross the Oise were less successful; the bridges at Pontoise were successfully destroyed on the night of 10–11 June, and the 4e RTT repulsed multiple German crossing attempts near l’Isle Adam from 10–12 June. On 11 and 12 June the 4e RZ and I/4e RTT blocked the advance of the Germans from Vernon towards Paris, defending the Bois de Chêne northwest of Mantes-la-Jolie.

However, the collapse of the left wing of the French line on the Somme obliged the division to begin a withdrawal towards the south to avoid encirclement. In the early hours of 13 June the Zouaves and I/4e RTT began to withdraw to the Eure. The 4e and 8e RTT were ordered to abandon their positions on the Oise withdraw southwest through the western suburbs of Paris, regrouping south of the Seine.

=== In Combat 16–18 June ===
In the course of this fighting retreat, the regiments became increasingly separated, and command and control began to break down. While the three regiments of the division should have regrouped between Chartres and Rambouillet, the headquarters of the 8e RTT became confused by an order outlining the successive points of resistance to be occupied by the regiment, and on 15 June the 8e Tirailleurs began a premature withdrawal southwards, followed by the 4e Zouaves. Around 02:00 on 16 June the 4e RZ received new orders to hold their ground- attempting to return to their previous positions at Yermenonville and Armenonville, the 1st and 2nd Battalions turned back, but discovered that the villages had already been occupied by the German 8th Infantry Division. The bulk of the two battalions would be surrounded and destroyed during the day, with only scattered elements escaping south to rejoin the 3rd Battalion.

The 4e RTT, meanwhile, remained in place, isolated, with its headquarters at Monvilliers and battalions widely-scattered: the 1st Battalion at Houville-la-Branche, 2nd Battalion near Ouarville, and the 3rd Battalion near Ablis. Each battalion of the 4e RTT established its own defensive perimeter, which were held until encirclement and destruction on 16 June. I/4e RTT at Houville-la-Branche was engaged by the German 8th Infantry Division at noon on 16 June, and resisted for seven hours. Completely encircled, only two tirailleurs managed to escape southwards. II/4e RTT had its companies thinly-spread in the area between Ablis and Long-Orme, and was engaged by two German regiments (7th and 83rd Infantry Regiments) beginning at 0700. The 2nd Battalion was largely annihilated by noon. III/4e RTT, also with its companies dispersed to hold the villages of Essarts, Gourville and La Chapelle, was attacked at 07:00 and routed or destroyed by late morning. The regimental headquarters at Monvilliers, along with an anti-tank gun section, came under attack at 13:00 by a German force of armored cars and motorcycles. A number of the German vehicles were disabled or destroyed before the French forces retreated southwards, reaching Allaines.

For its part, the 8e RTT was also dispersed on the morning of 16 June, with I/8e RTT at Viabon, II/8e RTT between Allones and Voves, and III/8e RTT at Boisville-la-Saint-Père. At 08:00 the regiment was ordered to return northwards and take up positions at Houville-la-Branche to reestablish links with the 4e RTT. However it was already too late, and while the regiment was on the march it came under attack from the advancing German 28th Infantry Division. The 2nd and 3rd Battalions in particular took heavy losses, and the regiment hastily organized new defensive positions.

The 2nd Battalion of the 8e RTT took a number of casualties at Cinq-Ormes during the advance north; at 13:30 Commandant Mamier, the battalion commander, ordered the 5th Company to dig in at Francourville and the 6th Company, plus a machine gun platoon, to establish a defensive position at Sours. The 7th Company occupied Prunay-le-Gillon. 5/II/8e RTT in Francourville came under attack from the German 28th and 83rd Infantry Regiments at 1600. The tirailleurs resisted until 21:00 when I.R. 83 finally overran the village. Much of the company escaped to the south, but was later captured during the night in Nicorbon. The 6th Company arrived at Sours at 17h30 and found it was already occupied by German infantry from I.R. 38; a sharp engagement ensued and by 19:00 the Tunisians had exhausted their ammunition. Most of the company was killed or captured in hand-to-hand fighting. 7/II/8e RTT came under attack by armored vehicles of the 18th Army during the afternoon and retreated towards Voves.

III/8e RTT was covering the 2nd Battalion's eastern flank, occupying positions stretching from Honville to Boisville-la-Saint-Père. During the afternoon German tanks attacked from the east, three were disabled by French anti-tank guns in Honville, causing the others to retreat. Soon after the Tunisian troops came under heavy artillery bombardment followed by an assault. Around 18:00 the tirailleurs ran short of ammunition and their positions were overrun by the German 8th Infantry Regiment. Most of 9/III/8e RTT managed to escape to the south, where I/8e RTT and the 84e GRDI were holding the line around Voves, and attempting to maintain liaison with the few remaining tanks of the 4th Armored Division. The remainder of the regiment and the reconnaissance group held this position until the morning of 17 June, and then fell back to Conie-Molitard, where they fought another delaying action to permit the withdrawal of the rest of the division.

The surviving elements of the division continued to retreat towards the south, on 17 June the remnants of the 4e Tirailleurs crossed the Loire at Beaugency, followed on 18 June by the 4e Zouaves and 8e Tirailleurs who crossed the Loire at Blois, where the bridges were defended by cavalrymen of the 12th Army Corps Reconnaissance Group. At this point, there remained roughly two companies from the 4^{e} Zouaves, one company of 150 men cobbled together from the remnants of the 4e RTT, and about 550 men of the 8e RTT.

=== End of the Campaign ===
On 19 June the 84e DIA occupied defensive positions to the south and west of Blois along the Loire, but in the afternoon received information that German troops had already occupied Selles-sur-Cher, roughly 40 km to the south. At the same time, German troops made crossing attempts at multiple points along the division's front. At 16:00 orders were issued to withdraw south of the Cher. The division reached the river on the night of 19–20 June, establishing defensive positions at Montrichard, Saint-Georges and Chenonceaux. At 02:00 on 20 June the bridges were blown up; the 4e RTT, which was serving as the rearguard, had not yet crossed and roughly half its men were stranded on the north side of the Cher. In the afternoon the 4e RZ’s position at Montrichard came under attack.

At 14:30 on 20 June the division received new orders to fall back and establish defensive positions on the Indre river between Azay-sur-Indre and Perruson. During the night of 20–21 June new instructions were issued to withdraw to the Esves river and establish a defensive line between Ligueil and Esves-le-Moutier. This was accomplished by dawn on 21 June. In the afternoon heavy fighting occurred around Ligueil. The 84e DIA withdrew to the Brignon, between Neuilly-le-Brignon and Ferrière-Larçon. During the night of 21–22 June the division was withdrawn across the Creuse, occupying a sector between Lesigny and La Roche-Posay. Around 18:00 the 4e Zouaves engaged and destroyed a German reconnaissance element including armored cars near La Roche Posay. On the night of 22–23 June the division fell back across the Charente, holding the river between Savigny and Charroux. On the night of 24 June the 84th African Infantry Division was withdrawn behind the Dordogne where it remained when the armistice went into effect.

From August 1940 onwards the surviving units of the division were transported back to Tunisia where they were formally dissolved. The 4th Tunisian Tirailleur Regiment was reformed in November 1940, while the remaining personnel of the 4th Zouave Regiment and 8th Tunisian Tiralleur Regiment were combined to form the 4th Mixed Regiment of Zouaves and Tirailleurs (4e Régiment Mixte de Zouaves et Tirailleurs, 4e RMZT). Both regiments as well as the 62nd African Artillery Regiment would go on to fight in Tunisia, Italy, France and Germany as part of the Army of Liberation.
