= 7th Divisional Reconnaissance Group =

7e GRDI
- Active: 1939 - 1940
- Country: France
- Type: Cavalry
- Size: Battalion
- Mottos: En avant, tout est nôtre (Forward, all is ours)
- Engagements: World War II: Battle of France; Battle of Hannut; Battle of Dunkirk
- Decorations: Croix de Guerre 1939-1945

Commanders
- Notable commanders: Lieutenant-Colonel Marie Charles Jean Mariot

The 7th Divisional Reconnaissance Group (7e Groupe de Reconnaissance de Division d’Infanterie, 7e GRDI) was a reconnaissance group of the French army which participated in the Battle of France during the Second World War. The unit participated in a number of major actions, including the Battle of Hannut and the Battle of Dunkirk, where the 7e GRDI protected the evacuation beaches, ultimately remaining behind to permit the escape of allied forces.

== Unit Symbols ==
The unit’s insignia was a gold shield charged with a black lion rampant, crowned by a blue band with seven gold fleur-de-lis, with a silver sword running top to bottom. The insignia is meant to evoke the heraldry of Flanders and Artois, the historical regions of Saint-Omer, the unit’s garrison city. The sword symbolizes Joan of Arc.

The unit’s motto was: En avant, tout est nôtre (Forward, all is ours).

== Command and Composition ==
An organizational diagram depicting the 7e GRDI's order of battle at the start of the 1940 campaign.

In 1940 the 7e GRDI was under the command of Lieutenant-Colonel Marie Charles Jean Mariot and consisted of the following:

- 1st Group of Squadrons - Commandant Ruault
  - 1st Armored Car Squadron - Captain Joseph Marie Michel Eugène de Franc de Pompignan
    - 1st AMD Platoon - Maréchal des Logis Sauzeau
    - 2nd AMD Platoon - Sub-Lieutenant Daniel Lemaire
    - 3rd AMR Platoon - Sub-Lieutenant Robert Rousseau
    - 4th AMR Platoon - Lieutenant Rodolphe Versavel
  - 2nd Motorcycle Squadron - Captain Paul du Breuil de Pontbriand
    - 1st Platoon - Lieutenant Edouard Defarcy
    - 2nd Platoon - Lieutenant Paul Lallemant
    - 3rd Platoon - Sub-Lieutenant Paul Louis Ghislain Marie Joseph Motte
    - 4th Platoon - Lieutenant Pierre Gérard
- 2nd Group of Squadrons - Commandant Paul Ernest René Lair
  - 3rd Armored Car Squadron - Captain Désiré Henri Cochard
    - 1st AMD Platoon - Lieutenant Charles Delambre
    - 2nd AMD Platoon - Sub-Lieutenant Jacques Morat
    - 3rd AMR Platoon - Sub-Lieutenant Henri Desoutter
    - 4th AMR Platoon - Sub-Lieutenant Klotz
  - 4th Motorcycle Squadron - Captain Etienne Calté
    - 1st Platoon - Lieutenant Jean Durieux
    - 2nd Platoon - Sub-Lieutenant Michel Dunoyer de Ségonzac
    - 3rd Platoon - Lieutenant Pierre Henri Alexis Joseph Berton
    - 4th Platoon - Maréchal des Logis Pierre Mordacq
  - 5th Heavy Weapons Squadron - Captain de Fremont
    - 1st Machine Gun Platoon - Sub-Lieutenant Claude Cardon
    - 2nd Machine Gun Platoon - Maréchal des Logis Duhamel
    - Group of 25 mm anti-tank guns - Sub-Lieutenant Octave Bajeux
    - Group of AMR 35 ZT3 tankettes - Lieutenant Claude Clerc
- Service Company - Capitaine Pierre Avoine

On 9 May 1940 the unit totalled 830 men including 35 officers. The AMD (Automitrailleuse de Découverte) platoons were equipped with Panhard 178 armored cars while the AMR (Automitrailleuse de Reconnaissance) platoons were equipped with Schneider P 16 armored cars.

== History ==
The 7th Divisional Reconnaissance Group was created in 1939 with components raised from the 7th Armored Car Group (7e Groupe d’Automitrailleuses) and Cavalry Mobilization Center 1 (Centre Mobilisateur de la Cavalerie, CMC 1) at Saint-Omer. It was attached to the 1st Motorized Infantry Division (1re Division d’Infanterie Motorisée, 1re DIM).

At the time of the German invasion on 10 May 1940 it was detached from the 1re DIM and formed part of Groupement Soubeyran, an ad-hoc motorized cavalry formation that combined a number of reconnaissance elements, led by Lieutenant-Colonel de Soubeyran, commander of the 6th Army Corps Reconnaissance Group (6e Groupe de Reconnaissance de Corps d’Armée, 6e GRCA). As part of the Dyle Maneuver, the unit crossed the Franco-Belgian border at Quiévrechain on 11 May and reached the Dyle.

On 13 May, during the Battle of Hannut, the 7e GRDI held the left flank of the 3rd Light Mechanized Division (3e Division Légère Mécanique, 3e DLM) near Tirlemont, and an outpost at Gossoncourt made contact with the enemy, buying time for the 11th Mounted Dragoon Regiment (11e Régiment de Dragons Portés, 11e RDP) to pull back. On 14 May, in cooperation with the tank brigade of the 3e DLM, the unit held positions in advance of the main body of the division.

As the 1st Army fell back towards the Sambre the 7e GRDI held bridges to permit the withdrawal of the infantry, overseeing the destruction of bridges at Chatelet and Pont-du-Loup on 16 May. The next day the group was placed at the disposal of the 5th North African Infantry Division (5e Division d’Infanterie Nord-Africaine, 5e DINA) and ordered to hold Ransaart and Gosselies to cover the division’s withdrawal to the French border. On 18 May the unit was returned to the 1re DIM and carried out a number of bridge destructions to cover the withdrawal of the French army and British Expeditionary Force behind the Scheldt.

On 22 May the group was placed under the command of General Bougrain of the 2e DLM. On the 22nd and 23rd the 7e GRDI was involved in combat east of Blaches, and carried out reconnaissance of Arras and Aubigny. The unit organized and held defensive positions along the Scarpe until relieved by the 5e DINA.

On 23 and 24 May it supported British troops holding the Canal d'Aire at Béthune, La Bassée, Ebblinghem, Saint-Venant and Gorre. Holding the bridge at Gorre the 4th motorcycle platoon, 2nd Squadron under Lt. Gerard was heavily engaged for most of the day. At 1500 Sub-Lieutenant Morat of the 3rd Squadron advanced his Panhard armored car onto the bridge to engage and destroy a German anti-tank gun, but subsequently suffered a hit to the turret which killed him and left the crew of the vehicle badly burned.

On 25 May the unit was attached to the 43rd Infantry Division (43e Division d’Infanterie, 43e DI). On 26 and 27 May the 7e GRDI supported British units in counterattacks on la Bassée and Violaines. Falling back towards Dunkirk, from 28 May the 7e GRDI held positions on the Canal de Moeres to cover the evacuation of allied troops, cooperating with the 18e GRCA in the defense of Boomkens.

Unable to be evacuated, a number of men of the unit were captured when Dunkirk fell on 3 June.

Over the course of the campaign the 7e GRDI suffered 17 officers killed or wounded, and 230 men killed, wounded or captured.

== Honors and Memorials ==
The 7e GRDI was cited for its actions during the campaign by Order of the Army n°1919bis and decorated with the Croix de Guerre 1939-1945 with palm.

There is a monument to the 7e GRDI at Coudekerque-Branche which reads: "On 2 and 3 June 1940 roughly 180 cavalrymen of the 7th Divisional Reconnaissance Group defended the town of Coudekerque-Branche, despite the peril to their lives they prevented penetration by German forces contributing significantly to the success of Operation Dynamo."
