= 10th Army Corps (France) =

French military unit

10e Corps de Armée
- Country: France
- Branch: Army
- Type: Army Corps
- Engagements: Franco-Prussian War; World War I World War II

Commanders
- Notable commanders: François Anthoine

The French 10th Army Corps was a French military unit during the Napoleonic War, First World War and Second World War. Military Operations, France and Belgium, 1918, Volume II (Great War, 38)

At the beginning of the First World War it was attached to the Fifth Army.

Its composition at that time was changed several times during the war.

During the Second World War, it included:

- the 3rd North African Infantry Division
- the 5th Light Cavalry Division (France)
- the 55th Infantry Division (France)
- and the 71st Infantry Division (France).

It saw action during the Battle of Belgium and the Battle of France.
