= 1st Infantry Division (France) =

Military unit

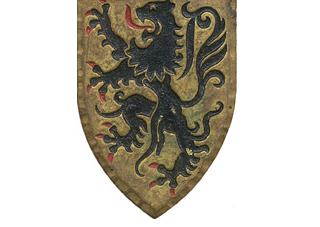
- Active: 1800–1871; 28 September 1873 – 10 June 1940; November 1944 – April 1946
- Country: France
- Branch: French Army
- Type: Infantry (1800 - 1935); Mechanized Infantry (1935 - 1946)
- Size: Division
- Engagements: Napoleonic Wars: Russian campaign; Battle of Waterloo; Second Italian War of Independence; Franco-Prussian War: Battle of Wissembourg; World War I: Battle of Charleroi; First Battle of Guise; First Battle of the Marne (Battle of the Two Morins); First Battle of the Aisne; First Battle of Champagne; First Battle of Woevre; Battle of Verdun; Battle of the Somme; Second Battle of the Aisne; Second Battle of Flanders; Second Battle of Picardy; Second Battle of the Marne; World War II: Battle of France; Siege of Lille; Liberation of France

The French 1st Infantry Division (French: 1^{re} Division d'Infanterie, 1^{re} DI) was a division of the French army which fought in a number of major battles in the First World War. Reorganized as the 1st Motorized Infantry Division (1^{re} Division d'Infanterie Motorisée, 1^{re} DIM) during the interwar period, it fought in the Second World War and was largely destroyed during the Battle of France before being reconstituted in 1944.

== 1800-1873 ==
It fought in almost all French campaigns of the 19th and 20th century.

The First Division was led in 1805 by Pierre Dupont de l'Étang and participated in the Napoleonic Wars, including the Russian campaign and the Battle of Waterloo.

Between 1859 and 1862 it was under command of Élie Frédéric Forey and fought in the Second Italian War of Independence. At the start of the Franco-Prussian War, the Division was led by Auguste-Alexandre Ducrot and suffered a defeat at the Battle of Wissembourg (1870).

== 1873-1914 ==
The division was established by the Decree of 28 September 1873 which reorganized the French Army. The division was assigned to the 1st Military Region (1^{re} Région Militaire) and garrisoned in Lille. It consisted of two brigades, each with two infantry regiments:

- 1st Infantry Brigade (1^{re} Brigade d'Infanterie)
  - 43rd Line Infantry Regiment (43^{e} Régiment d'Infanterie de Ligne)
  - 127th Line Infantry Regiment (127^{e} Régiment d'Infanterie de Ligne)
- 2nd Infantry Brigade (2^{e} Brigade d'Infanterie)
  - 1st Line Infantry Regiment (1^{er} Régiment d'Infanterie de Ligne)
  - 84th Line Infantry Regiment (84^{e} Régiment d'Infanterie de Ligne)

== First World War ==
=== Command and Composition in 1914 ===
At the beginning of the First World War, the division was mobilized in the 1st Military Region and formed part of the 1st Army Corps (1^{er} Corps d'Armée). The 1st Division was under the command of General Marie Alexandre Émile Hippolyte Gallet, and consisted of:

- 1st Infantry Brigade (1^{re} Brigade d'Infanterie)
  - 43rd Infantry Regiment (43^{e} Régiment d'Infanterie, 43^{e} RI)
  - 127th Infantry Regiment (127^{e} Régiment d'Infanterie, 127^{e} RI)
- 2nd Infantry Brigade (2^{e} Brigade d'Infanterie)
  - 1st Infantry Regiment (1^{er} Régiment d'Infanterie, 1^{er} RI)
  - 84th Infantry Regiment, (84^{e} Régiment d'Infanterie, 84^{e} RI)
- 15th Field Artillery Regiment (15^{e} Régiment d'Artillerie de Campagne, 15^{e} RAC)
  - Composed of three groups of 75 mm field guns.
- 5th Squadron, 6th Mounted Chasseurs Regiment (6^{e} Régiment de Chasseurs à Cheval, 6^{e} RCC)
- Engineer Company 1/1 from the 3rd Engineer Regiment (3^{e} Régiment du Génie, 3^{e} RG)

=== Combat History ===
Initially deployed in a covering position along the Meuse between Charleville-Mézières and Monthermé, the 1^{re} Division d'Infanterie moved northwards in response to the German invasion of Belgium, engaging in the Battle of Charleroi from 23 August onwards. On 25 August, it fought at Mariembourg, and from the 29th was involved in the Battle of Guise, conducting a fighting retreat southwards until 6 September. From that date, the Division was involved in the First Battle of the Marne, fighting in the Battle of Deux Morins in the vicinity of Esternay, Maclaunay and Margny. From 10 September, the 1st Division pursued the retreating German army northwards, advancing as far as the region of Reims.

From 13 September until 1 November 1914, the unit was engaged in the First Battle of the Aisne, fighting in the vicinity of Berry-au-Bac and participating in the French attacks on Sapigneul. On 3 October 1914, General Joseph Bro took over command of the division, replacing Gen. Gallet. On 6 November, the division counterattacked and retook the village of Soupir. From 7 to 14 November, the 1re Division was involved in fighting around Soupir and Chavonne. Withdrawn from the front in December, the unit was stationed near Suippes.

From 28 December 1914 until 3 March 1915, the 1^{re} Division was involved in the First Battle of Champagne, and participated in violent combat around Beauséjour in February. On 8 March 1915, Général Jacques Élie de Riols de Fonclare took command of the division replacing Gen. Bro. On 12 March, the division was pulled off the front line for rest near Champigneul-Champagne before being moved by rail to the region of Verdun. From 5 to 20 April, the division was engaged in the First Battle of Woëvre, fighting in the area to the east of Braquis and Hennemont. On 20 April, it was pulled off the frontline and moved overland to Sainte-Menehould and then by rail to Fismes. On 26 April, the unit returned to the front near Berry-au-Bac. In June 1915, the 84^{e} Régiment d'Infanterie was replaced by the 201^{e} Régiment d'Infanterie (201^{e} RI), and Engineer Company 15/1 of the 3^{e} RG was attached to the division, joined in July 1915 by the 102nd Battery of 58 mm mortars from the 27^{e} RAC, which remained with the 1st Division until January 1918. On 17 July, the division was pulled off the front once more to rest and carry out fortification works near Branscourt. On 18 August, the division occupied a sector of the front near Loivre and la Neuville, which would eventually be extended as far as Berry-au-Bac. It remained in place until February 1916.

On 20 February 1916, the 1st Division was pulled off the front line and transported to Verdun, where it fought in the Battle of Verdun from 29 February until 7 April. The division was then withdrawn to rest and regroup near Saint-Dizier. Transported by rail back to the region of Fismes the division occupied a sector between Moulin Pontoy and Troyon from 21 April until 20 July. Pulled off the front for rest near Épernay, the 1^{re} Division moved south for training near Crèvecœur-le-Grand and then was transported to the region of Amiens on 9 August.

Returning to the front, the 1st Division fought in the Battle of the Somme from 19 August 1916 to 30 September. On 24 September, troops of the division took Maurepas and on 26 September participated in the taking of Combles. Pulled off the front on 30 September, the unit was transported to the Camp de Châlons for rest. From 7 October until 27 November, it occupied a sector of the front near Sainte-Marie-à-Py. On 6 October 1916, General Léon Grégoire took over command of the division, and the 43^{e} RI was detached and joined the 162nd Infantry Division (162^{e} Division d'Infanterie, 162^{e} DI), while the 127^{e} RI was detached to join the 129^{e} DI. In November, the brigades were abolished, and the 223^{e} RI was attached, bringing the 1st Division to a strength of three infantry regiments: 1^{er}, 201^{e}, and 223^{e}. In late 1916, Engineer Company 21/1 of the 3^{e} RG was attached.

Withdrawn for rest and training from 27 November to 4 January 1917, the 1st Division reoccupied the same sector until the end of January, when it was once more pulled off the front for rest and training near Châlons-sur-Marne and Suippes. On 3 March, the division moved back to the area of Fismes. On 9 April, the 1^{re} DI occupied a sector near Craonne, which it captured during the Battle of the Chemin de Dames between 15 and 21 April. The unit was then pulled off the line to recover. In May 1917, the 1st Squadron of the 6e RCC replaced the 5th Squadron. On 25 June 1917, the division traveled by rail to Dunkirk. On 27 June, it was placed in reserve southwest of Het-Sas. On 7 July, it relieved a division of the Belgian Army and occupied a sector near Boesinghe. Between 31 July until 7 December, the 1^{re} Division was involved in the Second Battle of Flanders. On the first day of the battle, the unit attacked and captured the town of Bikschote. Pulled off the front from 5–20 August to rest near Bergues, it then occupied a sector between Bikschote et Langemark. From 14 September to 16 October, the division recovered and trained near Calais. The 1^{re} DI then went back into the line between Langemarck et Merkem and participated in a French offensive, advancing in the direction of Saint-Jansbeek and Kloosterschool. The division then went back into reserve from 7 December until 18 January 1918. From the end of 1917 until April 1918, the 101st Battery of 58 mm mortars from the 15e RAC was attached.

From 21 January 1918, the 1st Division occupied a section of the front covering the forest of Vauclerc and le Ployon. From 9 to 23 March, the division was pulled off the line and rested at Arcis-le-Ponsart. Returning to the front the 1^{re} Division fought in the Second Battle of Picardy beginning on 25 March, first engaged south of Guiscard and executing a fighting retreat towards Noyon where it dug in along the Oise. The division was involved in combat on Mont Renaud. As the front stabilized the 1^{re} DI held a sector extending from Ourscamp to Pontoise-lès-Noyon. From 12 to 28 May, the division was rested near Choisy-au-Bac.

From 28 May 1918, the division was engaged in the Third Battle of the Aisne, fighting in the vicinity of Villers-Cotterêts. After resting from 5 to 11 June, the division reoccupied a sector between the forest of Villers-Cotterêts to Corcy. From 11 to 13 June, the 1^{re} DI was involved in intense combat near the Chavigny Farm and conducted reconnaissance towards Longpont. Pulled out of combat on 13 July, the division would be reengaged on the 18th in the context of the Second Battle of the Marne, fighting in the Battle of the Soissonnais in the vicinity of Blanzy, and participating in an offensive towards Grand-Rozoy and Le Plessier-Huleu. From July 1918 the 7th Group of the 101st Heavy Artillery Regiment (101^{e} Régiment d'Artillerie Lourde, 101^{e} RAL), with Schneider 155 mm guns, was attached to the division.

From 28 July 1918, the division was withdrawn and rested to the west of Compiègne. In August, the 1st Battalion of Pioneers from the 110th Territorial Infantry Regiment (110^{e} Régiment d'Infanterie Territoriale, 110^{e} RIT) was attached. On 27 August, the division began to move towards Alsace and from 31 August occupied a sector of the front between Leimbach and Metzeral. On 19 October, the 1^{re} Division d'Infanterie was withdrawn from the front and transported to the Camp de Darney for rest and training. At the time of the armistice on 11 November 1918, the division had moved to Mirecourt and was making preparations to go on the offensive.

=== Command and Composition in 1918 ===
At the time of the armistice, the 1^{re} Division d'Infanterie was under the command of General Léon Grégoire and consisted of the following units:

- 1st Infantry Regiment (1^{e}^{r}Régiment d'Infanterie, 1^{er} RI)
- 201st Infantry Regiment (201^{e} Régiment d'Infanterie, 201^{e} RI)
- 223rd Infantry Regiment (223^{e} Régiment d'Infanterie, 223^{e} RI)
- 15th Field Artillery Regiment (15^{e} Régiment d'Artillerie de Campagne, 15^{e} RAC)
  - Three groups of 75 mm field guns.
- 7th Group, 101st Heavy Artillery Regiment (101^{e} Régiment d'Artillerie Lourde, 101^{e} RAL)
  - One group of 155 mm howitzers.
- 1st Squadron, 6th Mounted Chasseurs Regiment (6^{e} Régiment de Chasseurs à Cheval, 6^{e} RCC)
- Engineer Companies 1/1, 15/1, and 21/1 from the 3rd Engineer Regiment (3^{e} Régiment du Génie, 3^{e} RG)
- 1st Battalion of Pioneers from the 110th Territorial Infantry Regiment (110^{e} Régiment d'Infanterie Territoriale, 110^{e} RIT)

== 1935-1940: 1st Motorised Infantry Division ==
After World War I, the 1^{re} Division d'Infanterie was again stationed in Lille. In 1935 it was reorganized and became the 1st Motorised Infantry Division (1^{re} Division d'Infanterie Motorisée, 1^{re} DIM). Upon mobilization in 1939 the division was assigned to the 3rd Army Corps (3^{e} Corps d'Armée) of the 1st Army (1^{re} Armée), and was designated to advance into Belgium as part of the Dyle Plan.

=== Command and Composition ===
In May 1940, the division was led by Général Paul-René Malivoire-Filhol de Camas and consisted of the following elements:

- 1st Motorized Infantry Regiment (1^{er} Régiment d'Infanterie Motorisée, 1^{er} RIM)
  - Including Divisional Pioneer Company (Compagnie Divisionnaire de Pioniers, CDP).
- 43rd Motorized Infantry Regiment (43^{e} Régiment d'Infanterie Motorisée, 43^{e} RIM)
  - Including Divisional Anti-Tank Company (Compagnie Divisionnaire Anti-Chars, CDAC), with 25 mm SA 34 anti-tank guns.
- 110th Motorized Infantry Regiment (110^{e} Régiment d'Infanterie Motorisée, 110^{e} RIM)
- 7th Divisional Reconnaissance Group (7^{e} Groupe de Reconnaissance de Division d'Infanterie, 7^{e} GRDI)
  - Composed of two armored car squadrons equipped with Panhard 178 and Schneider P16 armored cars, two motorcycle squadrons, and a motorized heavy weapons squadron with 25mm anti-tank guns and AMR 35 ZT2/3 tankettes.
- 15th Divisional Artillery Regiment (15^{e} Régiment d'Artillerie Divisionnaire, 15^{e} RAD)
  - Three 75 mm groups plus Divisional Anti-Tank Battery (Batterie Divisionnaire Anti-Chars, BDAC) with 47 mm SA 37 anti-tank guns and an attached battery from the 409th Air Defense Artillery Regiment (409^{e} Régiment d'Artillerie de Défense Contre Aéronefs, 409^{e} RADCA) with 25 mm CA mle 38 anti-aircraft guns.
- 215th Heavy Divisional Artillery Regiment (215^{e} Régiment d'Artillerie Lourde Divisionnaire, 215^{e} RALD)
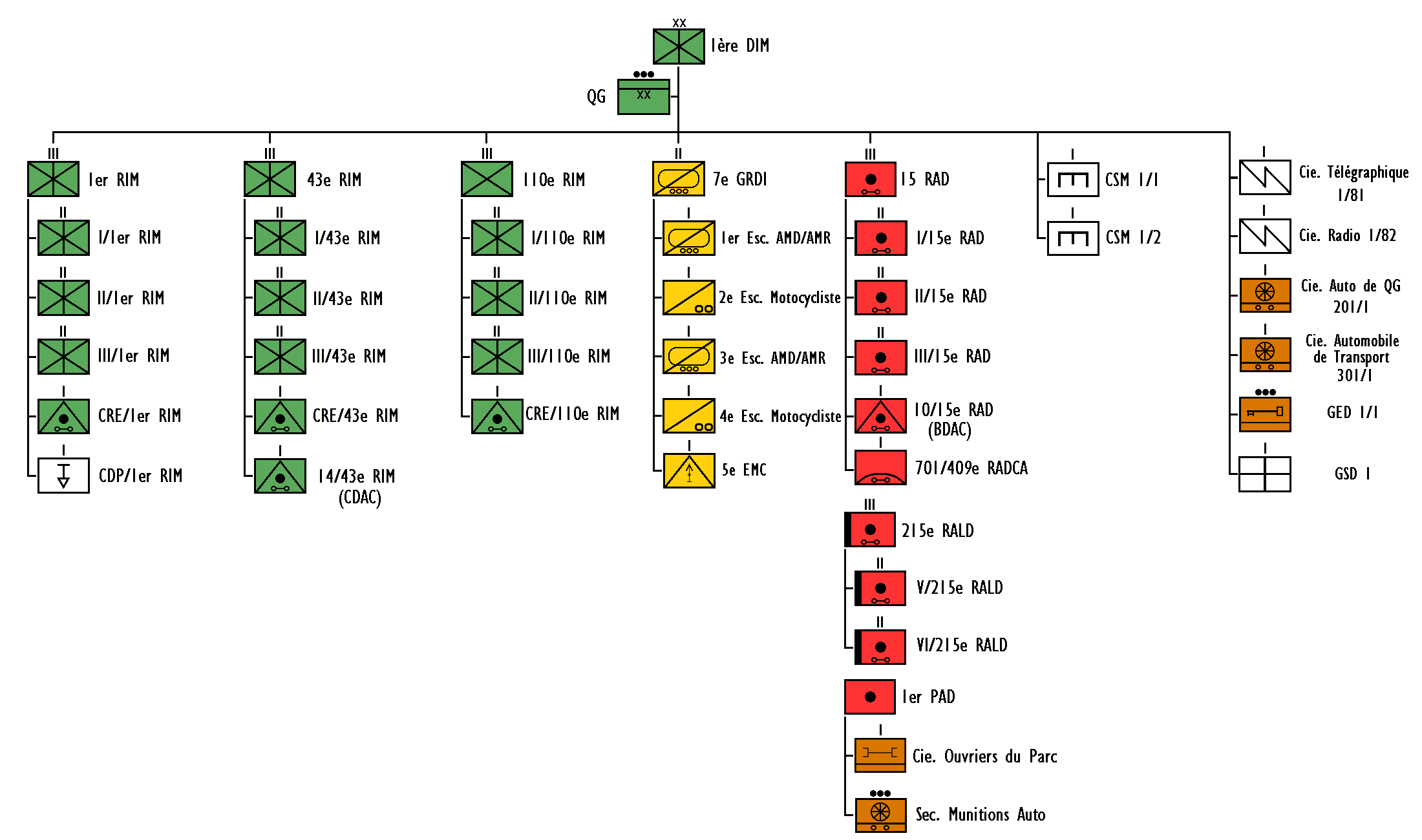
  An organizational diagram of the 1re DIM's composition in May 1940.
- 1st Divisional Artillery Park (1^{er} Parc d'Artillerie Divisionnaire, 1^{er} PAD)
  - Including the 1st Artillery Park Labor Company (1^{re} Compagnie d'Ouvriers de Parc) and 201st Motorized Munitions Section (201^{e} Section de Munitions Automobile).
- Engineer Companies 1/1 and 1/2 (Compagnie de Sapeurs-Mineurs 1/1 & 1/2, CSM 1/1 & 1/2)
- Telegraph Company 1/81 (Compagnie Télégraphique 1/81)
- Radio Company 1/82 (Compagnie Radiotélégraphique 1/82)
- Motorized Headquarters Transport Company 201/1 (Compagnie Automobile de QG 201/1)
- Motorized Transport Company 301/1 (Compagnie Automobile de Transport 301/1)
- Divisional Quartermaster Group 1/1 (Groupe d'Exploitation Divisionnaire 1/1)
- Divisional Medical Group 1 (Groupe Sanitaire Divisionnaire 1)

On the day of the German invasion, 10 May 1940, the 7^{e} GRDI and both the divisional anti-tank batteries (BDAC and CDAC) were detached to form the Groupement Soubeyran, a mechanized cavalry formation, while Transport Group No. 16 (Groupement de Transport n°16) was attached to the division.

=== Combat History ===
In May 1940, the division, along with much of the French 1st Army, was cut off by the German advance to the English Channel and became trapped in the Lille Pocket. The units of the division besieged in Lille were attached to the Groupement Molinié. On 10 June 1940, the division was dissolved and surviving elements which had escaped the encirclements at Lille and Dunkirk were used to form the 1st Light Infantry Division (1^{re} Division Légère d'Infanterie, 1^{re} DLI).

== 1944-1946: Reconstitution as 1st Infantry Division ==
From November 1944, the division was reconstituted in Bourges under the command of General Jean Callies, with personnel drawn from former elements of the French forces of the interior (FFI) from the Lille region. The ex-FFI battalions were renamed:

- 1st Infantry Regiment (1^{er} Régiment d'Infanterie, 1^{er} RI)
- 43rd Infantry Regiment (43^{e} Régiment d'Infanterie, 43^{e} RI)
- 110th Infantry Regiment (110^{e} Régiment d'Infanterie, 110^{e} RI)
- 15th Artillery Regiment (15^{e} Régiment d'Artillerie, 15^{e} RA)
- 12th Mounted Chasseurs Regiment (12^{e} Régiment de Chasseurs à Cheval, 12^{e} RCC)

The infantry and artillery regiments voluntarily took the same name as the units of the 1^{re} DIM of 1940. The division was initially equipped with ex-German equipment, former French army equipment (such as Hotchkiss H35 and H39 tanks, employed by the 12th Chasseurs) and British equipment, in particular that supplied to the FFI units engaged in the Siege of Dunkirk. Due to political disagreements between Charles de Gaulle and the Truman administration, only limited American arms were supplied. It only reached its theoretical strength of 16,150 men in September 1945.

In April 1945, it was placed at the disposal of the French 1st Army and was engaged at the end of April and the beginning of May in the region of Strasbourg. Later, it operated on the left bank of the Danube, to clear the rear of the 2nd Moroccan Infantry Division. In July 1945, the division moved to French-occupied Saarland. It was dissolved in April 1946.

== See also ==
- 1st Free French Division, created in England in August 1940.
- 1st Armored Division (France), created in liberated Northern Africa in 1943, and predecessor to today's 1re division Scorpion.
