= Ferrière-Larçon =

- Commune
- Coat of arms
- Location of Ferrière-Larçon
- Location within France Location within Centre-Val de Loire
- Coordinates: 46°59′38″N 0°52′56″E
- Country: France
- Region: Centre-Val de Loire
- Department: Indre-et-Loire
- Arrondissement: Loches
- Canton: Descartes
- Intercommunality: CC Loches Sud Touraine

Government
  - Mayor (2020–2026): Gérard Henault
- Area^{1}: 20.87 km^{2} (8.06 sq mi)
- Highest elevation: 132 m (433 ft)
- Lowest elevation: 80 m (260 ft)
- Population (2023): 242
  - Density: 11.6/km^{2} (30.0/sq mi)
- Time zone: UTC+01:00 (CET)
  - Summer (DST): UTC+02:00 (CEST)
- INSEE/Postal code: 37107 /37350
- ^{1} French Land Register data, which excludes lakes, ponds, glaciers > 1 km^{2} (0.386 sq mi or 247 acres) and river estuaries.

Ferrière-Larçon (French pronunciation: [fɛʁjɛʁ laʁsɔ̃]) is a commune in the Indre-et-Loire department in central France.

== Population ==
Historical population
Year	Pop.	±% p.a.
1968	505	—
1975	418	−2.66%
1982	348	−2.58%
1990	292	−2.17%
1999	300	+0.30%
2007	284	−0.68%
2012	261	−1.67%
2017	247	−1.10%
2023	242	−0.34%
Source: INSEE

== See also ==
- Communes of the Indre-et-Loire department
