= Boisville-la-Saint-Père =

- Commune
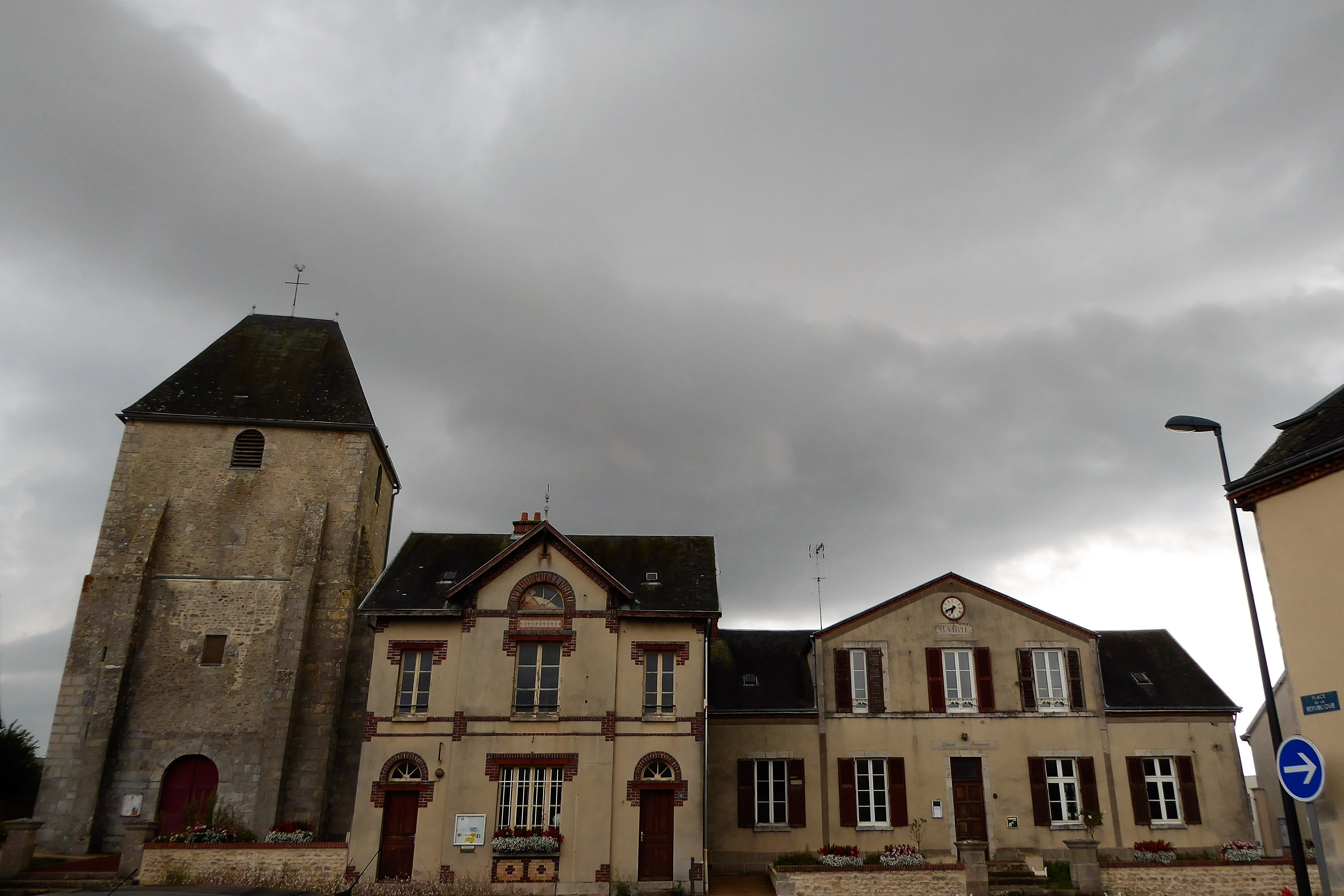
- The church and town hall in Boisville-la-Saint-Père
- Location of Boisville-la-Saint-Père
- Location within France Location within Centre-Val de Loire
- Coordinates: 48°19′42″N 1°41′36″E
- Country: France
- Region: Centre-Val de Loire
- Department: Eure-et-Loir
- Arrondissement: Chartres
- Canton: Les Villages Vovéens
- Intercommunality: CA Chartres Métropole

Government
  - Mayor (2021–2026): Magalie Cathelineau
- Area^{1}: 24.92 km^{2} (9.62 sq mi)
- Elevation: 153 m (502 ft)
- Highest elevation: 154 m (505 ft)
- Lowest elevation: 140 m (460 ft)
- Population (2023): 719
  - Density: 28.9/km^{2} (74.7/sq mi)
- Time zone: UTC+01:00 (CET)
  - Summer (DST): UTC+02:00 (CEST)
- INSEE/Postal code: 28047 /28150
- ^{1} French Land Register data, which excludes lakes, ponds, glaciers > 1 km^{2} (0.386 sq mi or 247 acres) and river estuaries.

Boisville-la-Saint-Père (French pronunciation: [bwavil la sɛ̃ pɛʁ]) is a commune in the Eure-et-Loir department in northern France.

== Population ==
Historical population
Year	Pop.	±% p.a.
1968	558	—
1975	552	−0.15%
1982	638	+2.09%
1990	652	+0.27%
1999	702	+0.82%
2007	717	+0.26%
2012	708	−0.25%
2017	712	+0.11%
2023	719	+0.16%
Source: INSEE

== See also ==
- Communes of the Eure-et-Loir department
