= 1st Colonial Infantry Division =

- Active: before 1906 - July 1914; July 1927 - June 1940
- Country: France
- Allegiance: France
- Branch: French Army
- Type: Infantry Division
- Role: Infantry
- Engagements: World War II; Battle of France

Commanders
- Notable commanders: Henri-Nicolas Frey

The 1st Colonial Infantry Division (French: 1e Division d'Infanterie Coloniale, 1e DIC) was a French Army formation prior to World War I and during World War II.

== Before World War I ==
Prior to the start of World War I, the division was composed of:

- 5th Colonial Infantry Regiment
- 6th Colonial Infantry Regiment
- 21st Colonial Infantry Regiment
- 23rd Colonial Infantry Regiment

However, in the re-organisation immediately prior to World War I, the division was disbanded, with the 5th and 6th Colonial Infantry Regiments going to the French 14th Corps, and the 21st and 23rd Colonial Infantry Regiments going to the French 1st Colonial Corps.

== 1927 - 1940 ==
On 1 November 1927, the 1st Senegalese Colonial Infantry Division was recreated by transformation of the 35th infantry division. It was stationed in Bordeaux, and later renamed 1st Colonial Infantry Division.

It was an active division which existed during peacetime. The Senegalese Tirailleurs Regiments contained troops from French West Africa. The Colonial Infantry and Artillery Regiments were made up of French troops who had volunteered to serve overseas if needed.

During the Battle of France in May 1940 the division was made up of the following units:

- 3rd Colonial Infantry Regiment
- 12th Senegalese Tirailleurs Regiment
- 14th Senegalese Tirailleurs Regiment
- 71st Reconnaissance Battalion
- 1st Colonial Divisionary Artillery Regiment
- 201st Colonial Artillery Regiment

The Division was disbanded after the capitulation of the French Army in June 1940.
