= German invasion of the Low Countries =

The German invasion of the Low Countries included:

- German invasion of the Netherlands
- German invasion of Belgium
- German invasion of Luxembourg
