= 5th Light Cavalry Division =

The French 5th Light Cavalry Division was a French Army division active during World War II. It was led by Lieut. General Baron Subervie.

== World War 2 ==
=== Battle Of France ===
During the Battle of France in May 1940 the division contained the following units:

- 6th Cavalry Brigade
  - 11th Cuirassier Regiment
  - 12th Chasseurs a Cheval Regiment
- 15th Light Mechanized Brigade
  - 5th Armoured Car Regiment
  - 15th Mechanized Dragoon Regiment
- 78th Artillery Regiment

It was a newly formed division.
