= AMR 35 =

French light cavalry tank

Renault AMR 35
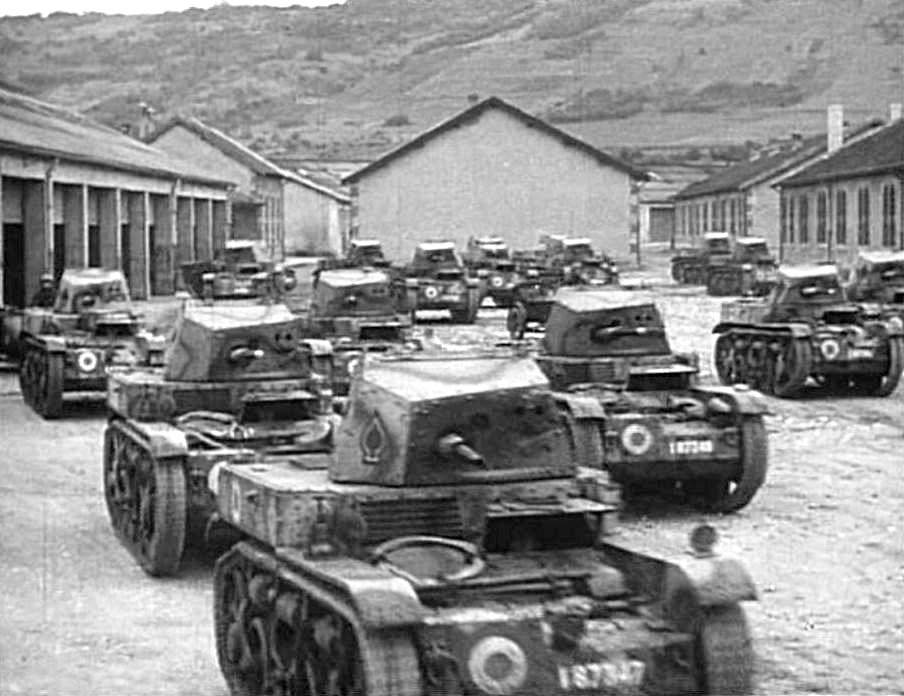
- Type: Light cavalry tank
- Place of origin: France

Service history
- Used by: France; Nazi Germany (captured) (Czechoslovakia) Czech Resistance (captured) (Taiwan) China
- Wars: World War II

Production history
- Manufacturer: Renault
- Produced: 1936 to 1939
- No. built: 167 plus variants
- Variants: ZT 2, ZT 3, ZT 4, ADF 1, YS, YS 2, ZB

Specifications
- Mass: 6.5 tons
- Length: 3.84 m (12 ft 7 in)
- Width: 1.76 m (5 ft 9 in)
- Height: 1.88 m (6 ft 2 in)
- Crew: 2
- Armour: 13 mm
- Main armament: 7.5 mm Reibel machine gun or 13.2 mm Hotchkiss machine gun
- Engine: 4-cylinder petrol engine 85 hp
- Power/weight: 13.08 hp/tonne
- Suspension: rubber reinforced horizontal springs
- Fuel capacity: 130 litres
- Operational range: about 200 km
- Maximum speed: 55 km/h (34 mph)

The Automitrailleuse de Reconnaissance Renault Modèle 35 Type ZT (AMR 35 or Renault ZT) was a French light tank developed during the Interbellum and used in the Second World War. It was not intended to reconnoitre and report as its name suggests but was a light armoured combat vehicle, mostly without a radio and used as a support tank for the mechanised infantry.

The AMR 35 originated from a project in 1933 to improve the earlier AMR 33 by moving the engine from the front to the back. In 1934, a stronger suspension was fitted and the type was chosen to replace the AMR 33 on the production lines that year. Three orders were made by the French Cavalry, totalling two hundred vehicles in five versions, including two machine-gun tanks, two tank destroyer types and a command tank. Later, ten were ordered of a radio communication variant, the Renault YS, and over forty were built of a tropical version, the ZT 4.

The production would be much delayed by financial and technical problems, deliveries only starting in 1936. The AMR 35 proved to be an unreliable vehicle. It was one of the fastest tanks of its day, but its very speed overstressed its mechanical parts. In 1937, it was decided not to make any further orders but organisational difficulties slowed final deliveries of some versions until well into 1940; even by the time of the Fall of France in June 1940 the ZT 4 order had not yet been finished.

During the Battle of France, the AMR 35s were part of armoured and motorised divisions, the vast majority being lost during the first weeks of the fighting. During the remainder of the Second World War, Germany made use of some captured vehicles.

== Development ==
With his AMR 33 not yet being delivered to the French army — this would happen in June 1934 — Louis Renault used two of the five AMR 33 prototypes to improve the type. In the middle of February 1934, he sent the first, N° 79759, to the testing commission, after it had been lengthened and refitted with a much more powerful Nerva Stella 28 CV engine in September 1933, which now was placed at the back, instead of the front, of the vehicle. This was to reduce the effect of engine noise as well as to attain a better weight distribution, two problems that had become apparent in 1933 when the prototypes had been used for manoeuvres. The exhaust pipe was placed at the back and the ventilator moved from the right to the left side. Renault was hesitant to introduce such expensive improvements in the production run; but, in February 1934, the head of the French Cavalry, General Flavigny, insisted on these changes being made.

During testing, the maximum speed was shown to be an impressive 72 km/h. Weight was just 4.68 metric tonnes (to which a 0.25 tonne simulation weight was added), the average road speed 40.5 km/h. However, some cavalry officers pointed out that the Renault Nerva Stella was a sports car and its engine rather delicate and thus unsuited to the rigours of military service. They proposed to use a more robust Renault city bus engine instead. In March, the second prototype, N° 79760, was also lengthened twenty centimetres and fitted with a Renault 432 22 CV four-cylinder bus engine. This vehicle, with a weight of 5.03 tonnes and a simulation weight of 0.75 tonnes, was tested between 3 and 11 April at Vincennes and attained a maximum speed of 63.794 km/h and an average speed of 35.35 km/h. A subsequent order of 92 for the second version with its more reliable engine was made on 3 July 1934. This type, replacing the AMR 33 in the production run, was to have the name AMR 35. Of these, twelve were to be of a platoon command type, fitted with the AVIS-1 turret with a 7.5 mm machine gun and equipped with an ER1 radio set. The remaining eighty vehicles were to have a larger AVIS-2 turret with a 13.2 mm machine gun; 31 of the latter were also intended to be equipped with ER1 radio sets, though in 1937 it was decided to abandon this plan. Also eight radio command tanks were to be produced, which eventually would be called AMR 35 ADF 1, bringing the order to a total of a hundred vehicles.

At this time, however, it became clear that the AMR 33 suspension system, which originally had been intended to be used on the AMR 35, was very unreliable: the suspension units were simply too weak to withstand the forces caused by driving cross-country. A complete redesign of the suspension was ordered, also to be used for the new Renault R35. Three types were considered and tested on AMR 33 prototype N° 79758; the first had the idler resting on the ground; the second had two bogies and five road wheels, like the R 35. This Renault ZB was rejected; however, in March 1936, twelve were ordered by China and four a few months later by the Yunnan province administration. The latter were delivered in October 1938, the former only in 1940. The third suspension type had only one bogie per side and was accepted. The Renault factory designation of the vehicle with the relocated engine and new suspension was Renault ZT; it merely indicates the chronological order of Renault's military prototypes and has no further meaning.

The new suspension was first on a third prototype, newly built in September 1934 from boiler plate; its idler wheel was still of the AMR 33 suspension type and its turret was that of the second prototype.

== Description ==
The production vehicles would differ slightly from the third prototype: they had more riveted, instead of bolted, plates and used the Renault 447 engine.

The AMR 35 was somewhat larger than the AMR 33, being 3.84 metres long, 1.76 metres wide and 1.88 metres tall. It weighed, fully loaded, 6.5 metric tonnes (six tonnes unloaded). The vertical armour plates had a thickness of thirteen millimetres, the sloped plates being nine millimetres thick and the top and bottom plates six millimetres.

Its general configuration was changed in that the engine was moved to the back. Originally, it had been intended to give the driver a more central position to improve his view to the right but eventually he remained at the left side of the hull, the right side being occupied by a large ventilation grill. The turret, where the second crew member, the commander/gunner, was located, was also placed left of centre. Two types of turret were used: the Modèle réglementaire AVIS-1 fitted with the 7.5 mm Modèle 1931 Type C machine-gun and an ammunition stock of 2,250 rounds and the AVIS-2 with a 13.2 mm machine-gun. The 7.5 mm version also had a reserve machine-gun that can be placed on a small mount on top of the turret for AA use. If a radio was present, it was the ER 29, operated by the commander.

The suspension used four much more robust road wheels. The two in the middle were paired into a central bogie, sprung by a horizontal rubber cylinder block, that again consisted of five smaller rubber cylinders separated by steel discs. These cylinders also served as shock dampers, avoiding the problems caused by the oil dampers used with the AMR 33. The wheels in the front and back were independently sprung, again by a rubber cylinder block, but now consisted of four smaller cylinders. The sprocket was in the front. The track was twenty-two centimetres wide and was supported by four top rollers. The wading capability was sixty centimetres, the trench crossing-capability 1.7 metres and a vertical obstacle of fifty centimetres or slope of 50% could be climbed.

The Renault 447 22 CV four-cylinder 5881 cc petrol engine rendered, according to the official French Army manual, a maximum speed of 55 km/h, making it the fastest French tank of its day. Renault brochures claimed the higher speed of 60 km/h and many sources mention the latter number. It had a peak output of 82 hp at 2200 r/m. The average road speed was 40 km/h. The brakes were of the single dry plate type and a Cleveland differential was used. There were four forward gears and one in reverse. There was a Zénith carburettor and a Scintilla Vertex magneto, making it possible to start electrically even at temperatures below zero. A fuel tank of 130 litres gave it a range of two hundred kilometres.

== Production ==
The original order envisaged a first delivery of ten vehicles in December 1934 and a completion in March 1935. This last date was soon postponed to August 1935, but that month production had hardly started yet due to great financial problems with Renault. In June 1935, Renault even refused a second order of fifty, fearing the contractual fines the inevitable delays would cause. However, on 20 April 1936, he accepted an additional order for thirty vehicles, to be delivered before 15 December 1936. Of these, fifteen would be of the 7.5 mm machine-gun version, five of the ADF 1 and five each of two tank destroyer types, the ZT 2 and ZT 3. On 9 October 1936, a third and final contract was signed for seventy vehicles: sixty of the 7.5 mm machine-gun version, half of these without a radio set; and five each of the ZT 2 and ZT 3, with a final delivery before 7 August 1937.

The onset of production was also slowed by coordination problems with the subcontractors: Schneider would produce the armour plates and construct empty hulls; Batignolles-Châtillon would make the AVIS-2 turrets. Final assembly was by Renault.

In March 1935, Schneider delivered the first empty hull. On 20 May, this hull was finished and sent to Satory for tests. When these had been successfully completed on 24 June, another vehicle, the third of the production series, was sent to the STC (Section Technique de Cavalerie) for further testing. The Satory vehicle was fitted with a turret and again tested between 3 and 7 August without serious problems. On 9 August, however, the STC vehicle failed to climb a 50% slope, even though the other vehicle had done so effortlessly. This would be the beginning of a series of severe delays. The Army demanded that the gear ratio be changed and on 2 September refused to accept the first batch of twelve vehicles. On 19 October, the first modified vehicle was finished and the first eleven vehicles were only accepted in January 1936 and the first AMR 35 taken into service on 22 April 1936.

Meanwhile, the Citroën factory had tried to take over the order by developing the AMR Citroën P 103, which had a very novel hydraulic suspension, but this project was rejected.

By 22 February 1936, thirty AMR 35s had been produced; twenty more were being worked on. By the end of June 1936, production numbers had reached 76 tanks, 41 of which had been delivered. At that moment, however, a very serious reliability problem emerged that was to slow down production considerably. Many mechanical parts proved to be too weak; especially the Cleveland differentials, which were not capable of taking the stress loads caused by the tank's high speed. Much of the factory capacity in 1937 was used to rebuild and modify the entire first production batch of 92. On 8 April 1937, Renault was forced to submit two modified vehicles — one of each of the two main versions — for acceptance as "prototypes". This upgrading project did not result in a very reliable vehicle though: in October, the Ministry of War was amazed to find out that out of 43 vehicles, of which the differential had already been replaced five times, six were again in need of a new one.

From August 1937, the 75 gun tanks of the second and third series were taken into production. The first five of these were only delivered between 3 and 5 May 1938, the next ten between 2 and 3 June. On 27 July, 56 had been produced and 34 delivered. The penultimate delivery was on 21 November, the last vehicles were probably produced just before the end of 1938. The second and third batch incorporated the improvements made in 1937 on the first batch but also featured some unique modifications such as a Synchromesh gear box and reinforced chassis girders in the front of the vehicle to ensure a sufficient frame rigidity: a severe distortion had occurred on the earlier vehicles.

The AMR 35 vehicles remained very unreliable: on 1 January 1939, only 129 chassis of all subtypes were present in the combat units, the others being centrally repaired or having been sent back to the factory. Due to the structural delays and technical problems, in 1937, it had been decided to eventually discontinue AMR 35 production and to supplement the existing vehicles by a more reliable and powerfully armed new armoured car, the Gendron-Somua AMR 39.

For Renault, the entire AMR project had been a financial disaster. On 16 November 1938, he begged the government to be exonerated from the contractual fines, pointing out that he had already, on his expense, twice completely replaced the gear wheels on all vehicles and additionally all transmissions and front axles.

== Variants and projects ==
The three orders of 1935 and 1936 called for a production of two hundred vehicles: eighty-seven of the AVIS-1 version, eighty of the AVIS-2 version; thirteen of the ADF 1; ten of the ZT 2 and ten of the ZT 3. However, the total number of vehicles based on the AMR 35 chassis was higher: there would be ten Renault YSs built; the third AMR 35 prototype used the AMR 35 suspension and finally there would be a production of at least forty of the ZT 4, resulting in a grand total of 251 units directly belonging to the larger AMR 35 family. Also two YS prototypes were modified with the AMR 35 suspension and one of these was again rebuilt as the Renault YS 2 prototype, that is generally considered an AMR 35 variant. Apart from these, three AMR 33s were built with the new suspension, two AMR 33 prototypes were rebuilt with it and about half a dozen AMR 33's were likewise modified in 1940. Also, the sixteen Renault ZB vehicles could be considered as belonging to an AMR 35 variant.

=== Heavier armament ===
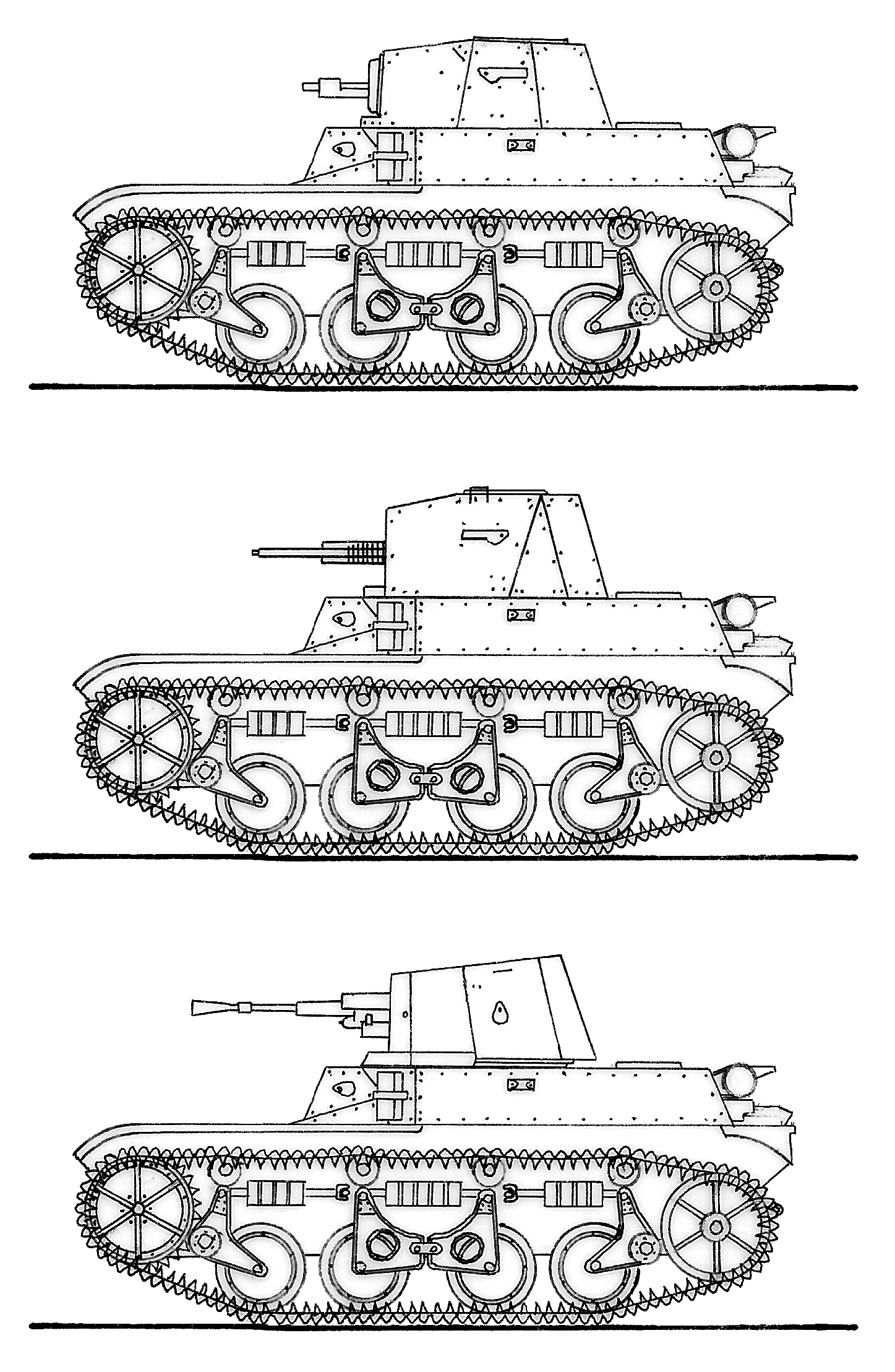
From bottom to top: AMR 35 ZT1 with 7.5 mm machine gun, AMR 35 ZT1 with 13.2 mm machine gun, AMR 35 ZT2 with 25 mm gun.

As the 7.5 mm Reibel machine gun was only effective against the lightest armour at a very short distance because its AP-bullet could just penetrate eight millimetres of armour at fifty metres, several efforts were made to provide some more serious antitank-capacity to AMR units. The first was to uparm the main production run vehicles with a heavier machine-gun. The second was to fit the vehicles with the 25 mm antitank-gun; to this effect, both a tank (the ZT 2) and a self-propelled gun (the ZT 3), were developed. The 25 mm gun vehicles were primarily intended for the reconnaissance units, the Groupes de Reconnaissance de Division d'Infanterie, of the motorised infantry divisions; these were part of the Infantry, but the Cavalry provided the reconnaissance elements. On 22 July 1936, it was decided to assign four of such 25 mm vehicles to each GRDI. The decision to design two types, despite the very small production batches, was motivated by the desire to let them operate in pairs; the low inconspicuous self-propelled gun would directly ambush enemy vehicles and the higher tank, fitted with a radio set, would be further back in an oversight position and, with its rotatable turret, covering the flanks.

However, the Cavalry at first also intended to eventually acquire the ZT 2 for the other AMR units; the general failure of the AMR 35 project ended these plans.

==== AMR 35 à mitrailleuse 13,2 ====
The heavy machine-gun vehicle featured the Modèle réglementaire AVIS-2 turret fitted with a 13.2 mm Hotchkiss machine gun, the Hotchkiss 13,2 mm Modèle 1930 mitrailleuse, which could penetrate 20 mm steel at 500 metres. To accommodate the larger machine-gun, the turret was made higher, more so at the left where the commander/gunner was seated and from which side the gun was fed — normally this was done vertically, but to reduce height the gun had been rotated to the left — giving it an asymmetrical and skewed appearance. This heavier type was produced parallel to the 7.5 mm machine-gun vehicles of the first production batch in a quantity of eighty; it was originally seen as the normal combat version, four of which would be present in a platoon of five. Later, however, production was discontinued: though in 1934 even many battle tanks had been so lightly armoured as to be vulnerable to 13.2 mm fire, such a weapon had already become obsolete for this role in 1936. The gun had an ammunition stock of 1,220 rounds: 740 in 37 magazines of twenty and another 480 in cardboard boxes.

==== ZT 2 ====
The Renault ZT 2 was a tank with a larger octagonal welded steel Atelier de Construction de Puteaux (APX) 5 turret equipped with a shortened 25 mm SARF gun, which had a penetration of forty millimetres at five hundred metres. Despite the name, which reflects that it had been designed by the Atelier de Puteaux forge, the one-man turret, with a weight of 650 kilogrammes, was fabricated by the Atelier de Rueil (ARL), an APX offshoot based at Rueil. It had also been intended to equip the AM 39 armoured car (the Gendron-SOMUA), and the colonial version of the Panhard 178, but apart from the ten ZT 2 vehicles was only fitted to five Panhards, so the planned production of at least 259 remained limited to fifteen.

The plan to produce a ZT 2 was first conceived in June 1935. On 12 December 1935, Renault had been ordered to produce a ZT 2 prototype on a chassis to be taken from the first order of a hundred, but this was annulled when five ZT 2s were made part of the second order. On 27 October 1937, the Renault factory estimated that all ten ZT 2s could be produced simultaneous to the second order production run and on 14 January 1938 it was thought that ZT 2 production could be ended in June 1938. Perhaps this was indeed accomplished as regards the first series of five, N° 95860 - 95864. The last five, N° M 3031 - M 3035, would only be assembled in December 1938. This just pertained to the hulls: none of these had yet been fitted with a turret. A wooden mock-up of one had been delivered on 13 July 1938. Only at the end of 1939 were enough funds made available to produce the turrets and finish the tanks at Rueil, a process that probably extended well into 1940.

The hull of the ZT 2 was largely identical to that of the "ZT 1". Apart from the 25 mm gun, having a stock of fifty rounds, the turret was fitted with a 7.5 mm machine gun, with 2,250 rounds. The turret had both a large roof hatch and a smaller hatch in the back right facet. It had been intended to equip at least one ZT 2, in a ZT 2/ZT 3 platoon of four, with a radio set, but it is uncertain whether any was so modified.

==== ZT 3 ====
The Renault ZT3 was a tank destroyer with the same 25 mm SA 35 L/47 gun in a superstructure on the hull. The development of the ZT 3 took place parallel to that of the ZT 2: a first plan in June 1935, followed by a request to Renault to produce a prototype on 12 December 1935. However, given the absence of a turret, there was no need to wait for its development: Renault was instructed to quickly construct a first vehicle by adding a boiler plate superstructure to the old third AMR 35 prototype, and then sent it to Rueil where a gun could be built in and a cast commander cupola fitted.

APX indicated on 6 April 1936 — the plan to build just a single prototype already having been discarded when the second order was placed — that it desired to have five vehicles ready for the September manoeuvres of 1936. That was a very optimistic assessment, especially given the fact they themselves had not yet sent the superstructure blueprints to Renault. On 26 October, Schneider announced that the five empty hulls could not be delivered before the end of April 1937 — the blueprints had not yet been received. On 27 October 1937 — with the hulls at Schneider nearing completion — APX demanded that between 15 and 20 November a "prototype" (not the original one of 1935) would be provided for acceptance. On 26 April 1938, APX approved the hull but only informed Schneider of this on 5 May.

Meanwhile, between April 1936 and July 1937, Renault and the French government had had a major disagreement over the question which company should be given the order to supply the cast cupola; eventually, this would be Batignolles-Châtillon. It wasn't until 13 June 1938 that Renault assembled the first vehicle (from the first series N° 95865 - 95869), which then went to Rueil to be fitted with the gun. On 9 December, it was finished and Renault could begin the manufacture of the last nine vehicles (including the series M 3036 - M 3040) of the two hundred Renault ZTs: the second hull was delivered by Schneider on 31 October. The deliveries will have extended into 1939; by 2 September 1939, all GRDIs had attained their organic ZT 3 strength.

To create sufficient room within the ZT 3, the hull was raised somewhat; the roof plates on the sides and front sloped towards the apex of the vehicle where a cast rotatable cupola provided the commander some height to observe his surroundings, in what was otherwise a very low and sleek construction. The gun was placed to the right of the driver with a co-axial 7.5 mm machine-gun to its left. There was an ammunition stock of 80 shells and 1,200 rounds of 7.5mm ammunition. As the position of the normal air intake was now occupied by the gun, a large roof ventilation grille was present above the third crew member, the gunner/loader. The fighting compartment was very cramped. No radio was present.

=== Radio communication vehicles ===
==== Renault ADF 1 ====
While AMR platoon commanders used an AVIS-1 vehicle with an ER29 radio set — in theory 57 were equipped with one, though in practice it was often absent — squadron commanders were in need of a vehicle with two sets: one to communicate with the platoons, the second to contact higher command levels. On 15 June 1934, Renault was asked to design a single prototype, to be delivered before 1 February 1935. On 15 October 1934, a second was demanded and eventually, in 1934, eight such vehicles were part of the first order, N° 87438 - 87445. The second order in 1936 included a further five vehicles, N° 95870 - 95874, bringing the total to thirteen.

The type was to resemble the standard gun tank, to avoid making it conspicuous: command vehicles are a standard priority target of enemy fire. For that reason, the enlarged radio compartment was in the form of a superstructure that looked like a rotatable turret — having the general form of the AVIS-2 but without the asymmetry — but in reality was fixed to the hull. In the front of the "turret" was a small gun mantlet that normally lacked any armament but in an emergency situation could be fitted with the portable FM 24-29 machine-gun that was part of the crew equipment. To make sufficient room for an added third crew member, the radio operator, the gear box was moved to the front of the vehicle.

The project was accordingly originally called the ZT avec boîte à l'avant ("ZT with front gear box") but later received the Renault designation ADF 1, again a meaningless code: Renault had run out of two letter codes. The army, for security reasons, seems not to have used any special name, which led to a later confusion with the Renault YS.

Due to a delay in the formulation of the exact specifications for the radio equipment, construction of the first vehicle only began on 14 June 1938. The first two vehicles were sent to Satory on 1 and 2 August 1938. After delivery, the Army built in the radio sets; this process was finished for all ten vehicles in the spring of 1939. The first vehicle used two ER29 sets; the others, conforming to a decision already made in 1936, used a combination of the ER29 and the ER26 ter; in the latter case, the effort to remain inconspicuous was rather spoiled by a very prominent large horizontal radio antenna frame fitted on top of the "turret".

==== Renault YS ====
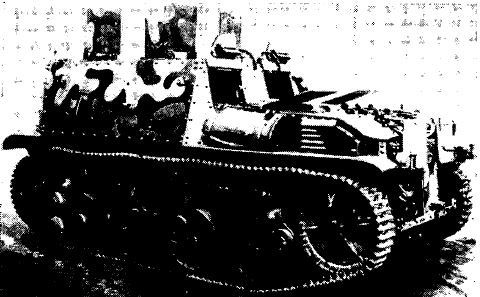
Renault YS command vehicle.

The Renault YS was a version with a large superstructure but without turret, serving as a taller command vehicle. The specifications for such a type had been issued on 9 January 1931: it was then named the Type M. Renault had built two prototypes of boiler plate, based on the AMR 33 chassis, in 1933. General Darius Bloch, head of the technical section of the supreme command, had formed a favourable opinion on these in September 1933 and during a session of the Conseil Consultatif de l'Armement in January 1934 had desired that a dozen be acquired. On 10 April 1934, the order was signed for ten voitures de reconnaissance tous terrain blindés, to be delivered before 31 December 1934, the uncommon term "all-terrain armoured reconnaissance vehicles" intending to obscure the fact that they were command vehicles. They had the factory designation Renault YS.

The prototypes had already been rebuilt with the AMR 35 suspension: to avoid a future disappointment Renault explicitly established in the contract that, due to the more robust and heavier AMR 35 chassis to be used, the series vehicles would have an inferior performance: the weight would increase from 3.5 to 4.3 tonnes and maximum speed would drop from 60 to 55 km/h; average road speed from 40 to 35 km/h.

The ten vehicles, N° 84252 - 84261, were only delivered between 14 and 16 December 1937, after having been tested between 1 September and 22 November 1937 by the Commission de Vincennes. The delay of three years could not entirely be blamed on Renault: the different Arms for which the YSs were intended each had special requirements for the combinations of (short and long range) radio sets to be built in. Some of the latter had not even been developed — the first specifications were only issued in June 1935 — and afterwards for each subtype a special interference suppression had to be applied and thoroughly tested. For these tests the original two prototypes were used.

Of the ten, the Cavalry received four vehicles (reduced from an original planned allocation of six) using the so-called "Type C" equipment: a combination of the ER (Émitteur-Recepteur)26 ter and the ER29. Two of these were assigned to the 2nd and 3rd GAM (Groupe de Automitrailleuses) each. The Infantry also received four. Two of these had the "Type G" equipment: a combination of the ER51 modèle 1935 and the R15 (the last a receiver set only). These so-called type chars vehicles, intended for tank units, were assigned to the 507e and 510e Régiment de Chars de Combat. The two others used a "Type E" equipment with a combination of the ER 26 ter and the R15; these were assigned to mechanised infantry units, the 5e and 17e BCP (Bataillon de Chasseurs Portés). Two Type E-vehicles were also received by the Artillery Arm and assigned to the 1er and 42e Régiment Artillerie.

The versions differed externally in the type of antennae (frames) used. As a whole the type had a very different configuration from that of the AMR 35: in the raised front and superstructure the engine was placed in the front, the driver was seated to the right with the vehicle commander to his left; and behind was a large compartment for two radio operators with a high double hatch in the back. The Artillery used only a single operator in exchange for more supplies. The unloaded weight was considerably higher than predicted, at 5,950 kilogrammes. Fully loaded, including about 0.8 tonnes of radio equipment, weight increased to about 7.5 tonnes, hundred kilogrammes higher than the acceptable suspension maximum indicated by Renault. Despite the fitting of a second fuel tank, the range decreased to 150 kilometres and the reliability of the type was low with much breakage of the road wheel axles.

==== Renault YS 2 ====
The Renault YS 2 was an artillery observation vehicle with advanced telemetric optics, including a rangefinder turret. On 20 July 1936 it was decided by the Artillery to acquire such a type, called the voiture blindée tous terrains d'observation d'artillerie. On 11 August Renault was contacted to build a full scale wooden mock-up of a vehicle capable of accommodating the ER26 ter and R14 radio set, a large number of telephone cable connections and on top an optical rangefinder turret with a base of 160 centimetres. The Renault tank design bureau estimated that such a mock-up could be created for the negligible sum of just 6500 French franc and thus on 21 September made the counteroffer to rebuild one of the YS prototypes for ₣ 195,000, apart from supplying the mock-up for ₣ 9500. However, the ministry of defence refused this offer, just ordering the mock-up on 12 October.

However, on 5 November, Jean Restany, head of the Renault design bureau, decided to rebuild the prototype anyway. On 26 January 1937, the rangefinder was received, but it proved, with a width of 160 centimetres, simply too wide for a chassis that itself was no wider than 170 centimetres, though an attempt was made to place it in a wooden dummy turret. On 2 April, a commission of artillery officers visited Renault and these suggested to use the smaller standard rangefinder used by machine-gun units that had a base of 125 centimetres. This was built in a steel cupola, that also featured a central pair of binoculars and binocular diascopes at the sides and back, that could be protected by armoured shutters. On 22 June, Renault offered to sell this vehicle for the discount price of ₣ 150,000 (mock-up included). On 31 July, the Army agreed; the contract was signed on 7 October 1937.

The vehicle, N° 58993, had already been sent on 8 August and for field tests was assigned to the 309e RATTT (Régiment d'Artillerie de Tracteurs Tous Terrains). Though the Atelier de Rueil had begun to study the possibility of fitting an improved turret in the spring of 1938, no further YS 2s were ordered, despite a continued demand for such vehicles: the Renault YS 2 was considered rather mediocre.

=== ZT 4 ===
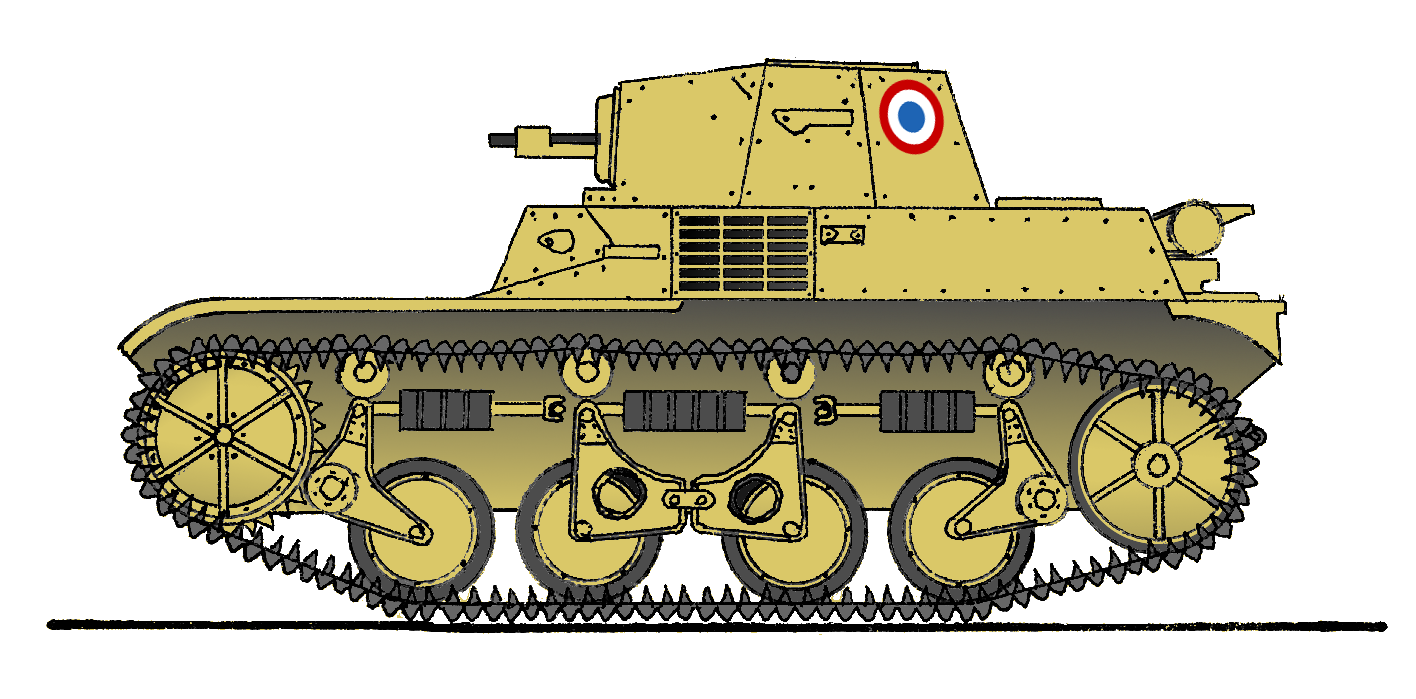
AMR ZT 4 with the AVIS-1 turret, in service in June 1940.

On 9 October 1936, 21 Renault ZT4s, a tropical version with improved cooling, were ordered for the colonial troops to replace their obsolete Renault FT 17's, that were not very suited for the rôle of long range surveillance, typical of colonial conditions. As these troops still used the Hotchkiss 8 mm machine gun as their standard weapon, they wanted six ZT4 vehicles with the same to be produced in France; it was decided in the motherland, however, that it would be cheaper to install the old colonial FT machine-gun turrets on new hulls of the AMR 35, so the latter were to be produced only. Likewise, twelve 37 mm FT 17 turrets could be placed; only three vehicle would thus have the more expensive AVIS-1 turret and this was only allowed in 1937. As the colonies refused this solution — but gave Renault no indication of an alternative — deliveries were to be strongly delayed. The first order, destined for Indo-China, N° 6693 - 66953, had to be delivered between April and 9 July 1937, but not a single vehicle had been built at that date. The same year a second order was made, again of three AVIS-1 vehicles, bringing the total to 24. In May 1938 Renault tested the fitting of a 37 mm FT 17 turret on an AMR 35 chassis but no series production materialised. However, he went into negotiations with Brazil about a "considerable" export of ZT 4s. In the autumn of 1938, the colonies made a third order of 31 ZT 4s, all with the AVIS-1, bringing the total to 55. Though Renault now had sufficient production capacity, the standard AMR 35 order having been finished, the labour and financial problems with his factory, combined with a lack of funding by the government, prevented any ZT 4 manufacture from starting.

Only after the beginning of the Second World War, when more means were made available, was production slowly started: three units were made in February 1940, nine in March, fifteen in April and thirteen in May. However, of the forty hulls produced, not a single turret had been fitted. After the German invasion, an emergency plan was considered to equip them with a 25 mm gun; in the end, some were sent to the front in June armed only with a makeshift machine-gun mount and others remained at the factory. A few were sent into combat with their AVIS-1 turret. That month probably about another seven hulls were finished.

The ZT 4s differ from the "ZT 1" in having large ventilation grilles at the sides and by a changed back, without a stowage box, with a different rear-light and a shortened exhaust pipe.

=== Airborne tank ===
In 1936, the French Army began planning to execute, in case of a war with Germany, offensive airborne operations on the enemy flanks (Netherlands, Switzerland) or hinterland. As no serious artillery support could be given, it entertained the thought of providing fire support to the infantry by airborne tanks, to be landed on captured airfields. A note by the 1er Direction (the Section des Chars de Combat of the Direction de l'Infanterie), dated 18 May 1936, shows that Renault had already begun to study the technical feasibility of such a project. On 26 May 1936, the Renault research bureau offered a possible solution. It proposed to design a light airborne tank, based on the Renault ZT. To save weight several innovative technologies would be applied: the use of light alloys; replacing the original chassis and turret using riveted armour plates with a cast hull and welded dome-shaped turret; the use of sloped armour and finally the use of the turret configuration already in development for the Char G1, featuring a gun mount on the bottom of the tank, obviating the need to install a heavy gun mantlet. By these measures, Renault hoped to limit weight to 5,040 kilogrammes for a maximum armour of thirteen millimetres or 5,400 kilogrammes if the Army desired the higher protection level of twenty millimetres. The height would be 180 centimetres. To make room for a 37 mm gun, the minimal calibre to provide HE fire support, the turret would have a cross-section of 136 centimetres. A hundred shells could be carried and three thousand rounds for the 7.5 mm machine-gun. The crew would be two.

As France at the time had no cargo planes large enough that a tank might drive over a ramp into their cargo rooms, Renault proposed to replace part of the bottom of a Bloch MB.300 bomber with a platform on which the Char Léger transportable par avion could be placed; it would have to be lowered and hoisted by cables. No prototype was ever built.

== Operational history ==
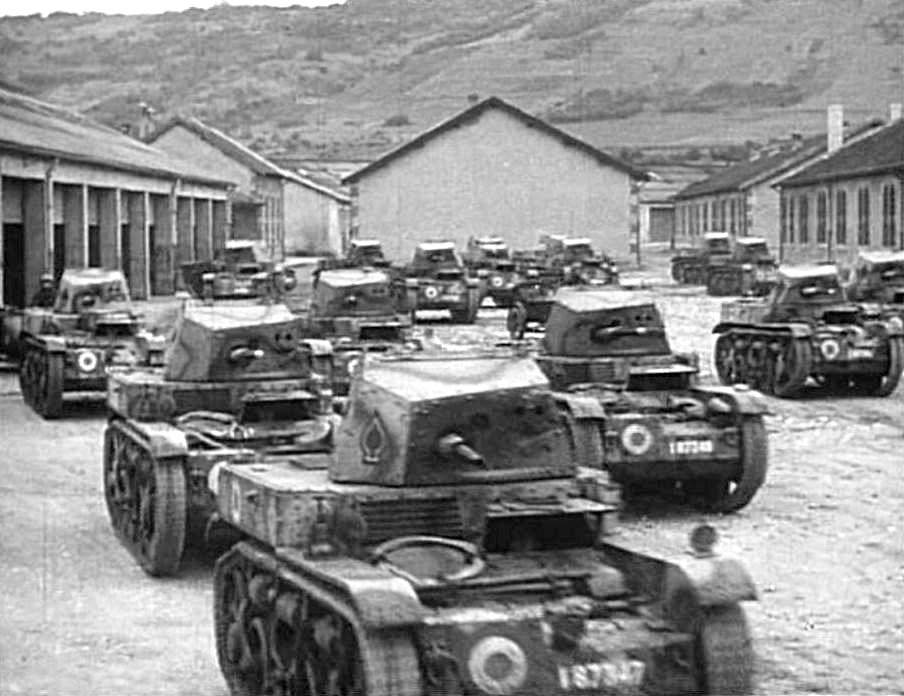
A group of 13.2 mm-armed AMR 35s, belonging to 4e RDP, 1re DLM; the vehicle in front, N° 87347, is the second produced and shows the large rosettes typical of this unit from 1938

=== Tactical function ===
Due to its name, the AMR 35 has typically been described as a reconnaissance or scout tank but this is inaccurate and possibly misleading. Specialised reconnaissance was carried out, not by an AMR but by an AMD (Automitrailleuse de Découverte). The only ZT vehicles that really functioned in the reconnaissance rôle were the ZT 2 and ZT 3 that were part of reconnaissance units, that would distance themselves from the main force in search of the enemy or of routes that were free of enemy presence. The other AMR 35s however, were to the contrary originally intended to be part of the main force and functioned as its, "first contact", direct security screen: this was at the time the meaning of reconnaissance in the French Cavalry doctrine. Even this task, however, would later become secondary to what was to be the AMR's main function: to provide direct fire support to dismounted cavalry or mechanised infantry units; the armoured trucks used by the latter had not even a machine-gun armament.

=== Prewar assignment ===
When the AMR 35 was first introduced, no sharp distinction was made between the AMR 33 and 35, but this was to change in 1937. In 1936 and 1937, two Cavalry armoured divisions were created, the Divisions Légères Mécaniques (DLM) ("Mechanised Light Divisions", with "light" meaning "mobile"). Initially, it was intended that each of these would be equipped with seven AMR squadrons: four of these in their organic armoured brigade, the Brigade de Combat (two in each of two RRCs, Régiments de Reconnaissance et Combat) and three in their mechanised infantry regiment or RDP (Régiment de Dragons Portés). As each squadron had a strength of twenty tanks: four platoons of five each, there was a need for 280 vehicles. There thus seemed a clear prospect of further AMR 35 orders and a necessity for a temporary use of some AMR 33s — indeed, some were taken into service by the DLMs. Within the RRCs, the AMR 35s would have to form a first shock front ahead of the SOMUA S35s, engaging likely enemy light tanks, such as the Panzerkampfwagen I. The use of so many light tanks in a combat rôle had been forced on the Cavalry by a shortage of S 35s: the original procurement plans for the medium tank had been cut in half by budget limitations.

However, in 1936, it was decided to redirect the production of the Hotchkiss H35, an infantry light tank that had been rejected by the Infantry in favour of the Renault R35, towards the Cavalry that decided to use it instead of the AMR 35 in the RRCs, even though the H 35 was not very fast: the AMR 35's poor armour weighed very heavily against it as the French military in this period became increasingly convinced that lightly armoured vehicles could not survive on the modern battlefield. The function of the AMR 35 was thus limited to that of direct infantry support; this was reflected by the later procurement of 7.5 mm machine-gun vehicles only.

The total DLM requirement was diminished to six squadrons, four of them active, or 120 tanks. Therefore, it was decided to relegate all AMR 33s to the older DCs (Divisions de Cavalerie) and even equip one of these, 1re DC, with two squadrons of AMR 35, in its 1e GAM (Groupe d'Automitrailleuses). Apart from these, however, all AMR 35s should be concentrated in the DLMs. Some had already found their way into other units: during the general revision of 1937, they would be reallocated. This involved twelve taken from 6e GAM, four from 7e Chasseurs, two from 3e GAM, two from 9e Dragons and three from the 1re BLM (Brigade Légère Mécanique). From photographic evidence, it is known that earlier other units had made a temporary use of some vehicles.

=== Reorganisation ===
Initially, it was intended to reform the 1re DC into the 3e DLM; its AMR 35s would then automatically reach their proper destination — within a DLM instead of a DC. However, plans were changed at the outbreak of the Second World War in September 1939: on mobilisation, the reserve AMR squadron of the 1st DC was equipped with the Hotchkiss H35 and its stocked AMR 35s relegated to the other seven squadrons — two reserve tanks for each — and another six to the general matériel reserve. At the end of 1939, 1e DC was changed into the 1re Division Légère de Cavalerie.

=== Battle of France ===
In the Battle of France, 120 AMR 33s and 187 ZTs were available. The AMR 35s were used to equip three squadrons in the 1st and 2nd DLM, 66 tanks in each Division; and one squadron of 22 in the 1st Light Cavalry Division, for a total organic strength of 154; each platoon of five typically had two 13.2 mm machine-gun vehicles and three 7.5 mm machine-gun vehicles. The GRDI (Groupes de Reconnaissance de Division d'Infanterie) of the five DIM (Divisions d'Infanterie Motorisée), each had an antitank-platoon with two ZT2s and two ZT3s.

Five AMR 35s were present in the driver school at Saumur and eight were in the general matériel reserve.

Of the ten Renault YSs, four were used by the Cavalry, four by the Infantry and two by the Artillery. The Renault YS 2 prototype, despite not being made of hardened steel, was deployed by the 71e RA, the artillery regiment of 2e DLM.

During the battle, the 13.2 mm machine-gun proved to be incapable of defeating even the German armoured cars at normal combat ranges, its bullets being deflected by their sloped armour. However, most AMR's were lost due to mechanical trouble. All vehicles assigned on 10 May had been lost by the end of the month.

In June, an ad hoc-unit was created, the 7e DLM and part of this was the 4e RAM (Régiment de Automitrailleuses) that used some AMR 35s taken from the matériel reserve.

=== German use ===
The Germans used some AMR 35s as the Panzerspähwagen ZT 702 (f); the Renault YSs were also taken into service. The ZT4s, being brand new, were partly fitted with the 8cm schwerer Granatwerfer 34/1 in an open superstructure to produce a self-propelled 81 mm mortar; some received the AVIS-1 turret.

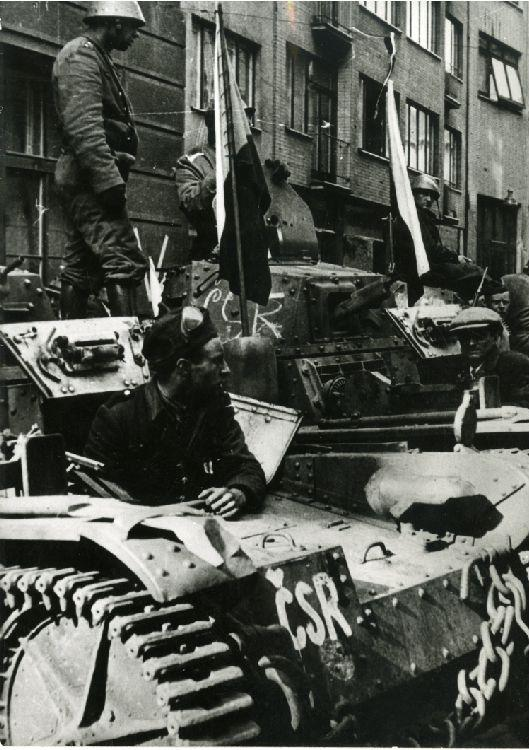
Czech resistance fighters with AMR 35s captured from German forces

Most of these vehicles were used by the occupation forces in France. A certain number (circa twelve including at least one mortar-equipped vehicle) were used by Panzerkampfwagen-Kompanie 539 in Prague for occupational duty in the protectorate of Böhmen und Mähren. In May 1945, three ZT4s had been captured by the Czech resistance and turned against their former owners.

== See also ==
- Tanks in France
