= 71st Infantry Division (France) =

The 71st Infantry Division (French: 71e Division d'Infanterie, 71e DI) was a French Army formation during both World War I and World War II.

== World War 1 ==
The 71st Infantry Division was mobilised on the outbreak of war. It included the 217th, 221st, 309th, 349th, 358th, and 370th Infantry Regiments. The division served in the Alsace, Verdun and Lorraine sectors during the first half of the war. It took part in the Battle of Verdun in 1916, and the fighting in Flanders in May to June 1918, (including the Second Battle of the Marne), and then in the French army's advance on the Aisne front in the autumn of 1918 (the Meuse-Argonne Offensive).

During the first part of the war, it was not attached to a particular Corps, but from June 1917 to the end of the war, it was part of the French XXXVIII Corps.

At various times, it was part of the French First Army, French Second Army, French Fourth Army, French Fifth Army, D.A.L., D.A.N. (Northern Army Detachment), D.A.V. and GQGA.

== World War 2 ==
The 71st Infantry Division was a "B" reserve division, a third-line formation with few regular soldiers on strength and older equipment. The division was mainly formed from Parisian reservists.

During the Battle of France, the Division contained the following units:

- 120th Infantry Regiment
- 205th Infantry Regiment
- 246th Infantry Regiment
- 60th Reconnaissance Battalion
- 38th Artillery Regiment

The division served on the Meuse sector, under the command of the French X Corps, part of the French 2nd Army. During the early phase of the Battle of France, the 71st Division took an active part in the Second battle of Sedan and was subsequently largely destroyed by General Heinz Guderian's XIX Army Corps, in the fighting along the Meuse between 14 May and 17 May 1940 in The Battle of Stonne-Oches.

The division was disbanded on 21 May 1940 and the remaining forces were combined with the survivors of the 55th Infantry Division to form the 59th Light Infantry Division.
