= 1st Divisional Reconnaissance Group =

French military unit during World War II

1er GRDI
- Active: 1939 - 1940
- Country: France
- Type: Cavalry
- Size: Regiment
- Engagements: World War II: Battle of France; Battle of Dunkirk
- Decorations: Croix de Guerre 1939-1945

Commanders
- Notable commanders: Colonel Pierre Préaud

The 1st Divisional Reconnaissance Group (1er Groupe de Reconnaissance de Division d’Infanterie, 1er GRDI) was a reconnaissance group of the French Army which participated in the Battle of France during the Second World War. The group first saw combat along the Meuse in Belgium and conducted a fighting withdrawal, culminating in the Battle of Dunkirk.

== Unit Symbols ==
The unit’s insignia was a red rectangle on which appeared a stylized armored car in black, with a golden “1” on the turret. Superimposed behind it is a galloping horse in gold.

== Command and Composition ==
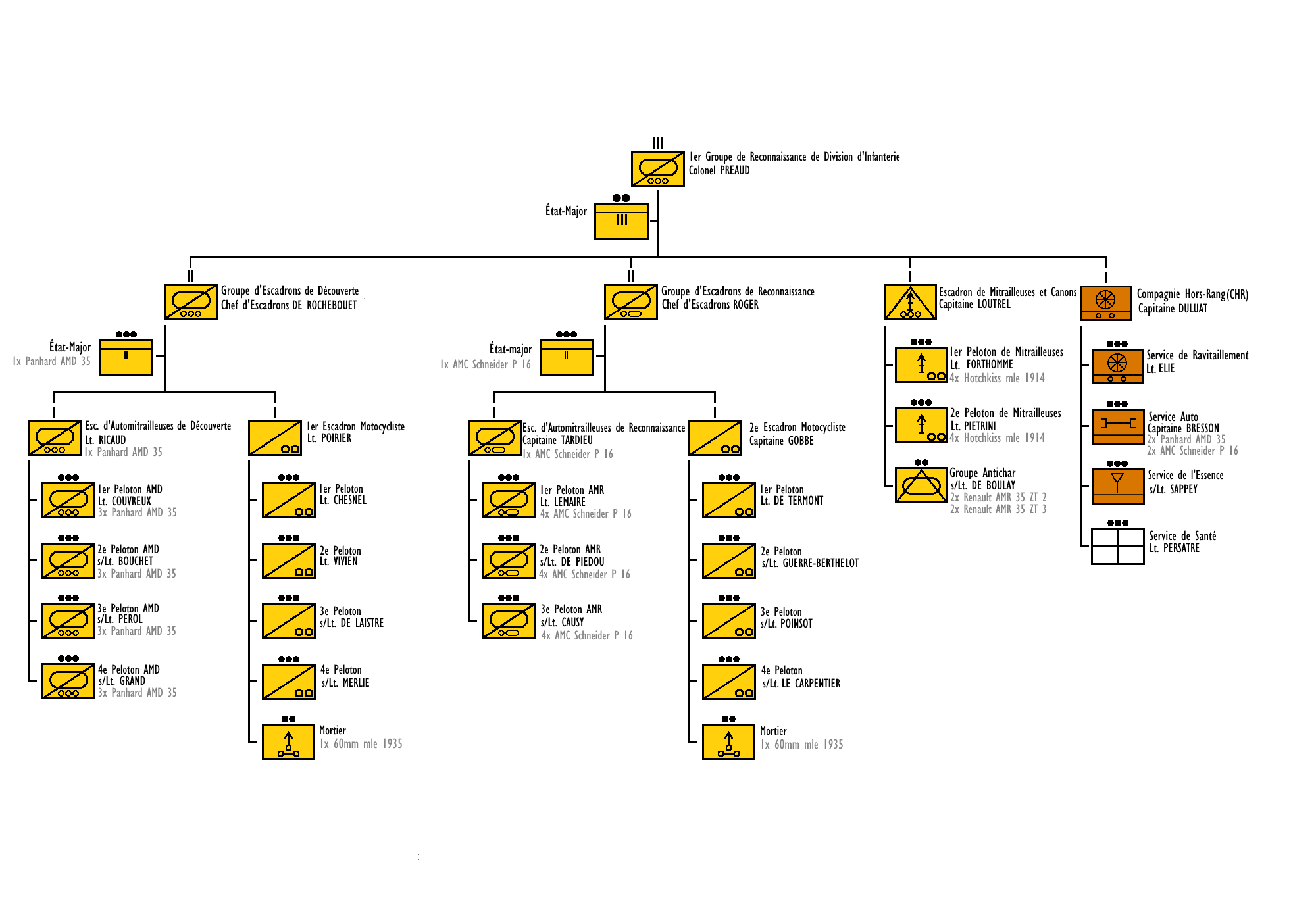
An organizational diagram of the 1er GRDI's composition in May 1940.

In 1940 the 1er GRDI was under the command of Colonel Pierre Préaud and consisted of the following:

- Group of Squadrons (Groupe d'Escadrons de Découverte, GED) - Chef d’Escadrons de Rochebouet
  - Armored Car Squadron (AMD) - Lieutenant Ricaud
    - 1st AMD Platoon - Lieutenant Couvreux
    - 2nd AMD Platoon - Sous-Lieutenant Buchet
    - 3rd AMD Platoon - Sous-Lieutenant Perol
    - 4th AMD Platoon - Sous-Lieutenant Grand
  - 1st Motorcycle Squadron - Lieutenant Poirier
    - 1st Platoon - Lieutenant Chesnel
    - 2nd Platoon - Lieutenant Vivien
    - 3rd Platoon - Sous-Lieutenant de Laistre
    - 4th Platoon - Sous-Lieutenant Merlie
- Group of Squadrons (Groupe des Escadrons de Reconnaissance, GER) – Chef d’Escadrons Roger
  - Armored Car Squadron (AMR) - Lieutenant Tardier
    - 1st AMR Platoon - Lieutenant Lemaire
    - 2nd AMR Platoon - Sous-Lieutenant de Piedou
    - 3rd AMR Platoon - Sous-Lieutenant Causy
  - 2nd Motorcycle Squadron – Captain Gobbé
    - 1st Platoon – Lieutenant de Termont
    - 2nd Platoon – Sous-Lieutenant Guerre-Berthelot
    - 3rd Platoon – Sous-Lieutenant Poinsat
    - 4th Platoon – Sous-Lieutenant le Carpentier
- Weapons Squadron (Escadron de Mitrailleuses et Canons, EMC) – Capitaine Loutrel
  - 1st Machinegun Platoon – Lieutenant Forthomme
  - 2nd Machinegun Platoon – Lieutenant Pietrini
  - Armored Anti-Tank Group – Sous-Lieutenant de Boulay
- Service Company (Compagnie Hors-Rang, CHR) – Capitaine Duluat

The unit was equipped with 16 Panhard AMD 35 armored cars, 12 Schneider P 16s, 2 Renault AMR 35 ZT 2 and 2 Renault AMR 35 ZT 3 tracked 25mm gun carriers. The on-paper strength of the 1er GRDI was 42 officers and 939 men.

== History ==
=== Beginning of the Campaign ===
The 1st Divisional Reconnaissance Group was composed of elements drawn from the 7th Horse Chasseurs Regiment (7e Régiment de Chasseurs a Cheval, 7e RCC) at Évreux, initially equipped with 12 Schneider P16 AMRs, a squadron of Panhard AMD 35s was received in the weeks following mobilization. The various elements of the unit were organized at Allennes-les-Marais near Lille before being sent onwards to Metz, where it was attached to the 5th Motorized Infantry Division (5e Division d’Infanterie Motorisée, 5e DIM). During the winter, the unit was relocated first to Chalons-sur-Marne, and then to the Ardennes. In February 1940 Colonel Pierre Préaud took command of the 1er GRDI. In March the unit moved to Guise and then was put on alert in April, moving to the Hirson sector. Just days prior to the campaign the GRDI received its four armored 25mm anti-tank vehicles, with the last two AMR ZT 2s delivered on May 8th.

On 10 May 1940, the day of the German invasion, the 1st Divisional Reconnaisance Group was detached from the 5e DIM to form an independent cavalry group, composed of the 1er GRDI, 1er GRCA (Army Corps Reconnaisance Group, Groupe de Reconnaissance de Corps d’Armée), and the motorized portion of the 94e GRDI, with Col. Préaud in overall command. This “Groupement Préaud” was placed at the disposal of the 4th Light Cavalry Division (Division Légère de Cavalerie, 4e DLC). As part of the Dyle Maneuver, the cavalry was to cover the left flank of the 9th Army, which was to move into Belgium and dig in along the Meuse, creating a continuous defensive line from Namur to the French border. The 1er GRDI and the other reconnaissance units had the mission of reaching the Ourthe and conducting a delaying action until the French infantry was in place.

Setting off from Hirson and crossing into Belgium, by 1700 on 10 May most of the unit had occupied Fosse, with an advance party under Lt. Poirier, consisting of an AMD platoon and two motorcycle sections, occupying Profondeville. The 1er GRDI suffered its first casualties on 11 May during a strafing attack by Luftwaffe aircraft near Havelange, resulting in two killed, including s/Lt. Grand, commander of the 4th AMD platoon, with four others injured. Near Durbuy an AMR ZT3 became stuck in a ditch while moving aside for a passing tank column and had to be abandoned after it proved impossible to extricate.

On the night of 11-12 May it was determined that the 4e DLC’s delaying action on the Ourthe was completed, with most bridges destroyed by Belgian troops around 1600 on 11 May. The 1er GRDI was ordered to withdraw to a Havelange-Porcheresse line, which was accomplished by 0200 on 12 May, and then at 0930 was ordered to fall back behind the Meuse. Crossing the Meuse at Profondeville at 1600 the unit regrouped at Cottaprez, uninformed about the German movement through the Ardennes.

=== Combat Along the Meuse ===
During the night elements of the 5th and 7th Panzer Divisions succeeded in crossing the Meuse, which had not yet been fully covered by the slower-moving infantry formations. At 0800 Col. Préaud was summoned to the headquarters of the 5th Motorized Infantry Division and received orders that his mobile group was to establish a link between the 4e DLC and 18th Infantry Division (18e Division d'Infanterie, 18e DI), destroy the 5th Panzer Division’s bridgehead at Houx, and form a defensive line on the axis of Moulins-Haut-le-Wastia-Grange. The movement of the French cavalry was badly hampered by heavy air attack by German Stukas. At 1000 recon elements reported that the Germans were 1 km east of Haut-le-Wastia and had already occupied Grange, Anhée and Bois-des-Moulins.

The AMR group under Chef d’Escadrons de Rochebouet occupied the area around Haut-le-Wastia, supported by the self-propelled 25mm guns of the EMC. Units occupying positions in the vicinity of Falaën came under fire from German artillery and suffered some casualties before being withdrawn to the cover of nearby woods. The AMD group under Roger occupied the abbey of Moulins, with recon elements advancing as far as Anhée, making contact with elements of the 129th Motorized Infantry Regiment (129e Régiment d'Infanterie Motorisée, 129e RIM) part of the 5e DIM.

In Haut-le-Wastia proper, an AMD platoon under Lt. Couvreaux and two motorcycle platoons under Lt. Chesnel and S/Lt. Merlie came under heavy air and artillery attack. Around noon German infantry began to push into the village. The elements of the 1er GRDI held the village until 1800 when they were forced to withdraw due to shortage of ammunition; Haut-le-Wastia was occupied by the Germans around 2000. The 2nd Battalion, 129e RIM was dispatched to carry out a counterattack but arrived late, they were instead directed to take up positions south of the town. While directing this movement, Lt. Lemaire was wounded by a sniper and had to be replaced by Maréchal de Logis Michel Cornu, before being relieved by s/Lt Causy later that day.

At 1930, the 2nd Battalion of the 14th Motorized Dragoon Regiment (14e Régiment de Dragons Portés, 14e RDP), which had been in reserve in the Bois de Neffe, was placed on alert and given instructions to prepare to conduct a counterattack against Haut-le-Wastia, which overlooked the 5th Panzer Division’s bridgehead across the Meuse. This battalion was placed under the command of Col. Préaud, who ordered Commandant de Longueau Saint-Michel to deploy his men in the forest near Ronquieres and prepare to attack at dawn, supported by the Schneider P16s of the 1er GRDI.

At 0435 the 81mm mortars of the 14e RDP and the 60mm mortar under the command of Capt. Loutrel’s EMC began a preparatory bombardment followed ten minutes later by an assault, with the dragoons attacking on foot from the northwest. Three AMR 33s of the 14e RDP and two P16s of the 1er GRDI (under the command of Marechaux de Logis Cornu and Lucas) supported the attack. Cdt. De Longueau Saint-Michel accompanied the armored cars on foot, personally directing their fire onto occupied houses. The German defenders withdrew from the village perimeter to the center of town, with the arrival of the French armored cars creating a degree of panic. At 0730 those Germans who hadn't retreated eastwards surrendered, having exhausted their supply of ammunition; 46 prisoners were taken, with 10 dragoons killed and 15 wounded during the fight for the town.

In the wake of the fighting, the Schneider P16s were pressed into service to evacuate critically wounded troops to the rear. As the vehicles had no space for passengers, this was accomplished by balancing the stretchers on the engine compartment. The wounded were thus transported to the battalion headquarters and in this way at least one badly injured man was saved.

=== Fighting Withdrawal to France ===
The French victory at Haut-le-Wastia was local and temporary; 9th Army headquarters, once informed, immediately ordered the cavalry to withdraw- the first German tanks had crossed the Meuse and the 18e DI was beginning to collapse in the face of the enemy, with the German tanks advancing as far as Onhaye. At 0830 the cavalry withdrew from Haut-le-Wastia behind the Molignée river. In the meantime, the armored cars and motorcycles in the Hontoir farm sector were already in contact with German armored vehicles, and carried out a fighting retreat until roughly 1000, with vehicles destroyed on both sides. The GR took up positions between Sosoye and Warnant covering the railway bridges across the Molignée, before withdrawing to the woods near Ronquieres. Around 1700 Sommieres was captured by the 7th Panzer Division, while Col. Préaud sought to organize a defense of Salet and Ronquieres with the 1er GRDI and elements of the 14e RDP and 129e RIM. Crossing the Molignée after dark, the German mechanized columns began to envelop Salet, obliging the French cavalry, now desperately short of ammunition, to withdraw in considerable confusion. Falling back toward Denée, small pockets of resistance at the section and platoon level were established, but higher-level unit cohesion began to break down.

At 0700 on 15 May, the 1er GRDI took position along the railway east of Mettet, with the 14e RDP and 129e RIM to each side. While the morning was calm in Col. Préaud’s sector, to the south the French infantry was rapidly collapsing in the face of the German panzer divisions, and the French 1st Armored Division (1re Division Cuirassé, 1re DCr), diverted to intervene, was badly hampered by poor communication and lack of fuel. By day’s end the German breakthrough was nearly complete.

The GRDI was again in contact on the morning of 16 May- the German 8th Infantry Division, supported by the Panzer divisions, was advancing westwards. At 0830 an AMD squadron and group of 25mm cannons under the leadership of s/Lt. Perol repulsed an attack by German tanks. A second assault at 0900 by the German infantry was also repelled. The supply situation at this point was critical: In one hour of combat, for example, s/Lt. de Causy had exhausted all of the 37mm ammunition in his P16.

Around 1000 the 4e DLC, which had been in position north of the Groupement Préaud, began to withdraw, and the elements of the 1er GRDI and accompanying formations began to be enveloped. The cavalry platoons, benefitting from effective artillery support from the 75mm guns of the 11th Artillery Regiment (11e Régiment d'artillerie Tractée Tous-Terrains, 11e RATTT), of the 5e DIM, were able to resist until noon, but under increasing pressure were forced to withdraw with the assistance of an H 39 tank platoon from the 4th Armored Car Regiment (4e Régiment d’Automitrailleuses, 4e RAM). Capt. Gobbé was wounded during this action. Col. Préaud himself was overtaken by German motorcyclists, engaging them with his revolver, before the timely arrival of a Char B1 of the 1re DCr obliged the Germans to flee. During the course of the GRDI’s retreat, 11 were killed, with many more wounded and a considerable number of vehicles lost.

At 2000 Col. Préaud ordered all units to retreat to the French border as quickly as possible, specifying Felleries, near Avesnes-sur-Helpe, as the rallying point for his unit. Moving through Nalinnes, the motorized column came under heavy attack by German Stukas, resulting in a large number of logistical vehicles and one AMR P16 destroyed. The retreat to France, carried out by moonlight on roads overcrowded with refugees and retreating troops, was extremely disorderly.

The unit crossed the border between Mons and Maubeuge during the night of 16-17 May, around 0600 two AMDs reported that Avesnes-sur-Helpe was already in German hands – one hour later, Capt. Loutrel, uninformed of this, was captured trying to cross the city, but managed to escape during the night and rejoin French forces. Colonel Préaud managed to push through the city in the company of two AMDs which were obliged to fire on the move nearly the whole way. By the end of 17 May he was in contact with the remnants of the 4e DLC north of Cambrai. Another column, meanwhile, under Cdt. De Rochebouet, crossed the Mormal forest after encountering the enemy in Avesnes, reaching Le Quesnoy by nightfall. This group never rejoined the rest of the unit; early on 18 May it was ordered to carry out patrols in the direction of Le Catelet after the sighting of panzers in the area. After clashing with German armor in the vicinity of Catelet the group was obliged to retreat towards Doullens, then Beauvais before finally reaching Montlhéry, south of Paris.

=== Defense of Dunkirk ===
The remainder of the unit under Col. Préaud was reinforced by the 1er GRCA and ordered on 18 May to take up positions between Arleux and Bouchain on the Sensée to cover the withdrawal of the 1st Army. The next day the group under Col. Préaud was reinforced by retreating elements of the 5e DIM and 5e GRDI. On 20 May the 5th Panzer Division reached the Sensée and the 1er GRDI was ordered to hold the bridges in the vicinity of Aubigny, which was successfully accomplished until 22 May, when the unit was relieved by the 25e DIM. On the same day the GRDI, reinforced by elements of the 92e GRDI, was attached to the 5e DIM and ordered to move towards Aire-sur-la-Lys, where the cavalrymen were surprised to encounter elements of the 6th Panzer Division, which had successfully encircled the 1st Army Group from the south.

Over the next several days the 1er GRDI was rapidly redeployed to crisis points around the collapsing Dunkirk perimeter. On 23 May the AMD platoon fought German tanks at Saint-Omer and took a number of casualties defending the bridge at Thiennes, before withdrawing towards Merville. On the 24 May the unit was ordered to Ypres where the Belgian army was collapsing, at the end of the day the bulk of the group was in Isemberg, before being ordered to Ghyvelde the following day.

On 26 May a number of officers and NCOs from the armored car platoons, now largely without vehicles, were evacuated in order to help form new motorized units south of the Seine to contribute to the defense of the Weygand Line. After this, 150 men remained along with one AMR P16 and one AMD 35, and created an ad-hoc formation with the remainder of the 18e GRCA at Bray-Dunes.

On 29 May Capt. Gobbé, Lt. Guerre-Berthelot and a dozen enlisted men were evacuated on the HMS Royal Eagle, leaving Lt. de Termont in command of the remainder of the unit. This group, roughly the strength of a reinforced squadron, was folded into Groupement Mariot, led by Lt. Col. Mariot of the 7e GRDI.

On 31 May and 1 June there were a number of casualties from artillery fire. On 2 June the remaining armored cars launched a counterattack to drive the Germans back across the Basse-Colme Canal, then held off the German 18th Infantry Division before executing a fighting retreat to Coudekerque-Branche. On 3 June, ordered to retreat to Malo-les-Bains on the coast, the final Schneider P16 was sabotaged by Maréchal de Logis Pierre Cornu. On 4 June the remaining men of the 1er GRDI in Dunkirk surrendered.

=== Dissolution and End of the Campaign ===
The portion of the unit which had succeeded in withdrawing south to Montlhéry was incorporated into the 7e DLM in June, with Col. Préaud promoted to brigade commander, Cdt. Roger, Capt. Loutrel and S/Lt. Causy assigned to the 31st Dragoon Regiment (31e Régiment de Dragons, 31e RD), and Cdt. De Rochebouet assigned to the 8e Dragons. The remaining elements were assigned to the 4e and 5e Groupes Francs Motorisées, under the command of Capt. Huet and Capt. Ricaud respectively, and the 121e GRDI, to which Capt. Tardieu was assigned. All were engaged along the Somme from 8 June onwards, with some elements continuing to fight as far as the Loire, participating in the defense of Saumur on 20 June.

== Honors and Memorials ==
The 1st Divisional Reconnaissance Group was twice cited in the orders of the army for its actions, with both citations bestowing the Croix de Guerre with Palm. Order of the Army n°115 recognized the contributions of the unit as part of Groupement Préaud during the fighting along the Meuse and Sambre. Order of the Army n°1919bis recognized the unit’s contribution to the defense of Dunkirk as part of Groupement Mariot.
