= Groupes Franc Motorisé de Cavalerie =

Groupe Franc Motorisé de Cavalerie
- Active: May - August 1940
- Country: France
- Branch: Armée de Terre
- Role: Combined Arms Team; Special Forces; Independent Armored Squadron
- Size: 5 groups created with 170-250 men each
- Engagements: World War II; Battle of France; Battle of Saumur

Commanders
- Notable commanders: François Huet; Robert Jean Marie de Neuchèze; Robert M Gerard (né Gueiroard)

The Groupes Franc Motorisé de Cavalerie or GFC was a type of autonomous unit of the French Army created during the Nazi Invasion. Taking inspiration for their name from the Corps Francs which had played an important role in the Phoney War, they were a very early attempt to create truly independent Combined Arms Combat Teams. Although little more than Company sized, they had organic Armored, Artillery, and Infantry elements all rolled into one small and highly mobile force. They were created somewhat out of desperation in response to the rapid German advance into France and operated as independent strike forces with great latitude of movement. Although they were found to be quite effective, their existence died with the Third Republic.

== Creation and missions ==
The Groupes Francs Motorisés de Cavalerie were formed in the chaos of late May 1940 during the Battle of France. They were composed of two squadrons each, principally by regrouping the remnants of the Groupes de Reconnaissance de Division d'Infanterie (GRDI) from the shattered French Infantry Divisions returning from The Invasion of the Low Countries, especially from the 1st GRDI. These were a special type of Division level mechanised reconnaissance element. They also included young recruits pulled from training at the Montlhéry School of Mechanised Combat. They were created entirely from volunteers and had a high degree of morale and esprit de corps.

The 1st, 2nd, and 3rd Groupes Franc were officially stood up on 21 May 1940 and Groupes 4 and 5 on 25 May 1940.

The officially stated mission of the Groupes Franc, reflecting the desperate military situation out of which they were born, were:

- Delaying Combat
- The security of General Staff Headquarters
- Reconnaissance
- Mobile Reserve Force

They were small units, approximately Company sized, and commanded by a captain. They grouped together the combat power of tanks, machine gun carriers, 25mm and 47mm anti-tank guns, infantry equipped with Heavy Machine Guns, armed motorcycle and sidecar teams, as well as organic truck transport for all personnel and mobile fuel supplies for all vehicles. Their equipment was all newly issued and of the latest version. This included medium tanks (Somua modèle 1935 & Renault AMC 35), AMD Panhard 178 light armored reconnaissance vehicles armed with 25mm Autocannons, Hotchkiss H39 light tanks, and Laffly W15 TCC Trucks

== The Battle of France ==
Each Groupe Franc, composed of armor, artillery, and infantry, acted autonomously as a mini army unto itself within the zones to which they were assigned. Most often, they fought on their own at the disposition of their assigned zone's combatant commander General. They were often utilized as a mobile reserve force and sent to wherever the fighting was worst.

Initially assigned to the defense of the river Somme, GFC's 1, 2, 4, and 5 were eventually deployed to positions around Rouen from 6 June 1940 in anticipation of the coming battle there. Suffering extremely heavy casualties, they were used to guard the bridges across the Seine. The all-volunteer units refused to retreat from these positions until after they were effectively destroyed by larger German forces.

In the words of then 1st Lieutenant Robert M Gueiroard (later Gerard), the executive officer or 5th GFC, "The specific mission of our Groupe Franc was to fight a rear guard action, protecting the retreat of an infantry division. We were, in fact, a special anti-tank unit, charged with protecting the division from attacks by [German] armor. The Groupe Franc was a sort of "suicide unit" as illustrated by the fact that, of the 250 men 5th Groupe Franc [began the battle with], more than 100 were killed, 50 wounded, 80 taken prisoner, and only 17 returned."

== Order of battle (6 June 1940) ==
The five Groupes Francs Motorisés de Cavalerie (GFC) were rapidly created at the French Army's military motorcycle and scout car school (COMAM – Centre d'organisation de motocyclistes et automitrailleuses) in Montlhery starting on May 21, 1940, in response to the events in the Battle of Belgium. They consisted entirely of volunteers and became operational between June 3–6, 1940. On paper, each of the five groups were to have:

- 1 Motorcycle Platoon
- 1 Tank Platoon of 5 tanks (Somua S-35, Renault AMC 35 or Hotchkiss H39)
- 1 Scout car Platoon of 5 Panhard 178s
- 2 anti-tank sections, one with 2 25mm cannons, the other with 47mm canons, both equipped with Laffly W15 TCC Trucks
- 1 Platoon sized element of Infantry armed with Heavy Machine Guns and mortars

On 10 June, the French Order of Battle of the French 10th Army included the 1st, 2nd, 4th, and 5th GFC's

- GFC no 1 under Captain Robert de Neuchèze was initially composed of
  - 1 command platoon
  - 2 tank platoons (1 with 5 Hotchkiss H39, the other with 7 Renault AMC 35)
  - 1 anti-tank section with 2 25mm cannons
  - 1 mortar platoon
  - 1 company of motorized infantry
- GFC no 2 under Reserve Lieutenant Pierre Heilbronn (KIA June 9, 1940) and Lieutenant Pierre Huot
  - 1 motorcycle platoon (motorcycles and sidecars)
  - 1 tank platoon with 2 Somua S-35 tanks
  - 1 scout car platoon with 2 Panhard 178s
  - 1 anti-tank section with 2 SA 37 47mm canons
- GFC no 3 under Captain François de Fürst
  - 1 command platoon
  - 1 motorcycle platoon
  - 1 scout car platoon
  - 1 light tank platoon
  - 1 mechanised infantry platoon
  - 1 anti-tank section with SA 37 47mm canons
  - 1 anti tank section with 25mm cannons
- GFC no 4 under Captain François Huet and Lieutenant de Marolles
  - 1 command platoon
  - 1 motorcycle platoon (sidecars and motorcycles)
  - 1 tank platoon with 2 Renault AMC 35 (with a 3rd left behind for engine problems)
  - 1 scout car platoon with 4 or 5 Panhard 178s
  - 1 anti-tank section with 2 SA 37 47mm canons
  - 1 anti tank section with 2 25mm cannons
  - 1 heavy machine gun platoon
  - 1 mortar platoon
  - Manned by 177 men (8 officers, 19 NCO's, and 150 troopers)
  - The 4th GFC was intended to have 10 Somua S-35 tanks but they never materialized.
- GFC no 5 under Captain Ricaud and Reserve 2LT Robert Marius Gueiroard
  - 1 command platoon with 1 command car, 6 sidecar motorcycles, and 4 specialist vehicles (radio car, telephone car, maintenance car, and mobile kitchen) (62 men)
  - 1 motorcycle platoon with 18 sidecar motorcycles and 6 machineguns (35 men)
  - 1 tank platoon with 5 Somua S-35 tanks (14 men)
  - 1 scout car platoon with Panhard M-1939s (19 men)
  - 1 anti-tank platoon with 2 SA 37 47mm canons, 2 Laffly W15 TCC prime mover trucks, 4 GMC Trucks (34 men)
  - 1 anti tank platoon with 2 25mm cannons, 2 machine guns, 4 half-tracks (30 men)
  - 1 heavy machine gun platoon with 6 heavy machine guns, 6 GMC Trucks and 1 command car (48 men)
  - Formed May 26, 1940, operational June 3, 1940
  - 249 Men (8 Officers, 241 NCOs and troopers). Around half of the soldiers in GFC no 5 came from the French Foreign Legion. About a quarter of the men had been active duty soldiers prior to the war, the other three quarters having been mobilized in the two years prior.
- At the formation of the GFCs, Captains Huet and Ricaud were fresh from two weeks of combat in Belgium and the Pas de Calais, both at the head of a squadron of the 1st GRDI (Reconnaissance group of the 5th Motorized Infantry Division (5e DIM) commanded by Colonel Pierre Préaud. The 1st GRDI was disbanded on May 31, 1940, and a portion of its men and equipment helped form the 4th and 5th GFCs.

== Notable members ==
- Capitaine Robert de Neuchèze (1904–1944), commander of the 1st GFC, Officer of the Légion d'honneur and the Medal of the Resistance. A graduate of Sant Cyr (1925–1927), Captain Neuchèze raised and led the 1st GFC through the Battle of France. On May 27, he was wounded by German fire when his lead element came into contact with German forces while conducting a reconnaissance patrol of in the vicinity of the village of Drancourt near Abbeville. Taken to hospital, he was given 4 months of convalescence by the doctors. After 10 days, he left the hospital and retook command of the 1st GFC. In preparation for the coming Armistice and the capitulation of French Forces, Marshall Petain gave orders to all French forces for a cease fire on 17 June 1940. Ignoring this order, Neuchèze led his 1st GFC, with a strength of 217 men, to Saumur where they joined up with other French forces at the French School of Cavalry to participate in Battle of Saumur, often considered the first act of the resistance. After surviving the heroic last stand at Saumur, Neuchèze took his surviving men and equipment South into Vichy territory to link up with the 2nd Regiment of Dragoons at Auch in September 1940. There he went on to become an important figure in the French Resistance, pretending to be a loyal Vochy unit while caching French military materiel for later use. After the Nazi Invasion of the Free Zone in November 1942, he took command of the French Resistance in the Gers Department in Southwest France. Arrested in August 1943, he escaped and traveled to North Africa aboard the L'Aréthuse, a Free French Navy submarine in September 1943 taking with him the colors of the 2nd Dragoons. In North Africa, he joined the Free French Army where he was promoted to Chef D'Escadrons (Cavalry Major) and given a command in the 2nd Dragoons when it was stood back up on 21 December 1943, at Sfax, Tunisia. He went ashore with his command during the Amphibious Landings in Provence of August 1944. He was later killed in action in the capture of Autun on September 9, 1944.
- Reserve Lieutenant Pierre Heilbronn (1895–1940), commander of the 2nd GFC. Heilbronn was made Knight of the Légion d'honneur in 1918, at the age of 23, after being wounded 3 times and cited for bravery 6 times in World War I. Between the wars, Heilbronn was a cofounder of the newspaper Les Nouvelles Littéraires. Heilbronn was killed in action in the fighting at the Bridge of Andelys on June 9, 1940, during the Defense of the Seine. He was posthumously promoted to Officer of the Légion d'honneur.
- Lieutenant Pierre Huot (1904–1987), commander of the 2nd GFC. Taking command after the death of Heilbronn, Lieutenant Huot distinguished himself in the defense of the village of Boos during the Defense of the Seine. Following the Armistice, Huot traveled to North Africa and joined the Free French Forces as a captain in the 1st Regiment of African Chasseurs (1st RCA) in July 1941. He went on to land in Provence in August 1944 with the French 5th Armored Division (5th DB). By March 1945, he commanded a squadron of the 6th African Chasseurs (6th RCA). In April 1945, he was wounded while fighting in Germany in the closing days of the war. He went on to be promoted to Chef d’Escadrons (Major) the following December. Huet served in Indochina from 1953 to 1955 and then in Morocco from 1955 to 1958 before being promoted to brigadier general in 1961. Huet finished his career as second in command of the French School of Cavalry at Saumur.
- Capitaine François Huet (1905–1968), commander of the 4th GFC. A graduate of Saint Cyr, Huet spent much of his pre-war career in French Morocco where his view of the role of a military officer was greatly influenced by Lyautey. During the battles of Belgium and France, Huet distinguished himself for his audacity and calm under fire. Huet was commander of the 1st Group of Infantry Divisional Reconnaissance (1st G.R.D.I.) in Belgium, the remnants of which formed the bulk of the original GFC groups. As commander of the 4th GFC, Huet distinguished himself in the fighting at the Pont-de-l'Arche near Rouen on June 8–9, 1940 where his small unit succeeded in slowing the advance of Erwin Rommel's 7th Panzer Division. After the Armistice, Huet took a posting working for the relocated Vichy French National Military Academy in Aix en Provence. Here he directed the liaison between the French Army and the Chantiers de Jeunesse (Vichy French paramilitary youth group). Following the Invasion of the Free Zone in November 1942, Huet became Secretary General of the Compagnons de France, an organisation which became a breeding ground for the Resistance. In this role, he was responsible for the development of the "Alliance" network which linked together diverse French Resistance groups in the south of France, eventually coalescing into the Maquis of Vercors. Huet served as Military Chief of the Vercors Maquis and was instrumental in the crafting of Operation Montagnard which turned the Vercors Massif into a fortress manned by 4000 Resistance fighters. When the promised Allied reinforcements failed to materialize, the short-lived Republic of Vercors was crushed by a force of 10,000 Axis soldiers in Operation Bettina, one of the last Nazi Airborne Operations of the war. After the Allied Southern Landings, Huet joined back up with the Free French Forces for the end of the war and the occupation of Germany. After World War II, Huet went on to serve as brigadier general of the 7th Mechanised Division in Algeria. He went on to become Corps General in charge of the military district of Lille. In the end, General Huet served the French Army for 42 years, 15 of them in military campaigns in Europe and North Africa. He was made Grand Officer of the Légion d'honneur in 1960.
- Aspirant Guy Dubern (1917–2012), Tank Platoon Leader in the 4th GFC and later aide de camp to Captain Huet. Dubern was, by trade, an agricultural engineer who was awarded the Order of the Army for his service in the war. After the Armistice, he served with the Free French Forces as a Platoon Leader for a tank platoon in the 1st Armored Division and the 3rd Regiment of African Chasseurs from 1944 to 1945, participating in the Siege of Colmar, the Battle of Alsace, and the Battle of Wurttemberg. Then Sous Lieutenant Dubern was part of the first contingent of French troops to occupy Berlin.
- Capitaine Ricaud (1904–1987), commander of the 5th GFC. Joining the French Army in 1921, Ricaud, like Huet, was recognized by superiors for his brilliance in the combat in Belgium and Northern France with the 1st Group of Infantry Divisional Reconnaissance (1st G.R.D.I.) (The organic reconnaissance element of the 5th Motorized Division where he commanded a squadron of Panhards. He was given a field promotion to captain in May 1940 and was given command of the 5th GFC. After the Armistice, he served with the Free French as a Squadron Commander first in 6th RCA in the Levantine Campaign, and later with the 9th RCA from 1944 to 1945. Ricaud became a Reserve Major after the war, before eventually retiring.
- Reserve Sous Lieutenant Robert Marius Gueiroard (AKA Gerard)(1917–2013), Executive Officer of the 5th GFC. After the Armistice, he traveled to the United States where he earned an MBA from Harvard Business School in 1941. He went on to serve on General Eisenhower's staff as a Psychological Warfare Officer and wrote the book "Tank-Fighter Team" (ISBN 1616460237) about his 1940 experiences in 1942. After the war he moved to California where started a family and worked in Hollywood as a writer and director before attaining his Ph.D. in psychology from UCLA in 1958. He spent the rest of his life as a practicing psychologist and was an early pioneer in transpersonal psychology.
- Jehan Alain (1911–1940) was a French composer and organist before the war. He volunteered to serve in the GFC and was posthumously awarded the Croix de Guerre for his bravery in making a solitary stand against an assaulting motorized platoon of German soldiers on June 20, 1940, during the Battle of Saumur. Armed with only his carbine, Alain killed 16 German soldiers before being overrun. He was buried, by the Germans, with full military honours.

== Influence ==
The heroic rear guard actions of the Groupes Franc Motorisé de Cavalerie had a lasting impact in the psyches of many Frenchmen in the resistance. The name "Groupes Franc" was carried on in the resistance where Groupes Franc (GF) were formed as autonomous mobile strike teams of resistance fighters. These later Resistance Groups Franc conducted many of the more audacious commando raids in occupied France. Among their more famous exploits was the Groupe Franc led by André Bollier's liberation of Berty Albrecht from imprisonment at the Vinatier Psychiatric Hospital in Bron on December 23, 1942. The Groupes Franc were also given the task of liberating Paul Reynaud, but he was moved to Germany before the plan could be acted upon.
