= Pierre Préaud =

French Army officer (1891–1955)

Personal details
- Born: 1 April 1891 Alençon, France
- Died: 21 October 1955 (aged 64) Aix-en-Provence, France
- Spouse: Anne Joséphine Lussigny (m. 1919)
- Parents: Henri Michel Préaud (father); Thérèse Madeleine Pille (mother)
- Education: École spéciale militaire de Saint-Cyr

Military service
- Allegiance: French Third Republic; Vichy France; Free France; French Fourth Republic
- Branch/service: French Army
- Years of service: 1913–1950
- Rank: Army Corps General
- Commands: List of commands: 1st Divisional Reconnaisance Group (1er GRDI); École spéciale militaire de Saint-Cyr; 2e Région Militaire; 11e Région Militaire; 3e Région Militaire; 10e Région Militaire
- Battles/wars: First World War Second World War: Battle of France; Battle of Dunkirk

Général de Corps d'Armée Marie Henri Pierre Préaud (1 April 1891 - 21 October 1955) was a French military officer who served in World War I and World War II. A graduate of the École Spéciale Militaire de Saint-Cyr class of 1913, he commanded the 1st Divisional Reconnaisance Group during the Battle of France. Under the Vichy regime, Préaud served as the Commandant of Saint-Cyr before joining the ORA resistance organization in 1943. From September 1944 he commanded several military regions before retiring from the armed forces in 1950.

== Military career ==
Pierre Préaud attended Saint-Cyr from 1910-1913, graduating with the "de la Moskowa" promotion. He participated in World War I as a cavalry officer. In 1920, while a captain at the École d'Application de Cavalerie in Saumur, he was named a Chevalier of the Legion of Honor.

In 1936, he was promoted to Lieutenant-Colonel, and a full Colonel in 1939. In February of 1940, Préaud was placed in command of the 1st Divisional Reconnaisance Group (1er Groupe de Reconnaisance de Division d'Infanterie, 1er GRDI), a motorized cavalry formation attached to the 5th Motorized Infantry Division (5e Division d'Infanterie Motorisée, 5e DIM). In May 1940, he formed an ad-hoc formation called Groupement Préaud, incorporating other cavalry units, which advanced to the Meuse in Belgium to screen the 9th Army as part of the Dyle maneuver. The 1er GRDI was heavily engaged during the German invasion of France, eventually covering the evacuation from Dunkirk from late May to 4 June 1940. The 1er GRDI was twice cited in the orders of the army for its conduct under fire, earning the Croix de Guerre with Palm.

Following the signature of the June 1940 Armistice, Préaud was named Commandant of Saint-Cyr, a post he would hold until September 1942. With instruction relocated to the south of France due to the German occupation, he also oversaw the l’Ecole Militaire de l’Infanterie et des Chars de Combat (Military School for Infantry and Tanks) in Aix-en-Provence. He was promoted to Brigadier-General in 1941.

Following the German occupation of Vichy France in 1942, Préaud joined the Resistance Organization of the Army (ORA). During the allied liberation of France in 1944, Préaud was placed in command of the 2nd Military Region, where his work was centered on integrating resistance fighters from the French Forces of the Interior (FFI) into the new French army. In February 1945 he was promoted to Général de Division.

Following the allied victory in 1945, Préaud would hold a number of territorial commands. He was named a Grand Officer of the Legion of Honor in 1947. He was promoted to Général de Corps d'Armée in 1949 and retired in 1950. He was killed in a car accident in 1955.

== Honours and decorations ==
- Commander of the Legion of Honor
- Commander of the Legion of Merit (United States)
- Croix de Guerre 1914-18
- Croix de Guerre 1939-45
