= 5th Motorized Division =

The French 5th Motorized Infantry Division (5^{e} Division d'Infanterie Motorisée, 5e DIM) was a French Army division active during World War II.

== World War 2 ==
=== Command and Composition ===
In May 1940 the 5th Motorized Infantry Division was under the command of Brigadier General Jean-Noël-Louis Boucher and contained the following units:

- 8th Motorized Infantry Regiment (8^{e} Régiment d'Infanterie Motorisée, 8^{e} RIM)
  - Including Divisional Pioneer Company (Compagnie Divisionnaire de Pioniers, CDP)
  - Including Divisional Anti-Tank Company (Compagnie Divisionnaire Anti-Chars, CDAC) with 25mm SA 34 anti-tank guns.
- 39th Motorized Infantry Regiment (39^{e} Régiment d'Infanterie Motorisée, 39^{e} RIM)
- 129th Motorized Infantry Regiment (129^{e} Régiment d'Infanterie Motorisée, 129^{e} RIM)
- 1st Divisional Reconnaissance Group (1^{e}^{r} Groupe de Reconnaissance de Division d’Infanterie, 1^{e}^{r} GRDI)
  - Composed of one Panhard 178 armored car squadron, one Hotchkiss H 39 light tank squadron, two motorcycle squadrons, and a motorized heavy weapons squadron with a platoon of AMR 35 ZT2/3 tankettes.
- 11th Divisional Artillery Regiment (15^{e} Régiment d'Artillerie Divisionnaire, 15^{e} RAD)
  - Three 75mm artillery groups plus Divisional Anti-Tank Batterie (Batterie Divisionnaire Anti-Chars, BDAC) with 47mm SA 37 anti-tank guns, and an attached battery from the 409th Air Defense Artillery Regiment (409^{e} Régiment d'Artillerie de Defense Contre Aéronefs, 409^{e} RADCA) with 25mm CA mle 38 anti-aircraft guns.
- 211th Heavy Divisional Artillery Regiment (211^{e} Régiment d'Artillerie Lourde Divisionnaire, 211^{e} RALD)
  - Two 155mm heavy artillery groups.
- 5th Divisional Artillery Park (5^{e} Parc d'Artillerie Divisionnaire, 5^{e} PAD)
- Engineer Companies 5/1 and 5/2 (Compagnie de Sapeurs-Mineurs 5/1 & 5/2, CSM 5/1 & 5/2)
- Telegraph Company 5/81 (Compagnie Télégraphique 5/81)
- Radio Company 5/82 (Compagnie Radiotélégraphique 5/82)
- Motorized Headquarters Transport Company 205/3 (Compagnie Automobile de QG 205/3)
- Motorized Transport Company 305/3 (Compagnie Automobile de Transport 305/3)
- Divisional Quartermaster Group 5/3 (Groupe d'Exploitation Divisionnaire 5/3)
- Divisional Medical Group 5 (Groupe Sanitaire Divisionnaire 5)

=== Battle Of France ===
During the Battle of France the division was set to defend the Western side of the Meuse, however with the rapid advancement of German units, the French Army could only form a thin defense line. While the 5th Motorized Division were able to get into their positions, to the South the 18th Infantry Division (France) had only got six of its battalions into positions, and so on 13 May the 5th Motorized was sent to reinforce the 18th Division.

The division was an active division which had existed during peacetime. It was a fully motorized Infantry Division.
