= List of Saint-Cyr promotions =

Beginning in 1829, every class (promotion) of the École spéciale militaire de Saint-Cyr has chosen a name by which it is known. It can be a nickname, the anniversary of a famous battle, a current event, or the name of a famous soldier or general.

== Naming ==
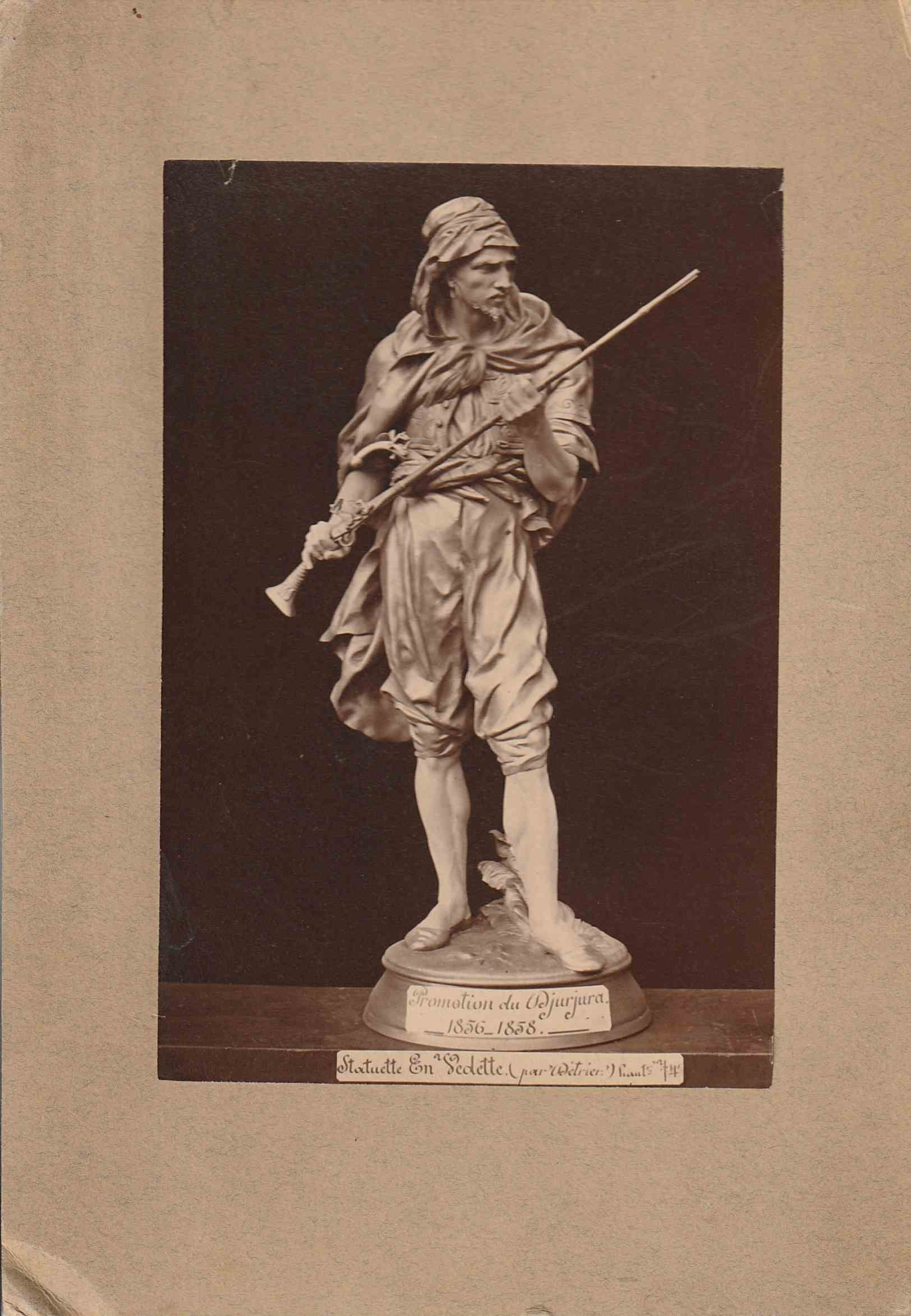
Statuette of the promotion of Djurjura (1856–1858)

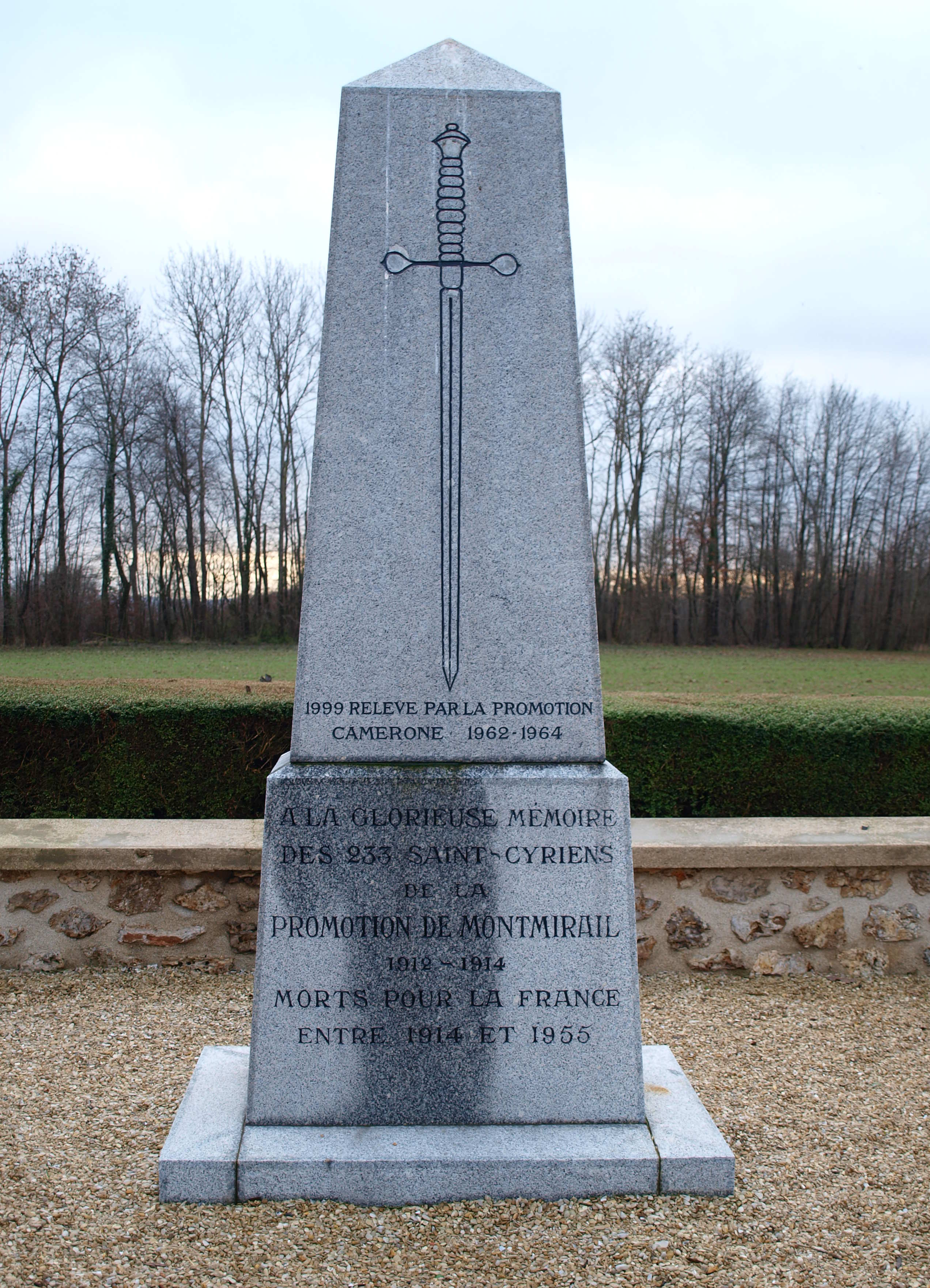
Memorial to the Saint-Cyriens of the Montmirail promotion (1912–1914)

Beginning in 1829, every class (promotion) of the École spéciale militaire de Saint-Cyr has chosen a name. It can be a nickname (du Firmament, "of the Stars", for the first one); the anniversary of a famous battle, like the Centenaire de Camerone for the 1962–1964 class; a current event, like Sevastopol for the 1855–1856 class; or the name of a famous soldier or general like Bayard for 1923–1925 class or Général Louis Charles Antoine Desaix for the 2024–2027 class. Often this commemorates the recent death of a notable Saint-Cyrian like Maréchal Juin (promotion de Fès, 1909–1912) who died in 1967 and whose name was adopted by the 1966–1968 class, or Général Leclerc (promotion de Metz et Strasbourg, 1922–1924), who died in 1947 and whose name was adopted by the 1946–1948 class. Generally, when a class is named after a person, that person is dead. Only two classes were named after a living person: Jean-Baptiste Marchand (1898–1900) and Philippe Pétain (1940–1942).

From the mid 19th-century there was a trend for classes to take names inspired by the French colonies. During this time the Troupes de marine and Troupes coloniales were seen as more prestigious than the metropolitan army and graduating cadets often chose to serve in these branches (previously these branches had been unpopular and often took the lowest ranked cadets of each year). Half of all class names between the 1870s and the start of the First World War had colonial roots.

Since 1982, schooling lasts for three years, and the name of the promotion is chosen at the end of the first year (3rd Battalion), before entry into the second year (2nd Battalion). The battalion proposes several names to the Chief of Staff of the French Army, who makes the selection, but the battalion commander, a regular officer, is often influential in providing advice, opinions, ideas, or proposals. The symbology section of the Defence Historical Service (SHD) in Vincennes is also consulted on the choice of name. The process is not foolproof; in 2018 the army had to reverse itself over naming the 2016–2019 class after General Georges Loustaunau-Lacau, a hero of the Second World War, but also a notorious antisemite, after a public outcry. The SHD had raised concerns over the selection of this name for a class but had been overruled. The process has now been reformed so that the SHD carries out in depth research into the namesakes proposed.

== Wartime classes ==
Saint-Cyr closed on 2 August 1914 due to the outbreak of World War I. In April 1915, it became the Centre d’Instruction d’Élèves Aspirants (CIEA) (Training Center for Officer Cadets), which was closed in November 1918. The CIEA trained four wartime classes: des Drapeaux et de l'Amitié Américaine (1916–1917), de Sainte Odile (1917–1918), La Fayette (1917–1918) and Victoire (1918–1920). In June 1940, with the German Army bearing down on Paris, the school left its original site at the Saint-Cyr-l'École and never returned. From November 1940 to November 1942, the school was located in Aix-en-Provence alongside the École Militaire d’Infanterie (Infantry School), and two promotions came from there: Charles de Foucauld (1941–1942) and Maréchal Pétain (1940–1942).

Meanwhile, Général de brigade Charles de Gaulle (promotion de Fès, 1909–1912) created the Military School of Cadets of Free France in the autumn of 1940. Initially located at Rake Manor, near Milford, Surrey, it subsequently moved to Malvern, Worcestershire, and then to Ribbesford Castle, where it was dissolved on 15 June 1944. Under Law No. 54-292 of 18 March 1954, former students who have passed the exit examinations are considered, in all respects, to have graduated from Saint-Cyr. The school produced five promotions: Liberation (June 1942), Bir Hakeim (December 1942), Fezzan-Tunisia (June 1943), Corsica and Savoy (December 1943) and 18 June (June 1944).

Saint-Cyr was dissolved when the Germans invaded the zone libre in November 1942 and re-created in Algeria on 15 December 1942, as the École d’Élèves Aspirants de Cherchell (Cherchell School of Officer Cadets), which was renamed the École Militaire Interarmes (Joint Military School) on 13 December 1944. Three promotions came from there: Croix de Provence (1942), Veille au Drapeau (1943) and Rome et Strasbourg (1944).

After the war French Army officers of the Maréchal Pétain promotion raised concerns over their namesake, the collaborationist Philippe Pétain, but were advised by Charles de Gaulle that the naming was a historic moment in the life of a cadet and should not be altered thereafter.

== Promotions ==
Class number	Date	Class name	Namesake	Ref
212	2025–2028	Général Jacques Lefort	Jacques Lefort	
211	2024–2027	Général Louis Charles Antoine Desaix	Louis Desaix	
210	2023–2026	Capitaine Henry Desserteaux	After the officer that commanded the defence of Fort de la Redoute Ruinée against the 1940 Italian invasion of France	
209	2022–2025	Capitaine Robert Goupil	Robert Goupil	
208	2021–2024	Colonel Le Cocq	Charles Le Cocq	
207	2020–2023	Général Robert Caillaud	Robert Caillaud	
206	2019–2022	Capitaine Maurice Anjot	Maurice Anjot	
205	2018–2021	Compagnons de la Libération	Companions of Liberation. Hubert Germain, the last surviving companion, died on 12 October 2021.	
204	2017–2020	Général Fourcade	Louis Fourcade	
203	2016–2019	– (Note: Formerly known as Général Georges Loustaunau-Lacau)	None	
202	2015–2018	Général Saint-Hillier	Bernard Saint-Hillier	
201	2014–2017	Chef d'escadrons de Neuchèze	Robert de Neuchèze	
200	2013–2016	Capitaine Hervouët	Yves Hervouët	
199	2012–2015	Lieutenants Thomazo	Jean-Robert Thomazo	
198	2011–2014	Général et sous-lieutenant de Castelnau	Noël Édouard, vicomte de Curières de Castelnau	
197	2010–2013	Chef de bataillon Bulle	Jean Bulle	
196	2009–2012	Capitaine de Cacqueray	De Cacqueray Family	
195	2008–2011	Chef d'escadrons Francoville	Pierre Francoville	
194	2007–2010	Lieutenant Carrelet de Loisy	Jean Carrelet de Loisy	
193	2006–2009	Chef de battalion Segrétain	Pierre Segrétain	
192	2005–2008	Capitaine Beaumont	Serge Beaumont	
191	2004–2007	Lieutenant Brunbrouck	Paul Brunbrouck	
190	2003–2006	Général Simon	Jean Simon (general)	
189	2002–2005	Général de Galbert	Gabriel de Galbert	
188	2001–2004	Général Vanbremeersch	Claude Vanbremeersch	
187	2000–2003	Général Béthouart	Antoine Béthouart	
186	1999–2002	du Bicentenaire de Saint-Cyr	200th anniversary of Saint-Cyr	
185	1998–2001	Chef d'escadrons Raffalli	Rémy Raffalli	
184	1997–2000	France combattante	Fighting France	
183	1996–1999	Général Lalande	André Lalande	
182	1995–1998	Colonel Cazeilles	Colonel Cazeilles	
181	1994–1997	Commandant Morin	Jacques Morin	
180	1993–1996	Maréchal Lannes	Jean Lannes	
179	1992–1995	Capitaine Stéphane	Étienne Poitau	
178	1991–1994	Chef de bataillon de Cointet	Édouard de Cointet	
177	1990–1993	Général Guillaume	Augustin Guillaume	
176	1989–1992	Capitaine Hamacek	Georges Hamacek	
175	1988–1991	Général Delestraint	Charles Delestraint	
174	1987–1990	Lieutenant Tom Morel	Tom Morel	
173	1986–1989	Général Jean Callies	Jean Callies	
172	1985–1988	Cadets de la France libre	"Cadets of Free France	
171	1984–1987	Général Monclar	Raoul Magrin-Vernerey	
170	1983–1986	Lieutenant-colonel Gaucher	Jules Gaucher	
169	1982–1985	Général de Monsabert	Joseph de Goislard de Monsabert	
168	1981–1983	Grande Armée	Grande Armée of the First French Empire	
167	1980–1982	Montcalm	Louis-Joseph de Montcalm	
166	1979–1981	Général Lasalle	Antoine Charles Louis de Lasalle	
165	1978–1980	Général Rollet	Paul-Frédéric Rollet	
164	1977–1979	Maréchal Davout	Louis Nicolas Davout	
163	1976–1978	Capitaine de Cathelineau	Gérard de Cathelineau	
162	1975–1977	Capitaine Henri Guilleminot	Henri Guilleminot	
161	1974–1976	Lieutenant Darthenay	Élisée Alban Darthenay	
160	1973–1975	Maréchal de Turenne	Henri de La Tour d'Auvergne, Viscount of Turenne	
159	1972–1974	de Linares	François de Linares	
158	1971–1973	Capitaine Danjou	Jean Danjou	
157	1970–1972	Général de Gaulle	Charles de Gaulle	
156	1969–1971	Général Gilles	Jean Gilles	
155	1968–1970	Souvenir de Napoléon	Napoleon	
154	1967–1969	Brunet de Sairigné	Gabriel Brunet de Sairigné	
153	1966–1968	Maréchal Juin	Alphonse Juin, who died on 27 January 1967.	
152	1965–1967	Lieutenant-colonel Driant	Emile Driant	
151	1964–1966	Corse et Provence	The French regions of Corsica and Provence	
150	1963–1965	Serment de 14	On the 50th anniversary of an oath made by poet Jean Allard-Méeus upon leaving Saint-Cyr for the Western Front	
149	1962–1964	Centenaire de Camerone	100th anniversary of the Battle of Camerone	
148	1961–1963	Bir Hakeim	20th anniversary of the Battle of Bir Hakeim	
147	1960–1962	Vercors	The 1944 Battle of Vercors	
146	1959–1961	Lieutenant-colonel Jeanpierre	Pierre Jeanpierre	
145	1958–1960	Maréchal Bugeaud	Thomas-Robert Bugeaud	
144	1957–1959	Terre d'Afrique	The land of Africa	
143	1956–1958	Général Laperrine	François-Henry Laperrine	
142	1955–1957	Franchet d'Espèrey	Louis Franchet d'Espèrey	
141	1954–1956	Lieutenant-colonel Amilakvari	Dimitri Amilakhvari	
140	1953–1955	Ceux de Diên Biên Phu	"Dien Bien Phu Pass" which featured in the 1954 Battle of Dien Bien Phu	
139	1952–1954	Union française	French Union	
138	1951–1953	Maréchal de Lattre	Jean de Lattre de Tassigny	
137	1950–1952	Extrême-Orient	The "Far-East" where France was engaged in the First Indochina War	
136	1949–1951	Garigliano	After the Garigliano river in Italy which French forces crossed during the 1944 Operation Diadem	
135	1948–1950	Général Frère	Aubert Frère	
134	1947–1949	Rhin et Danube	"Rhine and Danube", the motto of the French First Army	
133	1946–1948	Général Leclerc	Philippe Leclerc de Hauteclocque	
132	1945–1947	Nouveau Bahut	"New sideboard", the nickname of the school's new campus in Coëtquidan (the Saint-Cyr campus was known as the "old sideboard"	
131	1944	Rome et Strasbourg (Note: Cherchell promotion.)	After the Liberation of Rome and the Liberation of Strasbourg that took place this year	
130	1943	Veille au Drapeau	"Vigil to the Flag"	
129*	June 1944 (Note: The Military School of Cadets of Free France promotion.)	18 Juin	Appeal of 18 June	
129*	December 1943	Corse et Savoie	"Corsica and Savoy" for the Liberation of Corsica and the role played by Italian King Victor Emmanuel III of the House of Savoy in the dismissal of Benito Mussolini and the signing of the Armistice of Cassibile	
129*	June 1943	Fezzan-Tunisie	Fezzan-Ghadames Military Territory and the Tunisian campaign	
129*	December 1942	Bir Hakeim	Battle of Bir Hakeim	
129*	June 1942	Libération	In anticipation of the liberation of France	
129	1942	Croix de Provence	Cross of Provence	
128	1941–1942	Charles de Foucauld (Note: Aix-en-Provence promotion.)	Charles de Foucauld	
127	1940–1942	Maréchal Pétain	After Philippe Pétain the leader of the Vichy France rump state established following German victory in the Battle of France. The class was called up in December 1940 and studied at a site in Aix-en-Provence as Saint-Cyr lay within the German-occupied zone on northern and western France. This was the first class to include engineer and signals officers, who normally carried out their initial training at the École polytechnique.	
126	1939–1940	Amitié Franco-Britannique	"Franco-British friendship" as epitomised by the Entente cordiale. This class was subject to an accelerated 6-month program because of the Second World War and graduated on 12 March 1940.	
125	1938–1939	de la Plus Grande France	"Greater France" in recognition of the French colonial empire which was then at its greatest extent and the second largest in the world. The cadets of this class were commissioned after just a year because of the outbreak of the Second World War.	
124	1937–1939	Marne et Verdun	After the First World War battles of the First Marne (1914) and Verdun (1916). This was the last class to include army pilots and the first to allow graduates to choose to serve in the National Gendarmerie. The class members had been recalled from leave in 1938 because of the German annexation of Sudetenland and at Easter 1939 because of the Italian invasion of Albania. They were recalled on 22 August 1939 as a result of the Danzig crisis and called to active service after the French declaration of war on Germany following the 1 September invasion of Poland. This was the last class to complete two years of study at the old school building at St-Cyr (the "old sideboard"), it was damaged during the war and future classes completed their education at the new school in Coëtquidan, Brittany.	
123	1936–1938	du Soldat inconnu	"Unknown solder" after the unidentified soldier of the First World War interred under the Arc de Triomphe in 1920.	
122	1935–1937	du Maréchal Lyautey	After Hubert Lyautey a marshal of France and minister of war who died in 1934 after playing an important role in the French conquest of Morocco. When asked for three suggestions for names the class proposed "Lyautey", "Maréchal Lyautey" or "Lyautey l'Africain" (Lyautey the African).	
121	1934–1936	du Roi Alexandre 1^{er} de Yougoslavie	"King Alexander I of Yugoslavia" who was assassinated in Marseille on 9 October 1934 during a state visit to France. In 1935 a Yugoslav government delegation visited the academy to mark the assassination. A detachment of Serbian cadets presented each French cadet with a badge in memory of Alexander I. This received retrospective approval by the ministry of war and is now regarded as the first class insignia.	
120	1933–1935	du Roi Albert 1^{er}	"King Albert I", ruler of Belgium who died on 17 February 1934.	
119	1932–1934	de Bournazel	After Captain Henri de Bournazel, a French cavalry officer who was killed in action on 28 February 1933 during the final stages of the French conquest of Morocco.	
118	1931-1933	du Tafilalet	After the French name for the Tafilalt region of Morocco, one of the last regions of the territory to be pacified. A French governor was appointed for the region in January 1932.	
117	1930–1932	Joffre	After Joseph Joffre, commander-in-chief of French forces on the Western Front 1914–16	
116	1929–1931	Mangin	After Charles Mangin, a colonial and First World War French general who had died in 1925. The name had previously been chosen for the 111th class (1924–26) but had been vetoed on that occasion by the Minister of War Paul Painlevé.	
115	1928–1930	Maréchal Foch	"Marshal Foch" after the French general who was appointed Supreme Allied Commander in May 1918.	
114	1927–1929	Maréchal Galliéni	"Marshal Gallieni" after the French general and military governor of Paris during the 1914 Battle of the Marne. Gallieni died in 1916 and was posthumously made a marshal of France in 1921.	
113	1926–1928	du Sous-Lieutenant Pol Lapeyre	"Second Lieutenant Pol Lapeyre", after the French army officer and Saint-Cyr graduate who was besieged at Beni Derkoul during the Rif War. On 15 June 1925 after 61 days under siege, and with the post about to fall into enemy hands, he detonated the magazine killing himself but preventing the ammunition from being captured.	
112	1925–1927	du Maroc et Syrie	"Morocco and Syria" in recognition of progress made by French forces in the pacification of Morocco and the suppression of the Great Syrian Revolt.	
111	1924–1926	du Rif	The class was originally to have been named after General Charles Mangin who died in May 1925. Mangin's support for the establishment of a Rhenish Republic in French-occupied Germany was opposed by the Minister of War Paul Painlevé who vetoed the name. General Albert Tanant formally named the class du Rif in June 1925. This name was chosen to reflect the Rif War in Spanish Morocco, in which France intervened earlier that year. The choice was controversial as the war was going badly at the time and the class did not want to carry the name of a defeat.	
110	1923–1925	du Chevalier Bayard	"Knight Bayard" to mark the 400th anniversary of the death of the French knight Pierre Terrail, seigneur de Bayard at the 1524 Battle of the Sesia.	
109	1922–1924	de Metz et Strasbourg	After the two principal cities of Alsace-Lorraine which was restored to France at the end of the First World War.	
108	1921–1923	du Souvenir	"Remembrance" in recognition of the unveiling on 20 May 1921 of a memorial listing the 4,865 school graduates killed during the First World War. As a mark of honour the President of France Alexandre Millerand also awarded the school the Croix de Guerre, which was borne on its flag cravat (a piece of fabric hung from the finial).	
107	1920–1922	de la Devise du Drapeau	"The flag motto" in recognition of the motto Ils s’instruisent pour vaincre ("They study to vanquish") that was added to the school flag on 3 December 1921. This motto had been used by the school during the First French Empire.	
106	1920–1921	de la Dernière de la Grande Guerre	"The last of the Great War" as this class was the last to admit veterans of the First World War alongside the usual entrants taken direct from school.	
105	1919–1921	de la Garde au Rhin	"The Guard on the Rhine" in recognition of the restoration of Alsace, whose border with Germany was the Rhine river, to France. The class, which included 104 new entrants as well as the 41 remaining from the 104th class, had requested to be named after General Édouard de Castelnau, an army group commander during the First World War. Castelnau declined the honour and suggested the class name themselves after the new border.	
104	1919–1920	des Croix de Guerre 1914–1918	"The Crosses of War" after the Croix de Guerre medal that was held by almost all of those in this class. Many officers who joined during the First World War had no opportunity to take the school entrance exams when classes resumed in 1916. Instead at the war's end some 1,000 veterans with temporary commissions attended a four-month course at the army's non-commissioned officer school. Afterwards 291 were admitted to Saint-Cyr; the 250 who had held temporary officer commissions graduated 8 July 1920 while the remainder, former NCOs, graduated in the 105th class in 1921.	
103	1918–1920	Victoire	"Victory" in honour of the allied victory in the First World War	
102	1917–1918	La Fayette	"La Fayette" after the French name of Gilbert du Motier, Marquis de Lafayette, a French officer who fought in the American War of Independence and the French Revolution. The class selected the name as they graduated in July 1918 and Lafayette was famous for his role in the 1830 July Revolution.	
101	1917–1918	de Sainte Odile	"Saint Odile", in honour of the patron saint of Alsace, which it was hoped to reclaim during the First World War. This class was admitted to the school simultaneously with that of the 102nd class but had received around 4 months prior instruction by veteran officers and non-commissioned officers at regimental depots. They were split into separate platoons at the school and the 101st class graduated early, on 20 February 1918.	
100	1916–1917	des drapeaux et de l'amitié Américaine	"Flags and American friendship". This class was the first to graduate during the war. It participated in the 14 July 1917 parade in Paris to mark the American entry into the war. The school flag was carried by this class at the parade and the class desired to take this name. The school authorities preferred a name that related to the United States to mark financial contributions made by American citizens to the families of St Cyr graduates killed during the war. A combined name was assigned but, feeling that it had been imposed upon them the class opted to be known unofficially as the Centième (the "hundreth") after their class number.	
99	1914	de la Grande Revanche	"The great revenge" after the revanchist movement in France that sought to restore the province of Alsace-Lorraine, lost after the Franco-Prussian War of 1870–71. This class did not formally enter the academy, having only sat their entry examination and being partway through the entry interviews when the First World War broke out in July 1914. The cadets were instead sent to regimental depots immediately where they received intensive instruction, before being appointed as second lieutenants in December 1914; though some managed to arrange earlier postings. Lacking the usual naming ceremony this class was formally named by Général de Division Louis de Garnier des Garets, president of the academy, in January 1915. The survivors of this class returned to the academy after the war to complete their course, alongside the 98th class.	
98	1913–1914	de la Croix du Drapeau	"The cross of the flag" to mark the 1914 award of the legion of honour to the academy. The academy incorporated a representation of the award's cross on the cravat (a piece of fabric hung from the finial) of its flag. This class graduated early (after just ten months instructed) to be commissioned as second lieutenants due to the outbreak of the First World War. The class returned after the war to formally complete their training at the academy,	
97	1912–1914	de Montmirail	"Montmirail" to mark the 1814 battle where Napoleon defeated Russian and Prussian force. In 1913 the army's policy changed such that the year cadets served with the regiments would now be carried out as a "sandwich" year between two years at the academy (rather than comprising the first year of training). This class graduated in 1914, after two years training, as part of a transition into the new system.	
96	1911–1914	des Marie-Louise	"Marie-Louise" after the nickname for the conscripts of 1814–15, who were raised under the authority of Marie Louise, Empress of France. These troops were used to supplement the veterans of the Grande Armée in Napoleon's later campaigns.	
95	1910–1913	de la Moskova	"The Moskva", the French name for the Battle of Borodino where Napoleon defeated the Russians on 7 September 1812	
94	1909–1912	de Fès	"Fez", which was then the capital of Morocco. In 1911 French troops arrived in the city to relieve Sultan Abd al-Hafid who had been besieged by rebels. This marked the start of direct French intervention in the territory and triggered the Agadir Crisis, a dispute with Germany.	
93	1908–1911	de Mauritanie	"Mauritania" to mark the arrival of French forces under Henri Gouraud at Atar in 1909 as part of a campaign to pacify the colony.	
92	1907–1910	du Maroc	"Morocco" to mark the commencement of the French conquest of that territory in 1907.	
91	1906–1909	du Centenaire de l’Ecole	"The centenary of the school" to mark the 100th anniversary of the relocation of the academy from Fontainebleau to Saint-Cyr-l'École in July 1808.	
90 bis (additional)	1906–1908	des Cinq	"The five". A change of policy was implemented on 21 March 1905 which required officer candidates to serve one year in the army before joining the academy. The first year was considered their initial class year so subsequently all classes became three years long rather than two. In the class of 1906 five candidates had already served and so were permitted to join the academy as a special case. They completed their studies alongside 90th and 91st classes and were commissioned as second lieutenants in 1908 (the only officers to graduate from the school in that year). The 1912 academy yearbook defines the five as a separate class but subsequent directories list them as part of the 91st class. The Saint Cyrienne historical association refers to it as the 90th bis (additional) class.	
90	1905–1907	la Dernière du Vieux Bahut	"The last of the old chest". From 21 March 1905 it was decreed that officer candidates must spend a year in the ranks before joining the academy. In compensation graduates were required to spend one less year in the rank of second lieutenant before being promoted. The class of 1905–1907 were the last to follow the old system and took this name in recognition. Subsequent classes were considered to be of three years duration (counting the year spent with the army), rather than two years as previous.	
89	1904–1906	du Centenaire d'Austerlitz	"The centenary of Austerlitz" after the 1805 battle in which Napoleon defeated a combined Russian and Austrian force.	
88	1903–1905	de La Tour-d'Auvergne	"La Tour d'Auvergne" after Théophile Corret de la Tour d'Auvergne (1743–1800), a French army officer that was honoured by Napoleon Bonaparte	
87	1902–1904	du Sud-Oranais	"South Oran" after an area of Algeria occupied by General Hubert Lyautey from 1903 to put down revolts against French rule (including the September 1903 Battle of El-Moungar).	
86	1901–1903	du centenaire de la Légion d'honneur	"Centenary of the Legion of Honour" which had been founded in 1802 by Napoleon Bonaparte.	
85	1900–1902	du Tchad	"Chad" to commemorate the incorporation of that territory as a French colony in 1900. This followed the defeat of Rabih az-Zubayr by Amédée-François Lamy at the Battle of Kousséri, during which both men were killed.	
84	1899–1901	d'In Salah	"In Salah" after an oasis in Algeria captured by French forces in 1900. The class had originally proposed the name "Villebois-Mareuil" after George Henri Anne-Marie Victor de Villebois-Mareuil, a French colonel who fought and died on the side of the Boers during the 1899–1902 war against the British. This proposal was refused on diplomatic grounds.	
83	1898-1900	Marchand	"Marchand" after Jean-Baptiste Marchand who commanded French forces in the 1898 Fashoda Incident, a confrontation with British forces in Eastern Africa.	
82	1897–1899	de Bourbaki	"Bourbaki" after Charles-Denis Bourbaki, a French general who died in 1897. He commanded Napoleon III's Imperial Guard during the Franco-Prussian War. He later commanded the Armée de l'Est and Armée du Nord and defeated the Prussians at the 1871 Battle of Villersexel.	
81	1896–1898	la Première des Grandes Manœuvres	"The first of the grand manoeuvres" after the 1897 military exercise, which was the first large-scale war game for the French army. The class had originally requested to be named d'Aumale after Henri d'Orléans, Duke of Aumale, the victor of the Battle of the Smala who died in 1897. This request was denied by the government of the French Third Republic who did not wish to honour a son of the last king of France.	
80	1895–1897	de Tananarive	"Antananarivo" the capital of the Kingdom of Madagascar that was captured by the French under General Jacques Duchesne on 30 September 1895.	
79	1894–1896	d'Alexandre III	"Alexander III" after the Russian Tsar who died in 1894 and was responsible for concluding the Franco-Russian Alliance.	
78	1893–1895	de Jeanne d'Arc	"Joan of Arc" after the French heroine of the Hundred Years' War who had become popular at this time.	
77	1892–1894	du Siam	"Siam" after the 1893 Franco-Siamese War, which resulted in a French victory and creation of the protectorate of Laos	
76	1891–1893	du Soudan	"Sudan" in honour of the pacification of French Sudan (modern-day Mali) that had begun under General Louis Faidherbe and been completed under General Joseph Gallieni	
75	1890–1892	de Cronstadt	"Kronstadt" after the Russian Baltic Sea port visited by a French fleet in 1891 to exchange letters of agreement that formed the basis of the Franco-Russian Alliance.	
74	1889-1891	du Dahomey	"Dahomey" after the First Franco-Dahomean War, an 1890 French victory.	
73	1888–1890	du Grand Triomphe	The "great triumph" after the name of the traditional ceremony in which cadets graduate from the academy. Traditionally a barrel was set up in the courtyard and shot with a mortar. This practice had been banned in 1884 but was reinstated as an annual event in 1888, with a formal party and games attended by civilians	
72	1887–1889	de Tombouctou	"Timbuktu" after the city in Western Sudan. The region was subject to an 1888 offensive led by Louis Archinard against Ahmadu Tall's Toucouleur Empire and Samori Ture's Wassoulou Empire.	
71	1886–1888	de Châlons	"Châlons" as the class was the first to receive musketry training at the Camp de Châlons rather than in Fontainebleau.	
70	1885–1887	de l'Annam	"Annam" after the French protectorate which was recognised by China in the 1885 Treaty of Tientsin that ended the Sino-French War.	
69	1884–1886	de Foutchéou	"Fuzhou" after the 1884 battle of the Sino-French War in which Admiral Amédée Courbet destroyed a Chinese fleet and the Foochow Arsenal.	
68	1883–1885	de Madagascar	"Madagascar" after the French expedition of 1883 which bombarded and occupied the town of Tamatave.	
67	1882–1884	des Pavillons Noirs	"Black flags" after the Black Flag Army of Chinese bandits which fought French forces under Admiral Amédée Courbet in Tonkin from 1883. The conflict escalated into the Sino-French War of 1884–85	
66	1881–1883	d'Égypte	"Egypt" to mark the loss of French influence over the country. The 1879 'Urabi revolt against Anglo-French interests led to the Anglo–Egyptian War which established British control	
65	1880–1882	des Kroumirs	"Kroumirs" after the tribe whose raids on Algeria gave France a pretext to intervene in Tunisia and impose a protectorate in the 1881 Treaty of Bardo	
64	1879–1881	des Drapeaux	"Flags" in honour of the bestowing of new flags upon French Army units on Bastille Day 1880 by President Jules Grévy. The academy received on this date its tenth flag, It's traditional motto "they educate themselves to conquer", which dated to the Napoleonic era, was also replaced with "honour and fatherland" (honneur et patrie). The new motto was that used by other institutions of the French Army and by the Legion of Honour.	
63	1878–1880	des Zoulous	"Zulus" after the tribe involved in the 1879 Anglo-Zulu War and which killed Napoléon, Prince Imperial	
62	1877–1879	de Novi Bazar	"Novi Pazar" after the region of the Balkans which Austro-Hungarian troops occupied as part of their 1878 campaign to establish a condominium over Bosnia and Herzegovina.	
61	1876–1878	de Plewna	"Plevna" after the 1877 Siege of Plevna in which an Ottoman force defended the city against a combined Russian-Romanian-Bulgarian army for five months before surrendering.	
60	1875–1877	Dernière de Wagram	"Last of the Wagram"; the expansion of the academy required Wagram Court (named for the 1809 Battle of Wagram) to be infilled with new buildings. This class was the last to be able to use it.	
59	1874–1876	la Grande Promotion	"The great class" in recognition of the recent expansion of the academy which had seen the number of cadets in each class rise from 250 to 400.	
58	1873–1875	de l'Archiduc Albert	"Archduke Albrecht", for the Duke of Teschen who led the Austrian forces to victory over the Italians at the 1866 Battle of Custoza. He was popular in France for fighting in the Austro-Prussian War and visited the academy in 1870.	
57	1872–1874	du Shah	"Shah" after Naser al-Din Shah Qajar, the ruler of Persia, who aligned his country with France and who visited Paris during his historic travels in Europe in 1873.	
56	1872–1873	d'Alsace-Lorraine	"Alsace-Lorraine" after the territories lost to Germany as a result of the Franco-Prussian War.	
55	1870–1872	de la Revanche	"Revenge", a term which found frequent use by the revanchist movement of the time who wished to avenge the French defeat in the Franco-Prussian war and reclaim the lost territories of Alsace-Lorraine. This class was said to have been named during a meal at the academy where the guest of honour Ernest Courtot de Cissey (Minister of War 1871–73) led a toast to the student officers: "to the class of revenge".	
54	1869–1871	du 14 août 1870	The class was originally to have been named du Rhin (The Rhine), after a key French objective at the start of the Franco-Prussian War. However, after the French defeat the class chose the name "14 August 1870" to commemorate the date they were appointed as second lieutenants and posted to the French Army. The class returned after the war to complete their education at the academy.	
53	1868–1870	de Suez	"Suez" for the canal connecting the Mediterranean to the Red Sea which was inaugurated by Empress Eugénie on 17 November 1869.	
52	1867–1869	de Mentana	"Mentana" after the 1867 battle in which a French-Papal States force, led by Pierre Louis Charles de Failly (who graduated in the 9th St Cyr class), prevented the Italians under Giuseppe Garibaldi from marching on Rome.	
51	1866–1868	du Sultan	"Sultan" after the Ottoman ruler Abdülaziz who visited Paris for the Exposition Universelle in 1867.	
50	1865–1867	de Vénétie	"Veneto", the region around Venice. In commemoration of the ceding of the territory to France in the 1866 Treaty of Vienna which followed the Third Italian War of Independence and the Austro-Prussian War. France immediately gifted the territory to the Kingdom of Italy.	
49	1864–1866	d'Oajaca	"Oajaca" to commemorate the successful capture of the town in Mexico by French forces on 9 February 1865.	
48	1863–1865	du Danemark	"Denmark" after the 1864 Second Schleswig War in which Prussia captured Schleswig, Holstein, and Lauenburg from the Danes.	
47	1862–1864	de Puebla	"Puebla" after the 1863 siege, in which the French under Élie Frédéric Forey captured the Mexican city.	
46	1861–1863	du Mexique	"Mexico" after the Second French intervention in Mexico which began in 1861 and established the Second Mexican Empire.	
45	1860–1862	du Céleste Empire	"The Celestial Empire", a poetic name for China where, in 1860, a Franco-British expedition defeated the Qing Empire during the last phase of the Second Opium War.	
44	1859–1861	de Nice et Savoie	"Nice and Savoy" after the annexation of these two states by France. This was agreed as part of the Treaty of Turin (1860) by Victor Emmanuel II in exchange for Frances support during the Second Italian War of Independence.	
43	1858–1860	de Solferino	"Solferino" after the 1859 battle, a Franco-Sardinian victory over the Austrians in modern-day Italy.	
42	1857–1859	de l'Indoustan	"Hindustan" a synonym for India, after the events of the Indian Rebellion of 1857.	
41	1856–1858	de Djurdjura	"Djurdjura" after the region of North Africa where the French under Jacques Louis Randon defeated Lalla Fatma N'Soumer which marked the end of the conquest of Algeria.	
40	1855–1857	de Prince Impérial	"Prince Imperial" in honour of Napoléon, Prince Imperial who was born on 15 March 1856.	
39	1854–1856	de Sébastopol	"Sevastopol" after the allied victory in the Siege of Sevastopol (1854–1855). This class was admitted to the academy early (from December 1854) to provide officers for the ongoing Crimean War and graduated simultaneously with those remaining from the 38th class.	
38	1854–1856	de Crimée	"Crimea" after the location of the Crimean War in which France fought from 1853 to 1856. Part of this class left early to join the French Army in the field in January 1855	
37	1853–1855	de Turquie	"Turkey" after part of the Ottoman Empire with whom France was allied in the Crimean War (1853–56)	
36	1852–1854	de l'Empire	"The Empire" in honour of the establishment of the Second French Empire in 1852.	
35	1851–1853	de l'Aigle	"The Eagle" in honour a new flag delivered to the academy depicting the French Imperial Eagle of the Second French Empire (established 1852), replacing the Gallic rooster of the July Monarchy.	
34	1850–1852	de Kabylie	"Kabylie" after a region of Algeria pacified by General Jacques Leroy de Saint-Arnaud.	
33	1849–1851	de Zaatcha	"Zaatcha" after the French victory over Algerian tribesmen at the Siege of Zaatcha in 1849.	
32	1848–1850	de Hongrie	"Hungary" after the Hungarian Revolution of 1848.	
31	1847–1849	de la République	"The Republic" after the French Second Republic which was declared following the French Revolution of 1848	
30	1846–1848	d'Italie	"Italy" after the First Italian War of Independence which started in 1848.	
29	1845–1847	d'Ibrahim	"Ibrahim" after Ibrahim Pasha of Egypt in honour of his visit to St Cyr on 22 May 1846. Ibrahim led the Egyptian forces to victory in the Egyptian–Ottoman War (1831–1833) and was only prevented from capturing Istanbul by the intervention of the great powers. The class was originally to be named for Poland but this was changed after the February 1846 Kraków uprising. It is still sometimes known as the Promotion d’Ibrahim, ou de Pologne – the "Class of Ibrahim, or of Poland".	
28	1844–1846	de Djemmah	"Djemmah" after the town of Djemaa el Ghazaouet in French Algeria (later renamed by the French to Nemours and now known as Ghazaouet). A column from the town, led by Colonel Lucien de Montagnac (a graduate of St Cyr's second class), fought to the death in a last stand at the Battle of Sidi Brahim in 1845.	
27	1843–1845	d'Isly	"Isly" after the 1844 battle in which the French defeated a more numerous Moroccan force.	
26	1842–1844	du Tremblement	"The tremor" after the 1843 Guadeloupe earthquake.	
25	1841–1843	d'Orient	"The East", as the class had been brought forward to provide the additional officers for the expansion of the French Army following the Egyptian–Ottoman War (1839–1841). Class also referred to as the "Winter melons" – following the naming of the 24th class (the "Summer melons") – having joined the academy in October 1841.	
24	1841–1843	de la Nécessité	"The need". Class also referred to as the "Summer melons" (melons was a term traditionally used for first year students at the academy), having been brought to the academy in April 1841 to meet a need for officers for the army which was under rapid expansion due to the Egyptian–Ottoman War (1839–1841)	
23	1840–1842	des Cendres	"The ashes", referring to the 1840 return of the ashes of Napoleon I to Paris from St Helena.	
22	1839–1841	de Mazagran	"Mazagran" after the 1840 battle, a French victory in Algeria.	
21	1838–1840	de l'An Quarante	"The 40th year". An allusion to a popular belief in France at that time that the world would end in 1840.	
20	1837–1839	de Constantine	"Constantine" after the 1837 siege, a victory by the French over Ottoman Algeria.	
19	1836–1838	de l'Obélisque	"The obelisk" after the Luxor Obelisk which was erected in the Place de la Concorde in 1836.	
18	1835–1837	de la Comète	"The Comet" after Halley's Comet which made an appearance in 1835	
17	1834–1836	unnamed	–	
16	1833–1835	unnamed	–	
15	1832–1835	unnamed	–	
14	1831–1833	unnamed	–	
13	1830–1832	du Firmament	"The firmament". Reason unknown but possibly a reference to the cadets being rising stars of the future or to the stars on the baton of a Marshal of France	
12	1829–1831	unnamed	–	
11	1828–1830	unnamed	–	
10	1827–1829	unnamed	–	
9	1826–1828	unnamed	–	
8	1825–1827	unnamed	–	
7	1824–1826	unnamed	–	
6	1823–1825	unnamed	–	
5	1822–1824	unnamed	–	
4	1821–1823	unnamed	–	
3	1820–1822	unnamed	–	
2	1819–1821	unnamed	–	
1	1818–1820	unnamed	This was the first numbered class. Classes, totalling thousands of students, had graduated the academy since its foundation in 1803. However information on the early years is scarce. The academy was dissolved in 1814 after Napoleon's defeat in the War of the Sixth Coalition; it was refounded during Napoleon's return in the Hundred Days (1815) but dissolved once more after his defeat at the Battle of Waterloo. The academy was formally reconstituted by Marshal Laurent de Gouvion Saint-Cyr in 1818 to provide officers for the new army of the Kingdom of France. The numbering of classes started from this point.	
