= Jacques Lécuyer =

French general

Jacques Lécuyer (14 July 1912 – 3 April 1999) was a French general who after 1940 became a senior résistance leader. He received a Rosette of l’Ordre de la Libération on 31 March 1947.
