= Organisation de résistance de l'armée =

French resistance organization during WWII

The Organisation de résistance de l'armée, O.R.A. (Fr: resistance organisation of the army) was a French paramilitary resistance organisation during the Second World War. It was created on 31 January 1943, following the November 1942 German invasion of the zone libre as a self-styled apolitical organisation bringing together former French military personnel in pursuit of active resistance against the German occupiers, but rejecting Charles de Gaulle.

The ORA was founded by General Aubert Frère, president of the tribunal which had condemned de Gaulle to death in August 1940. Frère was arrested in 1943 and deported. He died in Struthof on 13 June 1944. The ORA's next leader was Major General Jean-Edouard Verneau, who was arrested on 23 October 1943 and died while being deported to Buchenwald on 14 September 1944. The leadership was then assumed by Major General Georges Revers, whose second was Brigadier General Pierre Brisac.

The ORA grew quickly in the southern zone, which was not handed over to the Germans, thanks to its officers and armaments acquired from the Vichy army. In 1944, it amalgamated with the Armée secrète (AS) and the Francs-tireurs et partisans to form the French Forces of the Interior, although it retained its autonomy.

== The initial stages of resistance in the army ==
On the day after the defeat and the signature of the armistice in 1940, a certain number of French army officers, reduced to a body of 100,000 men, considered that all was not lost. The forces across the French empire were still intact, and the reconquest of France with the help of the allies remained possible. From July, certain services considered preparing the counterstrike. Colonel Rivet, chief of the 2 Bureau gathered his allies and said to them that the mission against Germany and Italy would continue.

== Notable members ==
- Jacques Boutet
- Marcel Descour
- Aubert Frère (1881- 13.6.1944 / place of death: KZ Natzweiler-Struthof)
- Jacques Lécuyer
- Charles Ailleret
- Joachim Murat, 7th Prince Murat (1920 – 20.7.1944 / place of death: Lingé)
- Louis, Prince Napoléon
- Georges Revers
- Jean-Edouard Verneau (1890 - 14.9.1944 / place of death: KZ Buchenwald)

== See also ==
- Maquis (World War II)
- Military history of France during World War II
- Free France
