= Aubert Frère =

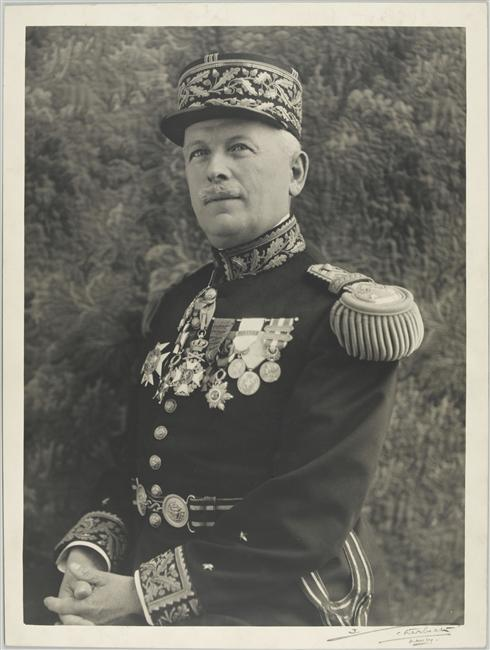

Aubert Frère (1881–1944) was a French general and founder of the French resistance group, the Organisation de résistance de l'armée. He was president of the tribunal which had condemned Charles de Gaulle to death in August 1940. Frère was arrested in 1943 and deported. He died in Struthof on 13 June 1944.
