= 47 mm APX anti-tank gun =

WW2 French anti-tank gun

canon de 47 mm SA mle 1937
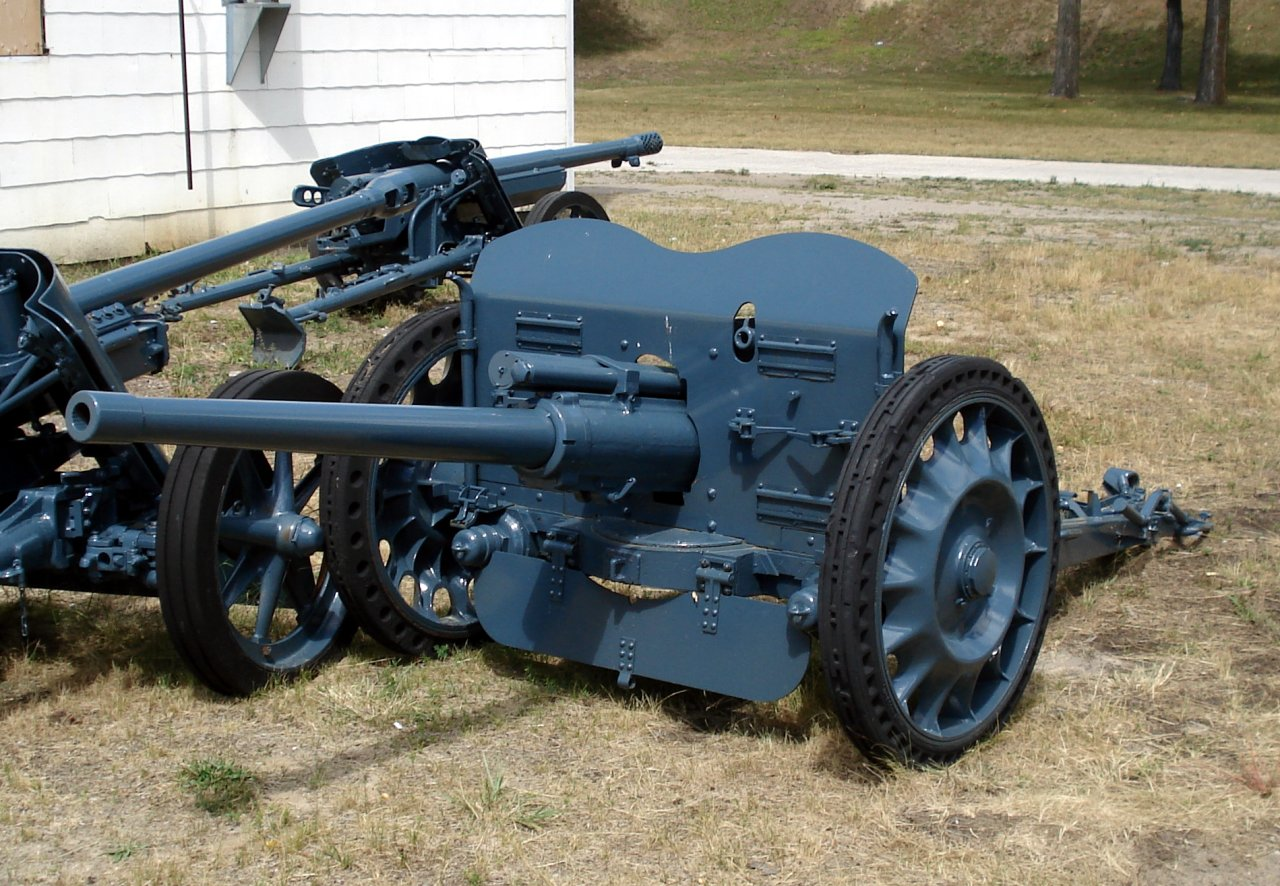
- 47 SA 37 preserved at Base Borden Military Museum at CFB Borden Ontario, Canada
- Type: Anti-tank gun
- Place of origin: France

Service history
- Used by: France; Nazi Germany; Kingdom of Italy
- Wars: World War II

Production history
- Designed: 1936
- Manufacturer: Atelier de Puteaux
- Produced: 1939–1940
- No. built: 1,268

Specifications
- Mass: 1,070 kg (2,359 lbs)
- Length: 4.1 m (13 ft 5 in)
- Barrel length: 2.49 m (8 ft 2 in) L/53
- Width: 1.6 m (5 ft 3 in)
- Height: 1.1 m (3 ft 7 in)
- Crew: 6
- Shell: Fixed QF 47x380 mm. R APCBC
- Shell weight: 1.73 kg (3.74 lbs)
- Caliber: 47 millimetres (1.9 in)
- Carriage: Split-trail
- Elevation: -13° to +16.5°
- Traverse: 68°
- Rate of fire: 15 to 20 rounds/min
- Muzzle velocity: 855 m/s (2,805 ft/s)
- Effective firing range: 2,000 m (2,187 yds)

The 47 mm APX anti-tank gun was a French anti-tank gun that saw service in the first years of the Second World War.

== Development ==
In the 1930s, the French Army sought a replacement for the derivatives of the 75 mm mle 1897 field gun it used as an anti-tank gun. The soixante-quinze was an effective anti-tank gun but was heavy and much harder to conceal than the newer, small, high-velocity, small calibre anti-tank weapons. The chosen weapon was a design of the state-owned arsenal Atelier de Construction de Puteaux workshop (abbreviated to APX) located in Puteaux, Paris, and was named the canon de 47 mm semi-automatique mle 1937. A similar model designated the canon de 47 mm semi-automatique mle 1939 was also produced. Both were efficient weapons, especially given the thin armour of contemporary German tanks. The gun could pierce 60 mm (2.4 in) at 550 meters (600 yd) or 80 mm (3.1 in) at 180 meters (200 yd). Unfortunately for France, the 47mm SA mle 1937 and 47mm SA mle 1939 were still rare weapons at the time of the Battle of France.

== Foreign use ==
Examples captured by the German forces were used under the name 4.7 cm Pak 181(f) for the mle 1937 and 4.7 cm Pak 183(f) for the mle 1939. The guns were used in Atlantic Wall fortifications and armed a number of their Panzerjäger self-propelled tank destroyers.

- 4.7 cm Pak 181(f) oder 183(f) auf PzJäg Lorraine Schlepper (f) - mounted on a French Lorraine 37L tracked artillery tractor chassis
- 4.7 cm Pak(f) auf Panzerspähwagen P204(f) - mounted on a French Panhard 178 armored car chassis
- 4.7 cm Pak(f) auf PzKpfW I - mounted on a Panzer I chassis
- 4.7 cm Pak(f) auf PzKpfW Mk.II 748(e) - mounted on a British Matilda II tank chassis
- 4.7 cm Pak 181(f) oder 183(f) auf PzKpfW 35R(f) - mounted on a captured French Renault R35 infantry tank chassis

== Variants ==
- 47mm SA mle 1939 TAZ - a variant on a tripod, capable of 360° traverse, which did not enter production.
- 47mm SA 35 mle 1935 - an earlier variant, mounted on tanks such as the Somua S35 and the Char B1, used a shortened 47×193 mm R cartridge.

== See also ==
- 25 mm Hotchkiss anti-tank gun
- 47 mm Model 1931 anti-tank gun - a comparable Belgian gun of the same period
- 4,7cm KPÚV vz. 38 - a comparable Czech gun
