= 18th Infantry Division (France) =

The 18th Infantry Division (French: 18e Division d'Infanterie, 18e DI) was a French Army formation during World War I and World War II.

== World War I ==
It commanded the 32nd, 66th and 77th Infantry Regiments for the entirety of the war, as well as the 135th Infantry regiment (until early 1917) and the 71st Territorial Infantry Regiment (from late 1918).

It was part of the French 9th Corps, during which it participated in the First Battle of the Marne, the First Battle of the Aisne, the First Battle of Ypres, the Second Battle of Artois and Third Battle of Artois, the Battle of Verdun, the Battle of the Somme, the Battle of the Lys, the Battle of Matz, the Fourth Battle of Champagne, the Second Battle of the Marne and the Meuse-Argonne Offensive.

At various times, it was part of the French First Army, French Second Army, French Third Army, French Fourth Army, French Fifth Army, French Sixth Army, French Eighth Army, French Ninth Army and French Tenth Army.

== Battle of France, World War II ==
During the Battle of France in May 1940 the division was made up of the following units:

- 66th Infantry Regiment
- 77th Infantry Regiment
- 125th Infantry Regiment
- 30th Reconnaissance Battalion
- 19th Artillery Regiment
- 219th Artillery Regiment

It was a Series A reserve division which contained younger reservists.
