= Panhard 178 =

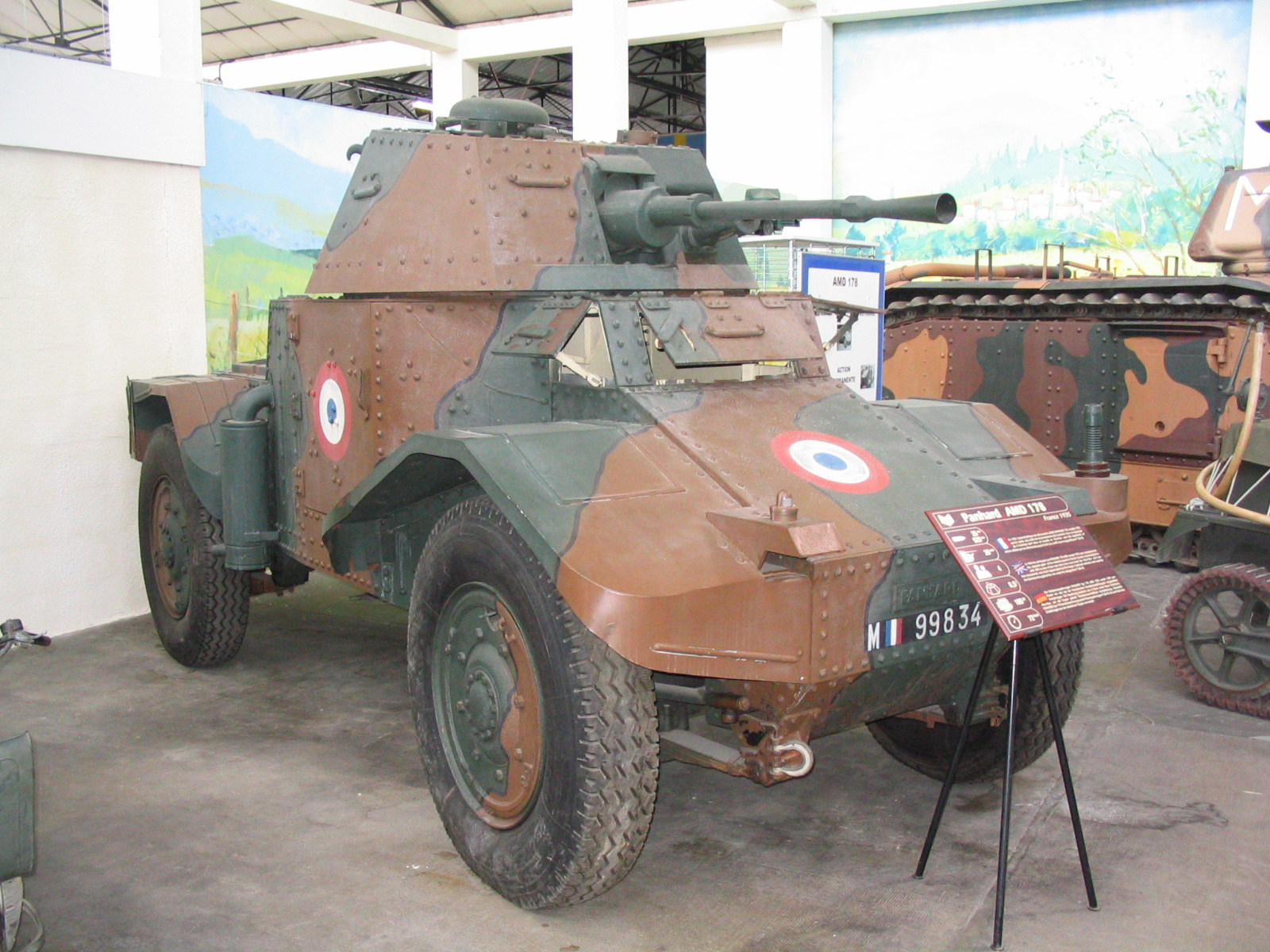
- Preserved AMD Panhard 35 at the Musée des Blindés
- Type: Armoured car
- Place of origin: French Third Republic

Service history
- In service: April 1937–1964
- Used by: France; Nazi Germany (captured); Syria
- Wars: World War II; First Indochina War; Vietnam War

Production history
- Designer: Panhard
- Designed: 1933–1937
- Manufacturer: Panhard
- Unit cost: ₣ 275,000 hull
- Produced: February 1937 — ~October 1940
- No. built: 729 "A" versions, 414 B version
- Variants: Panhard 178B

Specifications
- Mass: 8.2 metric tonnes
- Length: 4.79 m with gun
- Width: 2.01 m
- Height: 2.31 m
- Crew: 4
- Armor: 20 mm
- Main armament: 25 mm SA 35 L/47.2 Cannon
- Secondary armament: 7.5 mm Reibel machine gun
- Engine: Panhard SK; 105 hp
- Suspension: leaf spring
- Ground clearance: 0.35 m
- Operational range: 300 km
- Maximum speed: 72 km/h

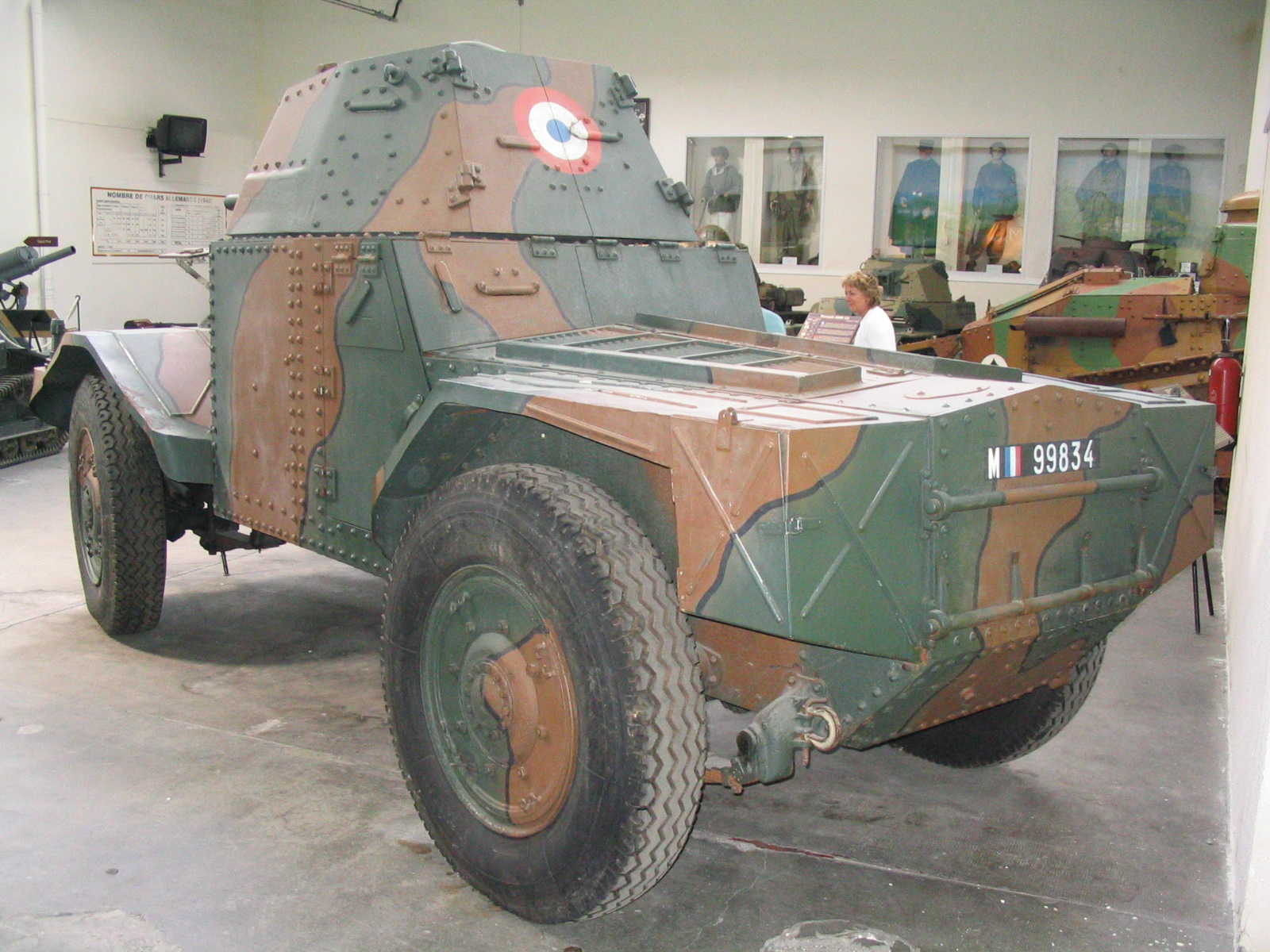
The rear of the same vehicle, showing the position of the second driver; the hull, despite having been repainted with a number belonging to the third production batch, is in fact that of a Panhard 178B. The APX3B turret is of the latest type with a rear episcope

The Panhard 178 (officially designated as Automitrailleuse de Découverte Panhard modèle 1935, 178 being the internal project number at Panhard) or "Pan-Pan" was an advanced French reconnaissance 4x4 armoured car that was designed for the French Army Cavalry units before World War II. It had a crew of four and was equipped with an effective 25 mm main armament and a 7.5 mm coaxial machine gun.

In 1940, a number of these vehicles were taken over by the Germans after the Fall of France and employed as the Panzerspähwagen P204 (f); for some months after the June armistice, production continued for the benefit of Germany. After the war, a derived version, the Panhard 178B, was again taken into production by France.

== Development ==
In December 1931, the French Cavalry conceived a plan for the future production of armoured fighting vehicles. One of the classes foreseen was that of an Automitrailleuse de Découverte or AMD, a specialised long range reconnaissance vehicle. The specifications were formulated on 22 December 1931, changed on 18 November 1932 and approved on 9 December 1932. They called for a weight of 4 metric tons (4.0 t), a range of 400 kilometres (250 mi), a speed of 70 km/h, a cruising speed of 40 km/h, a turning circle of 12 metres (39 ft), 5–8 mm armour, a 20 mm gun and a 7.5 mm machine gun.

In 1933, one of the competing companies — the others being Renault, Berliet and Latil — which had put forward proposals, Panhard, was allowed to build a prototype. The other companies also were ordered to build prototypes: Renault constructed two vehicles of a Renault VZ, including an armoured personnel carrier variant, Berliet constructed a single Berliet VUB and Latil belatedly presented a design in April 1934. The Panhard vehicle was ready in October 1933 and presented to the Commission de Vincennes in January 1934 under the name Panhard voiture spéciale type 178. It carried a Vincennes workshop (Avis) 13.2 mm machine gun turret, as the intended one was not ready yet. After testing between 9 January and 2 February 1934, the type, despite having larger dimensions than prescribed and thus being a lot heavier than four tons, was accepted by the commission on 15 February under the condition that some small modifications were carried out. Of all the competing projects, it was considered the best: the Berliet VUB e.g. was reliable but too heavy and traditional; the Latil version had no all-terrain capacity. In the autumn, the improved prototype, now lacking the bottom tracks of the original type, was tested by the Cavalry. In late 1934, the type was accepted under the name AMD Panhard Modèle 1935. The type was now fitted with the APX3B turret.

After complaints about reliability, such as cracking gun sights, and overheating, between 29 June and 2 December 1937 a new test programme took place, resulting in many modifications, including the fitting of a silencer and a ventilator on the turret. The ultimate design was very advanced for its day and still appeared modern in the 1970s. It was the first 4x4 armoured car mass-produced for a major country.

== Production ==
The old Panhard factory where the AMD 35s were assembled

The final assembly and painting of the armoured cars took place in the Panhard & Levassor factory at the Avenue d'Ivry in the 13th arrondissement of Paris. There, however, only the automotive parts and lesser fittings were built in: the armoured hull was in its entirety prefabricated by forges serving as subcontractors. At first, the main supplying company was Batignolles-Châtillon at Nantes, which could supply a maximum of about twenty per month; in 1940, the forge at Firminy became dominant. Likewise the turret, fitted with its armament by the Atelier de construction de Rueil (ARL), was made by subcontractors, mainly the Société française de constructions mécaniques (or "Cail") at Denain. Turret production tended to trail behind that of the hulls; on 1 September 1939, this order backlog had grown to 35; that there was little hope of solving this problem is shown by the production planned on 28 October 1939 for the spring of 1940: fifty hulls as against forty turrets per month.

At the time of acceptance in 1934, it had already been decided to order fifteen on 25 April 1934 and fifteen more on 20 May at a price of ₣ 275,000 per hull, more expensive than a French light infantry tank of the period. The actual orders were made on 1 January and 29 April 1935 respectively, and the notification sent on 27 May, with a planned delivery between January and March 1936. Due to strikes, the first vehicles of these orders were only delivered from 2 February 1937 onwards; nineteen had been produced by April, the last delivered in November. The two first orders together can be seen as a separate preseries of thirty, differing slightly in many details from later produced vehicles.

A third order for eighty vehicles was made on 15 September 1935 but only notified on 11 August 1937. They were scheduled to be delivered between January and July 1938, but due to strikes and delays in the production of the turrets, the actual dates were 24 June 1938 and 10 February 1939.

There were another three orders for which deliveries started before the war: one of forty dated 11 January 1938 and delivered between 13 February and 31 July 1939; a fifth of 35 cars made on the same date but delivered between July and December 1939 (six before the war) after a sixth order for eighty vehicles made on 18 January 1938 and delivered between June and November 1939 (57 before 1 September 1939).

On 1 September 1939, 219 vehicles had been delivered including prototypes, 71 behind schedule. However, production increases soon allowed Panhard to reduce the backlog — at least for the hulls. From December, vehicles were produced from two later orders: a seventh of forty, made on 18 January 1938 and completed between December 1939 and April 1940; and an eighth of eighty vehicles delivered from January until the middle of May 1940. The monthly deliveries were: nine in September 1939, eleven in October, eighteen in November, twenty-two in December, twenty-five in January 1940, eight in February, sixteen in March, thirty-four in April and a final thirty in May 1940. The total production of completed vehicles of the standard version of the AMD 35 for France was thus 339.

However, the total manufactured of all vehicles of the larger Panhard 178 family was much higher as there were several non-standard versions — and not all production was completed for France. Firstly, there was a radio command variant, twelve of which had been ordered in 1937 and again in 1938, the notification of which was issued on 9 December 1938, the 24 vehicles being delivered between October and December 1939. The next variant was a colonial version, eight of which were produced. The most important addendum consisted of an order for 128 modified vehicles destined for North-Africa. Furthermore, there were two last orders of the standard version, one of twelve notified on 22 July 1939, the second for a hundred made on 27 September 1939, of which both only fourteen hulls would be made for France.

Of all these orders, at the time of the armistice in June, 491 had been completed. On 7 June, 52 hulls were in stock for which no turret was as yet available; probably by 22 June, another ten hulls were made for a total production of 553: 30 in 1937, 81 in 1938, 236 in 1939 and 206 in 1940. Total hull production of all versions had been: 24 in September 1939, 26 in October, 27 in November, 33 in December, 36 in January 1940, 40 in February, 32 in March, 42 in April, 32 in May and 24 until the interruption in the middle of June. After the armistice, another 176 were completed, from prefabricated parts, for the German occupier, for a total of 729.

These actual production numbers can be compared to the production plans. Before the war, it had been intended that war manufacture would be thirty per month. When war really broke out, it was soon realised that the need to raise new units, the replacement of older, worn out vehicles and the creation of a matériel reserve to compensate the loss of about 20% of the cars of a combat unit per month during a campaign, would necessitate a much higher production level, even when resorting to the expedient of fitting surplus hulls with older turrets. It had been planned on 10 October 1939 to bring production to forty per month in March, fifty in July, fifty-five in September and sixty from November 1940 for the duration of the war. Later projections were even more pessimistic: accordingly, on top of the 657 vehicles notified at that date, on 15 April 1940 another 450 were ordered, a third of them of the radio version, bringing total orders to 1,107. The desired peak rate of sixty vehicles was put forward with two months to September 1940; on 1 October, 1,018 vehicles had to be completed. However, the planned production was now limited to March 1941; as supreme commander Maurice Gamelin had concluded on 27 February 1940 from the events during Fall Weiss that lightly armoured vehicles could not survive on the modern battlefield, thus, from the spring of 1941, the Panhard 178 had to be replaced on the production lines by the heavy Panhard AM 40 P armoured car, which was to be much more heavily armoured and armed.

== Description ==
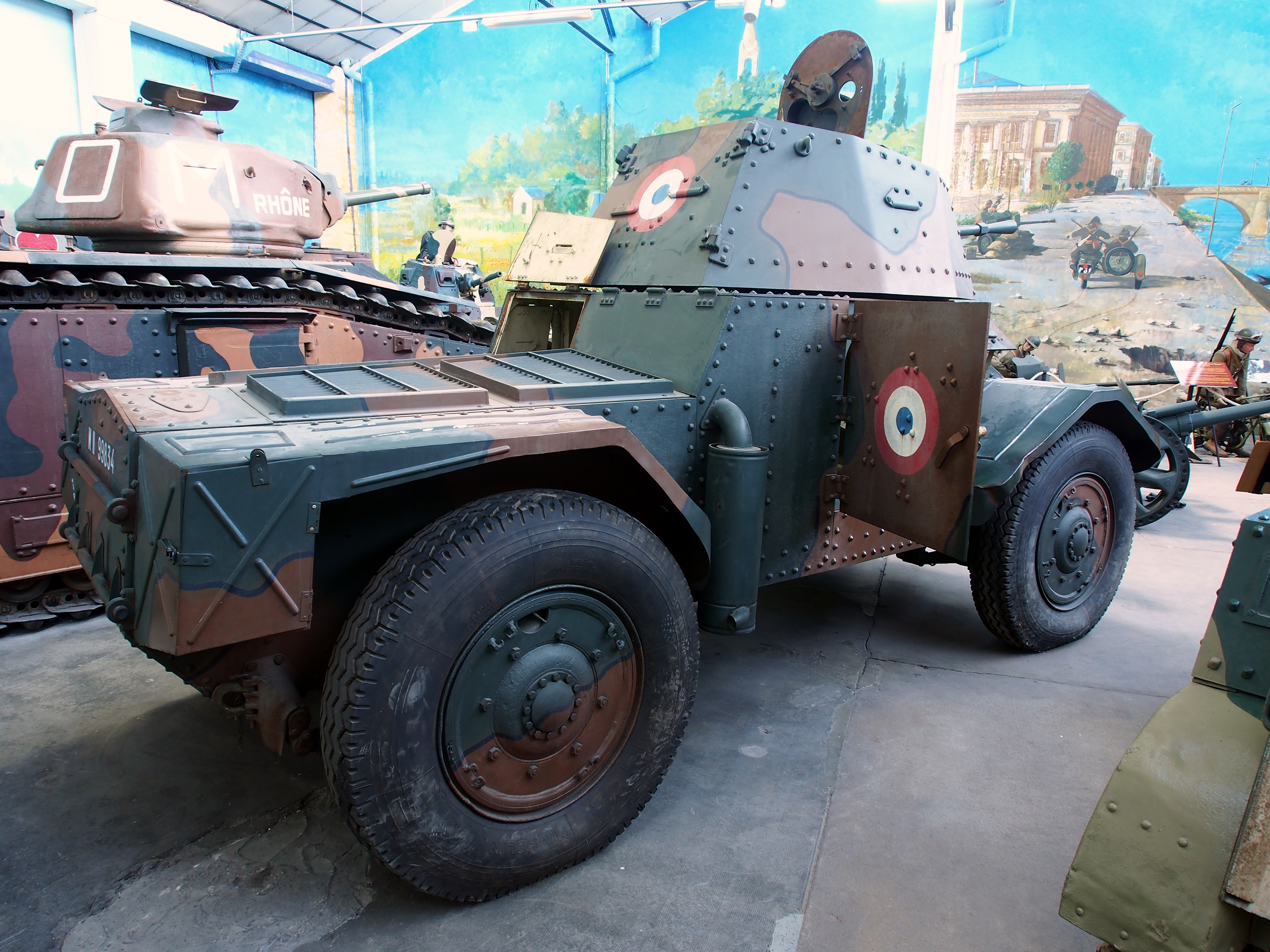
The Panhard 178 from the right side

=== Design ===
In order to function as an effective long-range reconnaissance vehicle, the Panhard 178 had been kept as light as possible. The vehicle was thus rather small, only 4.79 m (15 ft 9 in) in length, 2.01 m (6 ft 7 in) wide and 2.31 m (7 ft 7 in) in height (1.65 m for the hull per se). Also, the tapering engine compartment, where a Panhard ISK 4FII bis V4, 6332 CC, 105 hp at 2000 rpm motor had been installed, was built very low, giving the vehicle its distinctive silhouette, with a protruding fighting compartment. Both compartments were separated by a fireproof bulkhead. The use of a large turret with 26 mm frontal armour and 13 mm side armour, combined with 7 mm (bottom), 9 mm (top and glacis), 13 mm (back, sides and front superstructure) and 20 mm (nose) bolted and riveted armour plate for the hull, had compromised weight considerations, however, so the vehicle still weighed 8.2 metric tonnes. However, the mobility was rather good for a French AFV of the period: a maximum speed of 72.6 km/h (45.1 mph), a cruising speed of 47 km/h (29 mph) and a practical range of about 300 km (190 mi), made possible by two fuel tanks of 120 and 20 litres, the main one located at the extreme back of the hull.

However, rough terrain capacity was somewhat limited: though all four road wheels were actuated, the leaf spring suspension confined the off-road speed to 42 km/h and the possession of just four wheels allowed for a wading and a trench crossing capacity of only 60 cm; it could overcome a 30 cm vertical obstacle, assisted by two small bottom wheels in the front hull.

The driver was in the front, using an eight-speed gear box and a normal steering wheel. Steering could be switched into reverse immediately to allow the assistant-driver, facing the rear and seated to the left of the engine (or, from his point of view: the right), to drive the vehicle backwards in case of an emergency, using all four off-road gears, with a maximum speed of 42 km/h. This "dual drive" capacity is common for reconnaissance vehicles. The second driver had a separate entrance door at the left side of the hull. He doubled as a radio operator in the platoon commander or squadron commander vehicles, operating the short range ER29 or medium range ER26 set respectively. To make long-range communications possible, one out of twelve armoured cars was a special radio vehicle.

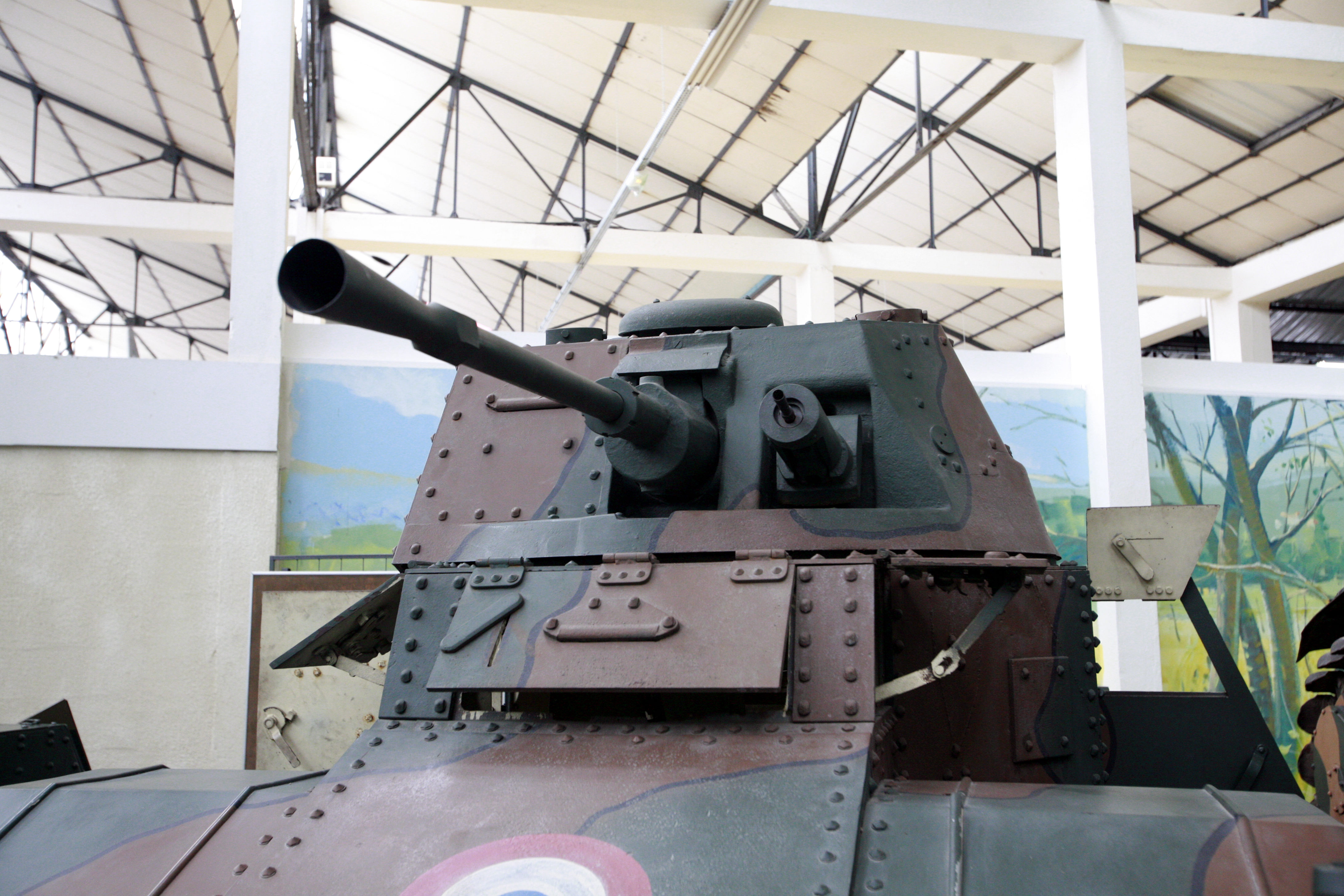
The APX3 turret

The APX3 turret, having a large double hatch on the back, was rather large and could accommodate two men, like with the AMC 35; this was at the time exceptional for French AFVs. In the electrically traversed APX3, the commander on the right and gunner on the left benefited from a rudimentary turret basket, and sufficient vision devices including one periscope (which were of the Gundlach type on late examples) per man and PPL.RX.168 episcopes.

=== Armament ===
Armament was first intended to be a newly developed 20 mm gun; when this failed to materialise, it was considered to use a 37 mm Modèle 16 gun, standard for armoured cars, but this was rejected because of its poor anti-armour capacity. Instead, the 25 mm SA 35 was chosen, a shortened L/47.2 derivation of the standard French antitank gun, the 25 mm Hotchkiss modèle 34. It was fitted with the L711 sight. To compensate for the shorter barrel, the rounds use heavier charges, giving even a slightly superior muzzle velocity of 950 m/s. The gun had a maximum penetration of about 50 mm when using a tungsten round; the light 380 gram projectile was easily deflected by sloped armour though, even a 45° angle giving about 100% extra protection over the armour thickness measured along the horizontal plane. German tanks had many vertical plates, however, and were vulnerable up to about 800 metres; on the other hand, the light round, even when penetrating, often failed to set fire to an enemy vehicle; it sometimes took fifteen shots to achieve this; 150 rounds of ammunition were stored.

The secondary armament was an optionally coaxial Reibel 7.5 mm machine gun, with 3,750 rounds, 1,500 of which were armour-piercing. A reserve machine gun was carried to the right of the driver that could be mounted on top of the turret for anti-aircraft defence. Its magazines were carried on the inner walls of the fighting compartment, including the large main entrance door on the right.

=== Shortcomings and further improvements ===
Experience showed that the type had several shortcomings: a weak clutch, slow turret rotation, a cramped interior, unreliable radio sets, poor cross-country drive and very noisy brakes. On the other hand, it was reliable, easy to drive on roads and the engine as such was rather silent; all desirable qualities for a reconnaissance vehicle.

During the production run, several modifications would be made, such as the fitting of lifting hooks. The first thirty vehicles had two more primitive periscopes on the turret roof, a Chrétien diascope on its front and simple vision slits with armoured shutters on its sides; their drivers too had to use vision slits instead of an episcope. They also lacked a silencer and had semi-circular cut-outs at the wheel plate edges. From about the 111th vehicle (or fourth production batch) onward, several changes were introduced, including the fitting of an armoured ventilator covering on top of the turret, a factory plate with the name "Panhard" on the nose and a new softer factory camouflage pattern with the brown and bronze green spots no longer separated by black lines. From the 270th vehicle onwards stowage boxes were constructed on the back fenders, obscuring the pointed form of the engine compartment. The last turrets produced also had a backward pointing episcope for the commander, instead of a vision slit.

== Operational history ==
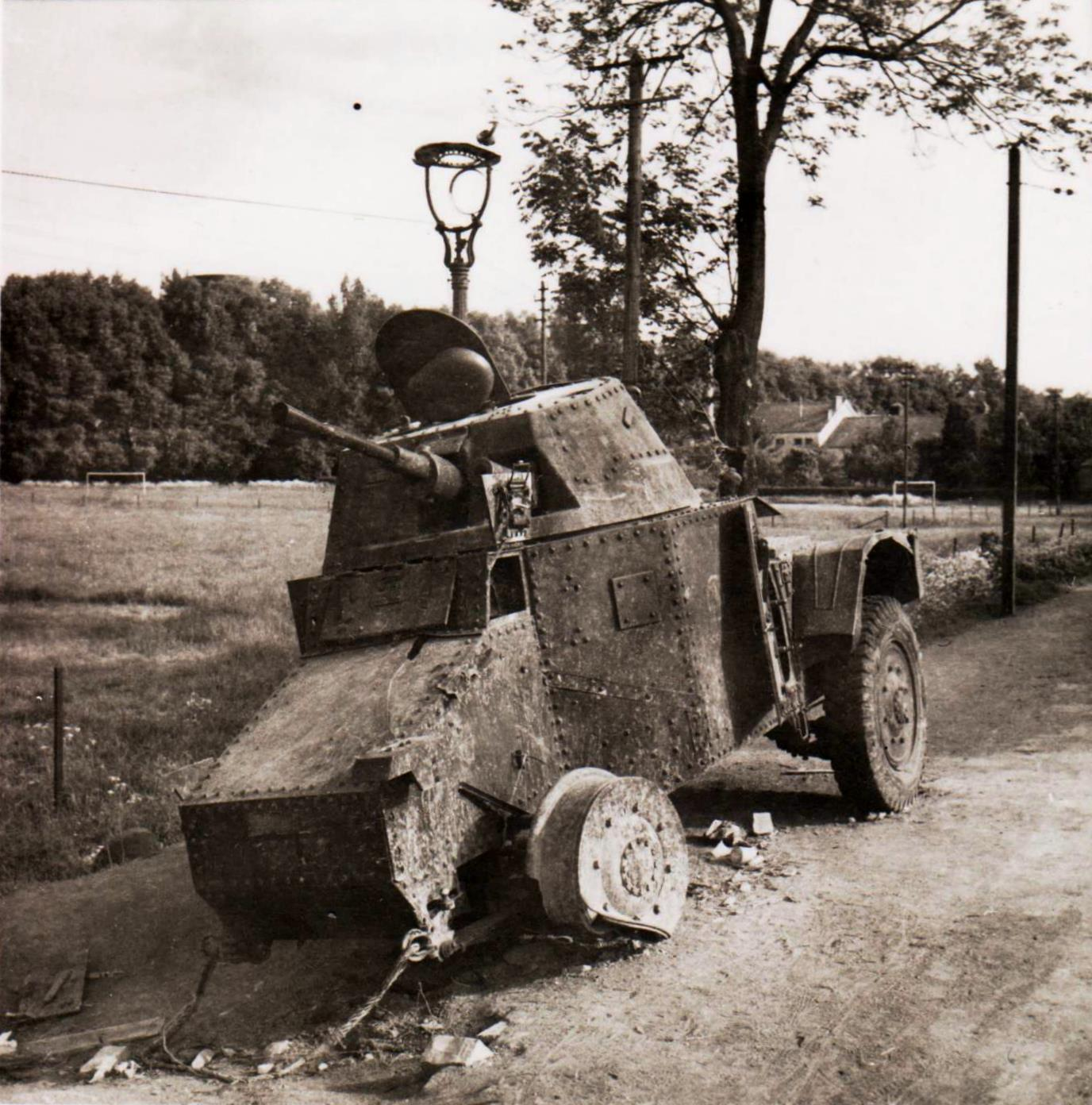
A destroyed Panhard 178 of the 3rd Division Légère de Cavalerie, May 1940

The first nineteen vehicles were in April 1937 taken into service by 6e Cuirassiers. At the outbreak of the Second World War 218 vehicles were fielded with eleven squadrons.

In the spring of 1940, 21e Escadron d'AMD 35 was first destined for Finland and the Winter War but then sent to Narvik to assist Norway during Weserübung. It was in fact the renamed 4e GRDI (that would be replaced by a new unit of the same name in its former parent 15th Mechanised Infantry Division on 5 May) and was equipped with thirteen Panhard 178s.

During the Battle of France from 10 May 1940, on which date about 370 completed vehicles were available, the Panhard 178s were allocated to reconnaissance units of the mechanised and motorised forces. At the time, the Panhard 178 represented one of the best armoured cars in its class in the world.

The Cavalry's three armoured divisions, the Divisions Légères Mécaniques, had a nominal organic strength of forty armoured cars, plus four radio vehicles and an organic matériel reserve of four vehicles. This would make for a total of 144 in these mechanised light divisions. The Cavalry's Light (i.e. motorised) Divisions, the Divisions Légères de Cavalerie, had a squadron of twelve Panhards plus a radio car and a matériel reserve of four in their Régiment de Automitrailleuses (RAM). The total in the Cavalry Light Divisions would thus be 85.

The type was not just used by the Cavalry; the Infantry employed them in the GRDIs or Groupes de Reconnaissance de Division d'Infanterie, the reconnaissance units of the Divisions d'Infanterie Mécaniques, which (despite their name) were largely motorised infantry divisions. These were 1er GRDI for 5e DIM, 2e GRDI for 9e DIM, 3e GRDI for 12e DIM, 4e GRDI for 15e DIM, 5e GRDI for 25e DIM, 6e GRDI for 3e DIM and 7e GRDI for 1e DIM. Their organisation was basically identical to the units of the DLCs, but the strength was sixteen, making for a total of 112 vehicles.

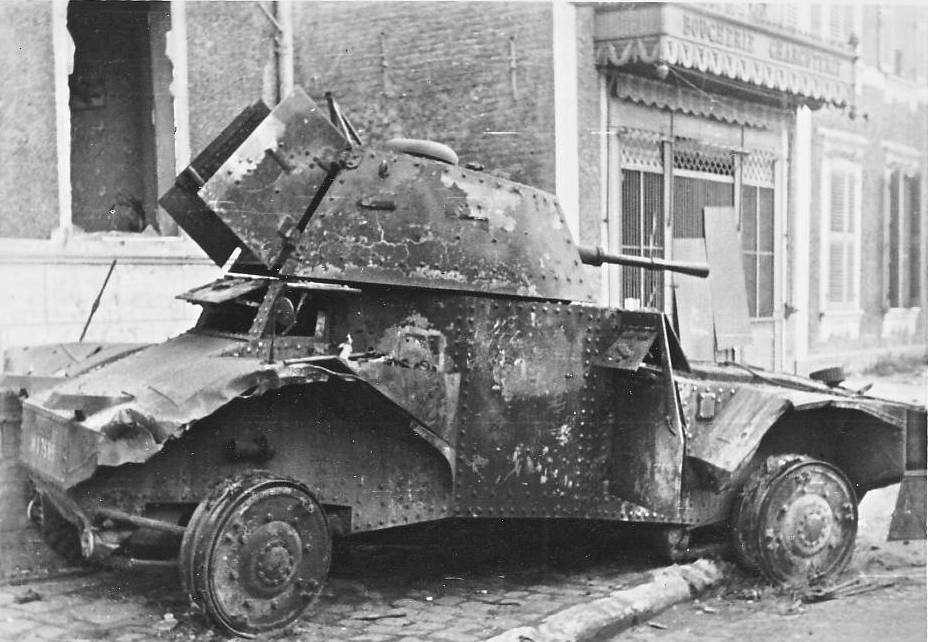
A Panhard 178 of the 2e GRDI destroyed in May 1940

The actual strength of above units might differ, but if all were on strength 24 vehicles were present in the matériel reserve or used for driver training, as apart from colonial vehicles, 378 had been delivered on 10 May 1940. After the start of the invasion, several emergency ad hoc units were formed; these included the 32e GRDI for the regular 43e DI, having five Panhards. The 4e DCR, the armoured division of the Infantry hastily assembled in May, got 43 Panhard 178s.

The DLMs used their Panhard units for strategic reconnaissance. In the case of 1DLM, this entailed a movement well in advance of the main body of the division as it was supposed to maintain a connection with the Dutch Army during the Battle of the Netherlands. Within 32 hours, the armoured cars of the group Lestoquoi covered a distance of over 200 kilometres reaching the environment of 's-Hertogenbosch in the afternoon of 11 May. After some successful skirmishes with German armoured cars belonging to the reconnaissance platoons of the German Infanterie Divisionen, they withdrew, as the Dutch were already in full retreat. They were asked by the Dutch to assist an infantry attack on the southern bridgehead of the strategic Moerdijk bridges, held by German paratroopers. As the cars were not suitable for such a task, the commander hesitated after incorrectly concluding the bridgehead was strongly defended. While thus being immobile, this group of Panhards was surprised in open polder landscape by a Stuka-attack with one vehicle disabled and quickly withdrew to the south.

The other two DLMs hurried forward to stop the advance of 3 and 4PD after the surprisingly swift fall of Fort Eben-Emael, their Panhards fighting a successful delaying battle against their German counterparts until the Battle of Hannut, the largest tank battle of the campaign. In general, they had little trouble in dispatching the lightly armoured German armoured cars, whose 20 mm main armament was not very effective against the Panhard frontal armour.

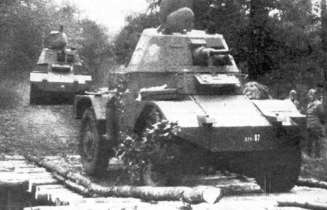
Panhards in German use

As the type was well-suited to German tactics, at least 190 Panhards, most of them brand-new, were issued to German reconnaissance units for use in Operation Barbarossa in 1941 under the designation of Panzerspähwagen P204 (f); 107 would be lost that year. Among these were some radio vehicles, designated Panzerspähwagen (Funk) P204 (f). Thirty Panhards were listed as in use on the Eastern Front on 31 May 1943. Some of these were fitted with spaced armour.

After the liberation of France, the 1e Groupement Mobile de Reconnaissance would, among a bewildering variety of types, also use some Panhard 178s, some of these modified.

== Modified Panhards ==
=== Radio vehicles ===
The Panhard units were intended for deep strategic reconnaissance and thus could be expected to operate well in advance of the main forces. To fulfil their task of relaying information, long range radio connections were necessary. Therefore, one in twelve vehicles had to be of a special radio "command" version (Poste Commande) with the turret fixed in place and without armament but equipped with the ER27 set, giving a range of 80 - 150 kilometres, and two ER26ter sets with a range of sixty kilometres for communications within the squadron.

A dozen "PC vehicles" had been ordered in both 1937 and 1938, the number of 24 being notified on 9 December 1938. The first was planned to be delivered in February, but only materialised in October 1939, followed by seventeen in November and six in December. They were rebuilt with the ER 27 set in the Fort d'Issy. As this number was clearly insufficient to equip all units, on 15 April 1940 an additional 150 PCs were ordered, bringing the total to 174; none of the new order had been built before the armistice.

=== North African version ===
From 14 to 29 October 1936, the original Panhard 178 prototype, leaving Bordeaux on 15 September, was tested by the 6e Cuirassiers in Morocco, successfully negotiating about three thousand kilometres of desert and mountain tracks, resulting in an acceptance of the type for desert use on 15 January 1937, though a suitable modification was advised, including the fitting of a lighter turret.

The North African forces were in need of two reconnaissance armoured car types: a light one, for which role the Laffly S15 TOE was envisaged, and a heavy one, the automitrailleuse lourde, for which the Panhard 178 was chosen. Initially it was planned to uparm the vehicle, at first with a 37, then a 47 mm gun, but on 14 January 1939 the quickly deteriorating international situation forced the acceptance of a variant, the AMD 35 type Afrique française du Nord, not very different from the standard version: apart from small internal fittings changes, the main difference was the installation of a heavy duty radiator, better adapted to the hot desert climate of the North African colonies.

Two orders had been made on 3 June 1938, one of twenty and another of twelve vehicles. A third order of 96 cars was dated 3 February 1939; it was intended to raise eight squadrons in Africa, each of sixteen vehicles. The first of these orders was only notified on 26 May 1939. Construction on the vehicles started in December but had to be halted due to a lack of the special radiators, 161 of which had only been ordered on 10 October; eventually, they were manufactured from the second week of May 1940, at this time forming the main bulk of Panhard 178 production: 78 were delivered that month. On 7 June, of the 128 ordered, 71 had been delivered, two were present in a completed form in the factory stock, and 39 hulls were ready lacking a turret. Until the armistice at least another 41 were delivered, for a minimal total of 112 AMD 35 AFNs. None of these vehicles would in fact be shipped to North Africa; they were used by newly raised (especially 10e Cuirassiers, part of Charles de Gaulle's 4e DCR), reconstituted or ad hoc-units in France.

=== Colonial version ===
On 14 September 1938, an order was notified of four vehicles for colonial use in Indo-China, equipped by ARL with the smaller one-man APX5 turret, as used on the AMR 35 ZT2, armed with a 25 mm gun and 7.5 mm machine-gun. The crew thus consists of three men. Two of these were delivered in June 1939, the other two the next month. These first four left for Indo-China on 12 October; at least one was captured by Japan. A second order of four for colonial Panhard 178s was notified on 10 June 1939; one was delivered in December 1939; the last three in January 1940, bringing the final total for this version to eight. The last four vehicles were still in France at the time of the German invasion and were issued to the army in June despite lacking their turrets, and some, probably still without their turrets, were clandestinely incorporated by the Vichy forces after the armistice.

=== Tank Destroyer variant ===
Though sufficient at a short range, the effectiveness of the 25 mm gun was far from optimal. On 14 January 1939, it was in principle decided to arm the Panhard with the 47 mm SA 35 gun but as this ordnance was in short supply priority had to be given to uparming tank types still equipped with the SA 34 gun, such as the Char B and the first Char D2 series. In the autumn of 1939, the building of a number of tank destroyers was already being considered, as too few units had a motorised anti-tank capacity. n April 1940, Panhard proposed its Voiture spéciale 207, basically a Panhard 178 fitted in the back with a rearward-facing powerful 47 mm SA 37 gun.

This type was still in development when the crisis in May and the lack of APX3 turrets — Cail had been overrun and it had been decided to deliver most vehicles as "turretless AMDs" to the troops — led to an emergency programme to fit the surplus hulls with a new turret type. On 29 May 1940, Renault was contacted and quickly initial ideas of improvising an open-topped turret for a 25 mm gun grew into a new closed turret, a design by Engineer Joseph Restany, capable of holding the much more powerful standard 47 mm SA 35 tank gun, a first version of which was finished on 31 May. To provide enough room to operate the larger gun, the back of the new octagonal turret was raised, resulting in an extreme wedge-shaped profile. The armour consisted of welded 25 mm plates all-around, reinforced on the front with a spaced appliqué 13 mm plate. The turret had a single rather narrow top hatch and lacked the rear hatch that had been usual for French designs. The turret had to be rotated by hand, an electrical drive being absent. Also, a machine-gun was lacking. A single vehicle was tested on 5 June and completed on 6 June, but plans to build forty vehicles of the type from 11 June at a rate of four a day came to naught, despite an official order on 13 June, and the intention of attaining a monthly production of thirty-five from August onwards, as Paris was declared an open city on 10 June and the factory evacuated on 12 June. The single vehicle, provisionally called the Voiture 47, was allocated to 1er RAM on 6 June and, on 15 June, defended a bridge near Etignie, destroying two German "heavy tanks" (of an unspecified type) and a column trying to force a crossing. On 17 June, 10:00, it was destroyed by its own crew at Cosnes-sur-Loire when their unit was unable to cross the Loire river with its heavy equipment.

On 2 June, it was hoped to mount a 47 mm SA 34 or a 25 mm gun on the "turretless AMDs", protected by a superstructure made of 16 to 20 mm armour plate. Photographic evidence proves that at least one vehicle was fitted with a superstructure but not whether this was armed. Additionally, a few could probably be equipped with a gun shield for a machine gun, most being issued as pure hulls.

=== Modifications by Germany, Vichy France and Italy ===
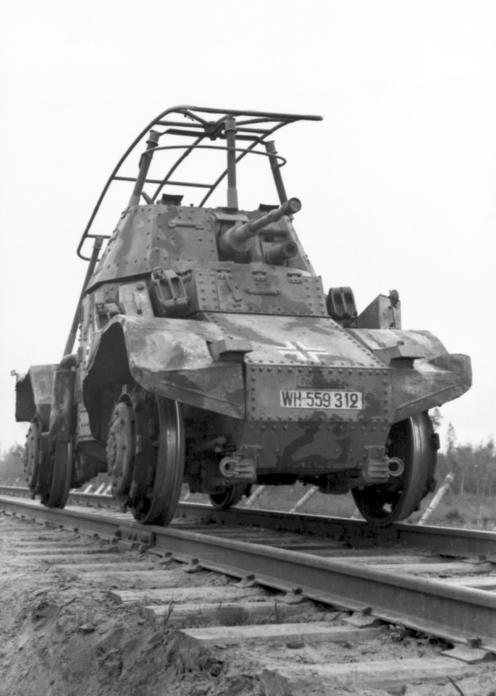
A Panhard modified as Schienenpanzer

After 1941, the Germans modified 43 cars as railway-protection vehicles (Schienenpanzer); they could drive on the tracks themselves by means of special wheels and were fitted with large radio frame aerials.

Under the armistice conditions, the Vichy regime was allowed to use 64 Panhards for police service. These vehicles, mainly taken from the May–June production batches, had their guns removed and replaced with an additional machine gun. On orders of the Army, the Camouflage du Matériel branch, Engineer J. Restany, using the false name "J-J. Ramon", from April 1941 clandestinely produced 45 new turrets, fitted with a 47 mm SA 35 (about twenty) or a 25 mm gun in order to equip an equal number of hulls hidden from the Germans; some were eventually combined with the hulls for trial purposes. The turrets were of a new design but strongly resembled Restany's 47 mm turret of June 1940. They used 20 mm armour plates for the vertical surfaces and 10 mm plate for the top. To the top hatch, a rear hatch was added. On 28 January 1942, all turrets had been finished. Later, a 7.5 mm FM 24/29 machine-gun was fitted to the right of the main armament. These hulls and cars were partly hidden or dumped in lakes when the whole of France was occupied in November 1942. Some vehicles, however, were used by the Germans in the Sicherungs-Aufklärungs-Abteilung 100. In the summer of 1944, some were perhaps taken into use by the resistance.

In 1944, some of the 34 Panhards captured by the Germans when they overran Vichy-France in November 1942, were rebuilt with the 5 cm KwK 38 L/42 or 5 cm PaK 38 L/60 gun in an open-topped turret and used for occupation duty. In November 1942, the Italian Army also captured two Panhards, which would be used by them until September 1943.

== Panhard 178B ==
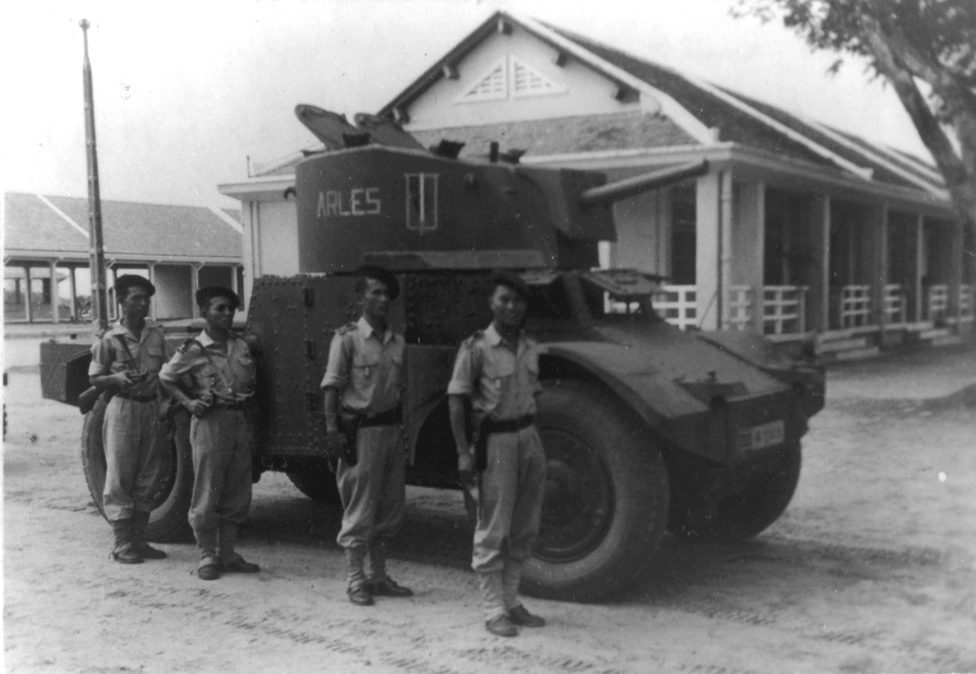
A Panhard 178B in Vietnam

In late 1944, a new turret was designed by Fives Lille, the FL1. It had a cylindrical "camembert" form allowing for more space to install the larger 75 mm SA 45 L/32 gun. The type with the new turret, a new four cylinder engine and the EM3/R61 radio set was named Panhard 178B and taken into production at Firminy; a first order of 150 was made on 5 January 1945 and confirmed on 31 July 1945. However, before actual manufacture started, it was decided to fit the smaller 47 mm SA 35 gun and a machine gun. In total, 414 vehicles were manufactured, making for a grand total of 1,143 Panhard 178 cars. In contradistinction to this Panhard 178B, older vehicles are sometimes designated Panhard 178"A", though this designation is not contemporary. The B-version was used in France and the colonies, such as Syria, Tahiti, Madagascar and Vietnam. The last French use was in Djibouti in 1960 by the 15e Escadron Blindé d'Infanterie de Marine; Syria still used the type in February 1964 during the uprising in Damascus.

== Sources ==
- White, B.T., 1972, Tanks and other Armoured Fighting Vehicles of World War II, Peerage Books, London ISBN 0 907408 35 4
- Pierre Touzin, Les véhicules blindés français, 1900-1944, EPA, 1979.
- Pierre Touzin, Les Engins Blindés Français 1920-1945, Volume 1, SERA, 1976.
- Leland Ness (2002) Jane's World War II Tanks and Fighting Vehicles: The Complete Guide, Harper Collins, London and New York, ISBN 0-00-711228-9
- Pascal Danjou, 2004, L'Automitrailleuse de Découverte AMD 35 Panhard 178, Editions du Barbotin, Ballainvilliers
- François Vauvillier, 2008, "Produire l'AMD 35 Panhard: une affaire d'équipe", Histoire de Guerre, Blindés & Matériel, N° 82, p. 36-45
- Erik Barbanson, 2008, "J'ai piloté le prototype de l'AMD Panhard au Maroc", Histoire de Guerre, Blindés & Matériel, N° 85, p. 76-80
