= List of World War II weapons of France =

This is a list of French military equipment in the Second World War. This focuses primary on weapons issued to the French Army and Free French forces. Weapons used by the French Resistance vary but generally consist of French, Allied, and captured German weapons, alongside various miscellaneous equipment.

== Handguns ==
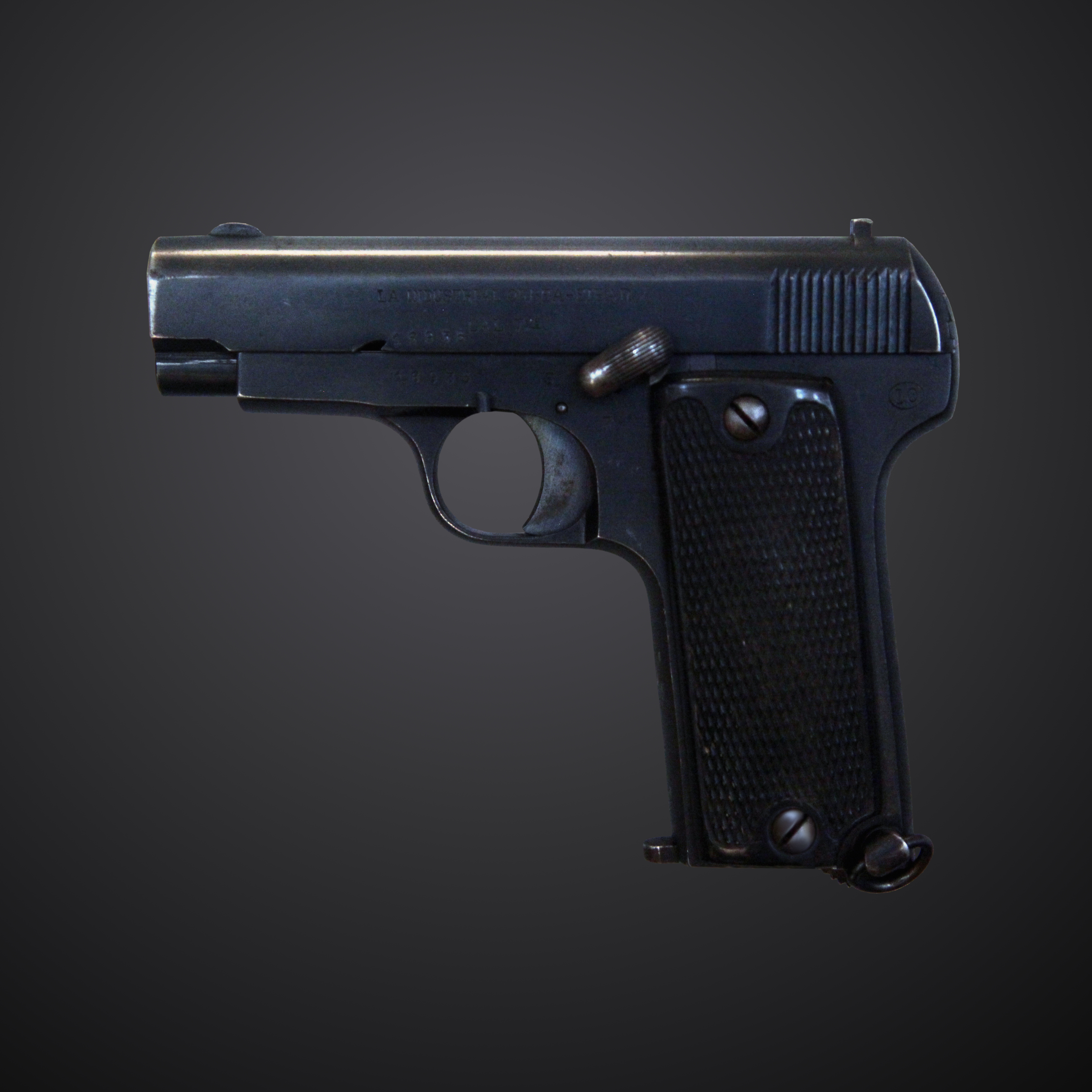
- Ruby pistol. This along with other French world war I Pistols and Revolvers would have been widely given to French troops in World War II who could not be given model 1935 army standard Pistols which were in short supply.
  Luger P08 (captured)
- MAB Model A
- MAB Model D pistol
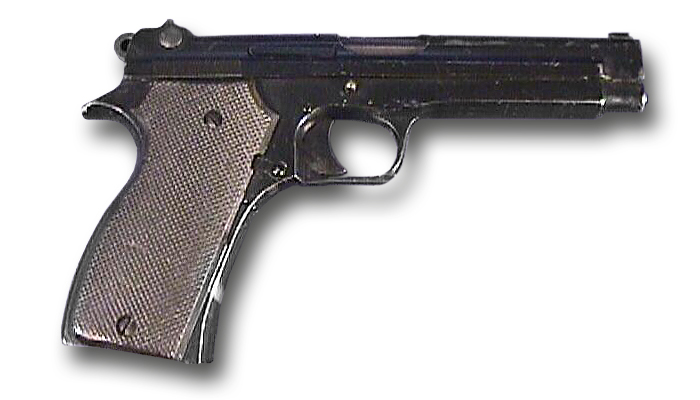
- Pistole modèle 1935A standard French sidearm during World War II. Only roughly 10,000 made before German occupation.
  Modèle 1935 pistol
- MAS 1873 revolver
- Modèle 1892 revolver
- M1911A1 (Lend-Lease)
- Ruby pistol
- Star Model 14
- Walther P38 (captured)

== Rifles ==
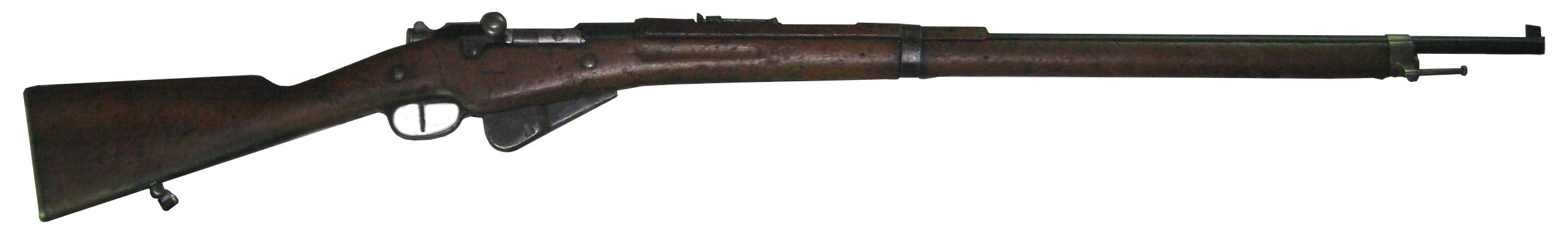
- Berthier Mle 1907/15 M16 rifle. Many late world war I era French rifles such as this Berthier rifle and other late World War I variant of Berthier and Lebel rifles were still in heavy use by French forces in World War II due to newer French rifles the MAS-36 and MAS-40(not in production) not being available in sufficient quantities for the French military. French forces used some Berthiers and Lebels rechambered for the new 7.5 French round.
  Berthier M1907/15 M16, Mousqueton M1916, and M34
- Fusil Automatique Modele 1917
- Fusil MAS-36
- Lebel M1886/93, M27, and R35
- M1903 Springfield (Free French forces)
- Lee–Enfield (supplied by the British to Free French forces)
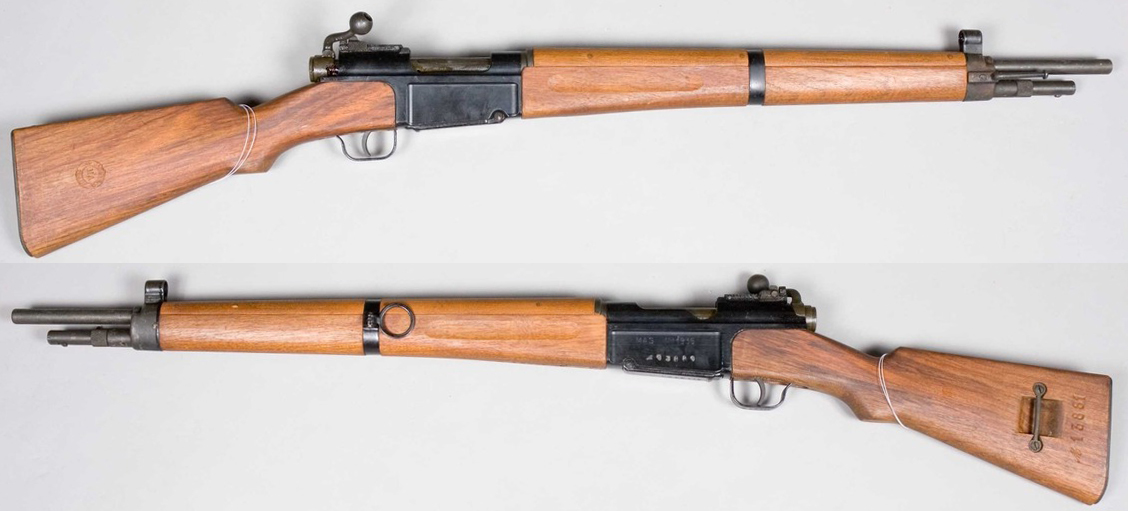
  MAS-36. Most modern rifle in widespread French military service in World war II. Only small numbers were produced before the war so only available in small numbers for French forces during World War II.
- M1917 Enfield (supplied by the US through Lend-lease to Free French forces)
- M1 Carbine (Free French forces)
- M1 Garand (Free French forces)
- Mauser K98k (captured)

== Submachine guns ==
- Delacre machine pistol
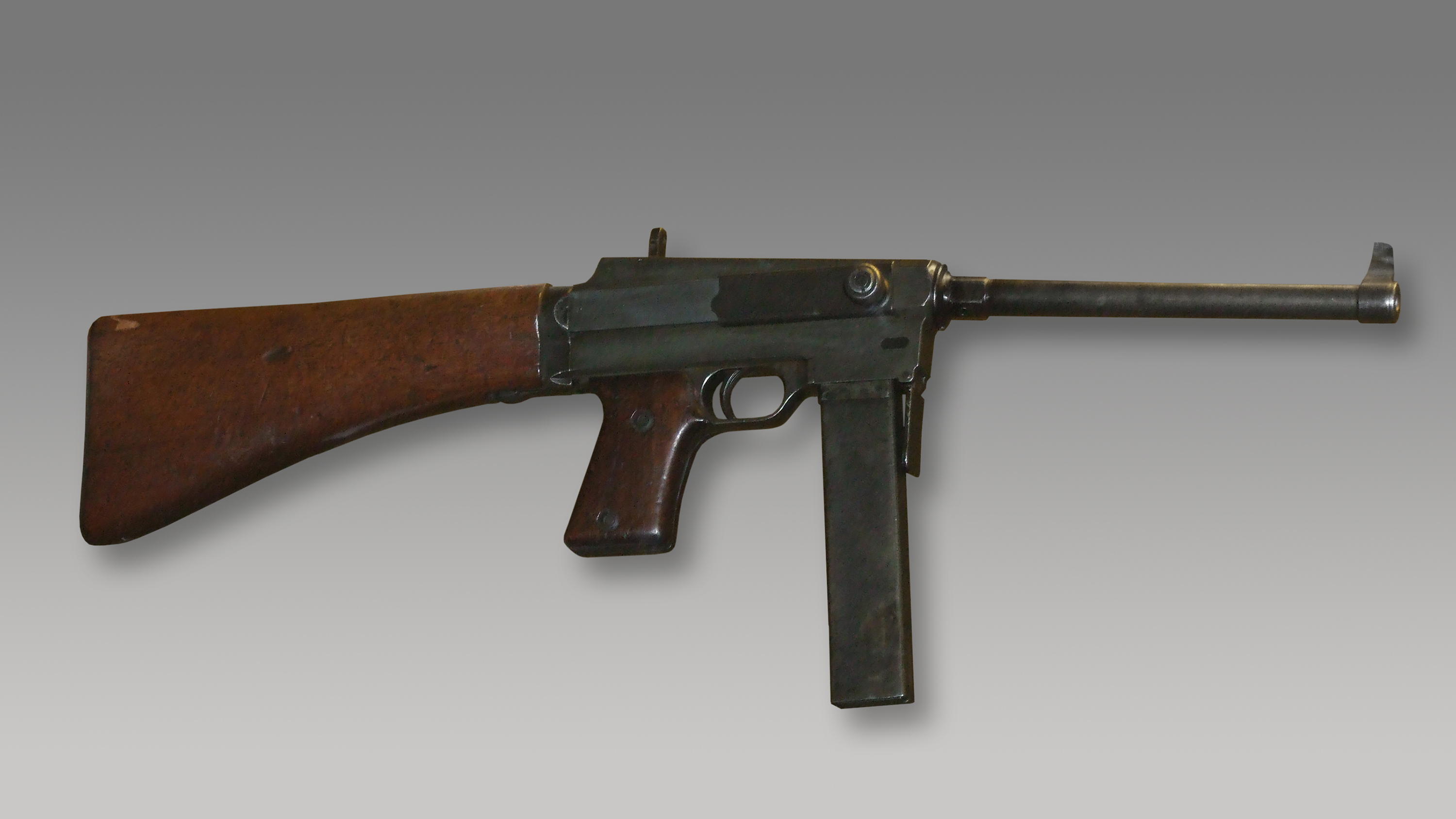
  MAS-38 French submachine gun. Production of this gun had just started in 1940 when the Germans occupied France. They used the gun as a substitute weapon. Somehow one of the guns was obtained by a partisan who used the MAS-38 to murder Benito Mussolini the Fascist leader of world war II Italy.
- ETVS submachine gun
- Erma EMP-35
- Thompson M1928 and M1928A1
- Bergmann MP 18
- MAS-38
- MP 40 (captured)
- Sten (Free French forces)
- Suomi KP/-31

== Machine guns ==
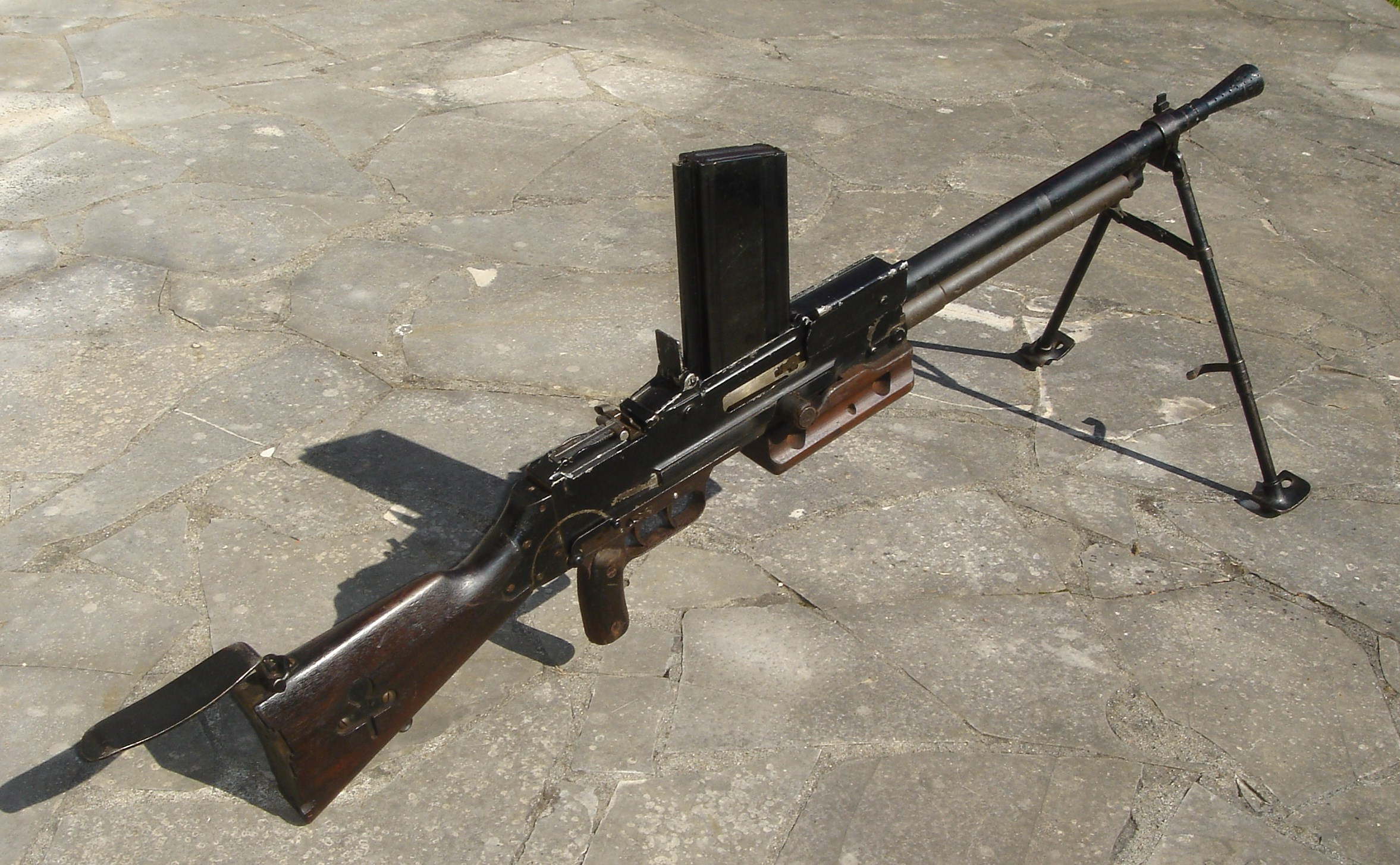
FM24/29 light machine gun commercially known as MAC 24/29. Was prioritised by the French and as a result unlike other French weapons designed after WW 1 production started quite early in the 1920's and so it was available in large quantities at the start of world war II allowing it to be widely used by French forces in World war II as their main light machine gun. This was the standard squad automatic weapon of the French infantry and cavalry in the battle of France

- Bren light machine gun (Free French forces)
- Chauchat
- Darne machine gun
- FM-24/29
- Hotchkiss M1909 Benét–Mercié machine gun
- Hotchkiss M1914 machine gun
- Hotchkiss M1922 machine gun
- M1918 Browning Automatic Rifle (Free French forces)
- MAC 1931
- MAC 1934
- Madsen
- Model 1924/1929D machine gun

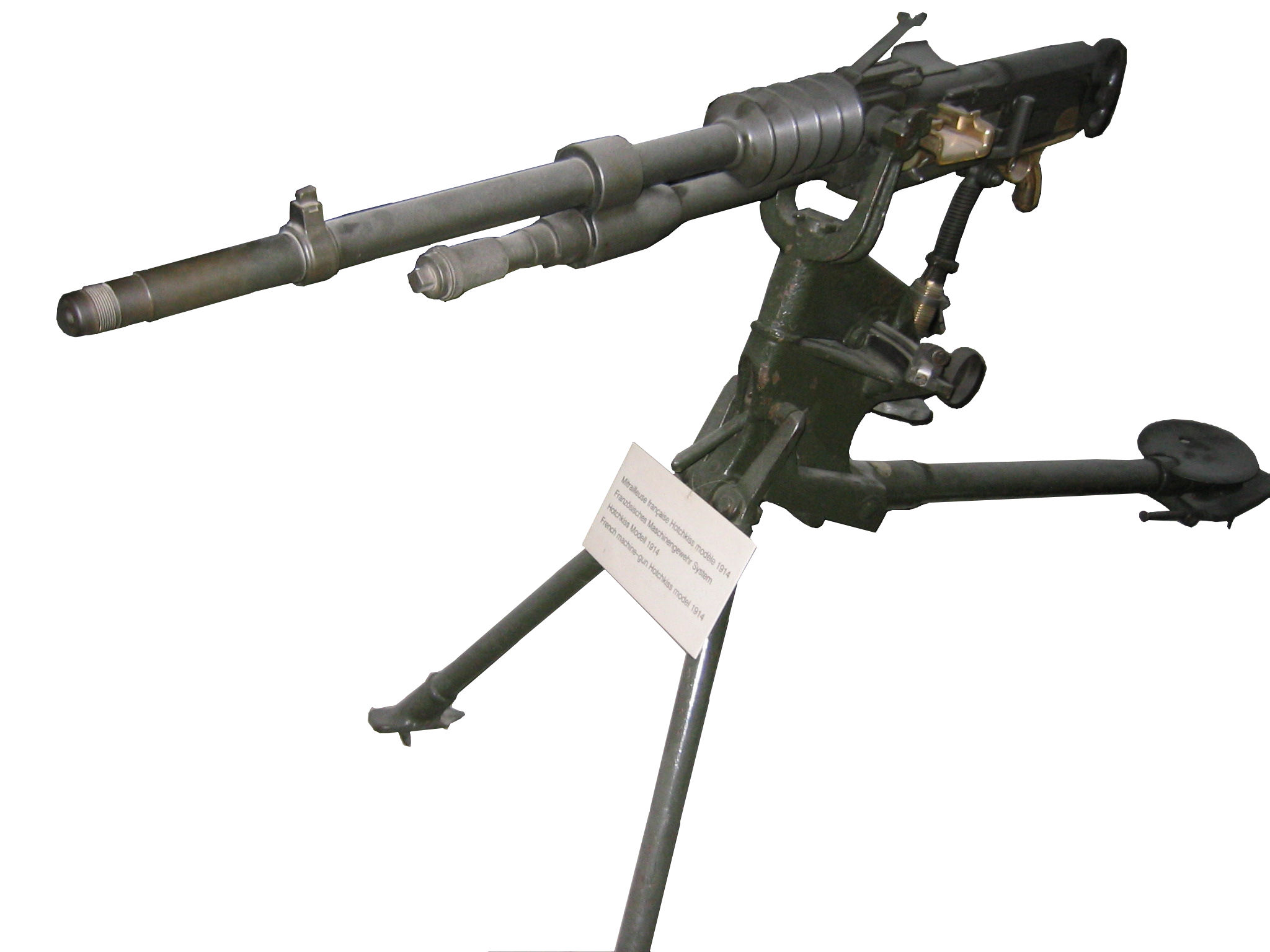
French Hotchkiss model 1914 machine gun. Used by the French in the later stages of World war I and as their standard medium machine gun in battle of France as they did not see any reason to replace it.

- Reibel machine gun
- St. Étienne Mle 1907
- Vickers machine gun
- 13.2 mm Hotchkiss machine gun

== Anti-Tank weapons ==
- Boys anti-tank rifle
- M1A1 Bazooka (Supplied to Free French forces)
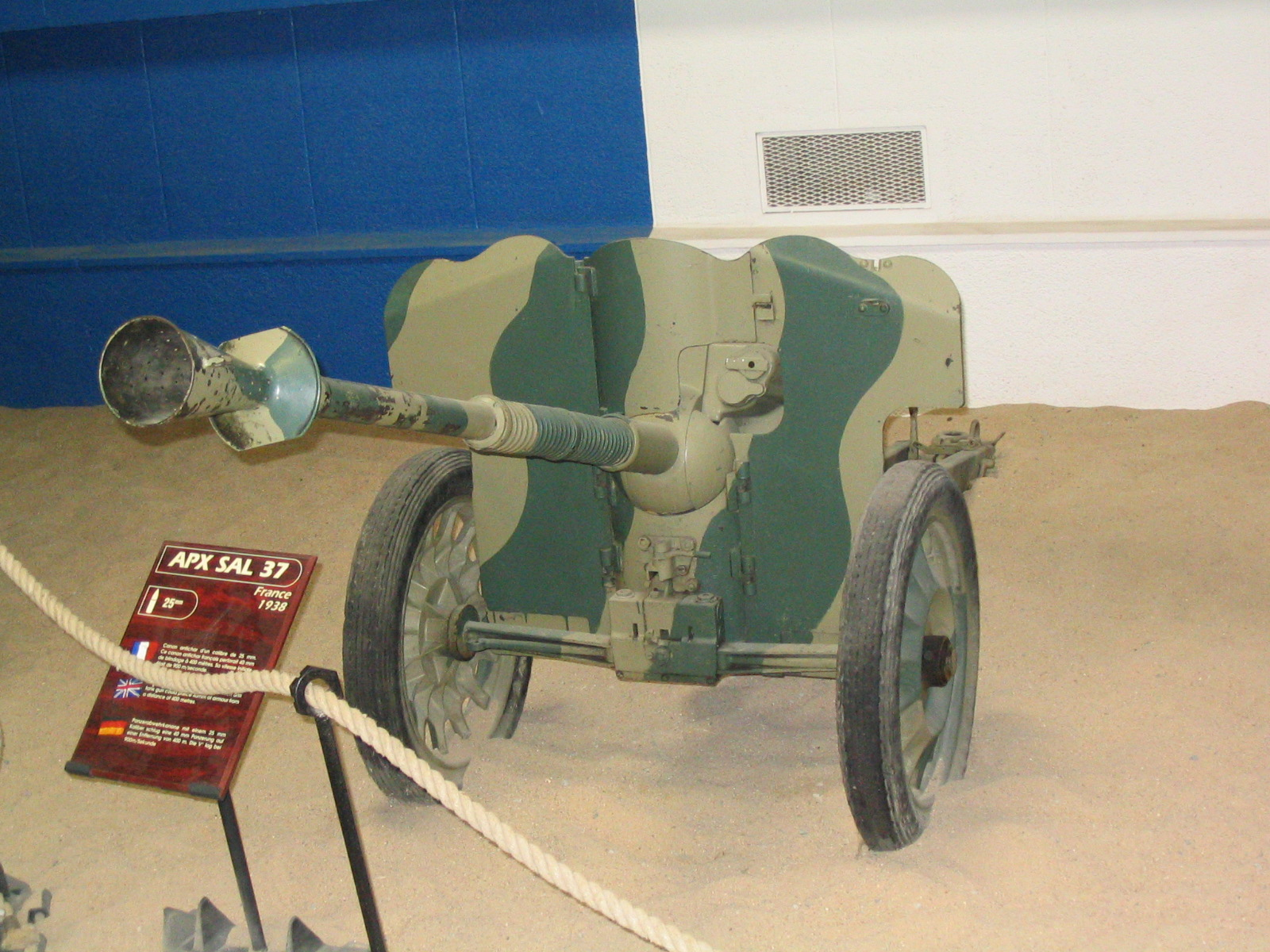
- Hotchkiss 25mm anti-tank gun main anti-tank gun of France during Battle of France. Emphasised mobility with its small calibre over penetration
  25 mm Hotchkiss anti-tank gun
- 47 mm APX anti-tank gun
- AC 37 anti-tank gun
- AC 47 anti-tank gun
- 47 mm Model 1931 anti-tank gun
- Canon de 75 modèle 1897 modifié 1933

== Anti-Aircraft weapons ==
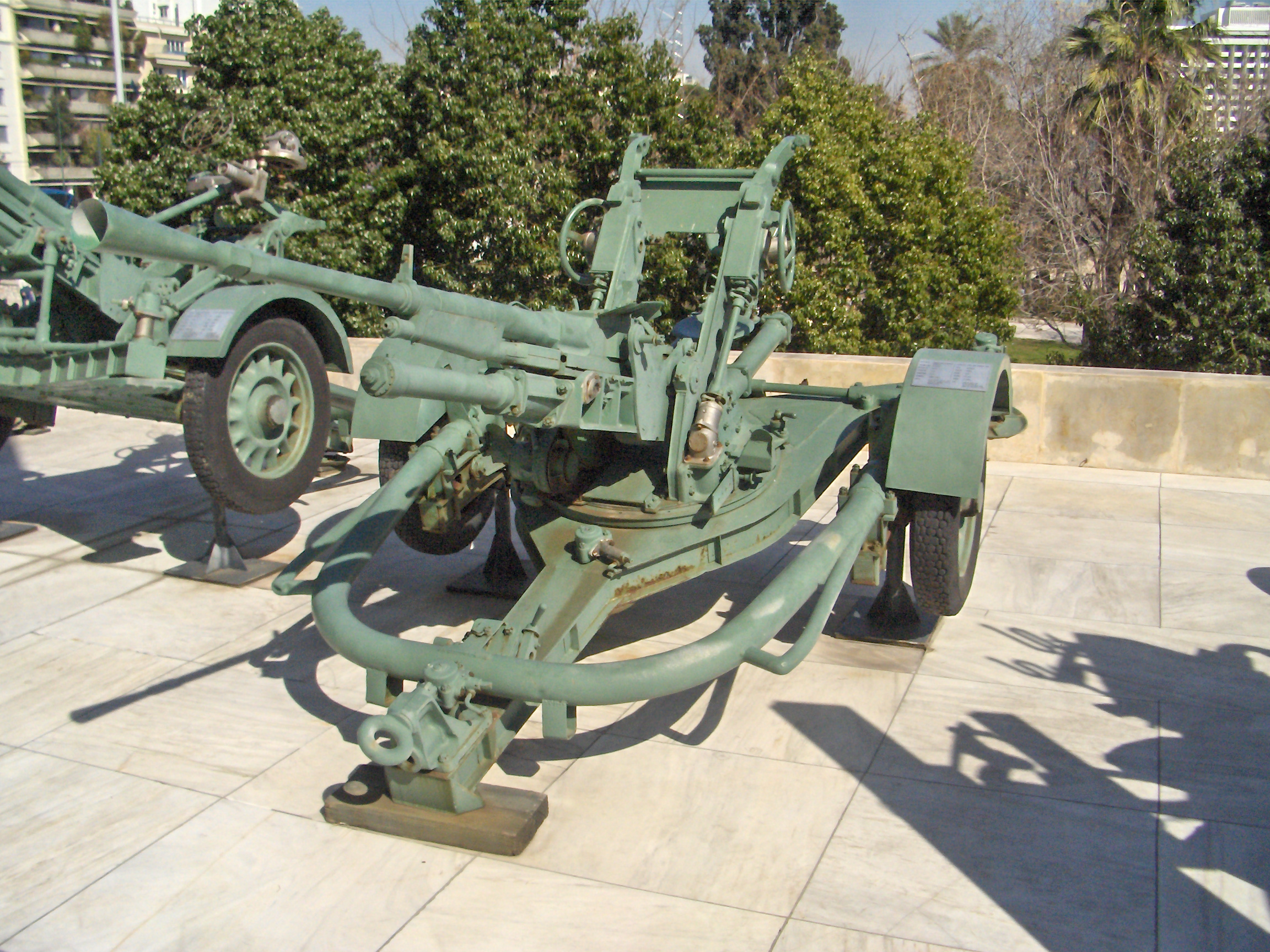
- Hotchkiss 25mm anti-aircraft gun. French Anti-Aircraft cannon used in small numbers in battle of France and used internationally. Not related to 25mm Hotchkiss anti-tank gun
  Darne machine gun
- Hotchkiss M1929 machine gun
- Oerlikon 20 mm cannon
- 25 mm Hotchkiss anti-aircraft gun
- Schneider 37 mm Mle 1930
- Canon anti-aérien de 75mm modèle 1939

== Artillery ==
- Canon d'Infanterie de 37 modèle 1916 TRP
- Lahitolle 95 mm cannon
- Canon Court de 105 M(montagne) modele 1909 Schneider
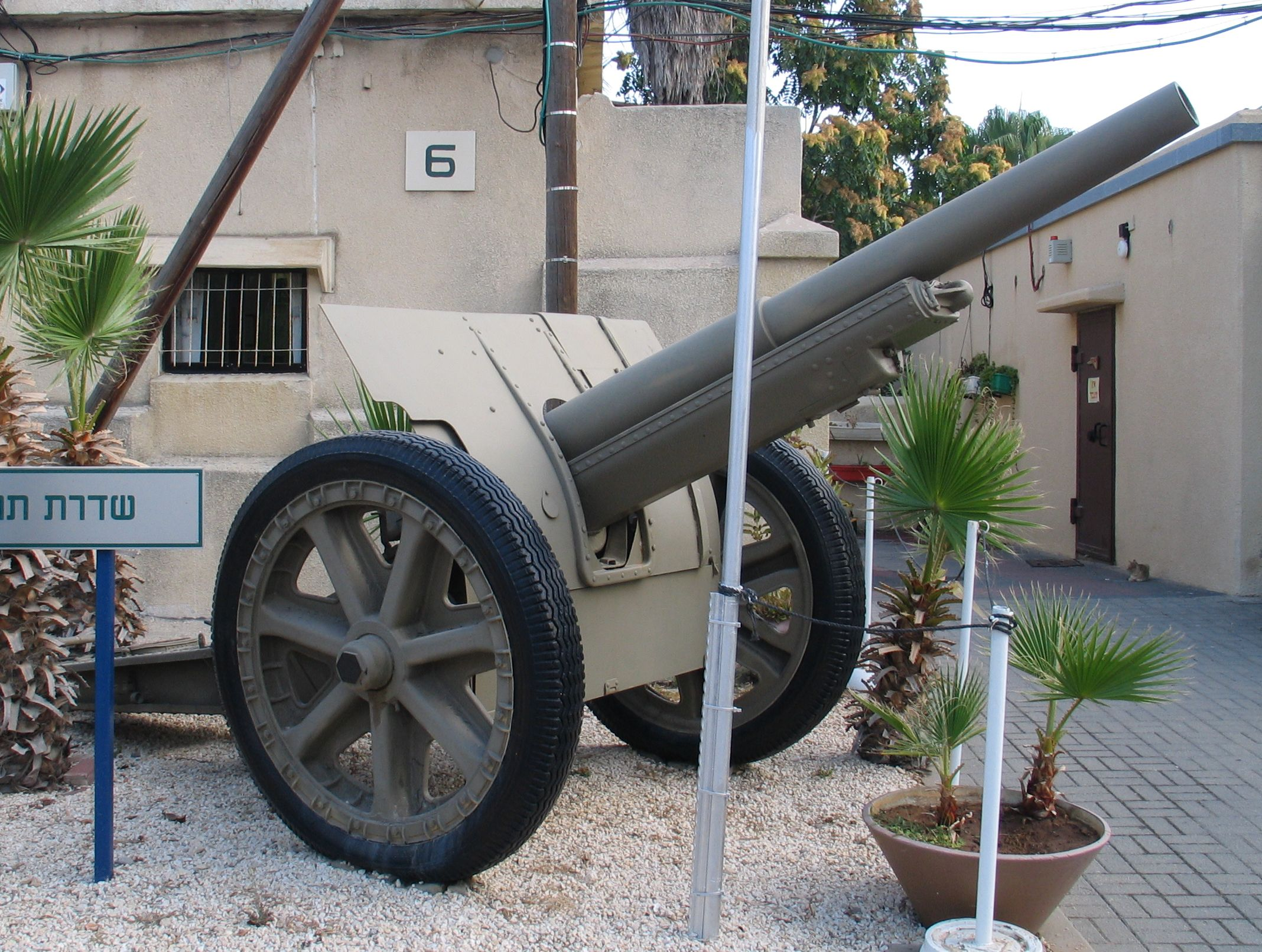
- Canon de 105 modèle 1913 Schneider. Most widely available light calibre artillery to French army in battle of France
  Canon Court de 105 M(montagne) modele 1919 Schneider
- Canon de 105 court mle 1934 Schneider
- Canon de 105 court mle 1935 B
- Canon de 105 L mle 1936 Schneider
- Canon de 105 mle 1913 Schneider
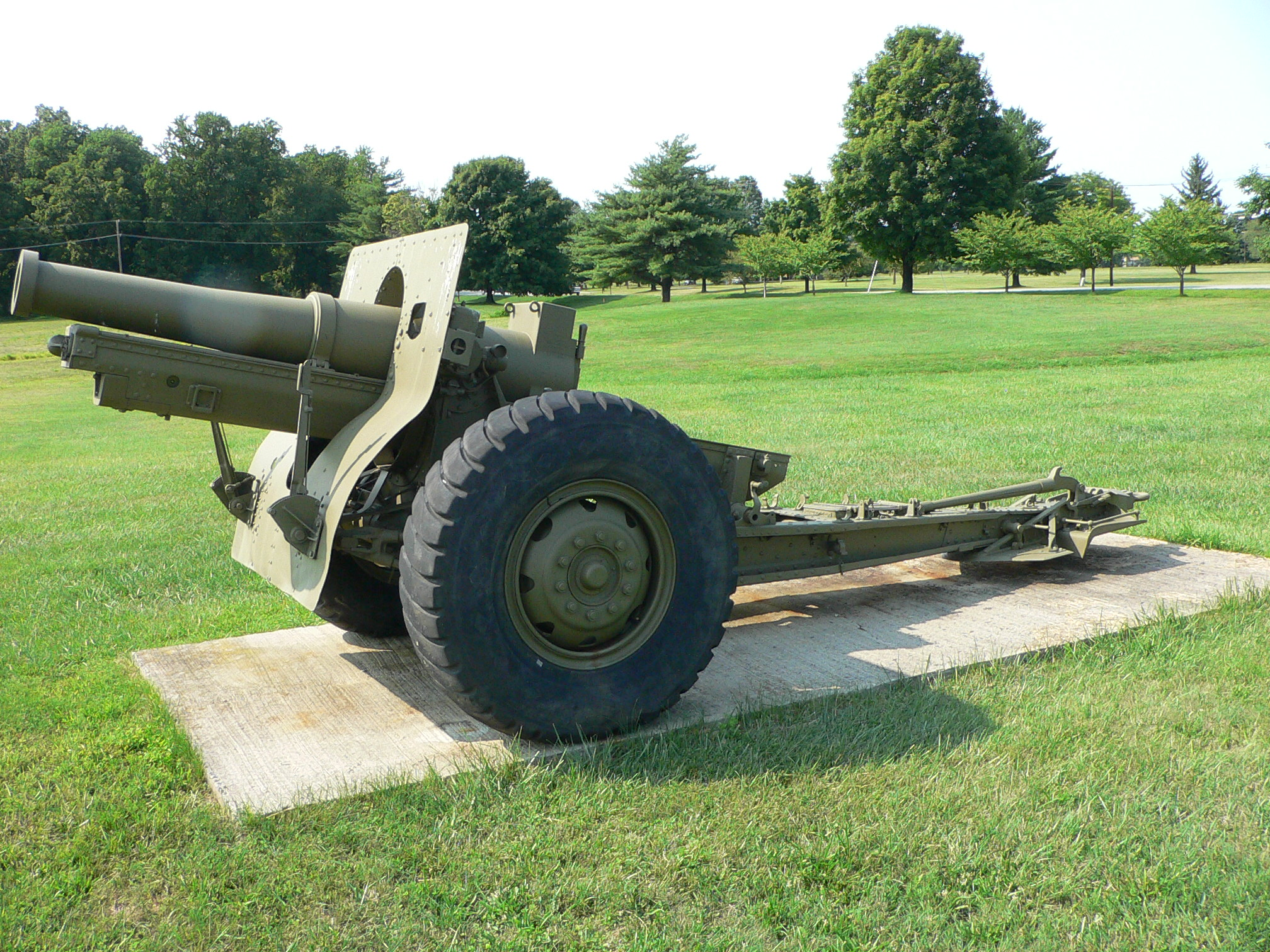
- Canon de 155 C modèle 1917 Schneider. Most widely available heavy calibre artillery to France during Battle of France
  Canon de 155 C modèle 1915 St. Chamond
- Canon de 155 C modèle 1917 Schneider
- Canon de 155mm GPF
- Canon de 194 mle GPF
- Canon de 65 M (montagne) modele 1906
- Canon de 75 M(montagne) modele 1919 Schneider
- Canon de 75 M(montagne) modele 1928
- Canon de 75 modèle 1897
- Mortier de 280 modèle 1914 Schneider

== Grenades and mines ==
- F1 grenade (France)

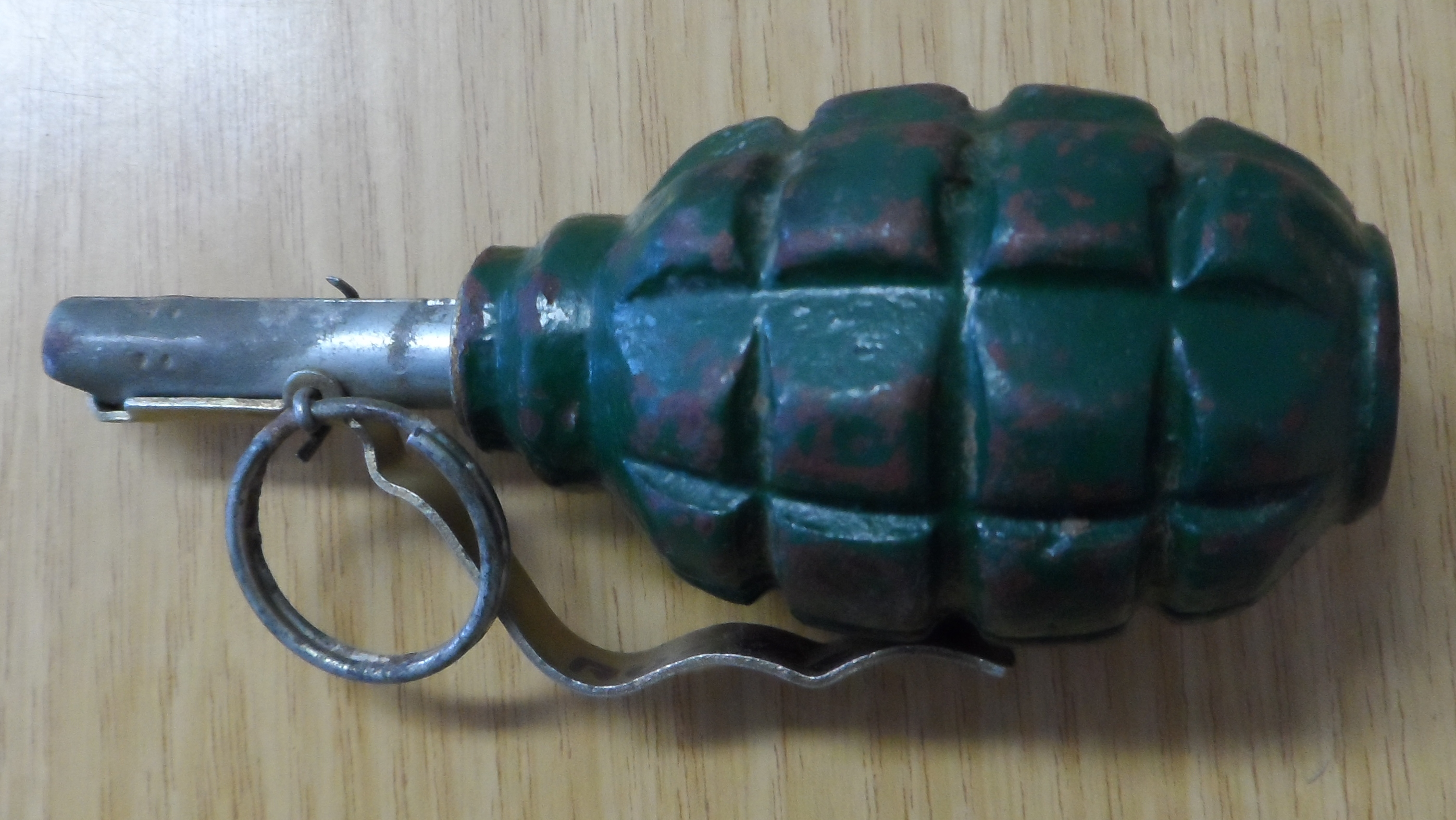
F1 hand grenade. Main grenade of France during Battle of France made during World War I. Modifiable with percussion or timed fused

- Modèle 1939 (mine)
- VB rifle grenade
- Mk 2 grenade (Lend-Lease to Free French forces)

== Mortars ==
- Brandt Mle 1935
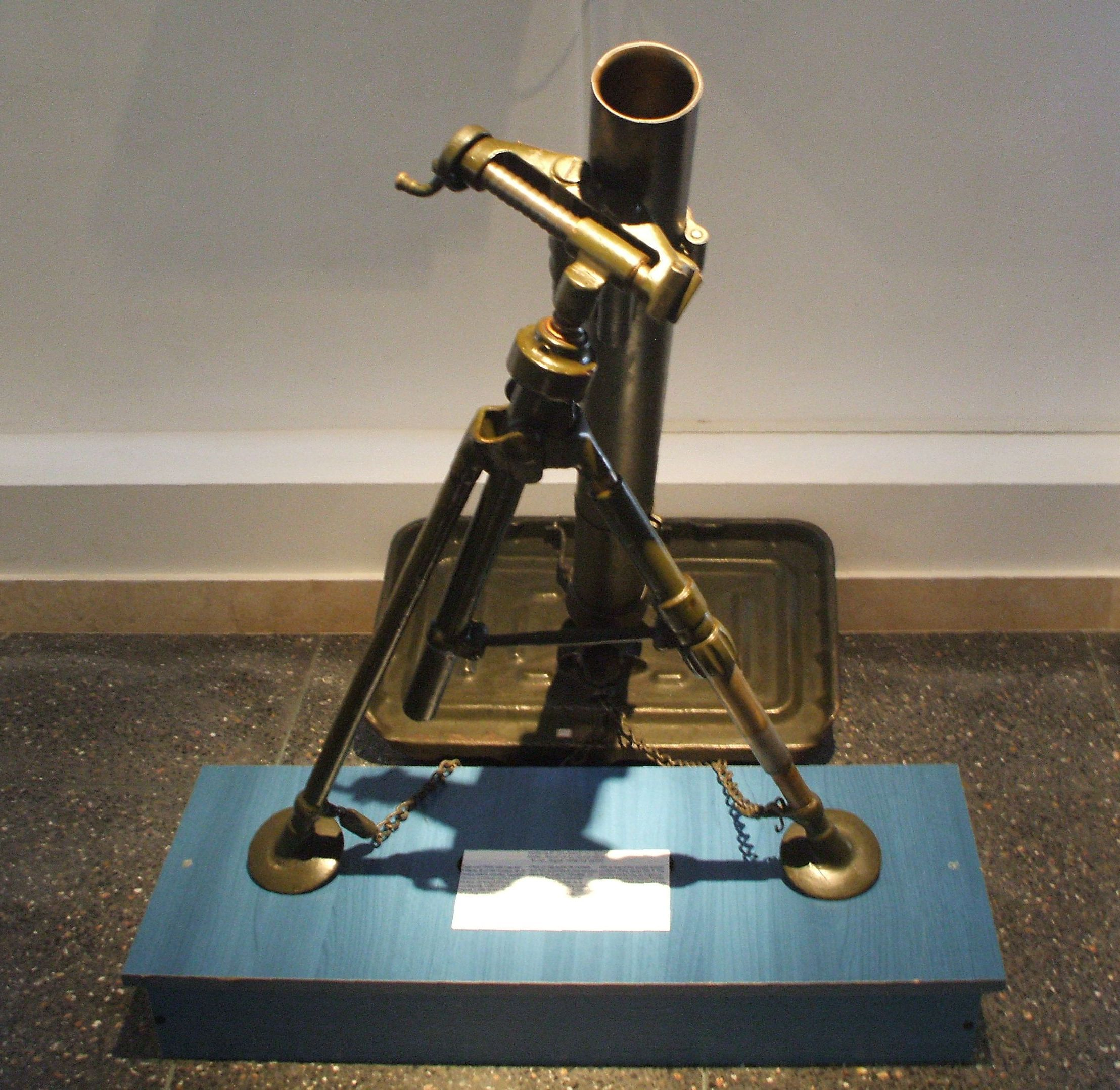
- Brandt modèle 27/31 mortar.Main mortar of French forces in World war II alongside the brandt modèle 35 which were both produced in their thousands before German occupation of France in 1940
  Brandt mle 27/31
- Lance Grenades de 50 mm modèle 37
- Mortier de 150 mm T Mle 1917 Fabry

== Armoured vehicles ==
Armoured cars

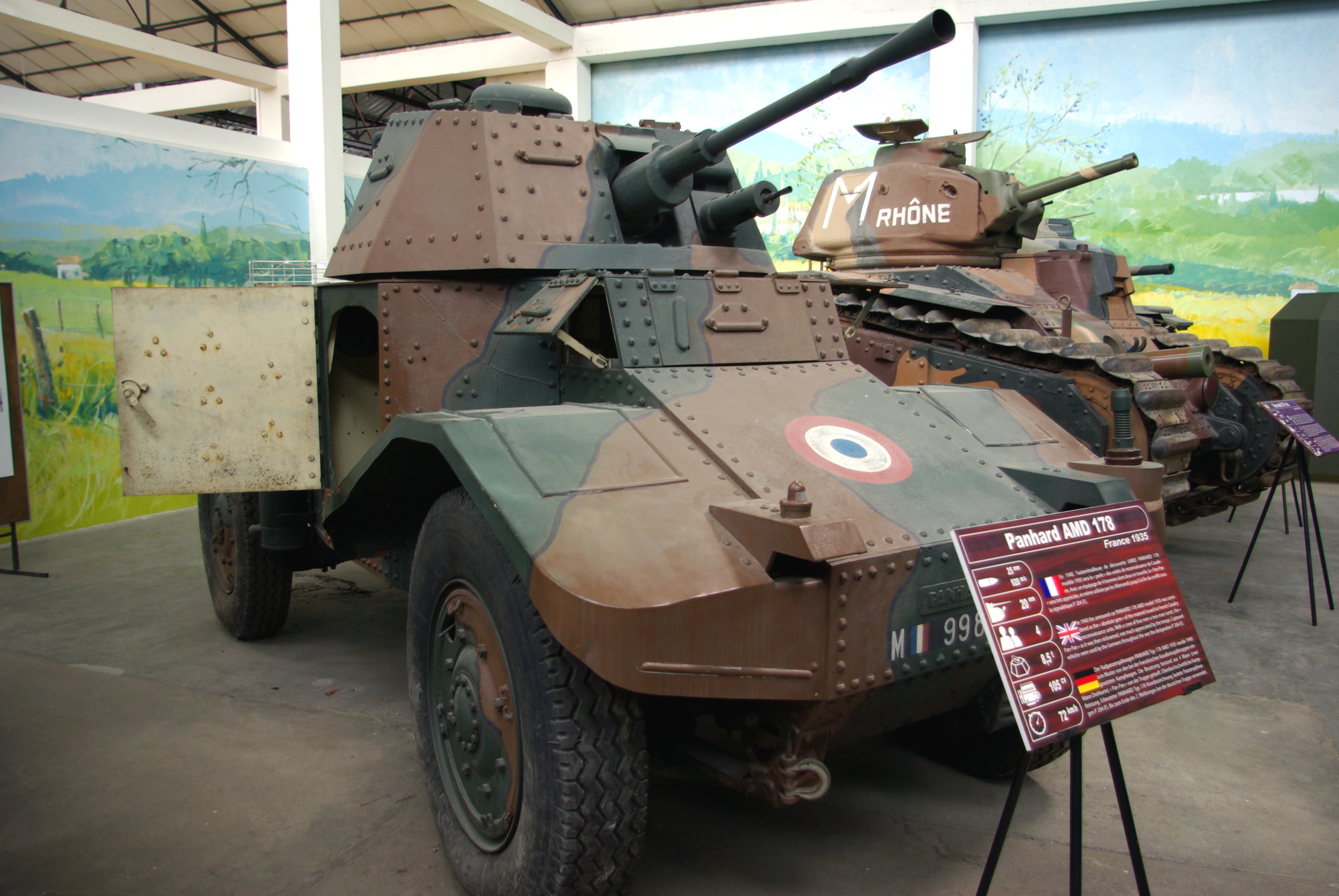
- Panhard 178 which was the main French armoured car during Battle of France that was built to be a reconnaissance vehicle
  AM Gendron SOMUA 39
- AMC Schneider P 16
- AMD Laffly 80AM
- AMD Panhard 165
- AMDL Panhard
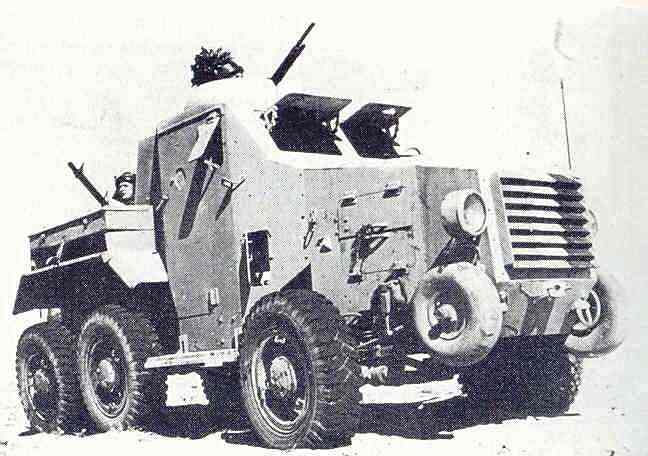
- Laffly S15 TOE (théâtre d'opérations extérieures: "overseas theatre of operations") used by French forces in North Africa. Used by Free French forces in the Capture of Kufra
  Berliet VUDB
- Berliet VUDB4
- Citroen-Kegresse M23
- Laffly S15 TOE
- Laffly 50AM
- Panhard 178

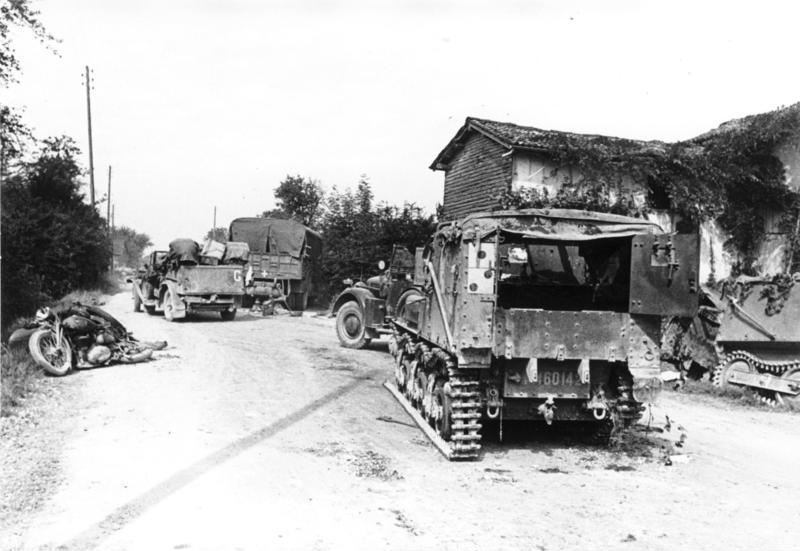
Rear view of Lorraine 38L armoured personnel carrier. Was created from the Lorraine 37L armoured tank supply vehicle. Only armoured personnel carrier in battle of France

Armoured personnel carriers

Armoured personnel carriers

- Lorraine 37L \ 38L

=== Armoured utility vehicles ===
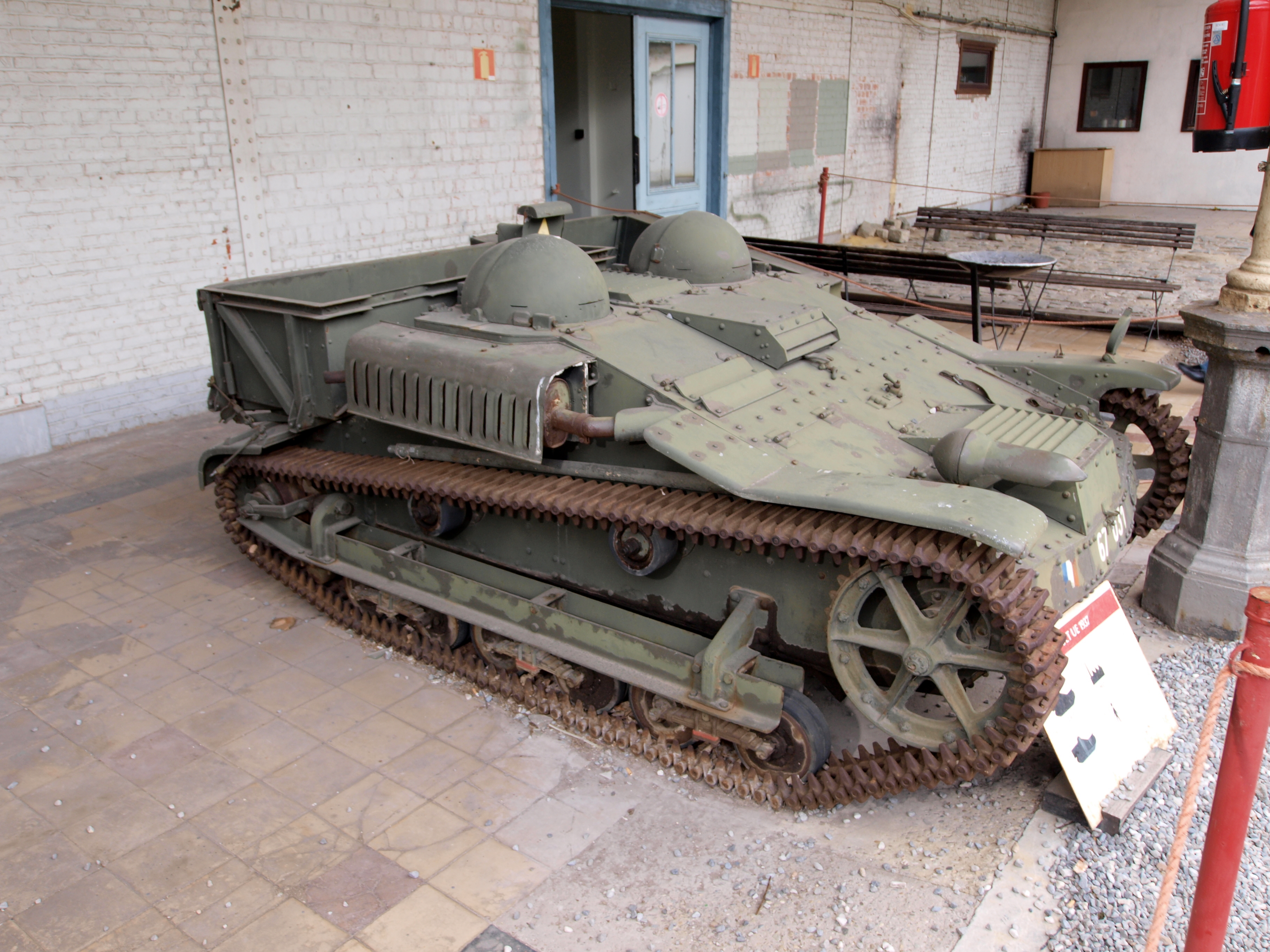
- Renault UE armoured supply vehicle. Helped transport weapons and ammunition for the infantry.
  Renault UE Chenillette
- Lorraine 37L

=== Tanks ===
Light tanks

- AMR 33
- AMR 35
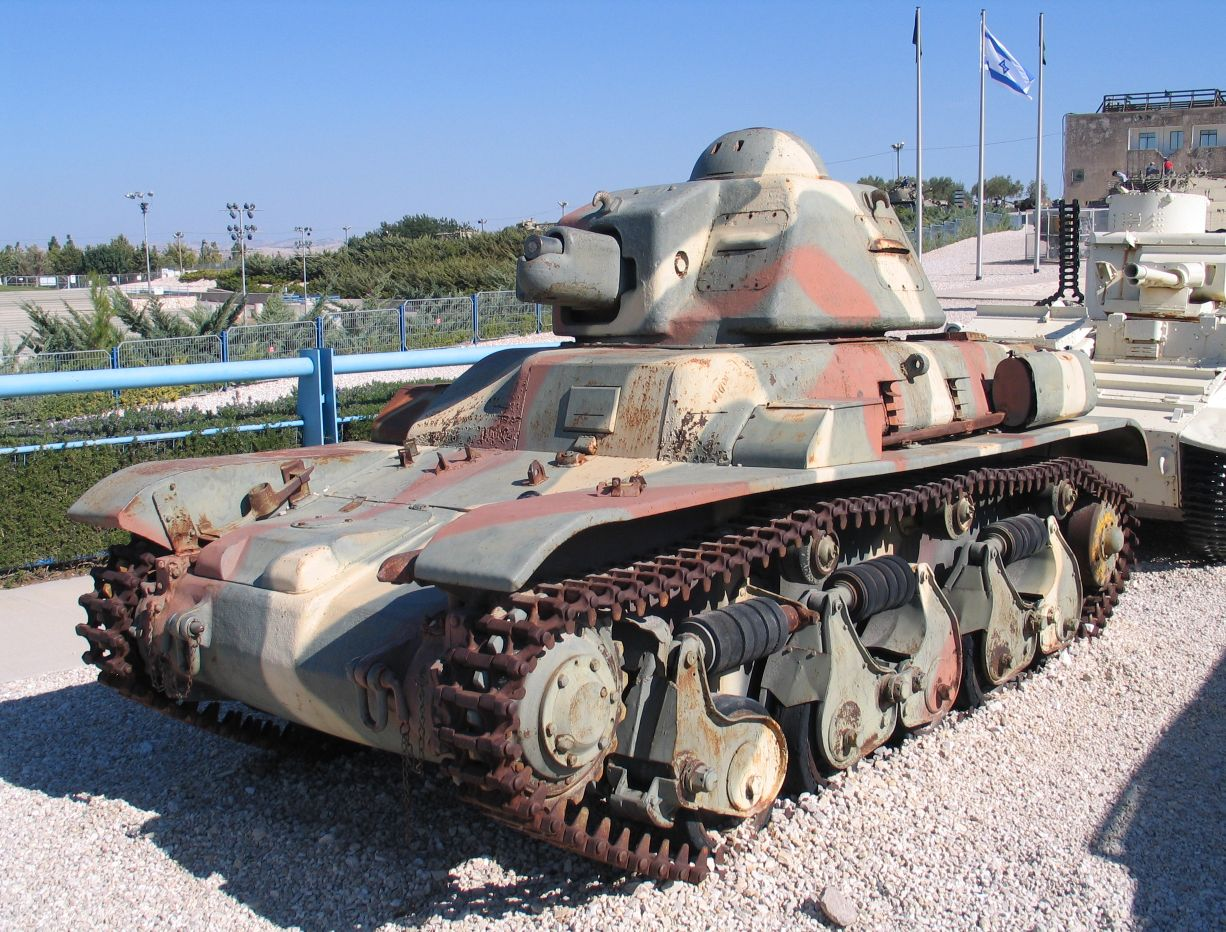
- Renault R-35 infantry light tank. Most numerous French tank of World war II
  FCM 36
- Hotchkiss H35, and derived variants
- Renault FT
- Renault R-35
- Renault R-40
- Char D1

Medium tanks

- Char D2

Cavalry tanks

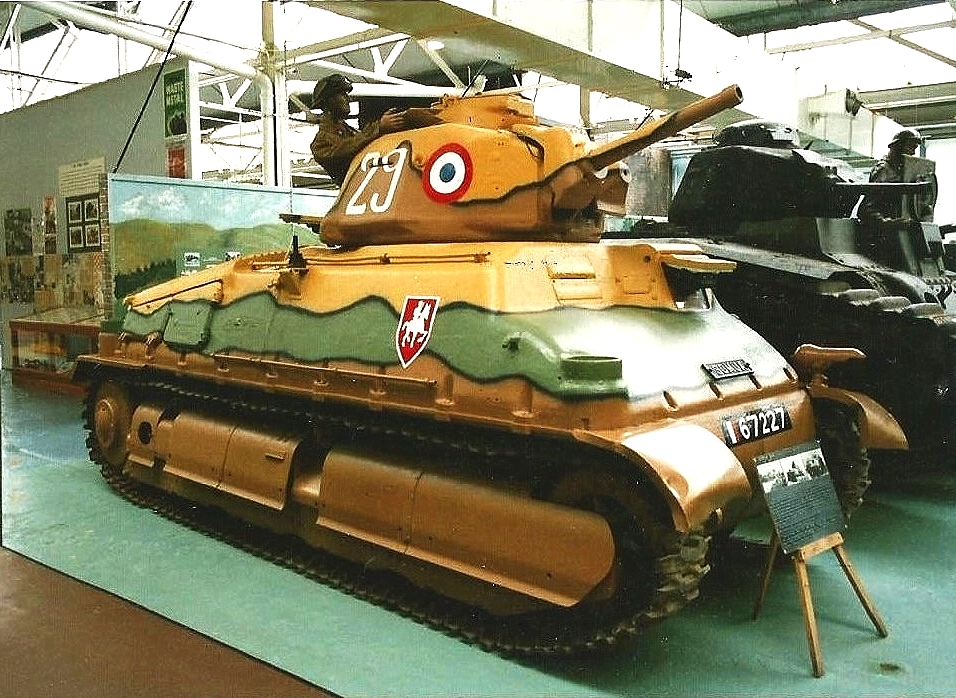
- SOMUA S-35.One of the best tanks of its time in armour and firepower and outclassed German Tanks such as the Panzer III and IV in this respect. However overall they(Panzers) were better tanks as they granted far better vision, communication and ergonomics than French tanks which were mostly pretty bad in this regard due to things like a one man turret crew.
  SOMUA S35
- Char G1 (Prototype)

Armoured combat tanks

- AMC 34
- AMC 35

Heavy tanks

- Char B1
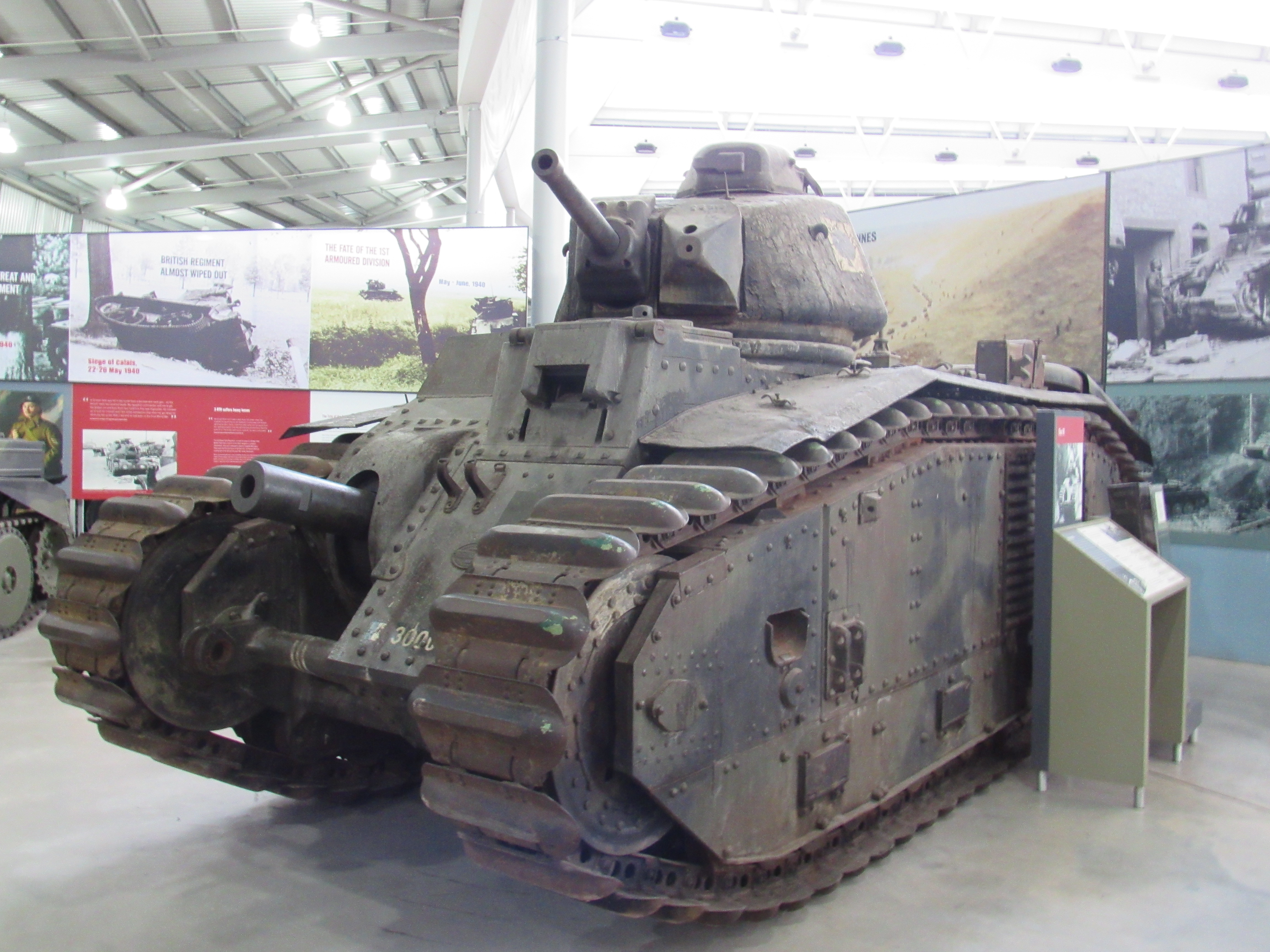
  Char B1 bis variant. Originally the Char B1 was conceived as breakthrough tank using its Hull mounted gun to attack fortifications. Eventually became a Char de Bataille or battle tank that was meant to take on enemy armour. Heavily armoured and armed for its day and was impenetrable to ordinary German Anti-tank Guns.
- Char 2C

== See also ==
- List of French World War II military equipment
