= List of French military equipment of World War II =

== Uniforms and Protective equipment ==
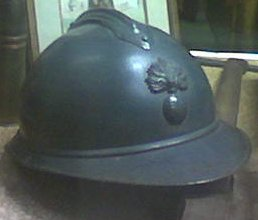
- Adrian helmet used by French troops in both World Wars.
  Adrian helmet
- Brodie helmet (Used by Free French forces during the North African campaign)
- British Battledress (Supplied by the British)
- Puttee (A wool cloth for wrapping around the ankle used by French infantry)
- Gaiters (British-supplied P37 canvas gaiters used by the Free French forces)
- M1938 wool tunic (Vareuse Mle 1938)
- M1938 wool overcoat (Capote Mle 1938) (Standard-issue double-breasted winter greatcoat used by French soldiers)
- M1939 overcoat (Supplied by the Americans to Free French forces)
- M1 helmet (Lend-Lease to Free French forces)
- M1935 tanker helmet (Casque de char Mle 1935) - A modified Adrian helmet used for French tankers
- M1938 tanker helmet (Supplied by US and used by French tankers)
- A.N.P. Mle.1931 (An upgraded version of the ARS gas mask)

== Footwear ==
- Ammunition boot (Supplied by the British to Free French forces)
- M1944 Shoepac (Supplied by US to Free French forcess)
- Brodequins Mle 17 (worn by French soldiers)
- Brodequins Mle 19 (worn by French officers)
- Brodequins Mle 41 (Upgraded lacing system and used by Vichy French soldiers)

== Web gear ==
- 1937 pattern web equipment (Supplied by the British to Free French forces)
- Équipement modèle 1935 (Leather webbing for carrying rifle ammo)
- M1923 Cartridge Belt (Lend-Lease to Free French forces)
- M1936 Pistol Belt (Lend-Lease web belts used to mount SMG pouch and holsters)
- Thompson 5-cell magazine pouch (Lend-Lease pouch used to mount to the M1936 pistol belt)

== Weapons ==
- List of World War II weapons of France

== Utility vehicles ==
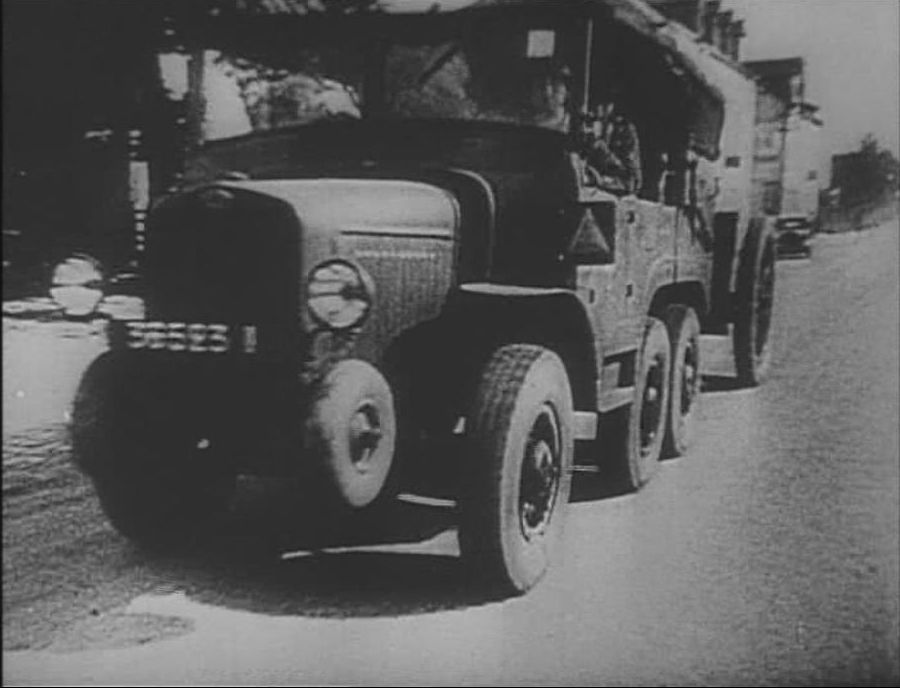
- Laffly S15T light artillery tractor of Laffly S15 utility vehicle family. For use of this family of vehicles see Free French Capture of Kufra.
  P107
- Laffly S15
- Laffly V15
- SOMUA MCG
- Citroën U23
- Renault AGx

== Maginot Line ==
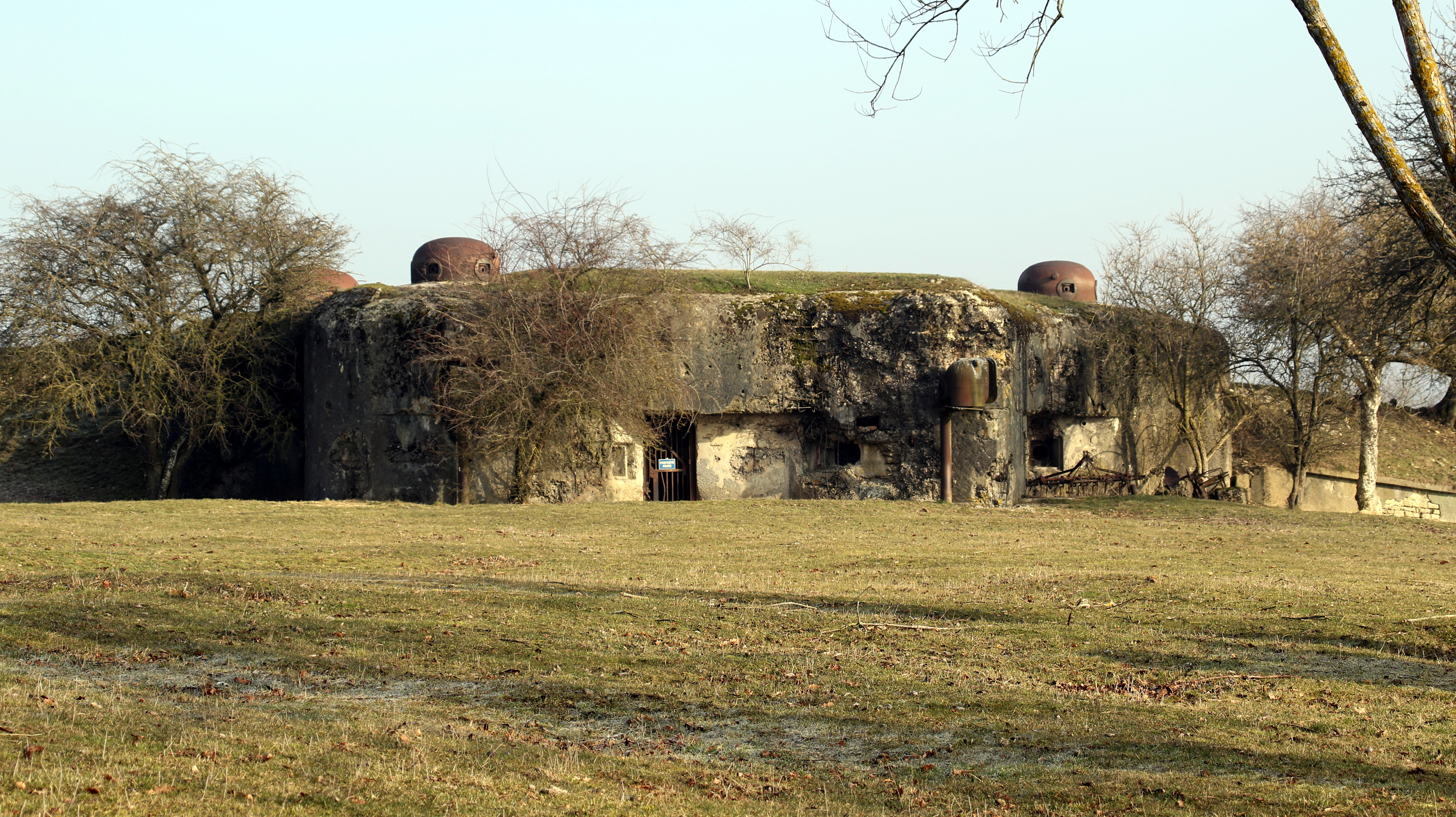
Maginot Line Casemate at Nord-Ouest d, Achen

- Maginot Line

== Aircraft ==
- List of aircraft of the French Air Force during World War II

== Ships ==
- List of Classes of French ships of World War II
