= V15 =

V15 may refer to:

- Bell XV-15, an American experimental tiltrotor aircraft
- DR Class V 15, a German diesel locomotive
- Laffly V15, a French artillery tractor
- Vanguard 15, an American sailing dinghy
- V15, a grade in bouldering
- V15, other personal history presenting hazards to health, in the ICD-9 V codes
- V-15, a Shure phonograph cartridge
