= Laffly S20 =

French truck used in WW2

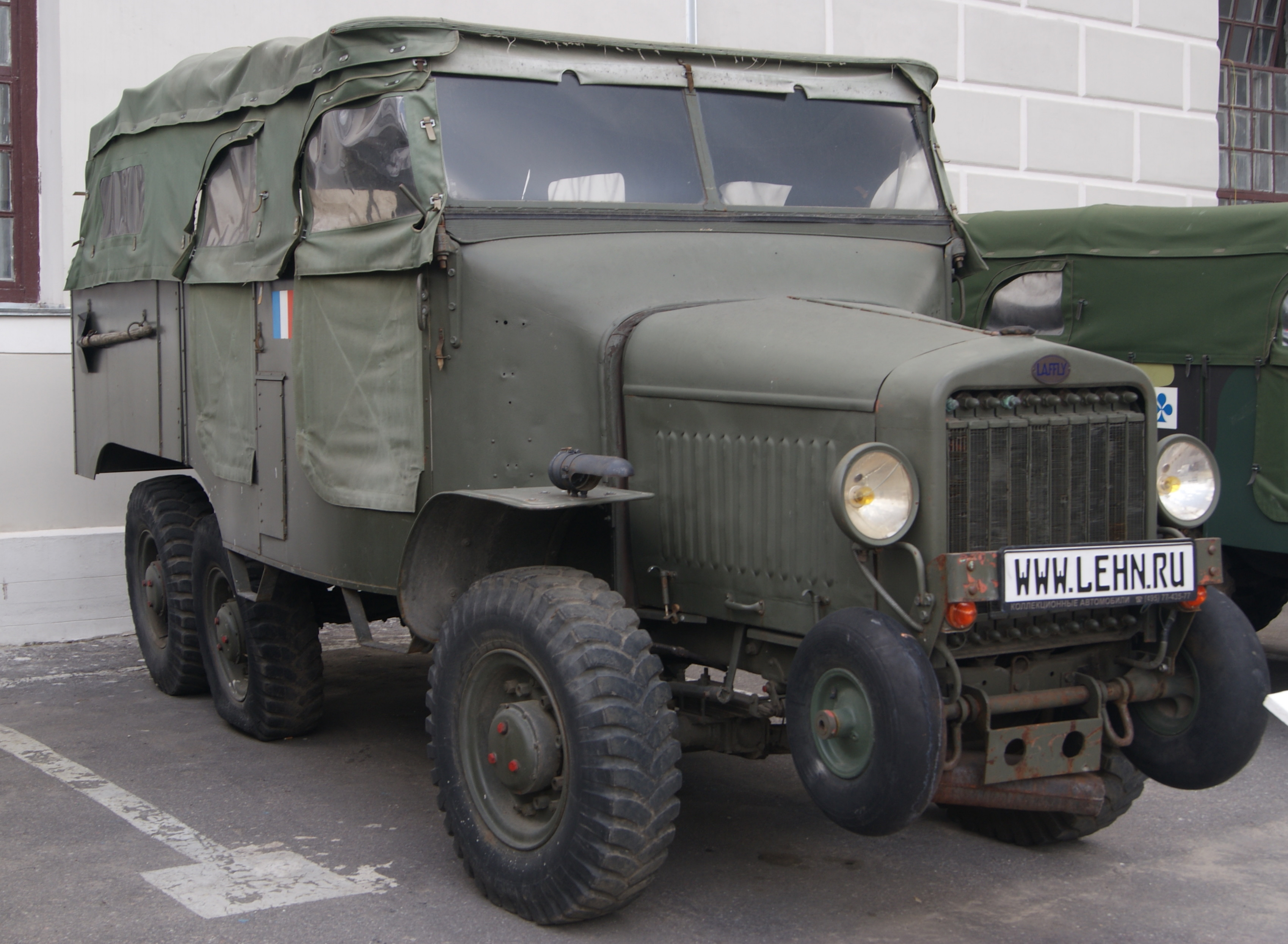
- Type: Troop carrier
- Place of origin: France

Service history
- Used by: France, French West Africa
- Wars: Second World War

Production history
- Designer: Laffly
- Designed: 1935
- No. built: 630
- Variants: S20 Colonial, S20 Fuel Carrier, S20 Command Car

Specifications
- Mass: 3,900 kg
- Length: 5.35 m
- Width: 2 m
- Height: 2 m (uncovered) - 2.45 m (covered)
- Passengers: 10
- Armor: None
- Engine: 68 hp @ 3,200 RPM
- Maximum speed: 65 kph

The Laffly S20 TL (French: TL - tracteur, chassis long) was a 6x6 truck developed by French vehicle manufacturer Laffly in 1935. It was built to serve as a troop carrier for the dragoon regiment of Cavalry's Light Mechanised Division (DLM). The first 140 units were delivered to the DLM in 1937.

The S20 could carry up to ten riflemen and two light machine guns, a ten-man heavy machine gun crew, a seven-man 81mm mortar crew, a seven-man 60mm mortar crew, or an eight-man 25mm anti-tank gun crew.

== Anti-tank usage ==
The anti-tank crew would typically use a 25mm Hotchkiss SA-L 34 L/72 anti-tank gun. The gun proved too fragile for towing, but could be mounted on the truck in a forward or backward position, with the windshield needing to be lowered when the gun was facing forward. Around 40 special S20s were produced with a split windshield to allow for the driver to keep his windshield up while the other section was lowered for the gun to protrude out the front. These 40 units would be delivered during the period of the Phoney War.
