= Laffly =

Defunct French vehicle manufacturer

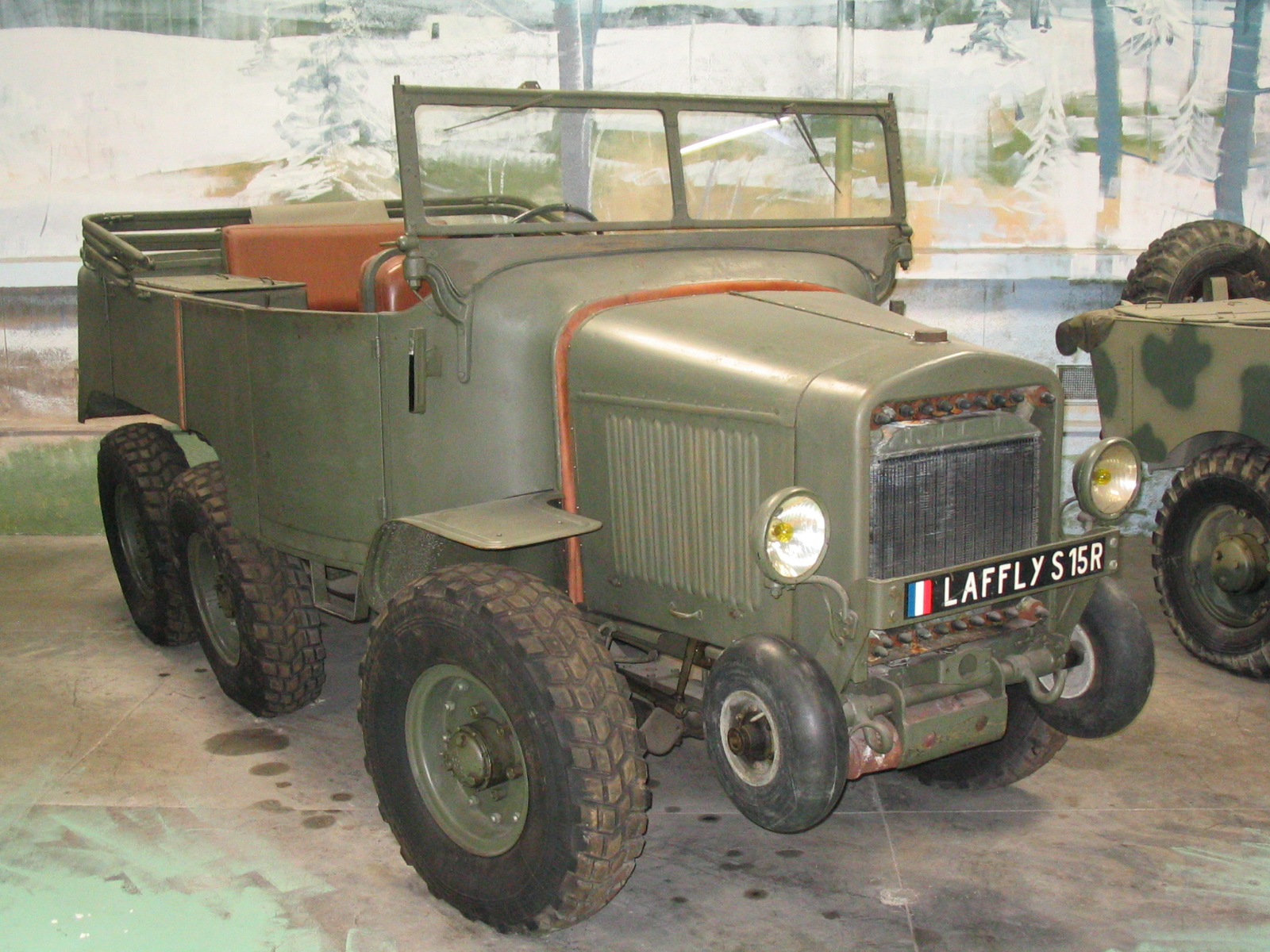
Laffly S15R Saumur reconnaissance vehicle

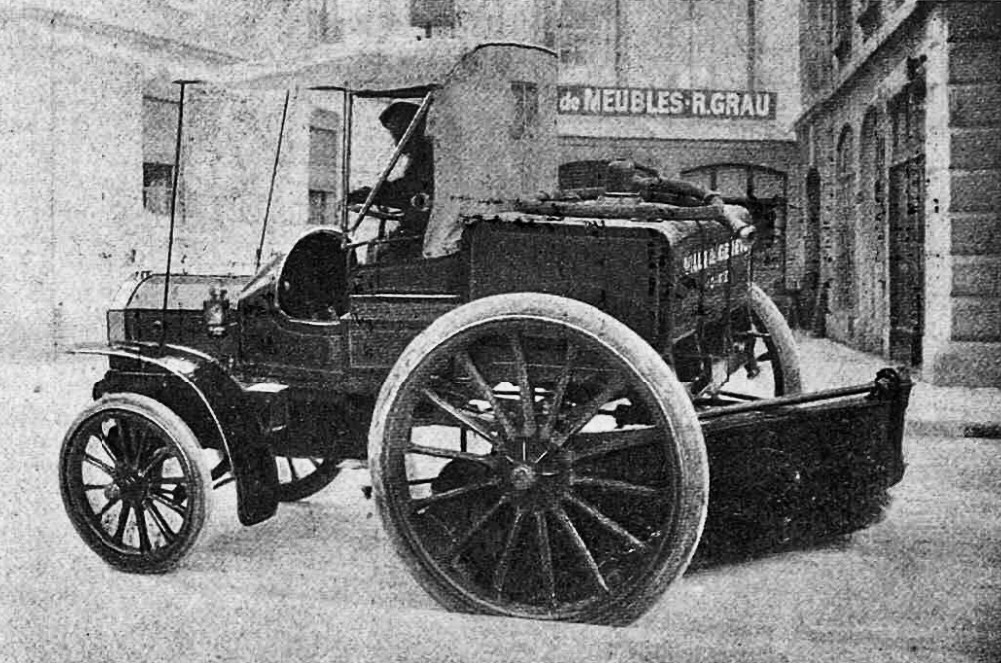
Laffly street sweeper (1916)

Laffly was a French manufacturer of trucks and utility vehicles. Founded in 1849, the Laffly company began manufacturing utility vehicles in Billancourt in 1912. From the mid-1930s until World War II, the company also manufactured a range of offroad military vehicles such as the Laffly S15, Laffly V15, and Laffly S20.

Probably best remembered today for its firetrucks, the Laffly company closed shop during the early 1950s.

== Sources ==
- https://web.archive.org/web/20070407141804/http://www.bernistrucks.fr/actualite/actu_0305.php
