= Laffly S15 =

French gun tractor used during World War II

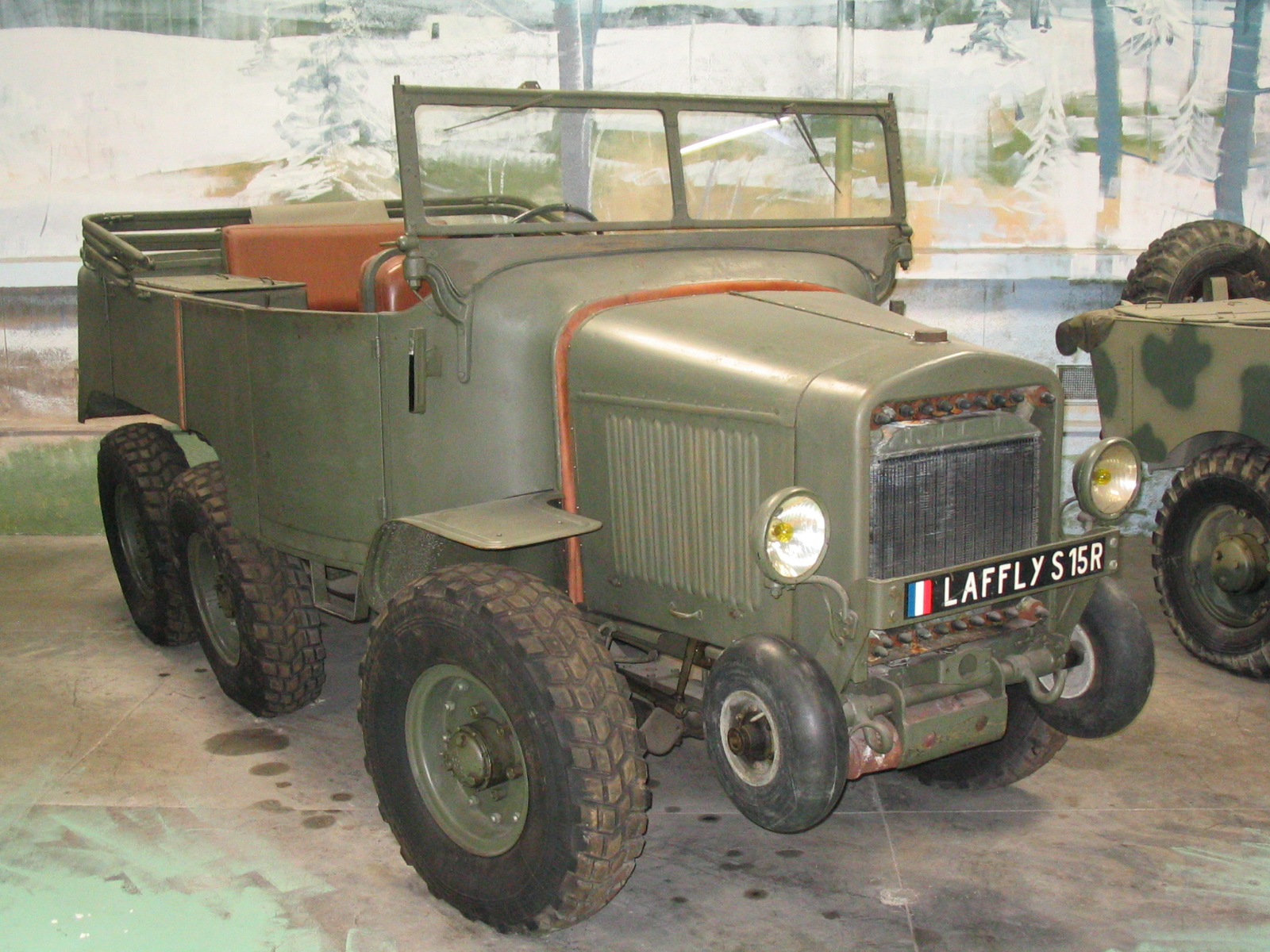
- S15R on display at Musée des Blindés.
- Type: Gun tractor
- Place of origin: France

Specifications (S15T)
- Mass: 2.85 tonnes (6,300 lb)
- Length: 4.64 m (15 ft 3 in)
- Width: 1.85 m (6 ft 1 in)
- Height: 2.15 m (7 ft 1 in)
- Crew: 2 + 3 passengers
- Armor: none
- Engine: 4-cylinder, petrol, 2300 cc 55 hp
- Payload capacity: 800 kg (1,800 lb)
- Suspension: front: coil springs, rear: leaf springs, independent wheels
- Maximum speed: 72 km/h (45 mph)

The Laffly S15 was a family of all-terrain military vehicles from French manufacturer Laffly that shared the same six-wheel drive chassis. They were used by French forces during World War II.

== Development ==
In the mid-1920s the French Army began to seek an all-terrain liaison car (voiture de liaison tous-terrains, VLTT) to replace or supplement the half-track Citroën Kégresse, which was not fully-satisfactory in this role due to its lower speed compared to conventional wheeled designs. In February 1925 Berliet, Delahaye, and Renault all submitted six-wheeled designs for trials held at Satory, but none of the designs were found to meet the army’s requirements, and the Citroën Kégresse was retained as the least-bad option. As a stop-gap measure, between 1929 and 1931 the army placed several small orders for 4-wheeled Berliet designs for motorized and artillery units, while half-tracks were retained for tank units.

Laffly had opened its truck division in the 1920s, and had made inroads with the army, supplying the LC2 light truck which proved highly satisfactory in service in North Africa. In June 1934 Laffly created its first six-wheeled design, the S 35 C, though initially with only the four rear wheels motorized. This design was revised by October, with the front wheels now powered through the use of the Tracta constant-velocity joint, and became the S 35 T. That month the design was trialed at Vincennes against the Lorraine type 72. The Laffly design was found to slightly better terrain handling and slightly higher speed, due to its more powerful 55 horsepower motor, but had somewhat worse fuel economy.

In 1935 the new chassis was presented by Laffly as an adaptable platform that could meet all the army’s all-terrain vehicle needs. Development of the platform led down two branches based on the same platform: the S 15 R developed for reconnaissance, and S 15 T, intended for gun-towing and cargo-hauling, were both six-wheel-drive platforms, while the S 15 C (ambulance) and S 15 L (wireless telephone) vehicles, intended for the French air force, only had power in the four rear wheels, and were thus referred to as Véhicules tous chemins, rated for all road conditions, rather than tous terrains, rated for off-road use.

In summer of 1936 the French army issued updated standards for the VLTT, it sought a six-wheeled vehicle with room for six passengers, a motor of minimum 50 horsepower, and a maximum speed of at least 75 km/h, intended for use in reconnaissance missions. The S 15 R was essentially the only French vehicle of the time that met the requirements, owing to the Lorraine 72’s unsatisfactory speed of 59 km/h and insufficient transport capacity.

== Variants ==
- The Laffly S15T was a light artillery tractor that was used to tow light field artillery pieces such as modernized variants of the 75 mm mle 1897 field gun and Canon de 105 court mle 1935 B howitzer.
- A personnel carrier and reconnaissance vehicle based on the same chassis was designated as Laffly S15R. It had a different, lighter rear cab and a different transmission that allowed for higher road speed.
- The Laffly S15TOE (théâtre d'opérations extérieures: "overseas theatre of operations") was a scout car designed and built for service in French African colonies. The S15 chassis was preserved, but an armoured cabin protected the engine and crew, with a small turret that was armed with a single Reibel machine gun.
- The Laffly W15T was a low-profile version of the S15T. It was made by Hotchkiss and was used to tow the 47 mm Model 1931 anti-tank gun.
- The ambulance version was named S15C.
- W-15 TCC (Chasseur de char, "tank hunter") - self-propelled 47mm SA mle 1937 anti-tank gun produced in haste in mid-1940.

== Adoption and French Army Use ==
After the S 15 was adopted by the French army, each motorized infantry regiment was to receive 7 S 15 Rs, three for the regimental headquarters, one for the regimental heavy weapons company, and one for each infantry battalion. Each light tank battalion was to receive six, and Char B1 bis heavy tank battalions were to receive seven. Most of these delivery targets were achieved by the time of the German invasion in May 1940, though certain tank battalions still retained the obsolete Citroën Kégresse P 19 half-track instead due to production delays. Among cavalry units one vehicle was to be issued per squadron, though in 1939 it was already noted that for the motorized dragoon regiments, whose transports were already capable of speeds exceeding 60 km/h, the S 15 R’s speed only provided marginal benefit in its intended role.

Among artillery regiments the number of S 15s varied. The 71st and 78th Artillery Regiments (Régiments d'artillerie, RA), whose batteries were attached to the motorized cavalry divisions, and the 14 motorized artillery regiments attached to the motorized infantry divisions received 8 VLTTs per group, and 3 more at the regimental level, for a total of 27 S 15 Rs. These motorized artillery regiments were equipped with 37 light tractors per group, for a total of 115 per regiment; these could be S 15 Ts or Unic P107 halt-tracks; the 71e Régiment d'Artillerie à Tracteurs Tous Terrains (71e RATTT) was equipped with the S 15 T to tow its 105mm guns. The four all-terrain artillery regiments attached to the armored divisions 305e, 309e, 319e, and 322e RATTT were to have 19 VLTTs, with the same theoretical dotation for the corps-level motorized heavy artillery regiments 101e, 102e, 103e, 104e, 107e, 108e, 120e, 123e and 124e RALT.

A small number of S 15 Rs were intended for service with engineering units as well, while a handful were sent to colonial motorized units in Equatorial Africa and Indochina.

Production never allowed these plans to come fully to fruition; 1,317 S 15 R VLTTs were ordered by the army, but only 806 had been delivered by the outbreak of the war. Production numbers rose in the fall of 1939, with 1,059 delivered by the end of the year.

== Foreign Use ==
When France delivered 41 Renault R-35 tanks to Romania in 1939, a number of Laffly S15T artillery tractors were also delivered. These gun tractors were used by the 2nd Armoured Regiment's support services.

== Gallery ==
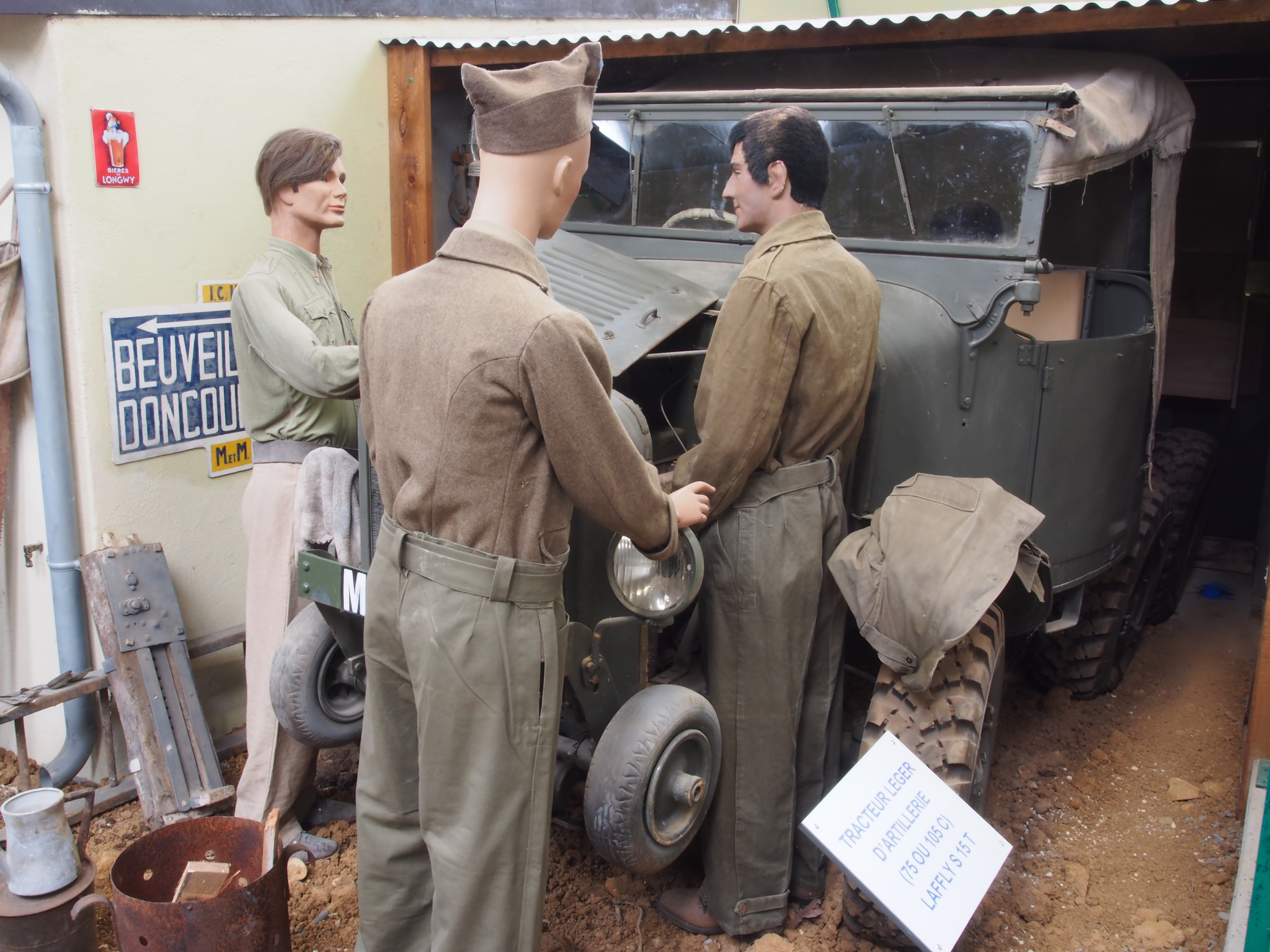
Laffly S15T in a museum

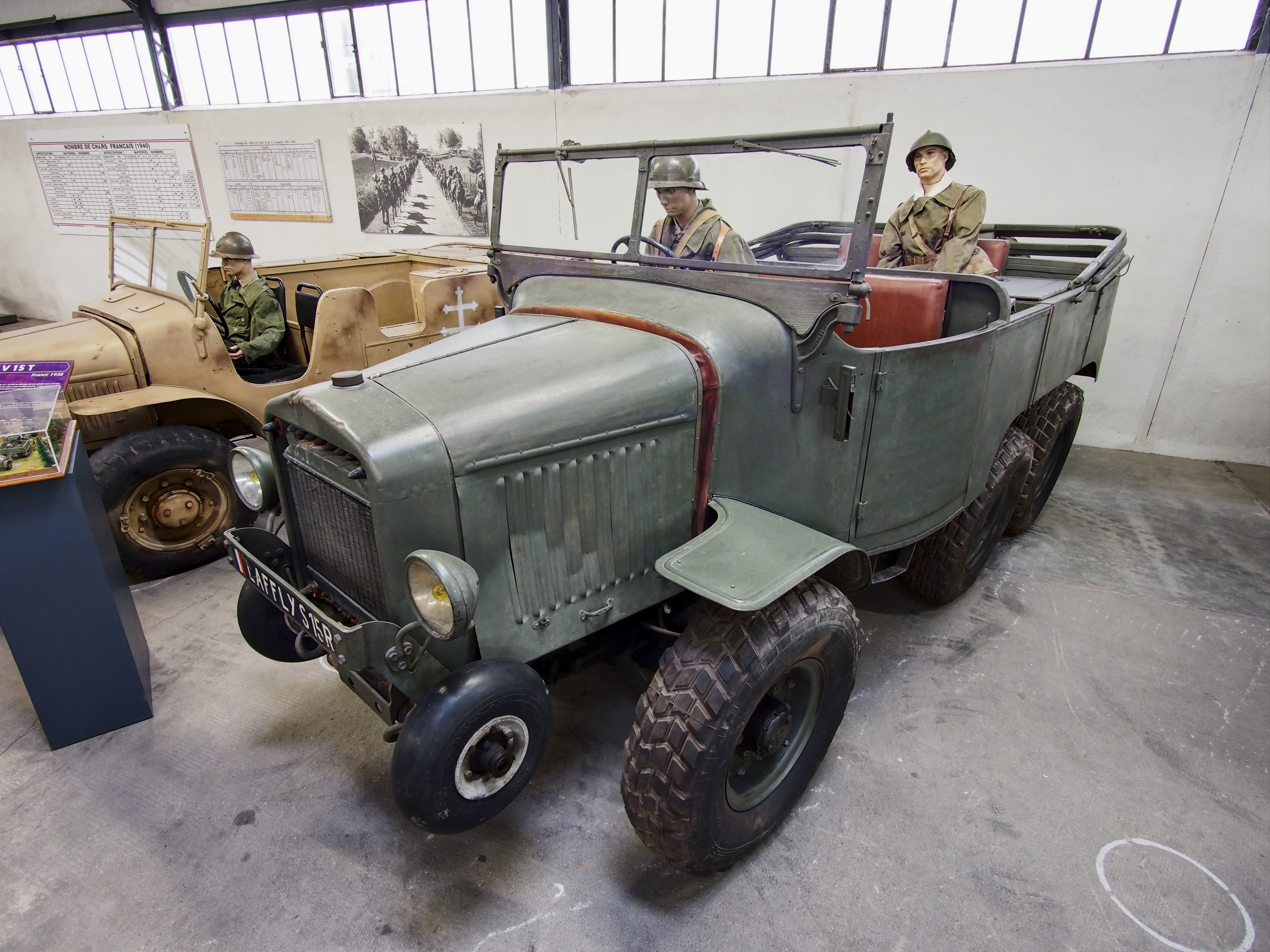
Laffly S15R front

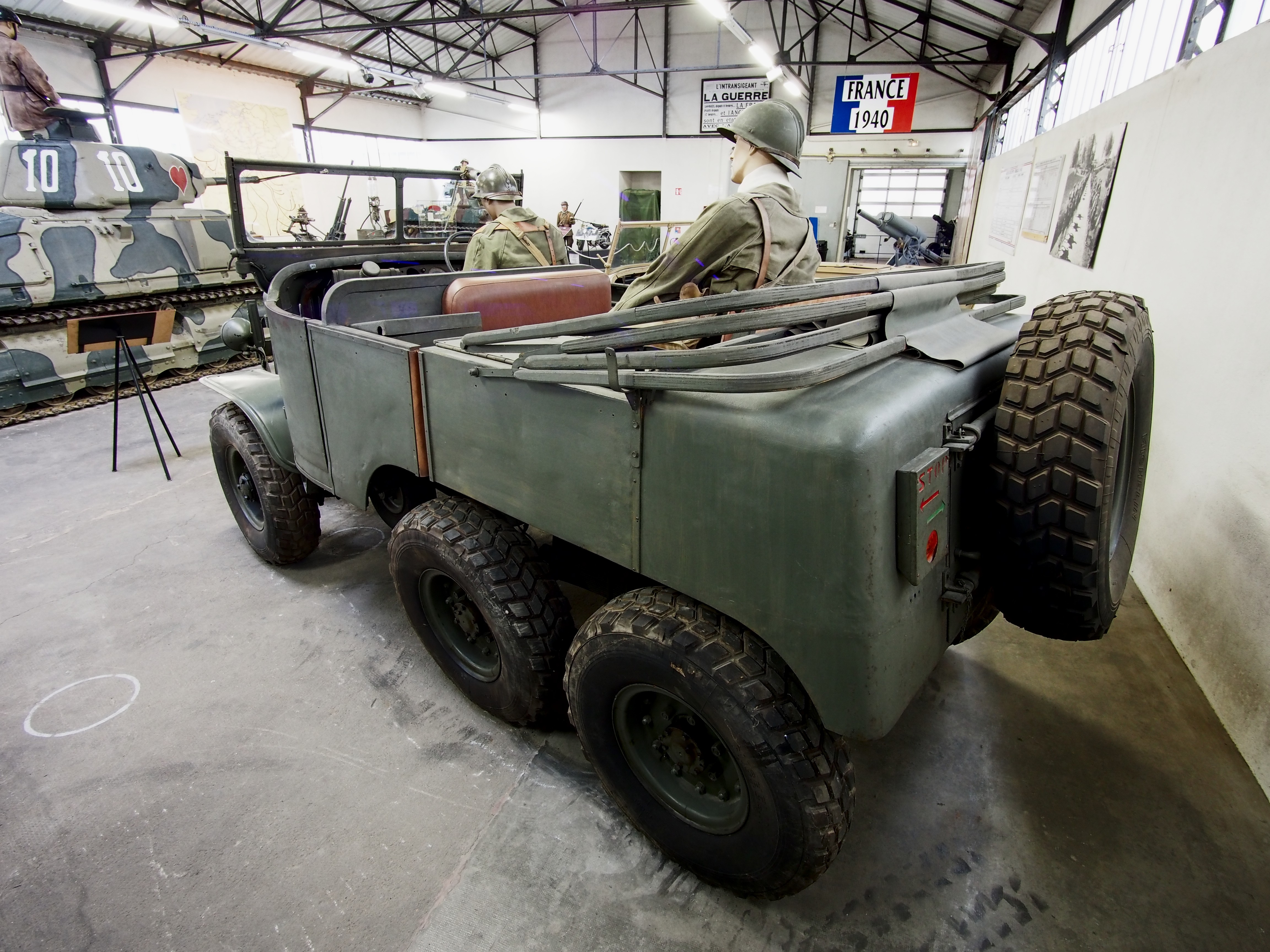
Laffly S15R back

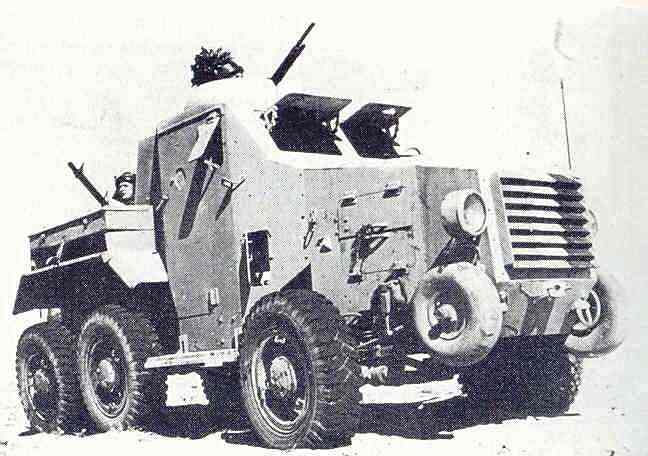
Laffly S15 TOE

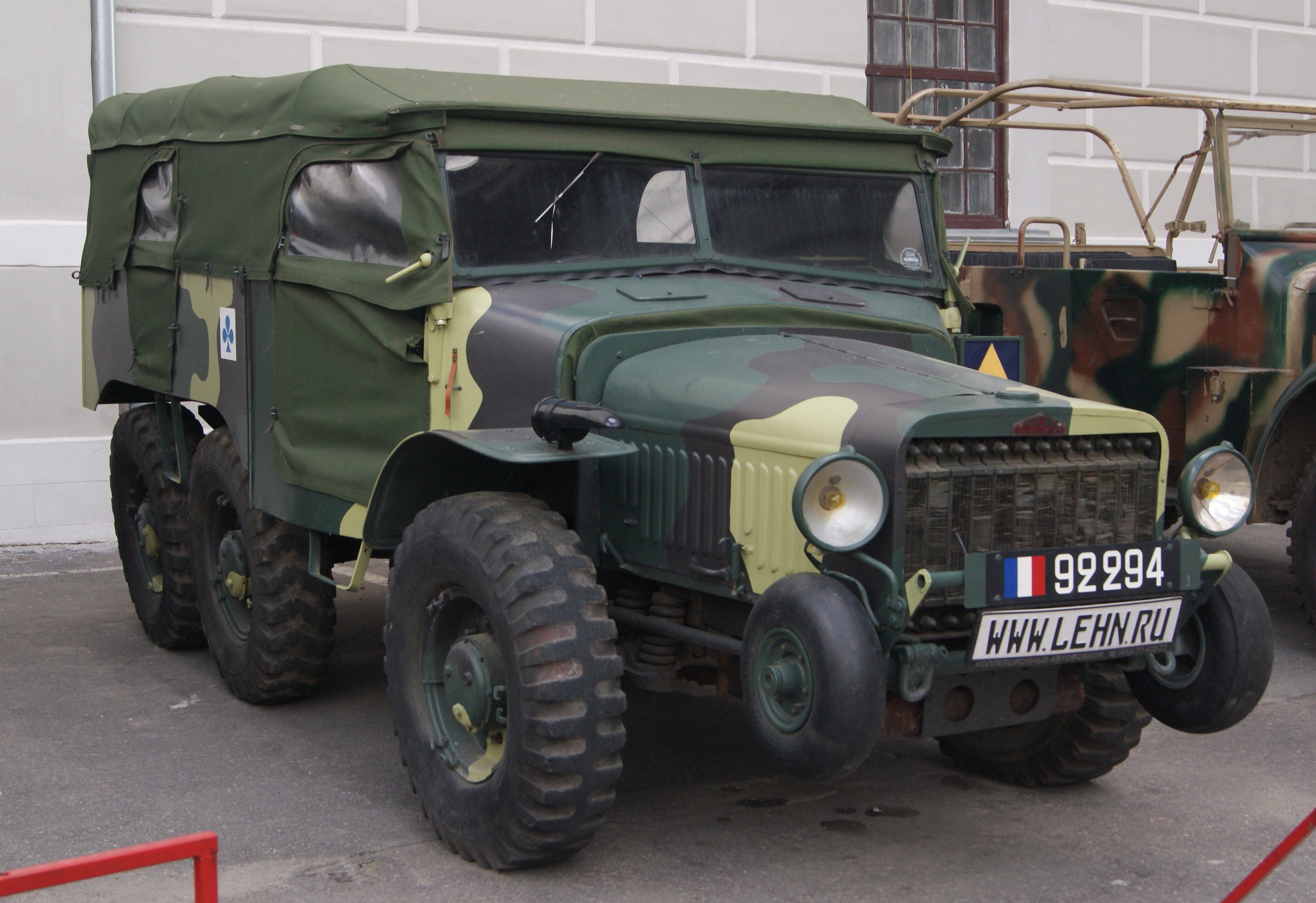
Laffly W15T
