= Laffly V15 =

Laffly V15T
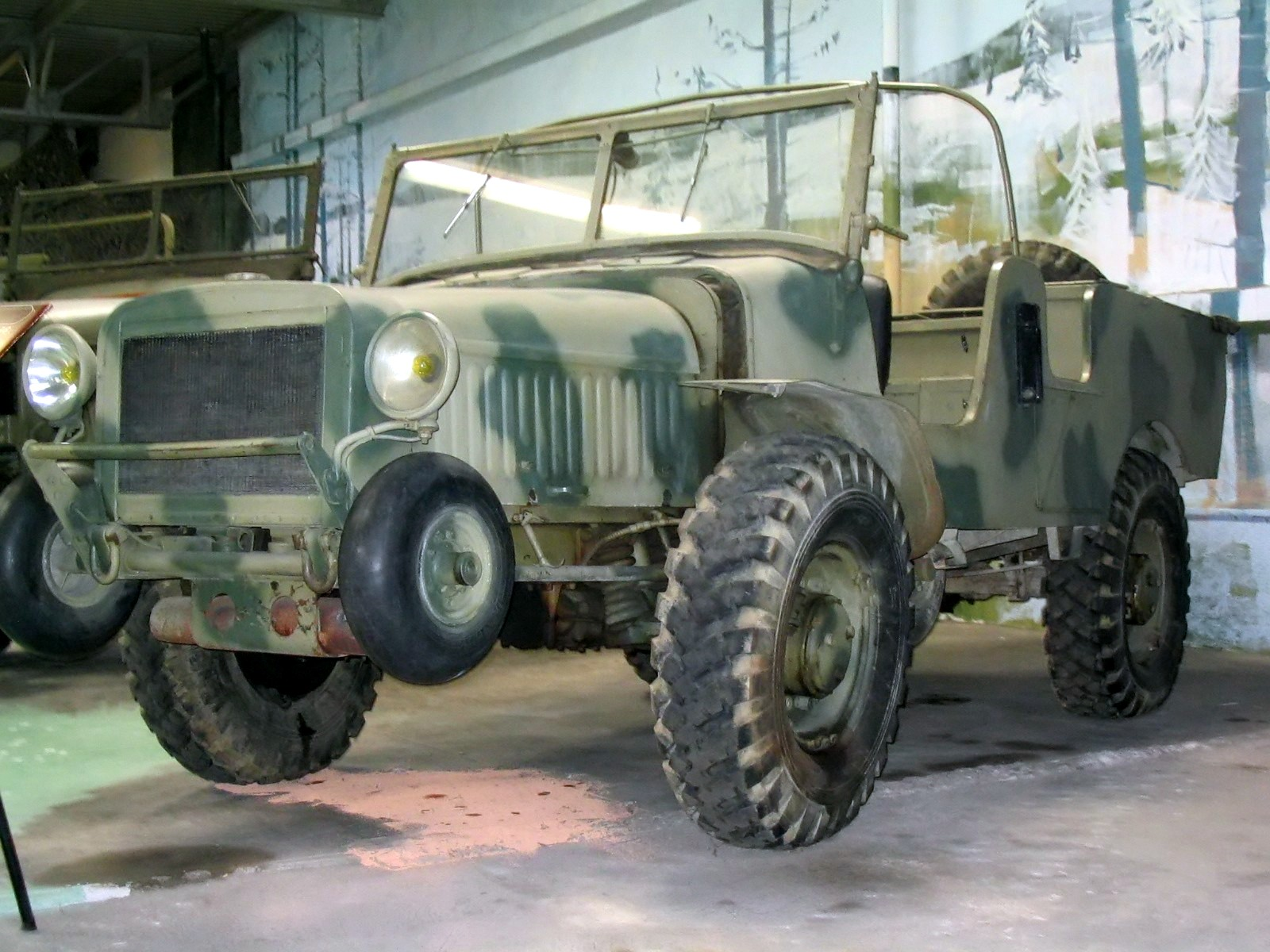
- V15T on display at Musée des Blindés
- Type: gun tractor
- Place of origin: France

Specifications
- Mass: 2.6 tonnes (5,700 pounds)
- Length: 4.21 m (13 ft 10 in)
- Width: 1.85 m (6 ft 1 in)
- Height: 1.85 m (6 ft 1 in)
- Crew: 2 + 3 passengers
- Armor: none
- Engine: 4-cylinder, petrol, 2300 cc 55hp
- Payload capacity: 700 kg (1,500 lb)
- Suspension: front: coil springs, rear: leaf springs, independent wheels
- Maximum speed: 58 km/h (36 mph)

The Laffly V15T was a French light 4WD artillery tractor used during World War II. It was used to tow the 25 mm SA anti-tank gun. A personnel carrier and reconnaissance vehicle based on the same chassis was designated as V15R. The Laffly company itself only manufactured the first batch of 100 V15s, the rest of the production being taken over by Corre La Licorne.
