= 25 mm Hotchkiss anti-tank gun =

Interwar French anti-tank gun

canon de 25 mm SA mle 1934
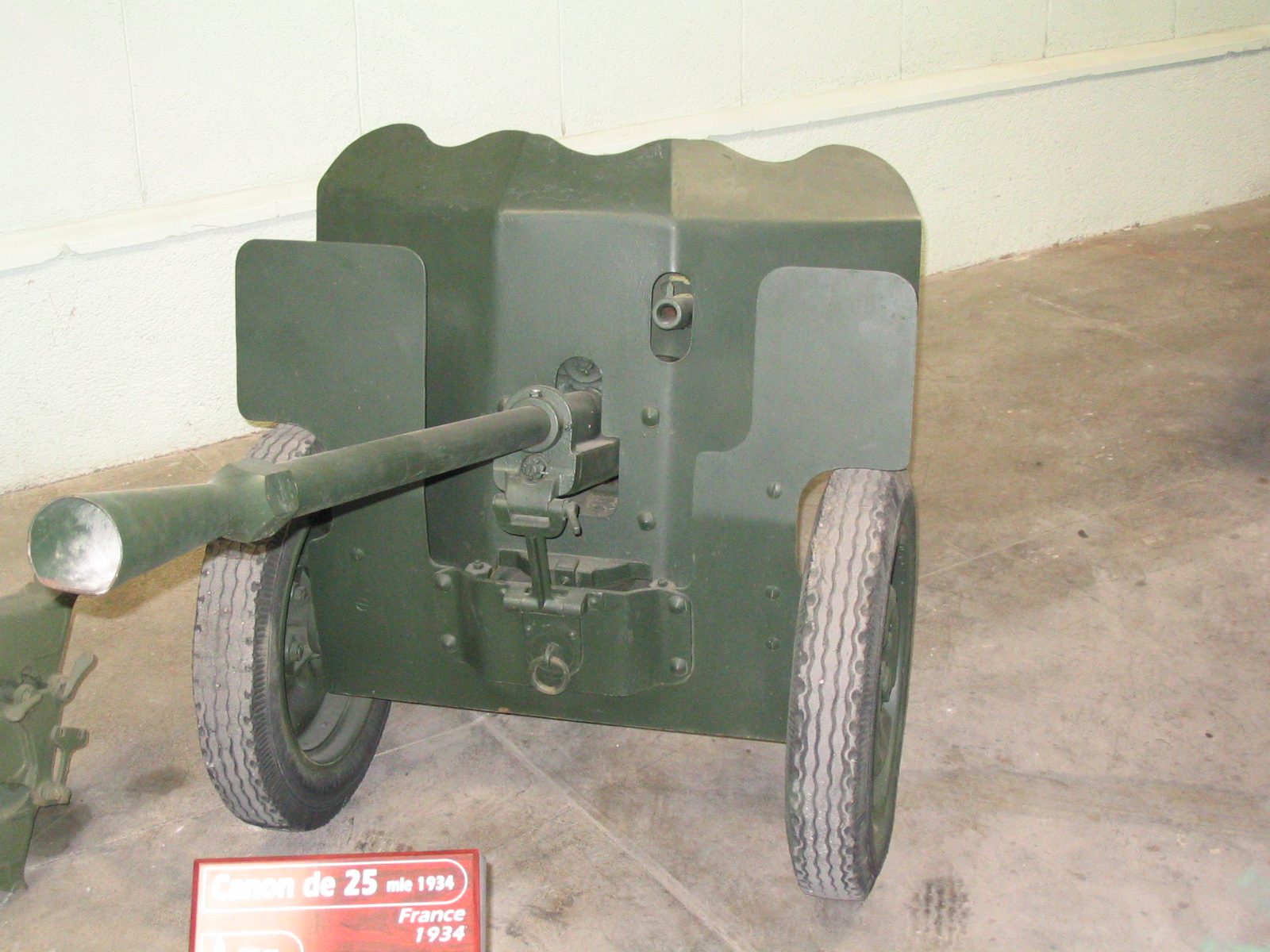
- The 25 mm SA mle 1934 anti-tank gun at Saumur Armour Museum.
- Type: Anti-tank gun
- Place of origin: France

Service history
- Used by: France; Nazi Germany (captured); United Kingdom; Italy(captured); Finland; Romania; Republican Spain
- Wars: Spanish Civil War; Winter War; World War II; Indochina War

Production history
- Designer: Hotchkiss
- Designed: 1934
- Manufacturer: Hotchkiss
- No. built: 6,000
- Variants: See variants

Specifications
- Mass: 480 kg (1,060 lb) (modèle 1934)
- Barrel length: 1.8 m (5 ft 11 in); 72 caliber (L/72)
- Crew: 4
- Shell: 25 × 193.5 mm R, AP
- Shell weight: 320 g (0.71 lb)
- Caliber: 25 mm (0.98 in)
- Carriage: Split-trail
- Elevation: -5° to +21°
- Traverse: 60°
- Rate of fire: 15–20 rounds/min
- Muzzle velocity: 918 m/s (3,012 ft/s)
- Effective firing range: 1 km (3,300 ft)
- Maximum firing range: 1.8 km (1.1 mi)

The 25 mm Hotchkiss anti-tank gun was a French anti-tank gun from the 1930s, built by the Hotchkiss arsenal, that saw service in the Spanish Civil War, the Second World War and the Indochina War.

Light and mobile, it could be improvised into a portée weapon by its users.

== Development ==
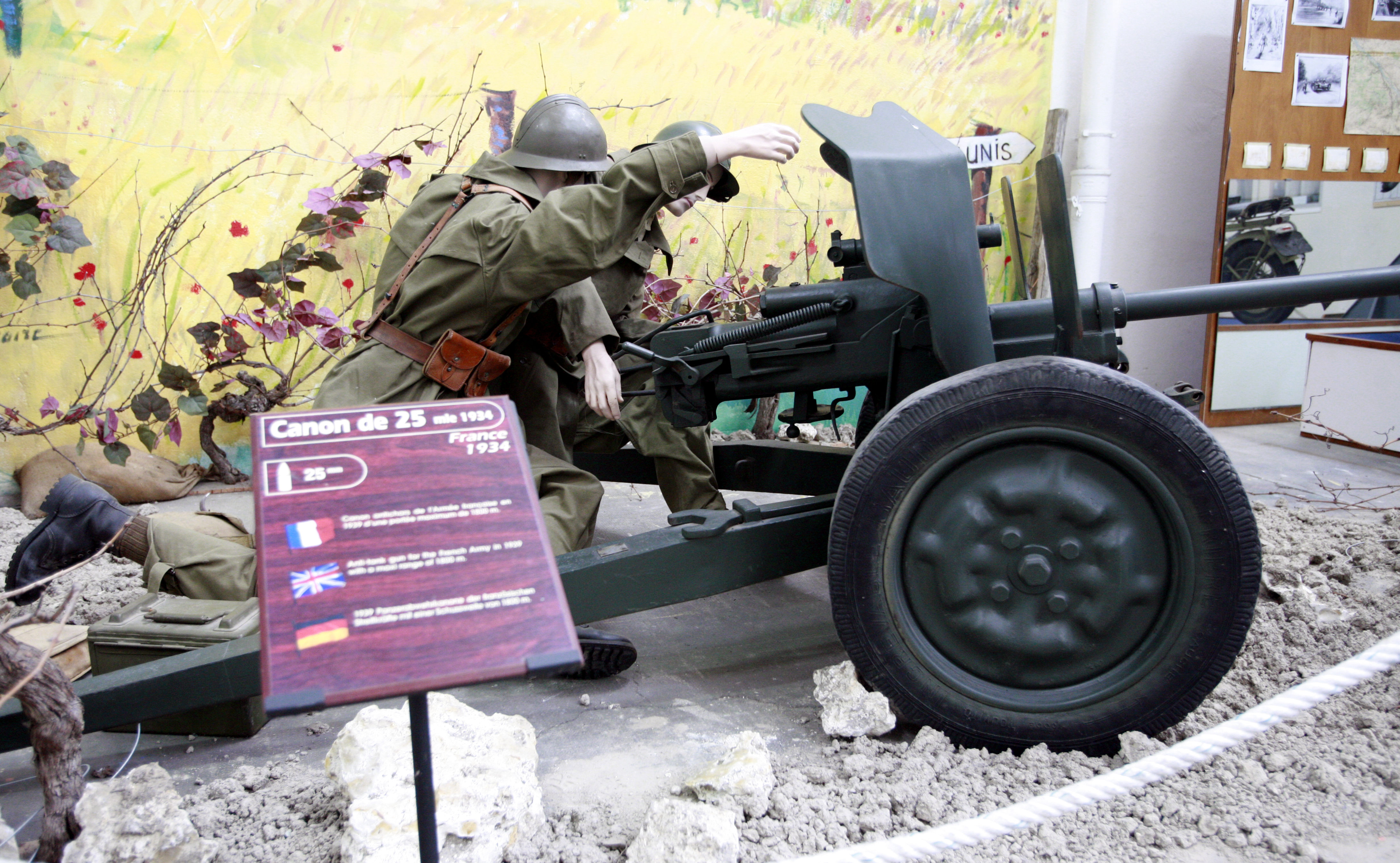
25 mm SA-L 34 anti-tank gun, on display at Saumur Général Estienne museum.

By the early 1920s, the French Army had realized that the armor-piercing capability of the 37 mm TRP infantry gun would be insufficient against modern tanks. In 1926 Hotchkiss proposed a 25 mm in-house design developed by its design office. This model was accepted for service in 1934 under the designation canon de 25 mm semi-automatique modèle 1934 ("25 mm semi-automatic gun model 1934", generally shortened to canon de 25). At the outbreak of World War II, it was the main anti-tank weapon of the French infantry. By May 1940, there were reportedly 6,000 in service with the French Army, although some formations were still awaiting their full allocation.

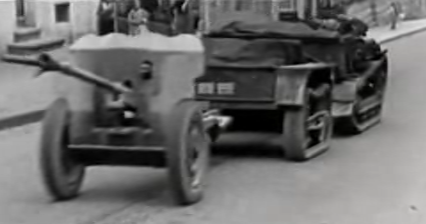
A canon de 25 mm being towed by a Renault UE prime mover with trailer, 25 July 1940.

During the Battle of France in 1940, it was found that the projectile had little effect against tanks. It often penetrated the German tanks of 1940 (which had no more than 30 mm of armor plate), but caused little internal damage or casualties. German tank crews were often able to bail out of a tank under 25 mm fire and return to their perforated tank later, to continue operations. It remained capable of penetrating armored cars and other light armored vehicles throughout WW2. In 1935 the Hotchkiss 25 mm anti-tank gun was purchased for evaluation by the US Army. Turkey bought 400 examples of the gun during the interwar period. During the Spanish Civil War, a few examples of the Hotchkiss gun reached the anti-Franco Republican forces. Some were mounted on captured Panzer I tanks.

== Variants ==
- Canon de 25 mm SA modèle 1934 (25 mm SA-L 34 L/72): Basic anti-tank gun variant. Could be mounted on vehicles such as the Laffly S20.
- Canon de 25 mm AC modèle 1934 (25 mm AC 34 L/72): So-called de forteresse (fortress version), adopted to equip the Maginot Line. The 25mm gun was not used alone but as part of a mixed armament. It was therefore associated with a twinning of Reibel machine guns sharing the same ball joint in a "trumelage" which had a single sight, common to both types of weapons. The length of the tube was reduced according to the type of bell in which the trumelage was to be mounted, with the length of the field gun being kept by the mounting in the casemate.
- Canon de 25 mm SA modèle 1935 (25 mm SA 35 L/47.2): Designed in 1935 in the Puteaux workshops (hence the acronym APX) to equip the Panhard 178 armoured car.
- Canon de 25 mm SA modèle 1937 (25 mm SA-L 37 L/77): a lengthened 77 caliber derivative designed by the APX with a much lighter 300 kg (660 lb) carriage. Some examples were used by the Romanian Army.

== Combat use ==
=== Britain ===
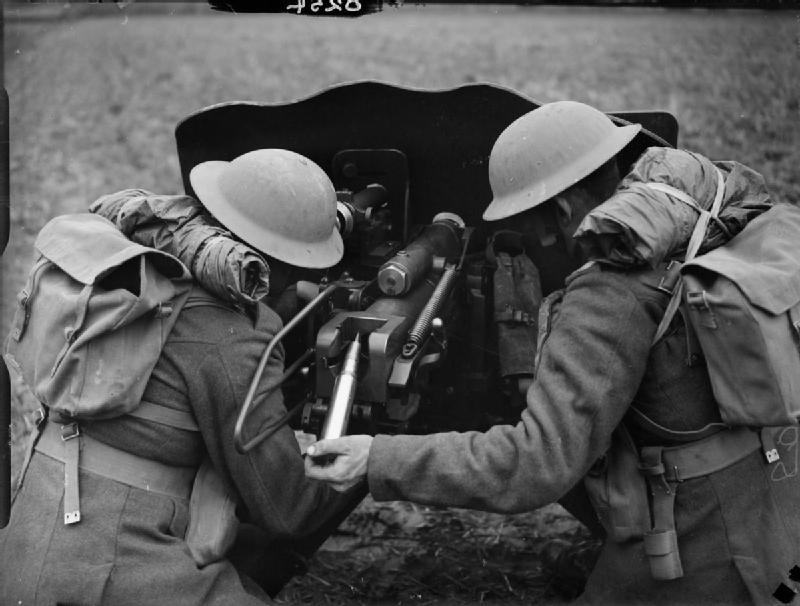
Men of the British Expeditionary Force train with a Hotchkiss 25mm anti-tank gun during the Phoney War, November 1939.

When the British Expeditionary Force landed in France in 1939, it had insufficient numbers of anti-tank weapons such as the Ordnance QF 2-pounder. They were issued 300 canons de 25 which became known as Anti-Tank Gun, 25 mm. Hotchkiss, Mark I on 25 mm. Carriage, Mark I in British service. The BEF was fully mechanized and attempted to tow the weapon behind their vehicles, but quickly found it was not robust enough, as British troops had been issued the hippomobile version of the cannon (designed to be towed by horses). The solution was to use the gun as a portée, that is, carried in the back of a truck. It was the first artillery piece to be used in this way.

=== Finland ===
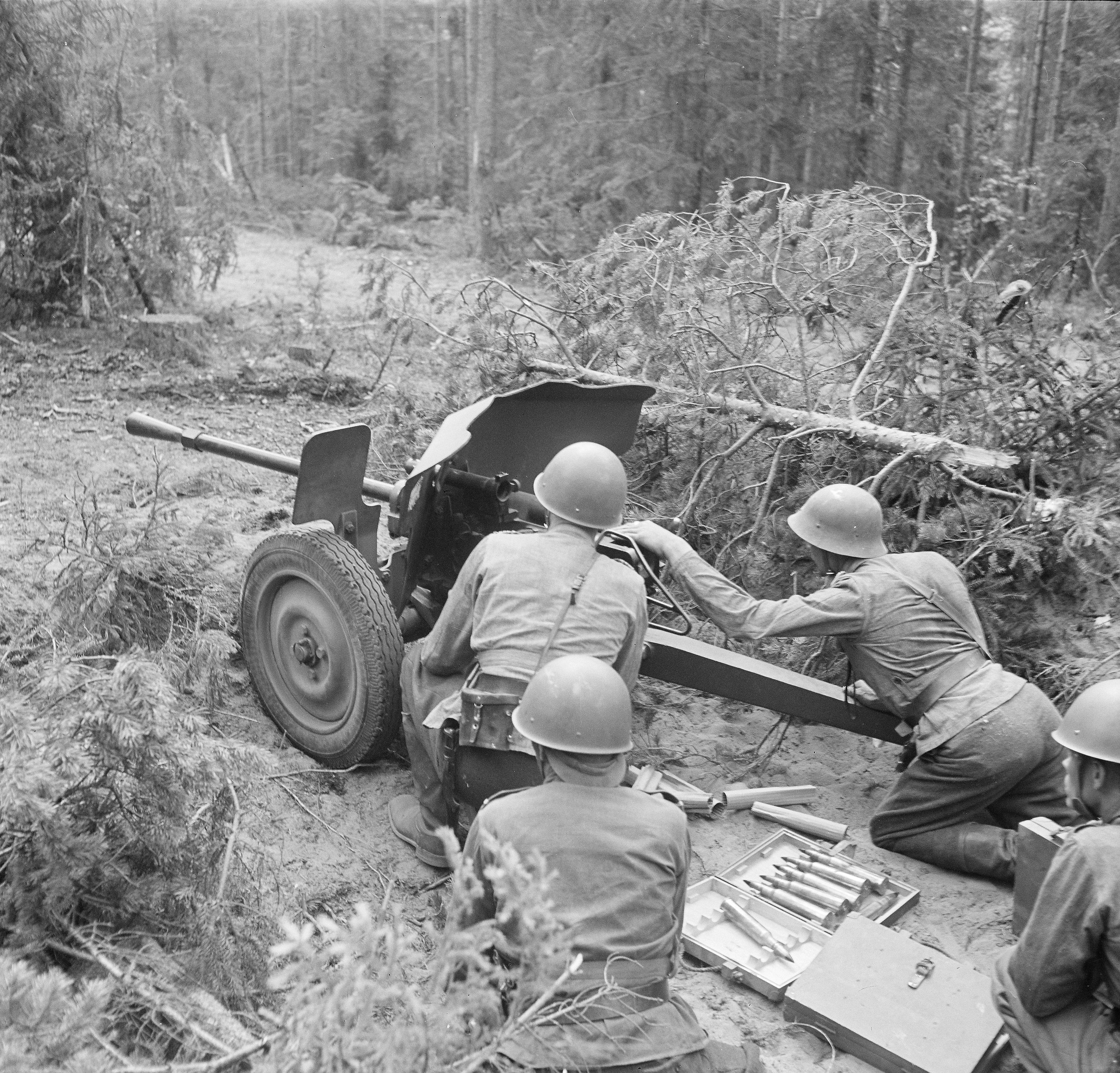
Finnish PstK/34 "Marianne" during the Continuation War, 25 July 1941.

Finland purchased 50 French 25 mm APX M/37 anti-tank guns during the Winter War through Aladar Paasonen, but only 40 of them were delivered in February 1940 through Norway. The remaining ten guns were captured by the Germans when they invaded Norway in the spring of 1940. About half of the guns, which had arrived during the Winter War, saw front-line service, and three of them were lost in battle. During the Interim Peace, the Germans sold 200 captured guns to Finland. 133 of them were model M/34s and 67 were model M/37s; they were designated 25 PstK/34 and 25 PstK/37, respectively, bearing the nickname of "Marianne". They then served in the Continuation War, until being withdrawn from front line service by 1943.

=== France ===
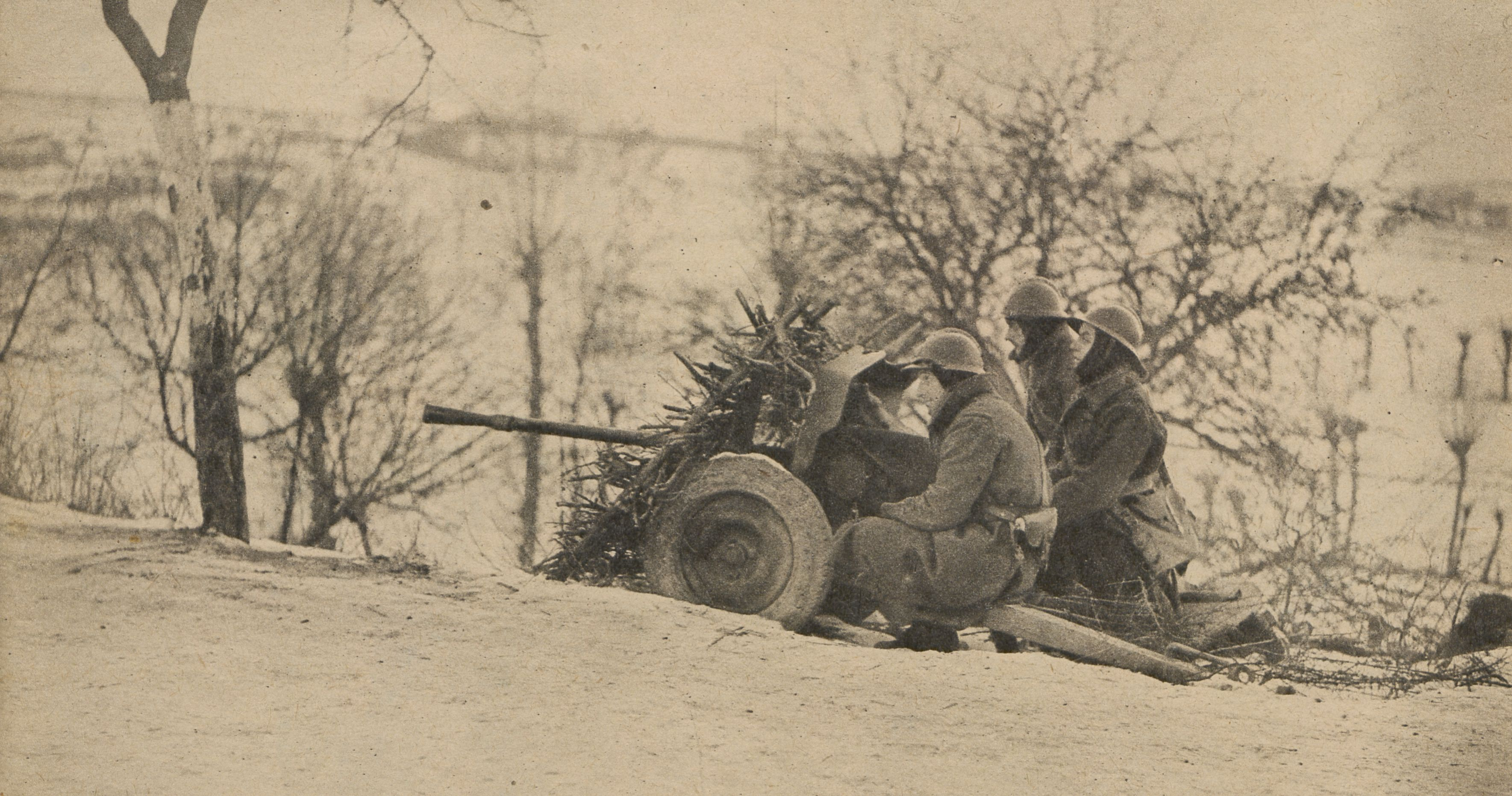
French soldiers serving a Hotchkiss antitank gun during the Phoney War, January 1940.

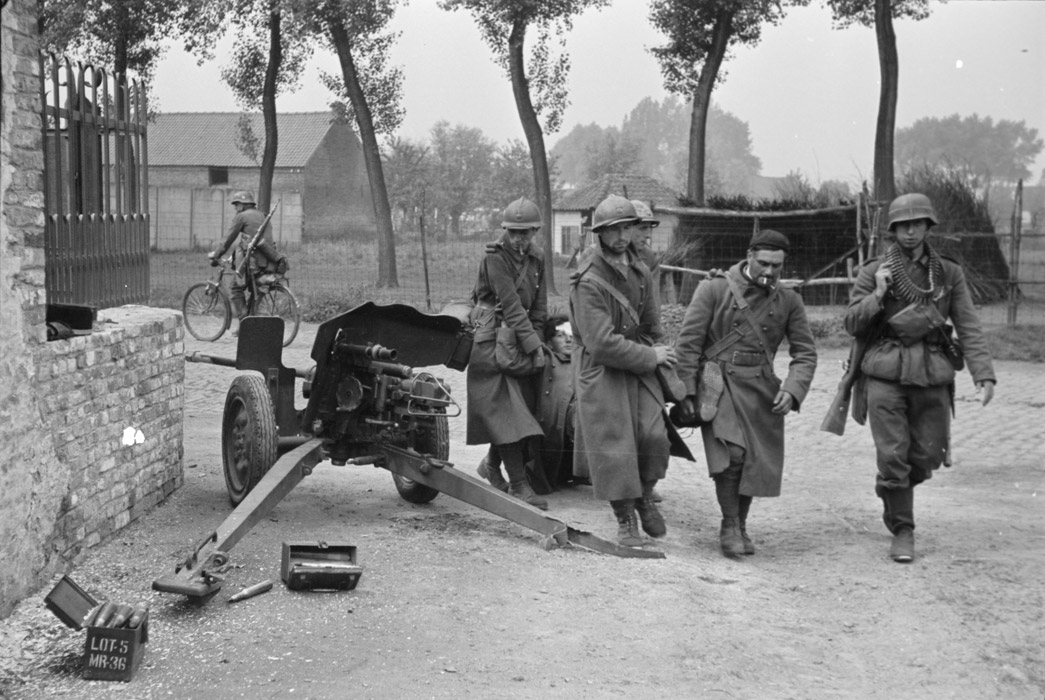
French prisoners from the 158th Infantry Regiment, pass a damaged 25mm Hotchkiss AT gun in Thulin, Belgium, 23 May 1940.

At the outbreak of World War II, the 25 mm SA modèle 1934 was assigned to almost all armored and anti-tank units of the French army, while the 25 mm SA modèle 1937 was used in support companies of the infantry battalions. Despite its low caliber, which forced its crew to target precisely the weak points of the opposing tanks, it remained for the time a powerful anti-tank gun against the Panzer II, III and IV which constituted the majority of the German tanks during the invasion of France by the Nazi regime. The Hotchkiss proved effective at the Battle of St. Quentin, during the first combat of May 15, 1940, when a single 25mm gun lying in ambush on the edge of the village neutralized 3 Panzer IV tanks in 5 minutes. During the defense of Rouen on June 9, 1940, positioned at the foot of the old Corneille bridge, had its line of sight on the German tanks which descended the rue de la République, and fired several shots, destroying two panzers. According to another version of this encounter, a Renault R35 tank, laying in ambush near the barricade, was responsible for the destruction of one of the two panzers. They could not have been destroyed by the Renault FT tanks, as the tanks were only equipped with machine guns.

=== Germany ===
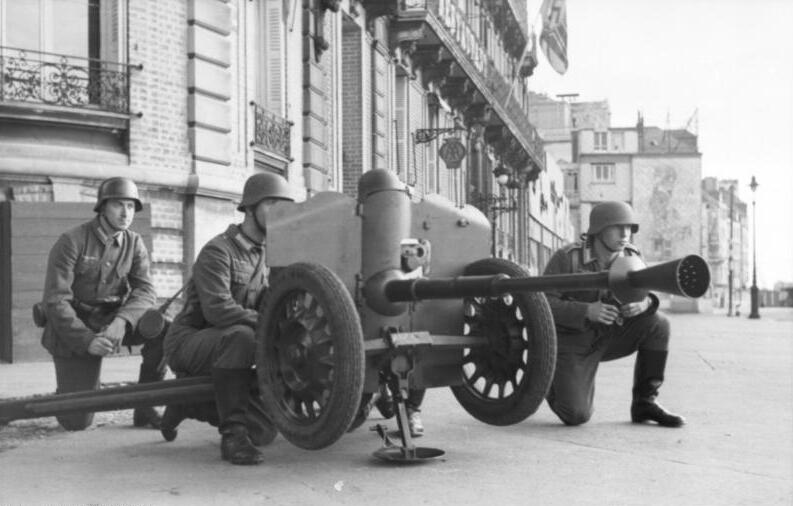
German gun crew of four men with a 2,5 cm Pak 113(f) in Northern France, 21 June 1942.

Falling in large numbers into the hands of the Germans after the defeat of 1940, the gun was put back into service with the Wehrmacht under the designation 2,5 cm Pak 112(f) for mle 1934 guns and 2,5 cm Pak 113(f) for mle 1937 guns, with the (f) for französische ("French"). Additionally, the SA 35 gun was designated 2.5 cm KwK 121(f).

=== Italy ===
Some captured guns also made it into Italian service in North Africa as alternatives to the Solothurn S-18/1000, under the designation cannone da 25/72.

=== Viet Minh ===
Some were used by the Việt Minh at the beginning of the First Indochina War.

== See also ==
- 25 mm Hotchkiss anti-aircraft gun, an AA weapon firing a shorter round
- 47 mm APX anti-tank gun
- Type 96 25 mm AT/AA Gun
- 3.7 cm Pak 36
