= Canon de 105 court modèle 1935 B =

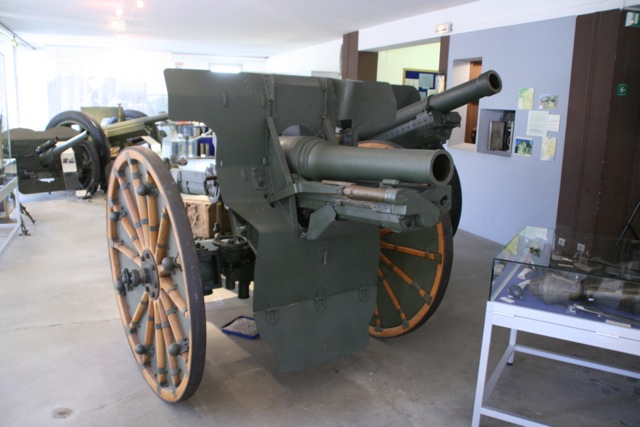
- In the Draguignan artillery museum
- Type: Howitzer
- Place of origin: France

Service history
- In service: 1936–1945
- Used by: France; Nazi Germany
- Wars: World War II; Indochina War

Production history
- Designer: State Arsenal at Bourges
- Manufacturer: Bourges
- Produced: 1936–1939

Specifications
- Mass: 1,627 kg (3,587 lb)
- Barrel length: 1.5 m (4 ft 11 in) L/16.7
- Shell: 105 × 245mm R
- Shell weight: 15.6 kg (34 lb)
- Caliber: 105 mm (4.1 in)
- Carriage: Split trail
- Elevation: −6° to 50°
- Traverse: 58°
- Rate of fire: 5 rpm
- Muzzle velocity: 442 m/s (1,450 ft/s)
- Maximum firing range: 10,300 m (11,300 yd)

The Canon de 105 court modèle 1935 B was a French howitzer used in World War II. It was designed by the State Arsenal at Bourges to replace the Canon de 105 court modèle 1934 Schneider. Some 610 were originally ordered, although production was terminated in 1939 in favor of anti-tank guns. Only some 232 were in service when the German attacked in May 1940. Captured weapons were used by the German Heer as the 10.5 cm leFH 325(f) and assigned to training and second-line occupation units. During Italy's occupation of southern France, 127 pieces were captured by the Royal Italian Army, which used it under the name Obice da 105/15.

== Design ==
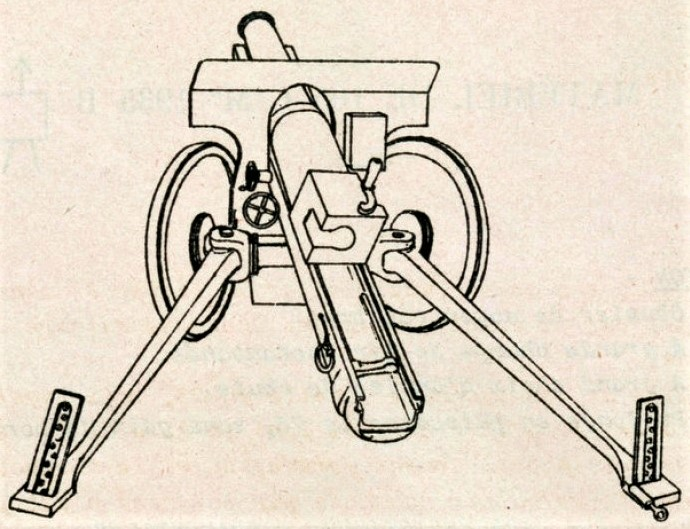
A rear view showing its toed-in wheels.

An unusual feature of the design was that the wheels, which were pressed steel with either solid rims or pneumatic tires, moved with the trail legs and "toed-in" when the gun was in action to provide more cover for the crew.
