= Lorraine 37L =

French tracked carrier

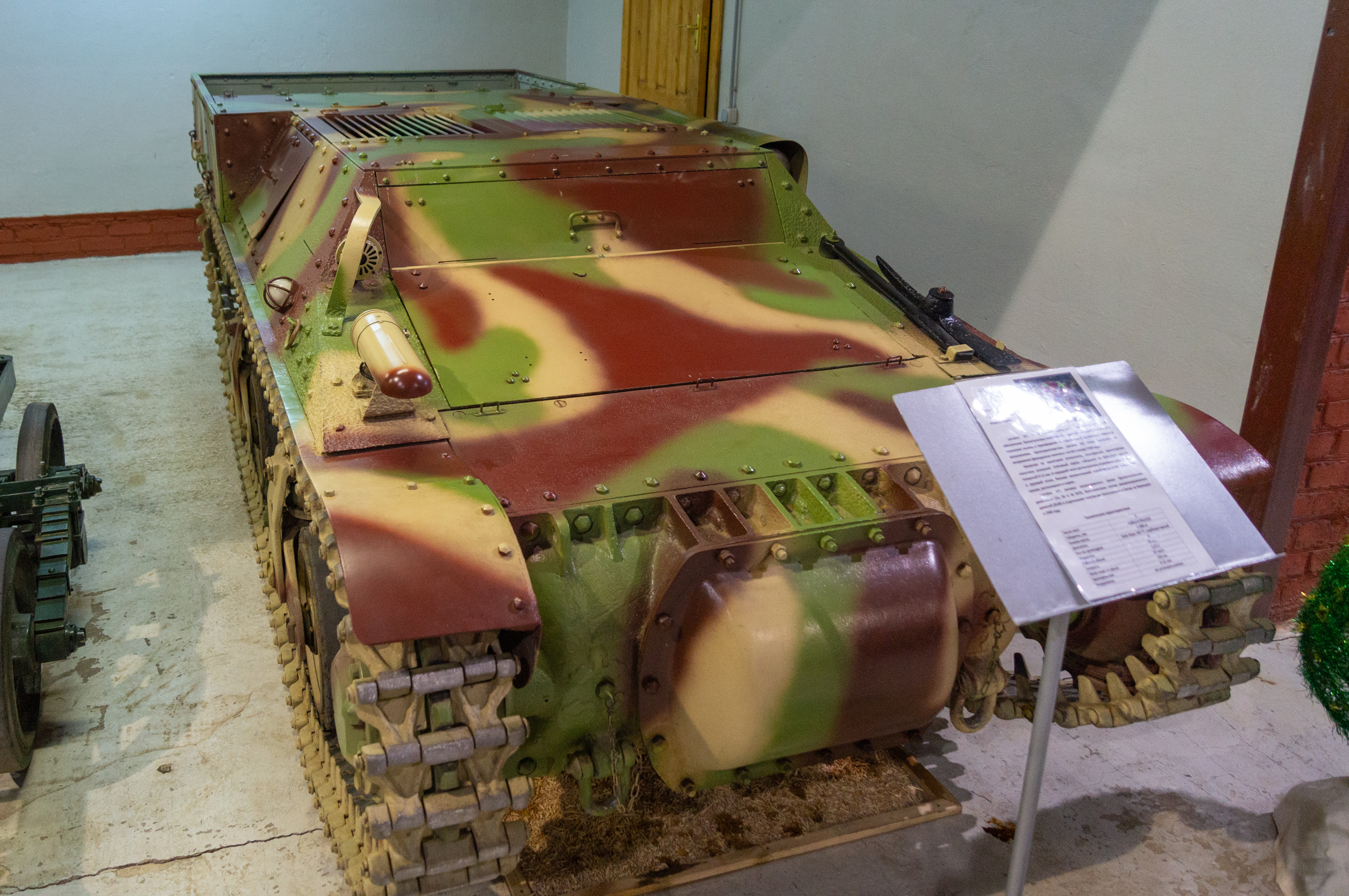
- Type: Tracked carrier
- Place of origin: France

Service history
- Used by: France, Nazi Germany, Syria
- Wars: World War II

Production history
- Designer: Lorraine
- Designed: 1936
- Manufacturer: Lorraine, Fouga
- Produced: January 1939 - November 1942
- No. built: ~480 by June 1940; ~630 in total

Specifications
- Mass: 6.05 tonnes loaded
- Length: 4.20 m (13 ft 9 in)
- Width: 1.57 m (5 ft 2 in)
- Height: 1.29 m (4 ft 3 in)
- Crew: two
- Engine: Delahaye type 135 6-cylinder inline 70 hp (52 kW)
- Payload capacity: 810 kg + 690 kg
- Suspension: leaf spring
- Ground clearance: 30 cm (12 in)
- Fuel capacity: 114 litres
- Operational range: 137 km (85 mi)
- Maximum speed: 35 km/h (22 mph)

The Lorraine 37L or Tracteur de ravitaillement pour chars 1937 L ("tank supply tractor 1937 L") is a light tracked armoured vehicle developed by the Lorraine company during the interwar period or interbellum, before the Second World War, to an April 1936 French Army requirement for a fully armoured munition and fuel supply carrier to be used by tank units for front line resupply. A prototype was built in 1937 and production started in 1939. In this period, two armoured personnel carriers and a tank destroyer project were also based on its chassis. Mainly equipping the larger mechanised units of the French Infantry arm, the type was extensively employed during the Battle of France in 1940. After the defeat of France, clandestine manufacture was continued in Vichy France, culminating in a small AFV production after the liberation and bringing the total production to about 630 in 1945. Germany used captured vehicles in their original role of carrier and later, finding the suspension system to be particularly reliable, rebuilt many into tank destroyers (Panzerjaeger) of the Marder I type or into self-propelled artillery.

== Development ==
In 1934, the order was given to design a munition supply vehicle to increase the operational range of independent tank units. The same year, the Renault 36R was selected for further development; three hundred were ordered from 1938. However, this tractor was only partially armoured; on 17 April 1936, a new set of specifications was drafted for a fully armoured vehicle to deliver fuel and munitions to tanks fighting on the frontline.

Early in 1937, the Lorraine company finished a prototype. It was a lengthened version of a proposed replacement type for the 1931 model Renault UE Chenillette tracked infantry supply tractor. In February 1937, the matériel commission, the Commission de Vincennes, was ordered to test the prototype and to complete an evaluation before 1 November 1937, even if testing had not been finished. The prototype was only presented on 9 July and tested until 4 August. It was equipped with a 2371 cc Delahaye four cylinder 124 F engine. Although the vehicle attained a maximum speed of 30 km/h (19 mph), this dropped to an unacceptably low 22.8 km/h (14.2 mph) when an intended fuel trailer was attached. It was therefore returned to the factory and a more powerful Delahaye 135 engine and stronger clutch were fitted. This vehicle was tested between 22 September and 29 October and achieved the desired 35 km/h (22 mph).

== Production ==
The commission approved the type during late 1937, being especially impressed by the rugged suspension system. It was decided in September 1939 to reserve the total production capacity of the suspension elements for the larger tractor. This implied that the shorter Lorraine replacement for the Renault UE, though also favoured over other candidates, would not be taken into production: an order of hundred made early 1939 was that month shifted towards the longer version.

In 1938, three orders were made: of 78, 100 and another 100 vehicles of the Tracteur de ravitaillement pour chars 1937 L (TRC 37L); in 1939, before the war, a fourth order of 100 followed, and then a fifth of 74, to which was added the replacement order of 100 for a total of 552. The first vehicle was delivered by Lorraine on 11 January 1939; 212 had been delivered by 1 September 1939.

The ambitious plans made after the outbreak of war for the expansion of the number of armoured divisions meant that the Lorraine 37L orders had to be enlarged accordingly, bringing the total to 1,012. The intended initial production rate was fifty per month, to be expanded to seventy. To assist in the manufacture, a second assembly hall was erected by Fouga at Béziers, where it was hoped that it could produce at first twenty and later thirty vehicles per month. In reality, this number was never attained; e.g. 20 were made in January and 32 by both companies in May 1940. By 26 May 1940, 432 vehicles had been delivered to the army from Lorraine and Fouga out of 440 produced. Production continued after that date and an estimated total of about 480 to 490 had been reached by 25 June 1940, the end of the Battle of France.

== Description ==
Derived from a chenillette project, the Lorraine 37 L was a rather small vehicle, just 1.57 metres wide. Space had been found by lengthening the chassis to 4.22 metres, making it rather oblong. Lacking a turret or superstructure its height was also not excessive at just 1.215 metres. The small dimensions combined with light armour — nine millimetres for the vertical riveted plates, six for the top and bottom and twelve for the cast rounded nose section — ensured a low weight: the basic TRC 37L weighs just 5.24 tonnes empty, the trailer adding 1.2 tonnes.

Given the vehicle's low weight, the suspension was quite robust and exceptionally reliable in comparison with other systems used on French armour of the time, which were either too complicated or too flimsy. Six large road wheels in three pairs of bogies gave a low ground pressure and good weight distribution. Each bogie was allowed a vertical movement in its entirety, sprung by an inverted leaf spring assembly located just below the upper track run, the three assemblies being placed between the four top rollers. The tracks were 22 cm (8.7 in) wide. The drive sprockets were in front and driven by a transmission in the nose of the vehicle. The two crew members, the driver on the left, sat in the forward compartment, the drive shaft between them. Entrance to the compartment was by two wide horizontal hatches, the upper hinging upwards, allowing the driver an unobstructed view if opened, the lower hinging downwards.

The centrally positioned engine compartment was separated by a bulkhead from the driver compartment in front of it. The external silencer was on the left of the vehicle under an armoured covering. All vehicles in the series were powered by a Delahaye Type 135 six-cylinder 3.556 litre engine developing 70 bhp (52 kW) at 2800 rpm, giving a maximum speed of 35 km/h (22 mph) and an average speed of 20 km/h (12 mph). The wading capacity was 60 centimetres, a trench of 130 centimetres could be crossed and an incline of 50% climbed. There was a fuel supply of 114 litres, giving a range of 137 km (85 mi). There were five forward gears and one rear gear.

At the back was an armoured ammunition bin; a load of 810 kilograms could be carried, bringing the weight to 6.05 tonnes. As with the Renault UE, the TRC 37L was supplied with a tracked, armoured trailer with two road wheels per side, mostly used to carry a 565-litre fuel tank to supply the tank units; total load capacity was 690 kg for a total for the combination of 1.5 tonnes, and a total weight of the trailer of 1890 kg. At 155 cm, the trailer was somewhat narrower than the main vehicle, and higher at 133 cm. It increased the combined length to 6.9 metres. The trailer also carried a Vulcano fuel pump and stowage boxes for lubrication oil, greases, water and assorted equipment to serve the tank maintenance teams.

The Lorraine 37Ls were painted in the standard army green, a rather greyish colour, over which a brown pattern of dark earth was sprayed.

== Tactical function and operational history ==
In 1939, the Lorraine 37 L was gradually introduced to the supply units of the tank battalions. This coincided with a change in tactical thinking about the use of armour. In the early thirties, French doctrine had favoured construction of ever deeper defensive belts to counter infantry infiltration tactics to defeat enemy attacks before they could develop into full-scale manoeuvre warfare, a field at which the French were aware of being less adept than their most likely adversary, Germany. Expecting any possible enemy to defend themselves likewise, the armour branch of the French Infantry became much preoccupied with the vexing problem of how to break through similar in-depth positions, emphasizing close cooperation with the foot soldier. Far less attention was paid to the next phase: the envelopment of the enemy forces.

The situation changed in the late thirties. Having at last built a considerable number of modern and well-armoured tanks, the Infantry became confident in its ability to break the enemy line, if sufficient artillery and air support was provided within a combined arms tactic. At the same time the political situation made it likely that large-scale offensives were needed to bring Germany to its knees. Though few officers advocated the creation of armoured divisions able to execute both the breakthrough and the strategic exploitation phase — these required trained personnel in numbers that simply would not be available — it was understood that the "manoeuvre mass" of tanks effecting the break would immediately have to envelop the defensive enemy position and defeat counterattacking enemy armour reserves, otherwise the momentum of the attack would be lost and the breach would not be kept open long enough for the motorised divisions and cavalry armoured divisions to be launched to quickly occupy and hold strategic key positions.

However, this posed a serious logistical problem: trucks would not be able to closely follow the tanks on the battlefield. The prescribed procedure for resupplying was for the tanks to return to their start positions to be refitted. While this had been practical in the previous war with its much slower tempo of operations, it was unacceptable in modern warfare. The tanks would have to be supplied in the field to continue their advance as soon as possible. Thus a tracked supply vehicle was needed that could overcome the expected poor terrain conditions, with many shell-craters and trenches, and it had to be armoured to protect against shell-fragments, given that the breakthrough sector would likely be in range of concentrated enemy artillery.

The type was provided to the armoured units of both the Infantry and the Cavalry. Each independent tank battalion of the Infantry, or Bataillon de Chars de Combat, had an organic strength of twelve Lorraine tractors: four in the peloton de reserve (supply platoon) of each of its three companies. The BCCs incorporated in the armoured divisions and equipped with the Char B1 or Char B1 bis had 27 TRC 37Ls: each of their three companies had six tractors in its supply platoon and furthermore a single tractor organic to each of its three tank platoons. This extra allotment was made to compensate for the large fuel consumption of these heavy tanks, that, apart from being simply bigger, had also a rather limited range. Each group of three tanks was in their case thus directly followed by its own fuel supply.

When, during the Battle of France, independent companies were formed, these, too, had their Lorraine tractors — an increased allotment of eight if a Char B1 bis unit, otherwise the standard allotment of four. However, the older FT 17 battalions only used fuel trucks. Likewise, the TRC 37L was not in common use in the colonies; however, when the 67e BCC, which was equipped with the Char D1, was brought over from Tunisia in June, it was provided with tractors. The motorised infantry divisions did not use the TRC 37L.

In the Cavalry, each squadron of twenty tanks had three Lorraine tractors, for a total of 24 for each mechanised light division. The AMR 35 or Panhard 178 units did not use the type, just trucks as its speed was considered insufficient. It was proposed to remedy this by fitting a stronger engine, bringing the speed to 50 km/h (31 mph). The TRC 37L was also not present in the cavalry light divisions.

In practice, the supply vehicles would mainly move by road and meet with the tanks at predetermined rendez-vous points. Refuelling was relatively quick as the Vulcano could theoretically pump 565 litres in fifteen minutes. To completely refill a heavy tank would normally take about forty to sixty minutes. The trailer fuel reservoirs could themselves be replenished by the company fuel truck carrying 3600 litres of petrol. The company supplies could again be restocked from battalion stocks, moved by trucks loaded with fifty litre fuel drums. This method of distribution ensured a sufficient fuel supply on the tactical level, but was too cumbersome for strategic movements: if large distances had to be covered on track, the tanks would be directly refuelled from fuel trucks.

When the Germans invaded on 10 May, French tank units had an organic strength of 606 Lorraine 37Ls; the numbers produced were thus insufficient to provide each unit with its official complement. About a third had to do without. That day French general headquarters decided to increase the TRC 37L strength of 1e and 2e DCR by a half; these armoured divisions had been earmarked as reserves against an expected German breakthrough attempt in the Gembloux Gap and the low range of the Char B1 bis worried French command. To free enough tractors, 3e DCR, still in the process of being constituted, had to give up its twelve TRC L37s to 1e DCR. However, contrary to French expectations, the main German breakthrough would be at Sedan and 3e DCR was sent to block it — and despite its larger number of fuel tractors, 1e DCR was still surprised by 7. Panzerdivision while refuelling on 15 May.

During the campaign, the TRC 37L crews quickly saw the need for some armament and began to improvise machine-gun mounts on their vehicles.

== Variants ==
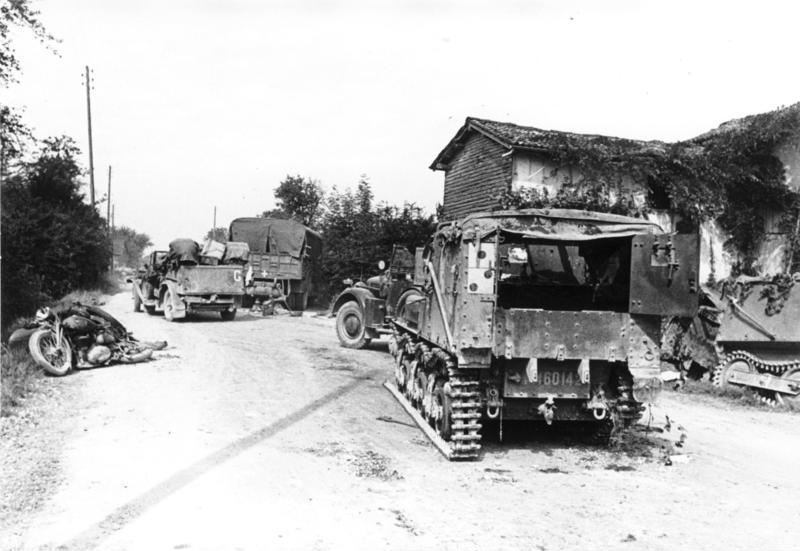
An abandoned VBCP 38L in 1940

The first development from the TRC 37L was an armoured personnel carrier, the Voiture blindée de chasseurs portés 38L ("Armoured mounted infantry vehicle 38L"). Like the TRC 37L, this Lorraine 38L was equipped with an armoured tracked trailer. The total capacity was twelve men: the driver and one passenger in the driving compartment, four in the former cargo bay, and six in the trailer. To protect the infantry squad, high box-like armoured superstructures were built over both the bin and the trailer, with doors at their back. The loaded weight of the main vehicle was 7.7 tonnes. A total of 240 VBCP 38L vehicles were ordered, of which nine had been delivered on 1 September 1939 and around 150 by 25 June 1940. In view of the war threat, the order was made before the prototype could be tested. Of all participants in the Battle of France, the French army would thus be the only one to employ a fully tracked APC. The vehicles were intended for the Bataillon de Chasseurs Portés, the (single) mechanised infantry battalion within the Division Cuirassée, or armoured division of the Infantry. However, on 10 May, they had not yet been allocated to these units, who still used half-tracks. During May, the vehicles were hurriedly taken into use by the 5e BCP and 17e BCP of the 1re DCr and 2nd DCr respectively. The 4e DCr did not receive any.

An improved model, the VBCP 39L, was created by expanding the cargo bay to carry eight passengers, excluding the two crew members. This model had no trailer and a total capacity of ten persons; extra room was found by raising the upper deck — the passenger compartment was open-topped — and constructing a more forward sloped armour glacis, contiguous with the nose section; the type thus resembled postwar APCs. Some two hundred VBCP 39L vehicles were ordered, to replace the 38L on the production lines from the 241st vehicle onwards, but none had been delivered by June 1940, the manufacture remaining limited to a single prototype. Experimental and limited production models included tank destroyers armed with 47 mm SA 47 guns (Chasseur de Chars Lorraine) and command post vehicles; probably a Voiture de transmissions blindée sur TRC Lorraine 37 L ER prototype was produced.

== Vichy production ==
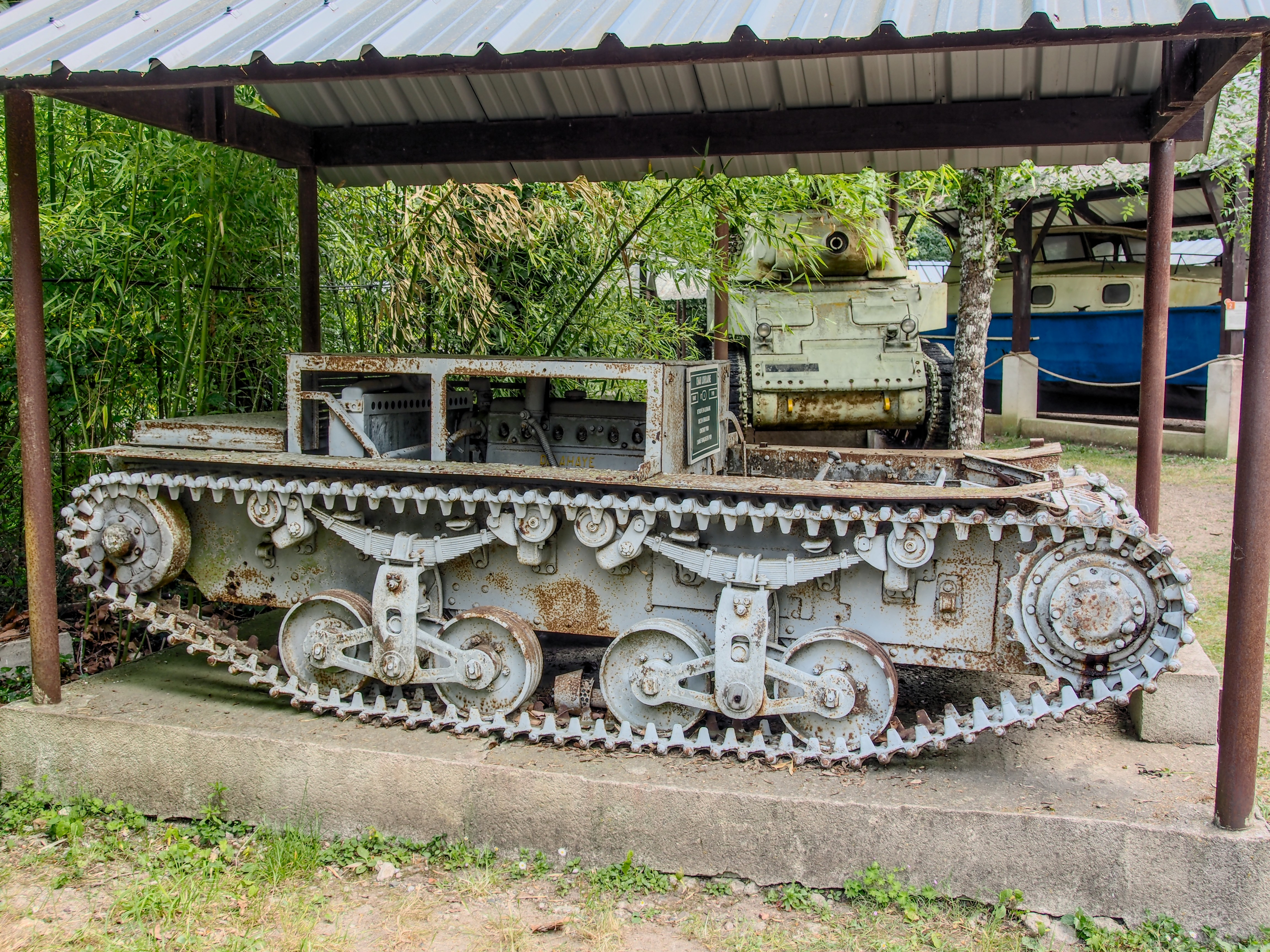
The shorter version with two bogies

In 1939 and 1940 the type had been mainly produced in the Lorraine factory at Lunéville. Early 1939 it was decided to erect a factory in a more southern location, less vulnerable to German bombing, at Bagnères-de-Bigorre. This Atelier de Bagnères had not made a single vehicle by the time of the armistice between France and Germany, but it was, like the other tractor-producing Fouga factory at Béziers, located in the unoccupied zone of Vichy France. Limited production continued after June 1940 for a total of about 150, although military models were not officially produced. Some of these vehicles had a shortened chassis, their suspension consisting of only two bogies per side. Lorraine tractors were ostensively fitted for use in forestry and construction; in reality they constituted a clandestine armoured fighting vehicle production as they could be easily rebuilt. The AMX factory secretly produced armoured bodies for these vehicles, which were stockpiled. The type was called the Tracteur Lorraine 37 L 44. After the German occupation of the south of France in November 1942, many of these chassis were hidden. In the spring of 1944, the French resistance attacked the Bagnères factory on orders from London, the allies assuming that it produced vehicles for Germany. To prevent further attacks, the resistance was informed of and involved in the affair in the summer of 1944 by the promise to arm existing vehicles for their use. The first twenty of these were delivered in January 1945, after the liberation, and the factory continued modifying vehicles for the duration of the war at a rate of about twenty a month, often by fitting an armoured superstructure, armed with a light or heavy machine-gun, to the front or back of the chassis.

== German use ==
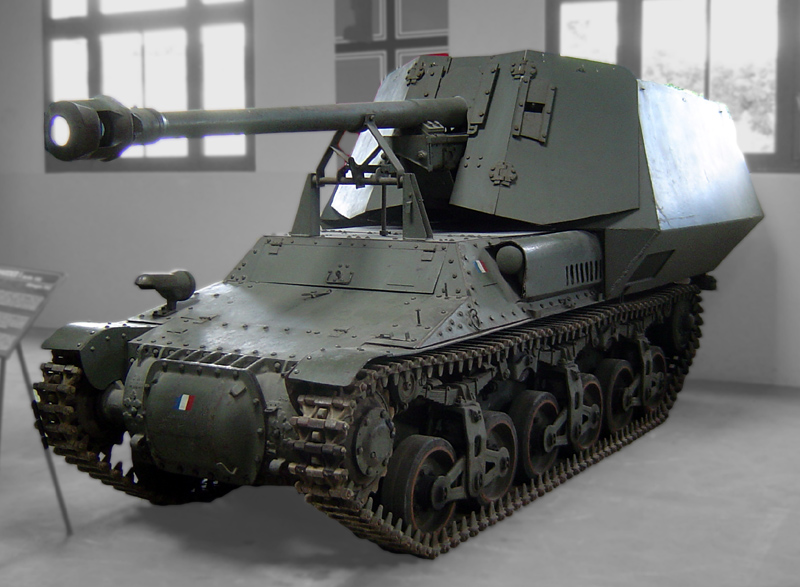
Marder I tank destroyer using a Lorraine 37L as chassis. The Lorraine 37L is clearly visible on the lower half of the vehicle below its gun-holding superstructure as the vehicle chassis

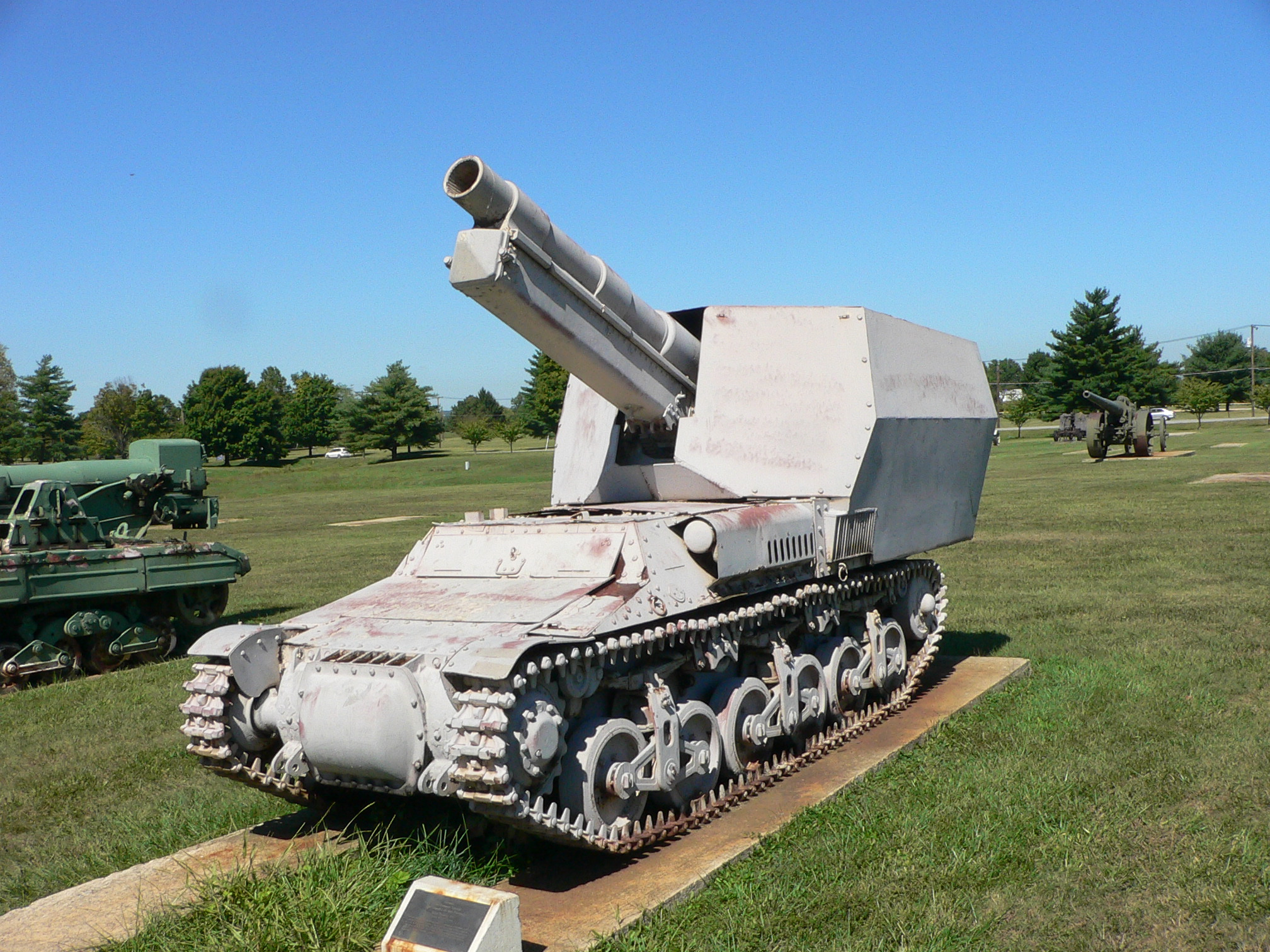
The 15cm sFH13/1 (Sf) auf Geschuetzwagen Lorraine Schlepper (f)

A considerable number of Lorraine tractors, about 360, fell into German hands. Due to its reliability, the type was well suited to the mobile tactics the Germans favoured in 1941 and 1942. They were first used as such, renamed the Lorraine Schlepper (f). As the Germans themselves had not produced a similar type, the Lorraine tractors filled a requirement for fully tracked supply vehicles as Gefechtsfeld-Versorgungsfahrzeug Lorraine 37L (f) or Munitionstransportkraftwagen auf Lorraine Schlepper. In July and August 1942, Major Alfred Becker directed the conversion of 170 of these vehicles into the 7.5 cm PaK40/1 auf Geschuetzwagen Lorraine Schlepper (f) or Marder I, a 75 mm equipped self-propelled anti-tank gun. At the same time, 106 were converted into self-propelled artillery: 94 into the 15 cm sFH13/1 (Sf) auf Geschützwagen Lorraine Schlepper (f) and twelve into the 10.5 cm leFH18(Sf) auf Geschützwagen Lorraine Schlepper (f). Also, an artillery observation vehicle was provided: the Beobachtungswagen auf Lorraine Schlepper (f), thirty of which were produced. A single conversion entailed the fitting of a Soviet 122 mm howitzer: the 12.2 cm Kanone (r) auf Geschützwagen Lorraine (f). The Germans also employed the VBCP 38L as the Lorraine 38L(f).

For a time, it has also been assumed that a 47 mm tank destroyer conversion existed: the presumed "4.7cm Pak181(f) auf PanzerJäger Lorraine Schlepper (f)", based on preserved photographs that, however, in reality depicted the French Chasseur de Chars Lorraine mentioned above, an ad hoc conversion built in June 1940.

=== German designations ===
- Lorraine Schlepper (f) - The Lorraine tractor as captured.
- Gefechtsfeld-Versorgungsfahrzeug Lorraine 37L (f) - Supply vehicle
- Munitionstransportkraftwagen auf Lorraine Schlepper - Ammunition carrier
- 7.5 cm PaK40/1 auf Geschützwagen Lorraine Schlepper (f) - 170 Marder I, a 7.5cm PaK40/1 equipped self-propelled anti-tank gun.
- 15 cm sFH13/1 (Sf) auf Geschützwagen Lorraine Schlepper (f) - 94 self-propelled artillery vehicles, mounting 15cm sFH13/1 howitzers.
- 10.5 cm leFH18 (Sf) auf Geschützwagen Lorraine Schlepper (f) - twelve self-propelled artillery vehicles, mounting 10.5cm leFH18/40 L/28 howitzers.
- Beobachtungswagen auf Lorraine Schlepper (f) - An artillery observation vehicle, thirty of which were produced.
- 12.2 cm Kanone (r) auf Geschützwagen Lorraine (f) - A single conversion mounting a Soviet 122 mm howitzer on the Lorraine chassis.

== After the war ==
Lorraine tractors were used after World War II for various experimental roles. A number were sold on the civilian market, used to carry cranes and digging equipment. However, the factory did not secure, despite lobbying, an order from the French Army, due to the fact that so much discarded Allied matériel could be obtained for free. Likewise, an attempt in 1946 to export the type to Switzerland failed. Some were listed in the army inventories for a few years after the war; the last known user was Syria. The Maurice Dufresne Museum, in Azay-le-Rideau, and the State Military Technical Museum, at Ivanovskoje, exhibit surviving vehicles of the shortened version. Two vehicles of the long version are part of the collection of the Militärhistorisches Museum der Bundeswehr at Dresden.
