= Canon de 105 court modèle 1934 Schneider =

Canon de 105 court modèle 1934
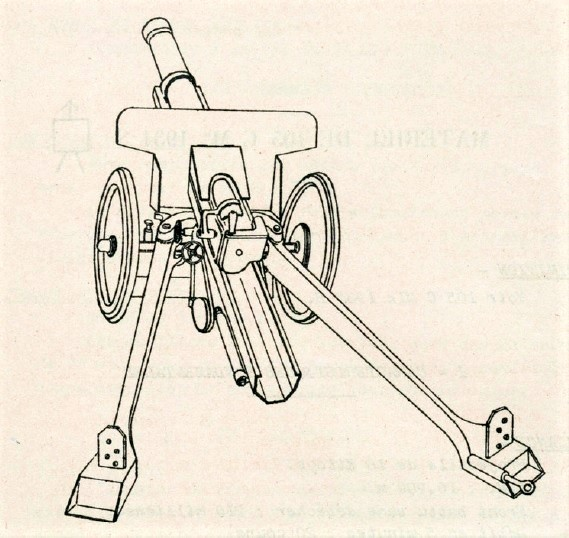
- A line drawing from Ecole d'application d'artillerie. Organisation des matériels. Tome V. Matériels usuels.
- Type: Howitzer
- Place of origin: France

Service history
- In service: 1935–1945
- Used by: France; Lithuania; Nazi Germany; Turkey
- Wars: World War II

Production history
- Designer: Schneider
- Manufacturer: Schneider
- Produced: 1935-1938

Specifications
- Mass: 1,722 kg (3,796 lb)
- Barrel length: 2.09 metres (6 ft 10 in) L/20
- Shell: 15.7 kg (35 lb)
- Caliber: 105 mm (4.1 in)
- Carriage: Split trail
- Elevation: −8° to 43°
- Traverse: 45°
- Rate of fire: 5 rpm
- Muzzle velocity: 465 m/s (1,530 ft/s)
- Maximum firing range: 10,700 metres (11,700 yd)

The Canon de 105 court modèle 1934 Schneider was a French howitzer used in World War II. It was designed by Schneider et Cie.

== Production and history ==
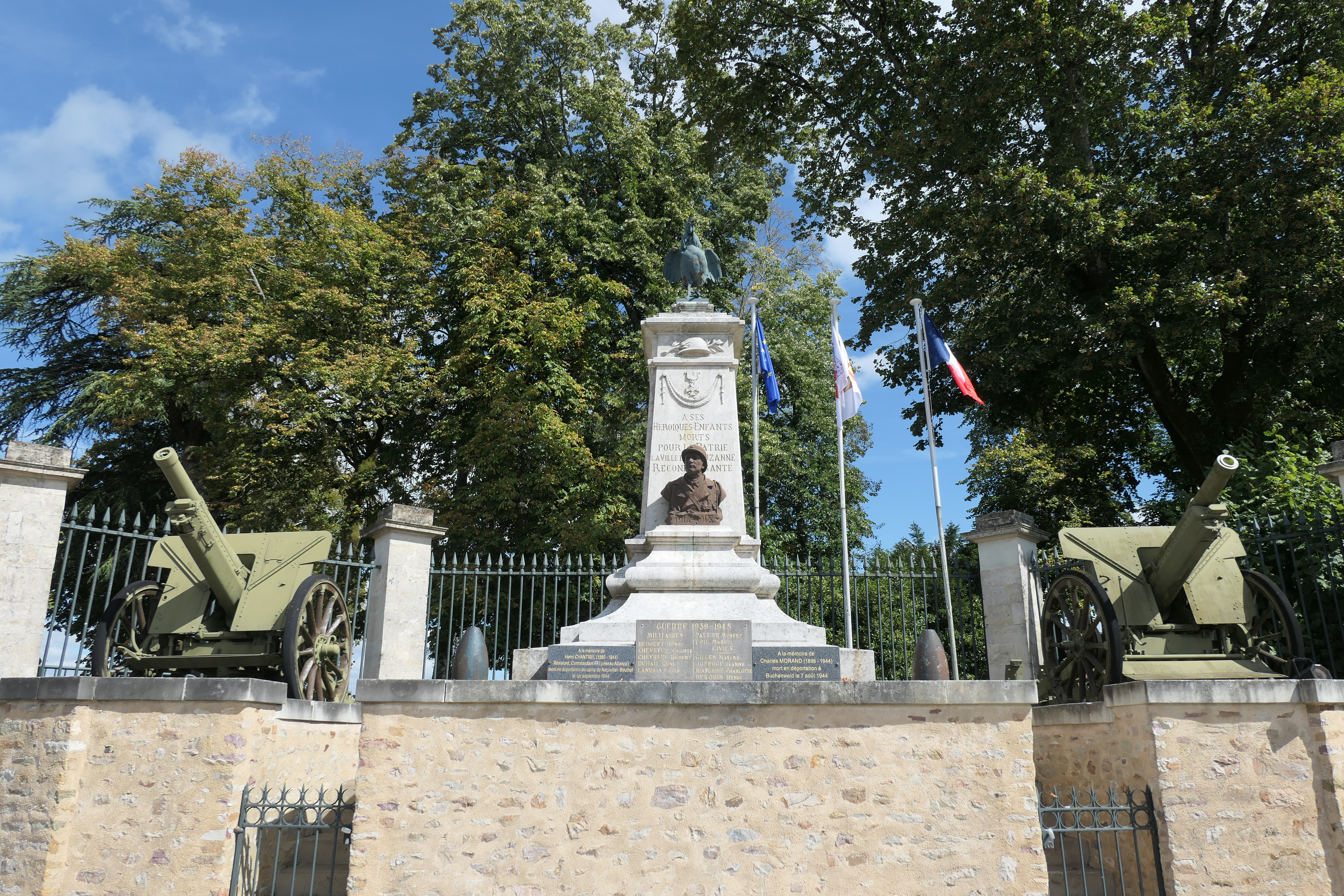
War memorial in Sainte-Suzanne-et-Chammes with two Mle 1934 howitzers.

It derived from the 105 mm howitzer produced by Schneider for the Imperial Japanese Army.

Production was slow with only 144 built from 1935 to 1938. A more conservative 105 mm howitzer design, the Canon de 105 court modèle 1935 B, was produced by the State Arsenal at Bourges, and was ordered in larger numbers. At the time of the battle of France, only 60 were in service in the artillery of the 1st and 3rd Armoured and 3rd Motorized Divisions.

=== Foreign users ===
Captured weapons were used by the German Heer as the 10.5 cm leFH 324(f). 70 105 mm howitzers mod. 1934 Schneider were bought by Lithuania (105 mm 1934 m. haubica) in 1937. In late 1939, around 12 French Army canons de 105 modèle 1934 were delivered by France to the Turkish Army.
