= Stonne =

- Commune
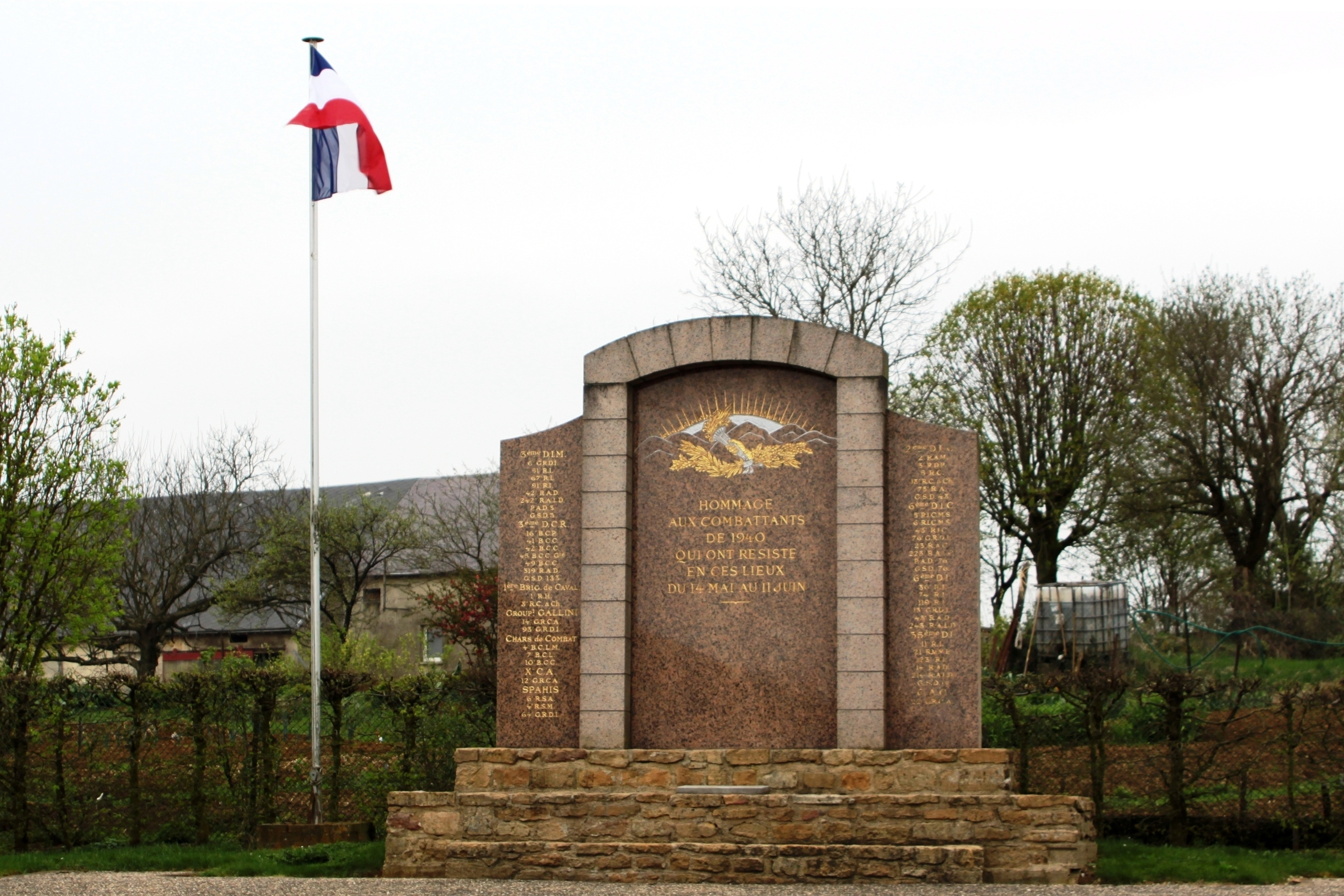
- War memorial

- Coat of arms
- Location of Stonne
- Location within France Location within Grand Est
- Coordinates: 49°33′03″N 4°55′38″E
- Country: France
- Region: Grand Est
- Department: Ardennes
- Arrondissement: Sedan
- Canton: Vouziers

Government
  - Mayor (2020–2026): William Rebisz
- Area^{1}: 7.18 km^{2} (2.77 sq mi)
- Elevation: 338 m (1,109 ft)
- Highest elevation: 340 m (1,120 ft)
- Lowest elevation: 189 m (620 ft)
- Population (2023): 40
  - Density: 5.6/km^{2} (14/sq mi)
- Time zone: UTC+01:00 (CET)
  - Summer (DST): UTC+02:00 (CEST)
- INSEE/Postal code: 08430 /08390
- ^{1} French Land Register data, which excludes lakes, ponds, glaciers > 1 km^{2} (0.386 sq mi or 247 acres) and river estuaries.

Stonne (French pronunciation: [stɔn]) is a commune in the Ardennes department in northern France.

== History ==
Stonne is a village, consisting of a handful of farmsteads, that was heavily contested during the German invasion of France in the Second World War. The village changed hands 17 times over the course of three days of fighting between 15 May and 17 May 1940.

On 13–14 May 1940, German tanks crossed the River Meuse under the command of General Heinz Guderian. The town of Stonne and the woody hills of Mont-Dieu were an area where it was possible to try to stop this German advance. On the night of 13 May, the French moved various elements to the area to attack the Germans;

- elements from the 3rd Motorized Infantry Division (DIM: Division d'Infanterie Motorisée)
  - 1st battalion of the 67th Infantry Regiment
  - 10th and 11th companies of the 51st Infantry Regiment
- elements of the 3rd DCr (Division Cuirassée)
  - 1st company of the 45th Tank Battalion (BCC: Bataillon de Chars de Combat) (Hotchkiss H-39 cavalry tanks)
  - 3rd company of the 49th Tank Battalion (BCC: Char B1bis heavy tanks)
- 2nd company of the 4th Tank Battalion (BCC: FCM-36 infantry support tanks).

They faced the 10th Panzer Division, Panzer Regiment 8, Infantry Regiment 69, Infantry Regiment "Grossdeutschland", and elements of the 43rd Assault Engineer Battalion.

The town switched sides 17 times in the course of the Battle of Stonne:

15 May

0800 German
0900 French
0930 German
1030 French
1045 German
1200 French
1730 German

16 May

0730 French
1700 German

16–17 May night

Stonne remained unoccupied

17 May

0900 German
1100 French
1430 German
1500 French
1630 German
1700 French
1745 German

At first the French tanks were used in an infantry support and defensive role. On the morning of 16 May a counter-attack was led by the French tanks. The 3rd company of the 41st Tank Battalion (Char B1 bis tanks) went into attack without infantry support. They met Panzer Regiment 8. A single B1bis tank (Lieutenant Bilotte's "Eure") pushed into the town itself, into the German defences, and then withdrew after attacking two German columns and reportedly destroying two Panzer IV tanks, 11 Panzer IIIs and two 3.7 cm PaK 36 anti-tank guns.

After 16 May, the 10th Panzer Division withdrew to be replaced by the 16th and 24th Infantry Divisions. The Infantry Regiment Grossdeutschland had already lost 570 men and 12 guns at Stonne, while the French had lost about 33 tanks and the Germans about 24 tanks. The majority of casualties suffered by Grossdeutschland regiment in the 1940 campaign were lost at Stonne.

Stonne was totally occupied only on 25 May, as pockets of resistance held out. The Germans did not clear the Mont-Dieu woods which were bypassed.

== Population ==
Historical population
Year	Pop.	±% p.a.
1968	57	—
1975	41	−4.60%
1982	39	−0.71%
1990	40	+0.32%
1999	33	−2.11%
2007	44	+3.66%
2012	46	+0.89%
2017	41	−2.28%
2023	40	−0.41%
Source: INSEE

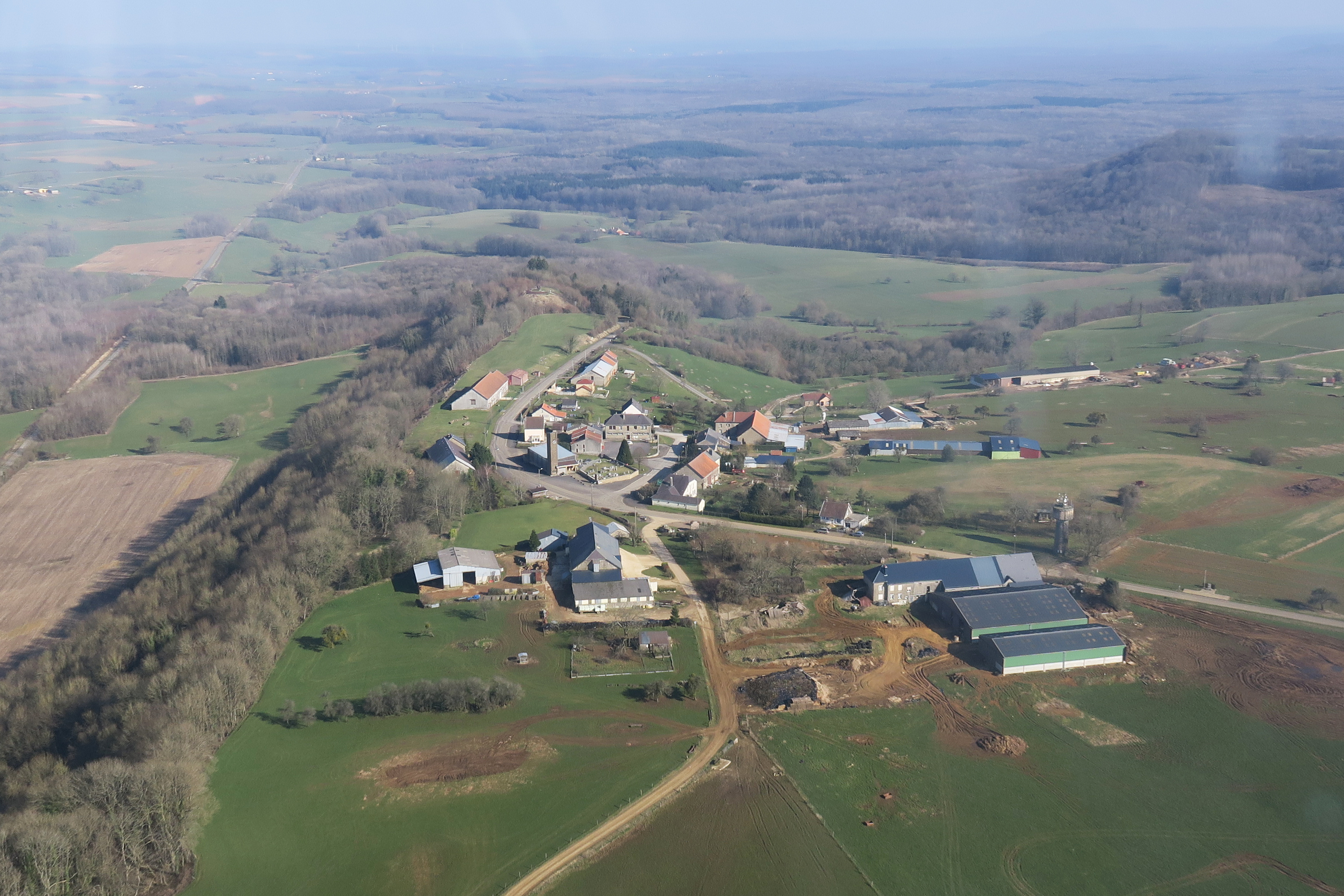
Stonne - March 2018

== See also ==
- Communes of the Ardennes department
