= Char B1 =

WW2 French heavy tank

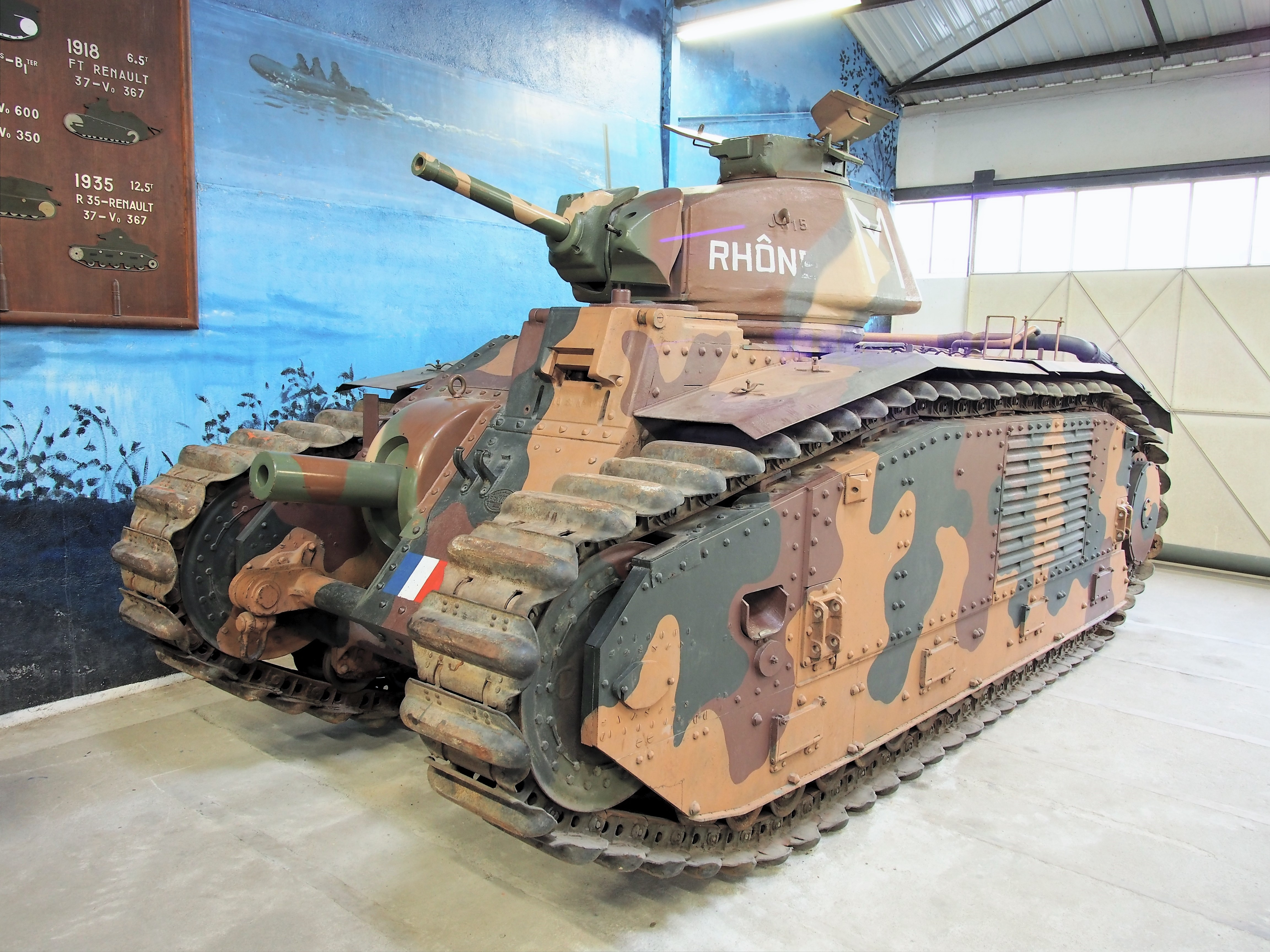
- The Char B1 bis Rhône at the Musée des Blindés at Saumur
- Type: Break-through tank, Heavy tank
- Place of origin: France

Service history
- In service: 1936–1940 (France); 1944–1945 (Free French Forces)
- Used by: France; Germany
- Wars: World War II

Production history
- Designed: 1921–1934
- Manufacturer: Renault and others
- Produced: 1935–1937 (Char B1); 1937–1940 (Char B1 bis)
- No. built: 405 (34 Char B1, 369 Char B1 bis and two Char B1 ter)

Specifications
- Mass: 28 tonnes
- Length: 6.37 m (20 ft 11 in)
- Width: 2.46 m (8 ft 1 in)
- Height: 2.79 m (9 ft 2 in)
- Crew: 4
- Armour: 40 mm (Char B1); 60 mm (Char B1 bis)
- Main armament: 75 mm ABS SA 35 howitzer
- Secondary armament: 47 mm SA 34 (Char B1); 47 mm SA 35 (Char B1 bis); 2× 7.5 mm Reibel machine guns
- Engine: Renault inline 6 cylinder 16.5 litre petrol engine 203 kW (276 PS; 272 hp)
- Power/weight: 7.2 kW (9.7 hp)/tonne
- Transmission: 5 forward, 1 reverse gear
- Suspension: bogies with a mixture of vertical coil and leaf springs
- Fuel capacity: 400 L
- Operational range: 200 km (120 mi)
- Maximum speed: 28 km/h (17 mph); 21 km/h (13 mph) off-road
- Steering system: double differential

The Char B1 was a French heavy tank manufactured before World War II.

The Char B1 was a specialised break-through vehicle, originally conceived as a self-propelled gun with a 75 mm howitzer in the hull; later a 47 mm gun in a turret was added, to allow it to function also as a Char de Bataille, a "battle tank" fighting enemy armour, equipping the armoured divisions of the Infantry Arm. Starting in the early twenties, its development and production were repeatedly delayed, resulting in a vehicle that was both technologically complex and expensive, and already obsolescent when real mass-production of a derived version, the Char B1 "bis", started in the late 1930s. A further up-armoured version, the Char B1 "ter", was only built in two prototypes.

Among the most powerfully armed and armoured tanks of its day, the type was very effective in direct confrontations with German armour in 1940 during the Battle of France, but low speed and high fuel consumption made it ill-adapted to the war of movement then being fought. After the defeat of France, captured Char B1 (bis) would be used by Germany, with some rebuilt as flamethrowers, Munitionspanzer, or mechanised artillery.

== Development and production ==
The Char B1 had its origins in the concept of a Char de Bataille conceived by General Jean Baptiste Eugène Estienne in 1919, e.g. in his memorandum Mémoire sur les missions des chars blindés en campagne. It had to be a "Battle Tank" that would be able to accomplish a breakthrough of the enemy line by destroying fortifications, gun emplacements and opposing tanks. In January 1921, a commission headed by General Edmond Buat initiated a project for such a vehicle. To limit costs, it had to be built like a self-propelled gun, with the main weapon in the hull. To minimise the vehicle size, this gun should be able to move only up and down, with the horizontal aiming to be provided by turning the entire vehicle. The specifications included: a maximum weight of thirteen tonnes; a maximum armour thickness of 25 millimetres; a hull as low as possible to enable the gun to fire into the vision slits of bunkers; a small machine gun turret to fend off enemy infantry attacks, at the same time serving as an observation post for the commander and a crew of at most three men. Two versions should be built, one a close support tank armed with a 75 mm howitzer, the other an anti-tank vehicle with a 47 mm gun instead.

French industry was very interested in the project. In the past, this had led to much non-constructive rivalry. Estienne, who in the war had personally witnessed the dismal effects of such a situation, was determined to avoid a repetition. He used his position as Inspector-General of the Tanks to enforce the so-called "Estienne accord" on the industrialists, ordering them to "reach a mutual understanding, free from any spirit of industrial competition". To be allowed to join, they had to agree beforehand to relinquish any patents to the Army, which would be free to combine all projects into a single type. In exchange, to the industry very large orders of no less than a thousand vehicles were promised.

On these conditions, four projects were started in 1921: two by a cooperation between Renault and Schneider, the SRA and the SRB; one by Forges et Aciéries de la Marine et d'Homécourt (FAMH), more commonly known as "Saint Chamond" from its location; and the last by Forges et Chantiers de la Méditerranée (FCM), the FCM 21. Renault and Schneider would each get to produce 250 units, FAMH and FCM each 125. A fifth producer, Delaunay-Belleville, whose project (an improved Renault FT) had been rejected beforehand, would be allowed to make 83 tanks; the remaining 167 would be allotted at the discretion of the French State, which would be the owner of the design.

On 13 May 1924, the four prototypes were presented at the Atelier de Rueil, where they were compared, each having to drive over a twenty kilometre test course. Immediately, it became evident that their technical development had been insufficient, most breaking down; the SRA even started to fall apart. Maintenance was difficult because the engines were inaccessible. All projects used a three-man crew but differed considerably in size, form and the solution chosen to laterally point the gun.

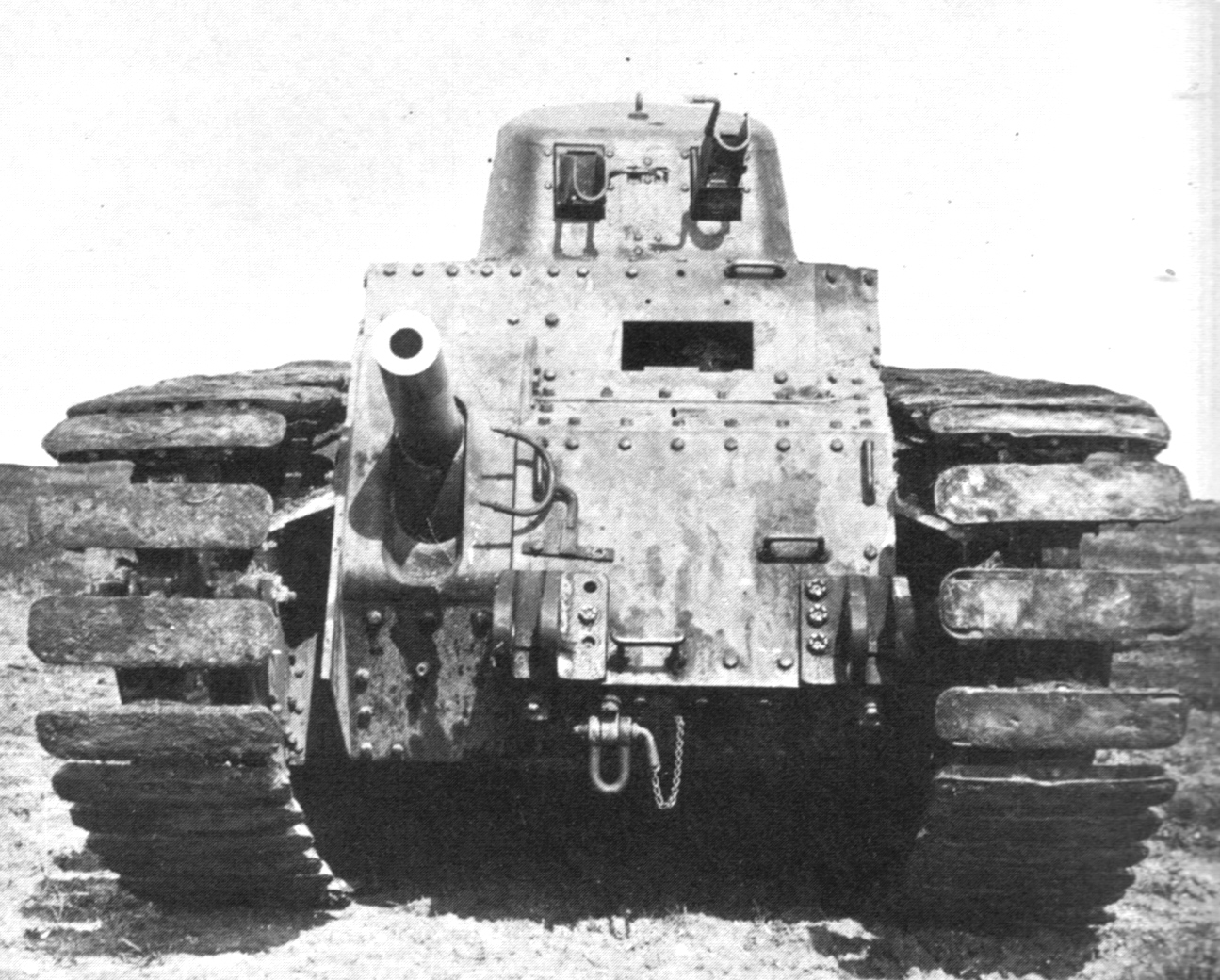
The SRA

The SRA was the heaviest vehicle at 19.5 tonnes. Its length was 5.95 metres, its height 2.26m and its width 2.49m. It had a 75 mm howitzer in the right side of the hull and a cast, 30 mm thick, turret with two machine guns. It was steered by an epicyclical transmission combined with hydraulically reinforced brake disks, which failed to provide the desired precision during tests.

Seen from the front, it was very similar to the final model, but its side-on profile was more like that of the British Medium Mark D, including the snake track-system, with the drive wheel higher than the idler in front. The suspension used leaf springs. A Renault six-cylinder 180 hp engine (a bisected V12 aircraft engine) allowed for a maximum speed of 17.5 km/h; a four hundred litre fuel tank for a range of 140 kilometres.

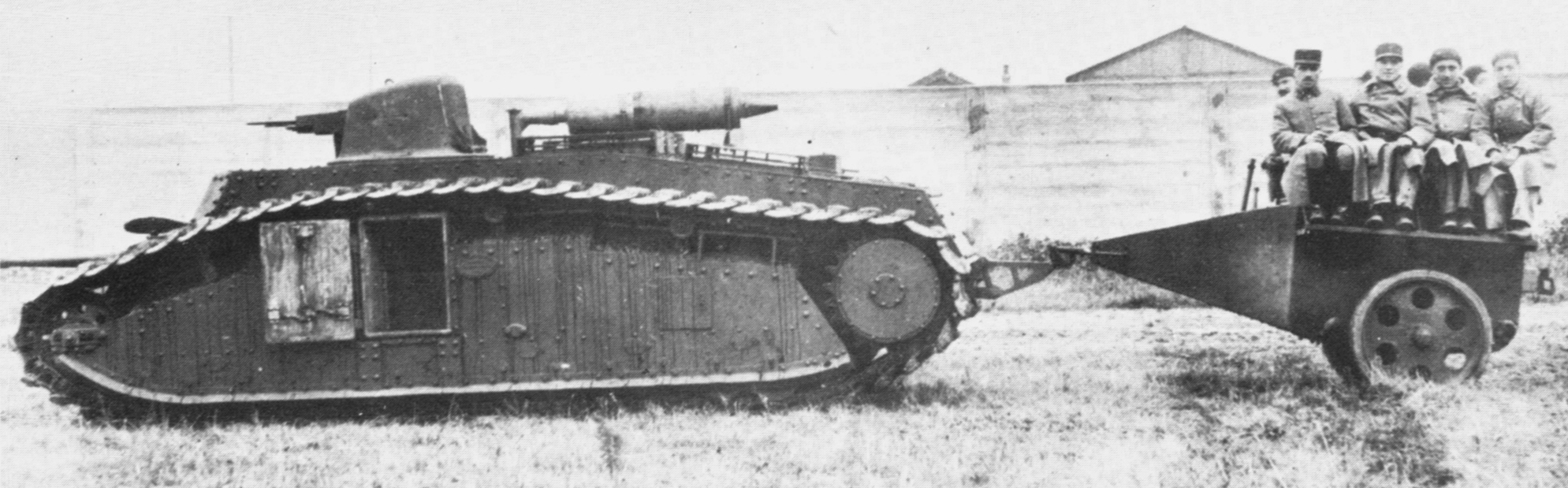
The SRB with fuel trailer

The SRB, also using leaf springs, was a somewhat larger vehicle, six metres long, 2.28 metres high and 2.5 metres wide. It was nevertheless lighter at 18.5 tonnes, a result of having a smaller 47 mm gun—it thus was the antitank version. Using the same engine, its speed was accordingly slightly higher at 18 km/h. More limited fuel reservoirs holding 370 litres decreased the range to 125 kilometres. It used an advanced hydraulic suspension system and the hydraulic Naeder-transmission from the Chaize company combined with a Fieux clutch and Schneider gear box. It used modified Renault FT tracks. The upper track run was much higher, creating enough room for a side door on the left.

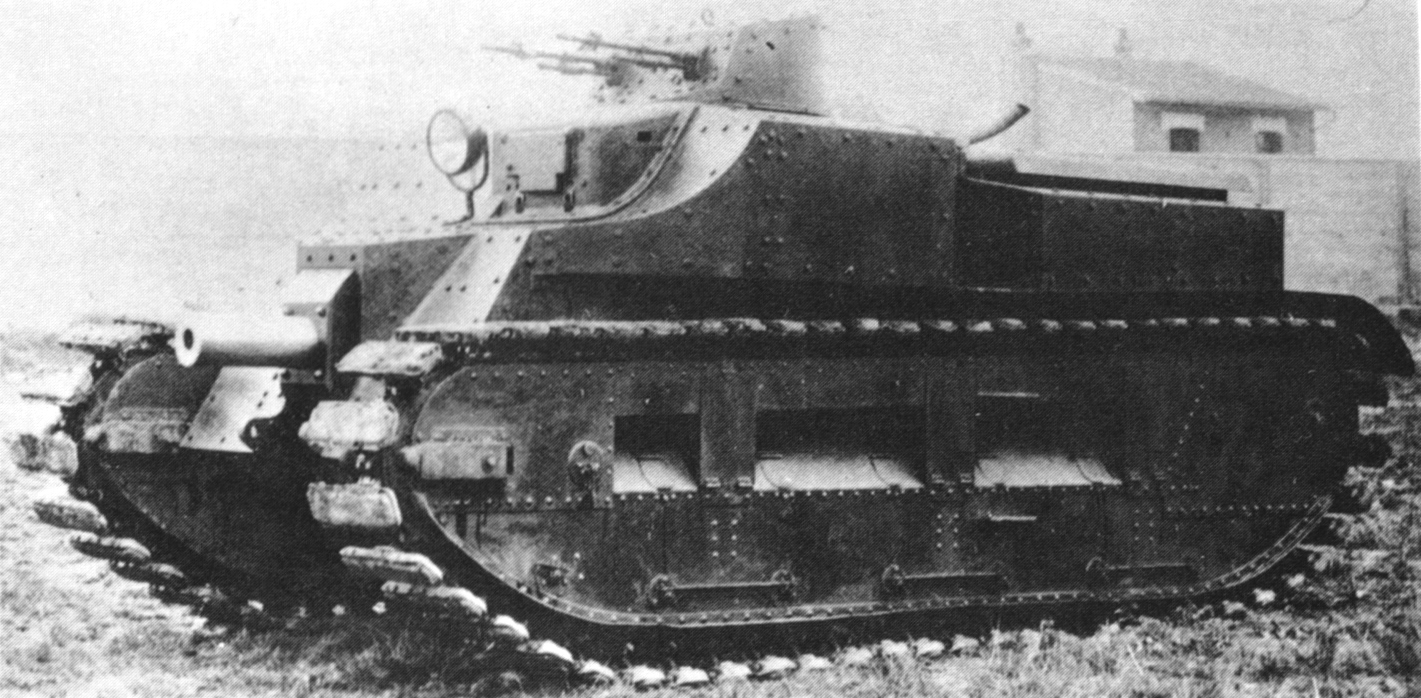
The FAHM prototype

The FAHM prototype was 5.2 metres long, 2.4 m high and 2.43 m wide. It used a hydropneumatic suspension. Despite a less powerful Panhard engine of 120 hp, it still attained a speed of 18.2 km/h. Fuel reservoirs of just 230 litres limited its range to a mere seventy kilometres. The 75 mm howitzer was placed in the middle of the hull and steered by providing each snake track with its own hydraulic Jeanny transmission. On top, there was a riveted machine gun turret with 25 mm armour.

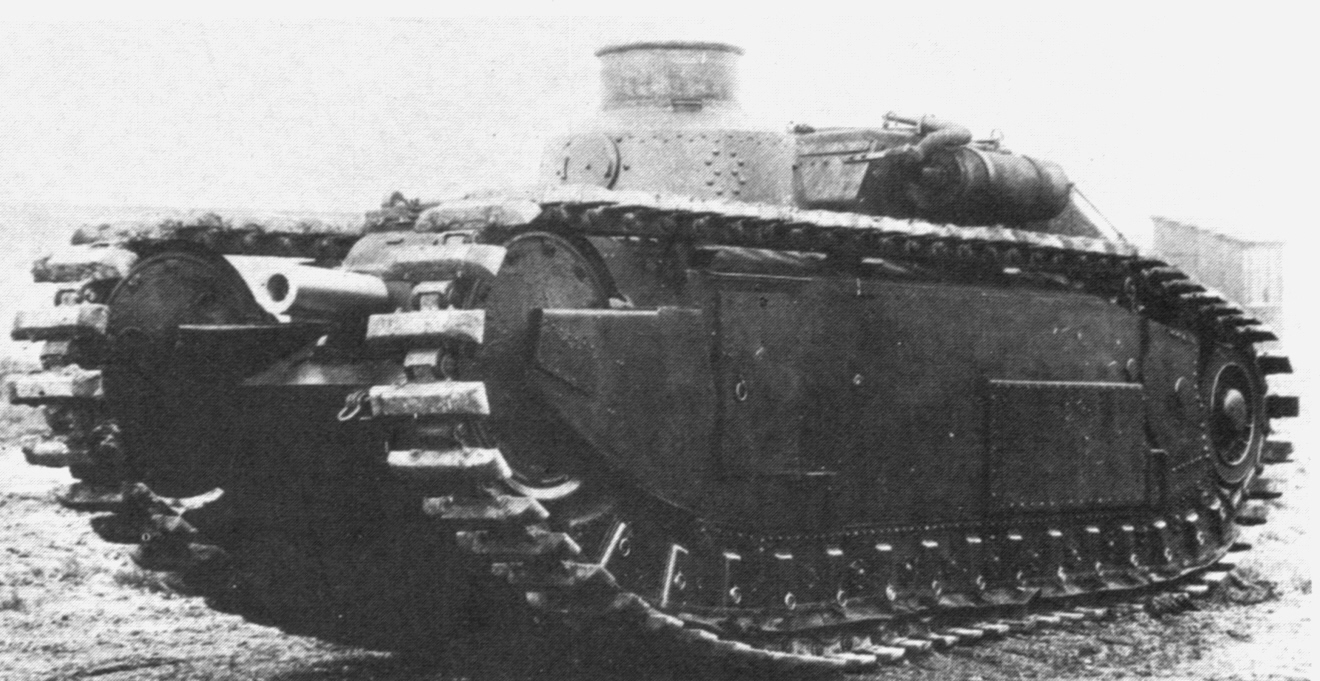
The FCM 21

The lightest prototype was the FCM 21 at 15.64 tonnes. It resembled a scaled-down Char 2C, the giant tank produced by the same company. It was very elongated with a length of 6.5 metres and width of 2.05 metres. A rather large riveted turret with a stroboscopic cupola, adopted from the Char 2C, brought its height to 2.52 metres. Like the superheavy tank, it had no real spring system for the twelve small wheels per side. Separate clutches for each snake track enabled it to horizontally point the 75 mm howitzer in the middle of the hull. It used the same Panhard engine as the FAHM type and its speed was the lowest of all at 17.4 km/h. However, its 500-litre fuel tanks allowed for the best range, at 175 kilometres.

In March 1925, Estienne decided to base the future production type on the SRB, as regarded the general form and mechanical parts. However, it would be fitted with the 75 mm gun, a Holt-track to be developed by FCM, which company had completed a special research programme aimed at optimising weight distribution, and the FAMH-suspension (later this would again be discarded). Estienne also had some special requirements: a track tension wheel should be fitted, adjustable from the inside, and a small gangway from the fighting room should improve the accessibility of the engine compartment. Furthermore, the front armour should be increased to 40 millimetres.

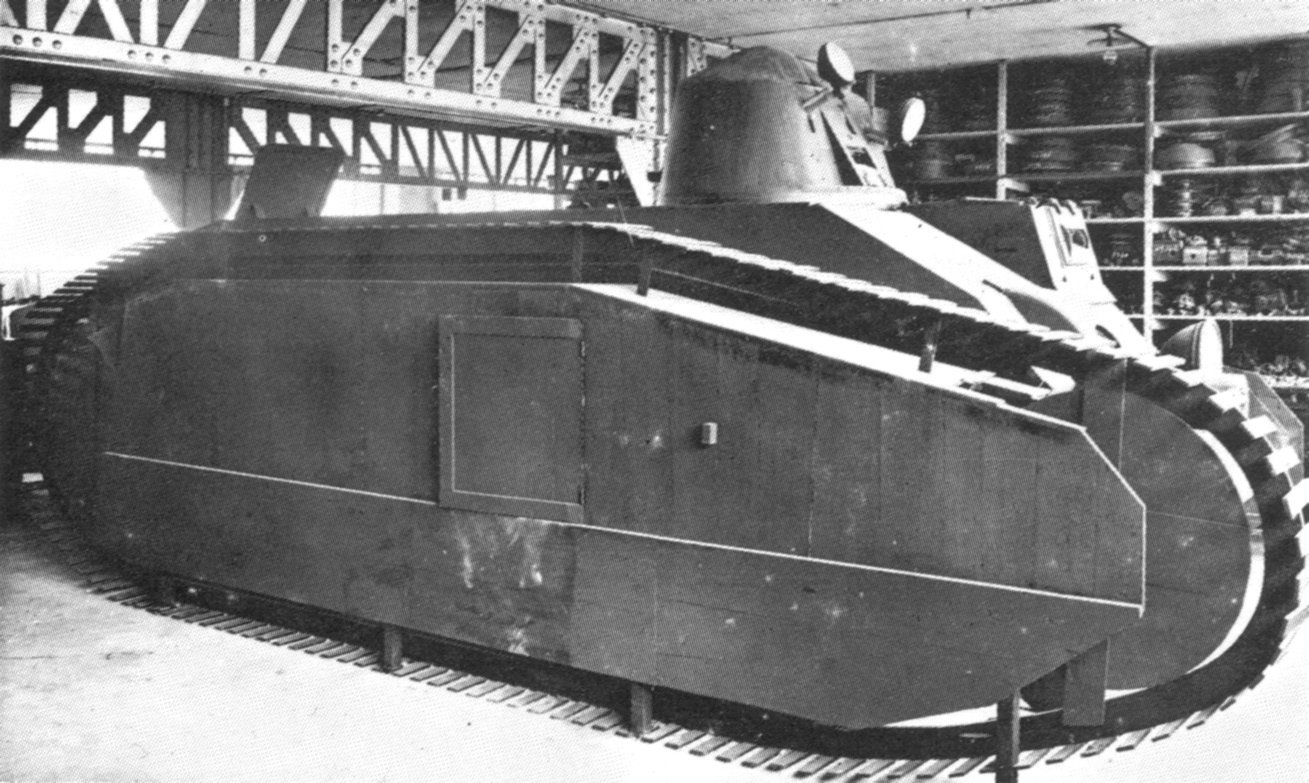
The wooden mock-up

In November 1925, Renault was given the order to build a wooden mock-up, that was finished early 1926. On 27 January 1926, it was decided to build three prototypes of what was provisionally called a Tracteur 30, a final design by engineer Alleaume of the Schneider company, cooperating with the Section Technique des Chars de Combat (STCC). The first was to be delivered by Renault, the other two by FCM and FAHM respectively.

The same year, the Direction de l'Infanterie in the Plan 1926 redefined the concept of a Char de Bataille. There would be a greater emphasis on infantry support, implying that the antitank-capacity was secondary and no armour increase was necessary. The weight was to be limited to 22 tonnes and the speed might be as low as 15 km/h. However, a radio set would have to be fitted to better direct and coordinate its actions; therefore a fourth crew-member was needed.

On 18 March 1927, the contracts for the three prototypes were signed. The hull of first Renault vehicle, made of soft boiler plate instead of armour steel to simplify changes, was finished apart from the armament in January 1929; it was delivered in March. The separately produced cast turret was delivered on 23 April. The howitzer could only be fitted in April 1930. This prototype was allotted the series number No. 101. No. 102, the production of which FAMH had shifted to Renault, was delivered soon after; in September 1930 FCM delivered No. 103, constructed by the Atelier de Mépanti at Marseille. One of the vehicles was fitted with an alternative 75 mm Schneider gun instead of the 75 mm St Chamond M 21 from FAMH.

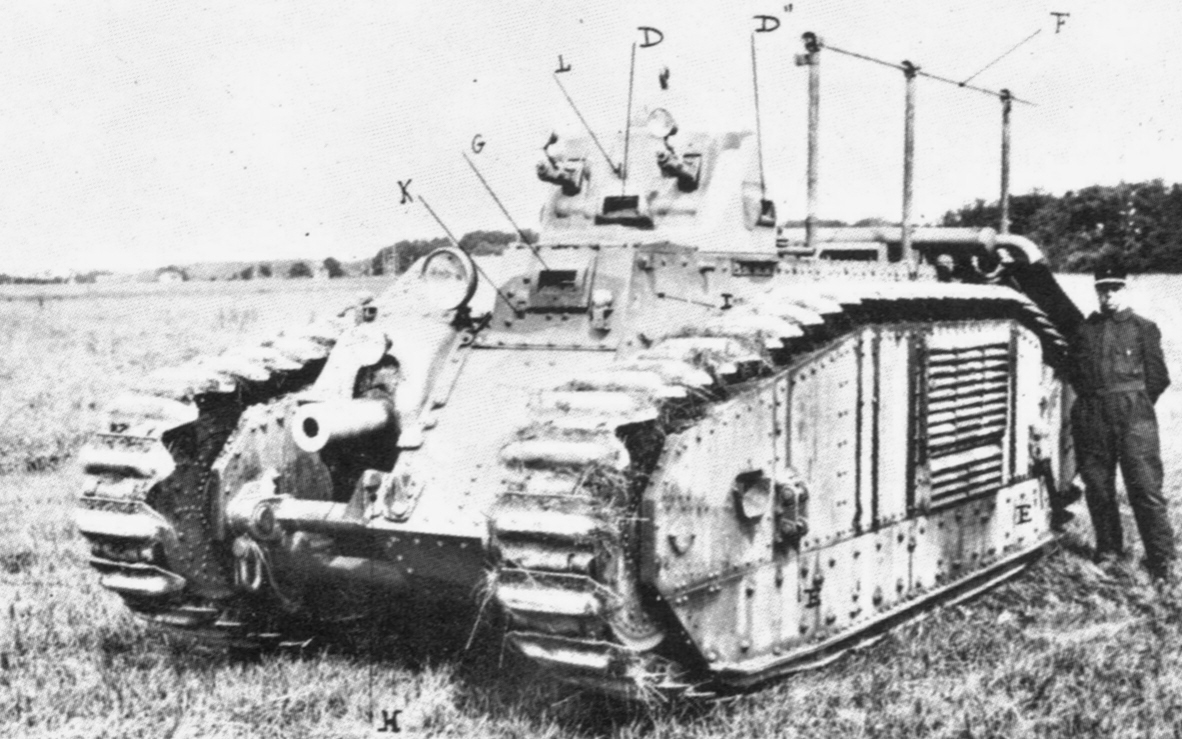
Prototype No. 101, here in its original state with a small machine gun turret

Testing on the first prototype had already begun before the other two were delivered, or even its main armament was fitted. At 24,750 kg (24.36 long tons) the weight was more than specified but could nevertheless reach a top speed of 24 km/h (15 mph). From 6 May until August 1930, the Commission d'Experiences des Matériels de Chars carried out a further test programme on what was now officially called the Char B—the "B" not referring to Bataille but to a general classification code. The commission was largely satisfied with the vehicle, though many smaller problems were detected that had to be improved. The FCM prototype featured several alternative technologies: a Winterthur transmission, a Citroën clutch and a Sulzer diesel engine, later replaced by a Clerget diesel. All of these systems would prove to be more unreliable than the original concept and were ultimately rejected.

The three vehicles were not only used for technological, but also tactical experimentation. Together with the Char D1 pre-series, they represented the only modern tanks in France and the Army was naturally very interested in what lessons could be learned from them about future warfare, outlining the concept of a Char de Manoeuvre. Neither Char de Bataille nor Char de Manoeuvre are official type designations; they refer to the tactical concepts only. In October 1931, a small unit was formed, the Détachement d' Experimentation in which the prototypes were united from December, using the Camp de Châlons as a base to see how they could be used in winter conditions. Afterwards, they drove on their own power to the Atelier de Rueil for repairs. In September, they took part in the summer manoeuvres in Champagne as a Détachement Mécanique de Combat; from 4 May 1933 No. 102 and 103 together formed a Détachement d'Engins Blindés to perform tactical experiments in the army bases of Coëtquidan and Mourmelon as part of a motorised light division, followed by comparable experiments in April 1934 at Sissonne. Technical aspects were not forgotten during these tests and it was established they could attain an average road speed of 19 km/h, cross a trench 2.4 m (7.9 ft) wide, and wade through a 105 cm (41 in) deep stream.

The prototypes were again extensively altered to meet changes in specifications. On 6 April 1934, the first order was made for seven tanks of a Char B1. The "B1" refers to the fact that there were other simultaneous projects to develop improved types: the Char B2, B3 and B B.

The Char B1 was manufactured by several firms: Renault (182), AMX (47), FCM (72), FAMH (70) and Schneider (32). Although it was the main producer, Renault had not exclusively designed the tank. Therefore, the official name was not Renault B1 as often erroneously given. It was a very expensive tank to build: the cost per vehicle was about 1.5 million French francs. In France, at the time, two schools of thought collided: the first wanted to build very powerful heavy tanks, the other a lot of cheap light tanks. Both sides managed to influence procurement policy to the end that not enough tanks were built of either category, to the exasperation of men like Colonel Charles de Gaulle, who wanted to build more of the medium Char D2 at a third of the cost of the Char B1 bis, but with the same 47 mm anti-tank gun.

== Tactical function ==
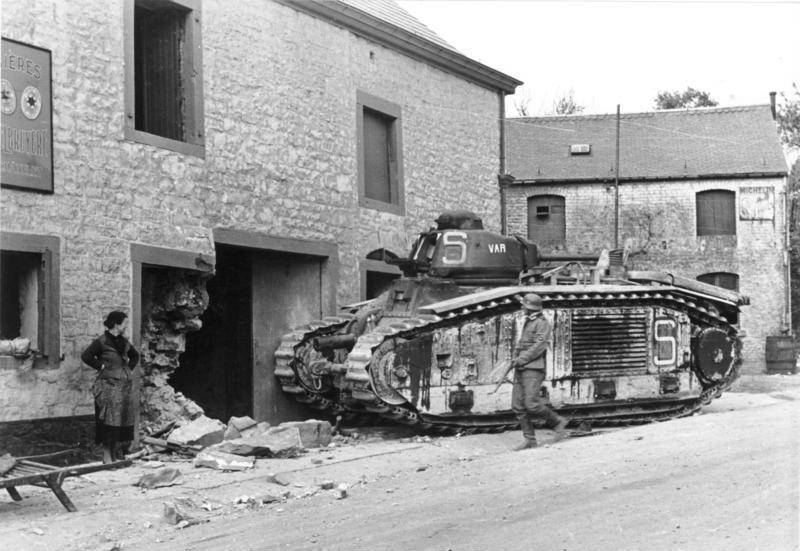
B1 bis, No. 323, Var captured in Belgium after being abandoned because of a broken steering mechanism. Var was from the 3rd Platoon, 2nd Company of the 37th BCC, 1re DCr.

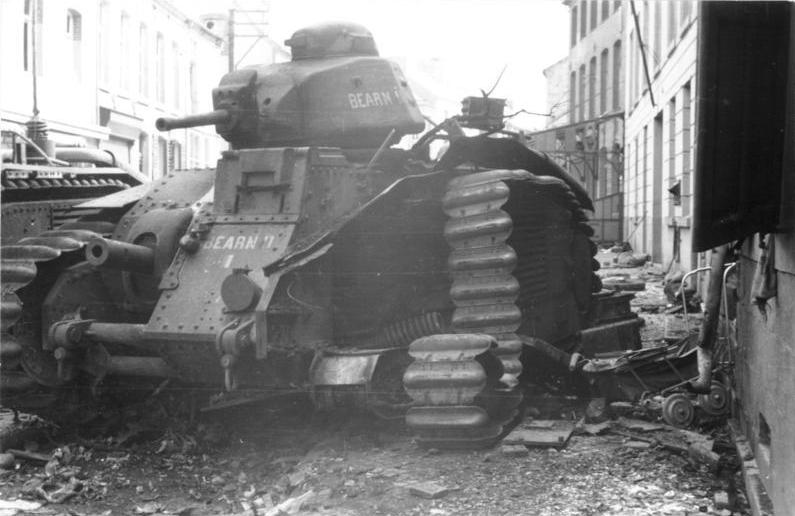
B1 bis, No. 401, Bearn II after being destroyed by its crew, one of the two 37th BCC replacement vehicles, earlier named Vaux

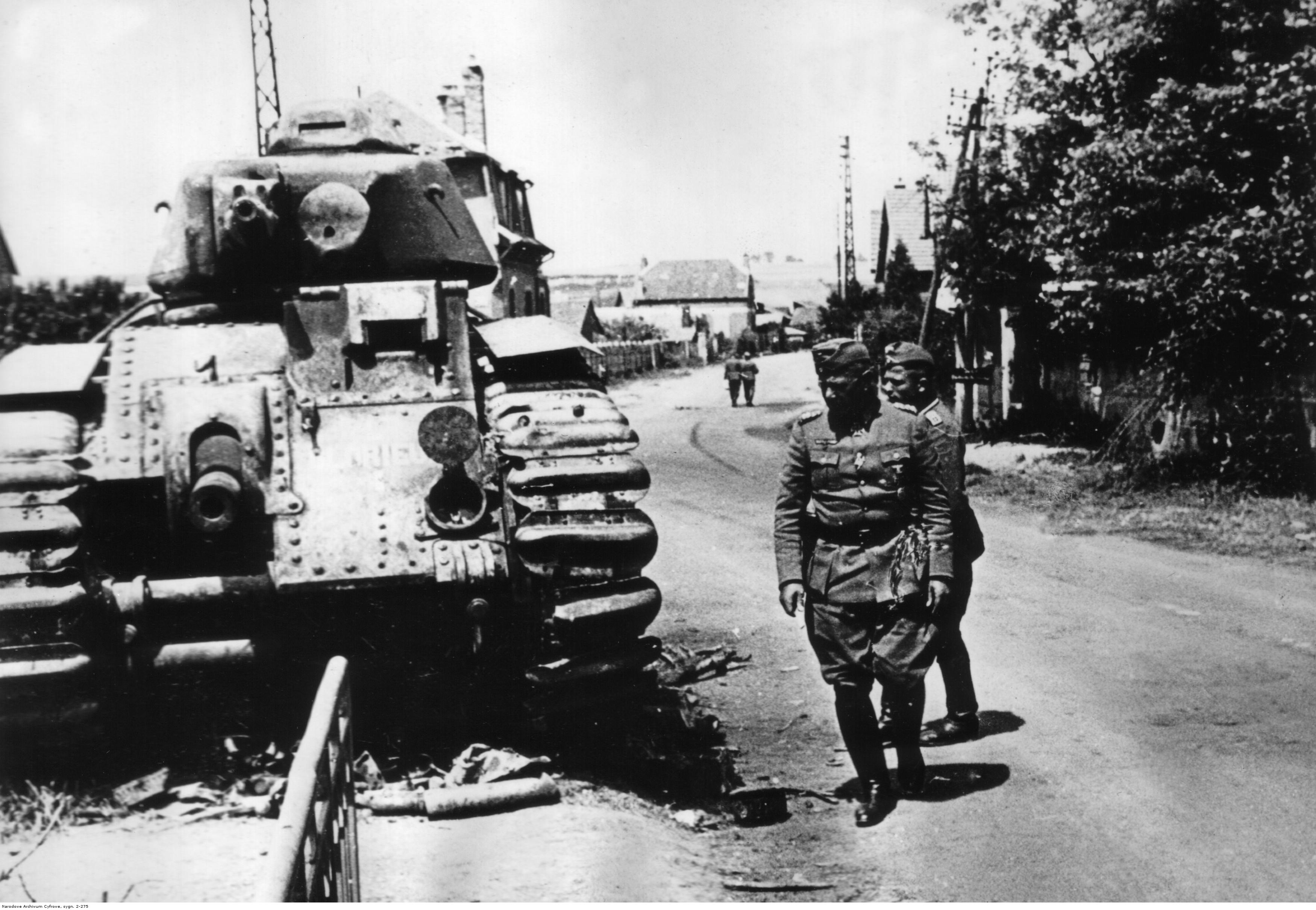
General Walther von Reichenau inspects a destroyed Char B1 bis (No. 236, Le Glorieux), May 1940.

The outer appearance of the Char B1 reflected the fact that development started in the twenties: like the very first tank, the British Mark I tank of World War I, it still had large tracks going around the entire hull and large armour plates protecting the suspension—and like all tanks of that decade it had no welded or cast hull armour. The similarity resulted partly from the fact that the Char B1 was a specialised offensive weapon, a break-through tank optimised for punching a hole into strong defensive entrenchments, so it was designed with good trench-crossing capabilities. The French Army thought that dislodging the enemy from a key front sector would decide a campaign, and it prided itself on being the only army in the world having a sufficient number of adequately protected heavy tanks. The exploitation phase of a battle was seen as secondary and best carried out by controlled and methodical movement to ensure superiority in numbers, so for the heavy tanks also mobility was of secondary concern. Although the Char B1 had a reasonably good speed for the time of its conception, no serious efforts were made to improve it when much faster tanks appeared.

More important than the tank's limitations in tactical mobility, however, were its limitations in strategic mobility. The low practical range implied the need to refuel very often, limiting its operational capabilities. This again implied that the armoured divisions of the Infantry, the Divisions Cuirassées, were not very effective as a mobile reserve and thus lacked strategic flexibility. They were not created to fulfill such a role in the first place, which was reflected in the small size of the artillery and infantry components of the divisions. To alleviate this problem, already in the prototype stage an eight hundred litres fuel trailer had been developed.

=== The one-man turret ===
Another explanation of the similarity to the British Mark I lies in the Char B1's original specification to create a self-propelled gun able to destroy enemy infantry and artillery. The main weapon of the tank was its 75 mm howitzer, and the entire design of the vehicle was directed to making this gun as effective as possible. When, in the early 1930s, it became obvious that the Char B1 also had to defeat counterattacking enemy armour, it was too late for a complete redesign. The solution was to add the standard cast APX-1 turret which also equipped the Char D2. Like most French tanks of the period (the exception being the AMC 34 and AMC 35), the Char B thus had a small one-man turret. Today, this is typically seen as one of their greatest flaws. The commander, alone in the turret, not only had to command the tank, but also to aim and load the gun. If he was a unit leader, he had to command his other tanks as well. This is in contrast with the contemporary German, British and to a lesser extent (Note: Note the mixture of the commander-gunner roles on early-war T-34 models.) Soviet policy to use two or three-man turret crews, in which these duties were divided amongst several men. The other nations felt that the commander would otherwise be over-tasked and unable to perform any of his roles as well as the commanders of tanks with two or three-man turret crews.

Whether this left the Char B1 less formidable in actual combat than a review of its impressive statistics suggests, is difficult to ascertain. In 1940, the vast majority of Char B1 combat losses were inflicted by German artillery and anti-tank guns. In direct meetings with German tanks, the Char B1 usually had the better of it, sometimes spectacularly so as when on 16 May a single tank, Eure (commanded by Captain Pierre Billotte), frontally attacked and destroyed thirteen German tanks lying in ambush in Stonne, all of them Panzer IIIs and Panzer IVs, in the course of a few minutes. The tank safely returned despite being hit 140 times. Similarly, in his book Panzer Leader, Heinz Guderian related an incident that took place during a tank battle south of Juniville: "While the tank battle was in progress I attempted, in vain, to destroy a Char B with a captured 47 mm. anti-tank gun; all the shells I fired at it simply bounced harmlessly off its thick armour. Our 37 mm. and 20 mm. guns were equally ineffective against this adversary. As a result, we inevitably suffered sadly heavy casualties."

The French favoured small turrets despite their shortcomings, as they allowed for much smaller and thus cheaper vehicles. Although the French expenditure on tanks was relatively larger than the German, France simply lacked the production capacity to build a sufficient number of heavier tanks. The Char B1 was expensive enough as it was, eating up half of the infantry tank budget.

== Variants ==
=== Char B1 ===
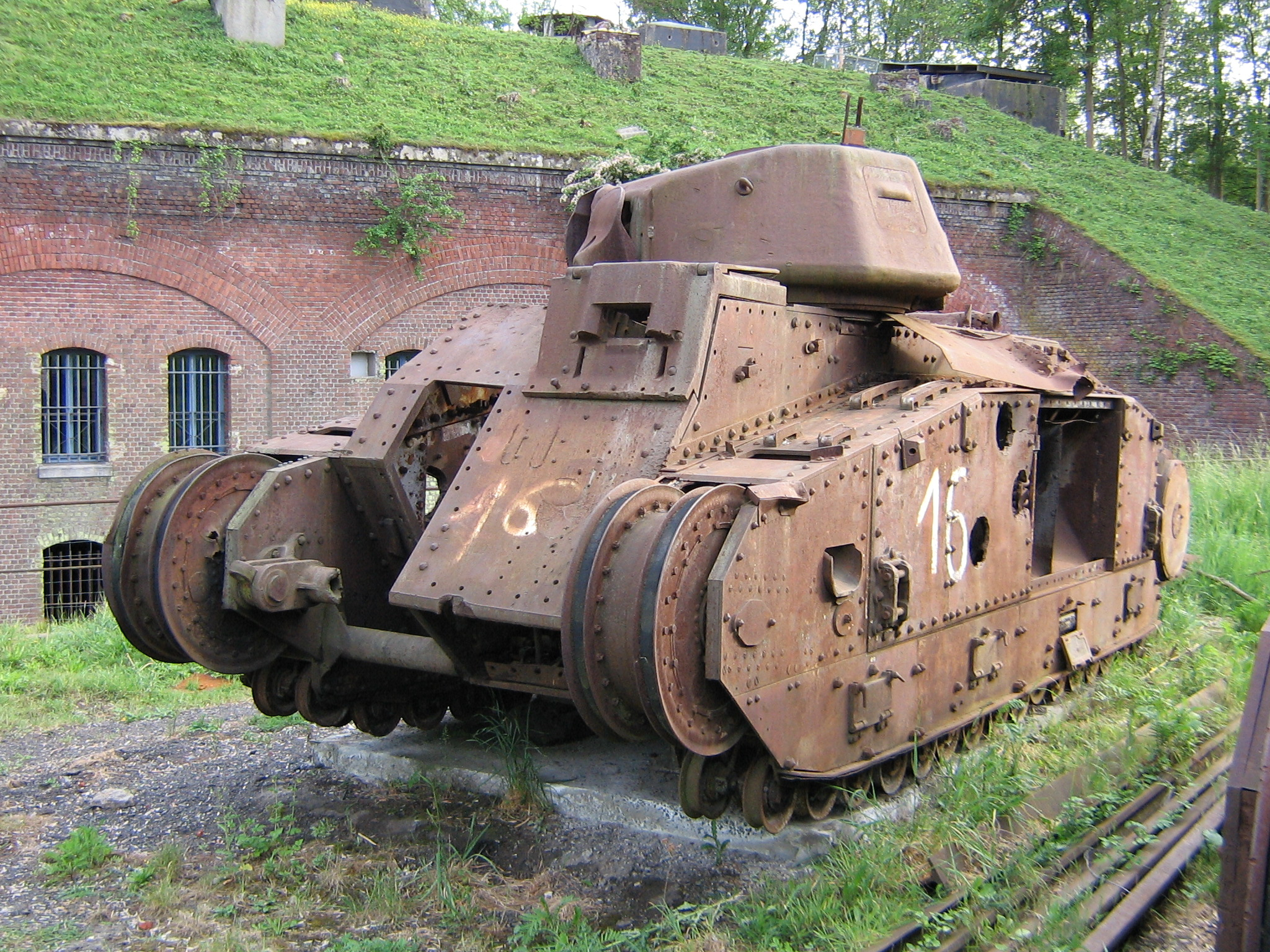
The wreck of the last surviving Char B1 at Fort de Seclin, Seclin, France (2007)

The original Char B1 had frontal and side armour up to 40 mm thick. It had a length of 637 centimetres (689 cm including the tail), a width of 2.5 metres, and a height of 279 centimetres. The vehicle had a fully traversing APX1 turret with a 47 mm L/27.6 SA 34 gun. This had a poor anti-tank capability: the thirty Armour Piercing High Explosive (APHE) rounds among the fifty 47 mm shells the tank carried had a maximum penetration of about 25 mm. In addition, it was armed with a 75 mm ABS 1929 SA 35 gun mounted in the right-hand side of the hull front and two 7.5 mm Châtellerault M 1931 machine guns: one in the hull and the other in the turret; 4,800 machine gun rounds were carried. The hull machine gun was to the right of the 75mm gun, in a fixed mount. It was invisible from the outside of the tank, and, due to being fixed, had very little use. The 75 mm L/17.1 gun, able to fire both a High Explosive and the APHE Obus de rupture Modèle 1910M round, had a limited traverse of only one degree to the left or the right. It was laid onto target by the driver (provided with the gun sight) through the Naeder hydraulic precision transmission. (Note: This later inspired Sven Berge's design of the Swedish Stridsvagn 103, having read about German trials with the type during 1940) The traverse had been made possible only in order to align the gun barrel precisely with the sight beforehand. The 75 mm gun had its own loader—the remaining two crew members were the radio operator and the commander, who had to load, aim and fire the 47 mm gun while commanding the vehicle (and in the case of platoon leaders, command other vehicles as well). The fighting compartment had the radio set on the left and an exit hatch in the right side. All vehicles had the ER53 radiotelegraphy set, so all communication was in Morse code only. A hatch in the rear bulkhead gave access to a corridor (under which nineteen 75 mm rounds out of a total of eighty were stowed) in the engine room to the right of the engine, which was officially rated at 250 hp (190 kW), but had an actual output of 272 hp (203 kW). Each tank had its own support team of three mechanics; in battle some of these might join the regular crew. There was room to accommodate eight men in total.

The suspension was very complex, with sixteen road wheels per side. There were three large central bogies, sprung by a vertical coil spring. Each central bogie carried two smaller ones. The three vertical springs moved through holes in a horizontal beam, to both extreme ends of which road wheels were attached by means of leaf springs: three at the front and one at the back. The high track run gave the tank an old-fashioned look, reflecting its long development time. It had a maximum speed of 28 km/h and a loaded weight of 27.195 tonnes. The range was about two hundred kilometres, made possible by a fuel reservoir of four hundred litres. A total of 34 vehicles were built from December 1935 until July 1937. They had series numbers 102 to 135. Chassis number 101 was kept apart to build the Char B1 ter prototype.

=== Char B1 bis ===
The Char B1 bis was an upgraded variant with thicker armour at 60 mm maximum (55 mm at the sides causing an increased width of 258 cm) and an APX4 turret with a longer-barrelled (L/32) 47 mm SA 35 gun, to give the tank a real anti-tank capability. It was the main production type: from 8 April 1937 until June 1940, 369 units were delivered out of a total order for 1144, with series numbers 201 to 569. Before the war, production was slow: only 129 had been delivered by 1 September 1939. The monthly delivery was still not more than fifteen in December; it peaked in March 1940 with 45. At that time, it was planned to provide a company per month to the British Expedition Force.

The Char B1 bis had a top speed of 25 km/h (16 mph) provided by a 307 bhp (229 kW) petrol engine. The first batch of 35 Char B1 bis used the original engine but from 1938 to May 1940 they were slowly re-equipped. Its weight was about 31.5 tonnes. The operational range was about 180 km (110 mi) which was similar to other tanks of the period. At 20 km/h (12 mph) the three fuel tanks (total capacity of 400 L (88 imp gal)) would be exhausted in six hours. To improve matters, at first, trailers with an 800-litre auxiliary fuel tank were towed but this practice was soon abandoned, together with the trailer hooks at the rear. Instead, Char B1 units included a large number of fuel trucks and TRC Lorraine 37 L armoured tracked refuelling vehicles specially designed to quickly refuel them. The last tanks to be produced in June had an extra internal 170 L (37 imp gal) fuel tank. To cool the more powerful engine, the Char B1 bis had the air intake on the left side enlarged. It is often claimed this formed a weak spot in the armour, based on an incident on 16 May near Stonne where two German 37 mm Pak guns claimed to have knocked out three Char B1s by firing at the intakes at close range. The air intake was a 6-inch (150 mm) thick assembly of horizontal slits alternately angled upwards and downwards between 28 mm thick armour plates, and as such intended to be no more vulnerable than the normal 55 mm side plates. Nevertheless, this feature was abandoned in the Char B1 ter.

Over the production run, the type was slowly improved. Tanks numbered 306 to 340 carried 62 47-mm rounds (and the old complement of 4,800 machine gun rounds); later tanks had 72 and 5,250 respectively. However, the B1 bis had fewer 75 mm rounds compared to the earlier B1 : 74 instead of 80, normally only seven of which were APHE ammunition. Early in 1940, another change was made when the ER53 radio was replaced by the ER51, which allowed spoken wireless communication. The company and battalion command tanks also had an ER55 for communication with higher command. However, the crews of the 1re DCR kept their old sets, preferring them because the human voice was drowned by engine noise.

=== Char B1 ter ===
Development of the Char B1 ter was started in January 1935 and based on the numero 101 prototype. The project was motivated by a desire to escape the Estienne accords, allowing the State to choose the manufacturer it preferred. Also, it was hoped to simplify production while at the same time improving the protection level. It was the intention to provide a tank armoured to 75mm. In the 1935 prototype, a new gear box and transmission was fitted, developed by ARL. The design showed a raised engine deck, probably for the more powerful engine, though a raised deck was ultimately not adopted in the Char B1 ter.

In 1937, the Inspecteur des Chars, general Pol-Maurice Velpry who had been closely involved in the development of the armour of the Char B1 bis, began a second project. This was a new vehicle, though some components of prototype 101 were reused. A design with sloped and welded 70 mm armour, weighing 36.6 tonnes and powered by a 350 hp (260 kW) engine was meant to replace the B1 bis to accelerate mass production, a change first intended for the summer of 1940 and later postponed to March 1941, the Char B1 ter to replace the Char B1 bis on the production lines from the 1134th vehicle onwards. It would then be fitted with a new ARL 2 polygonal welded turret. In the course of the redesign, space was provided for a fifth crew member, a "mechanic". He could also help as a gunner, because cost was reduced by omitting the complex Naeder transmission and giving the hull gun a traverse of five degrees to each side instead, in a ball-mount. The first prototype was shown in December 1937. Additional vehicles were built by Fives-Lilles and FCM, to provide a smal preseries for testing. Contrary to the Char B1 bis, the fenders ware armoured, fully enclosing the upper trackrun. The fender was connected to the side armour, consisting of three plates inclined towards each other under angles of 25% in a zig-zag profile.

Only the three prototypes could be partly finished before the defeat of France. In May 1940, it was agreed to deliver nine Char B1s each month to Britain in exchange for a monthly British production of the "H 39". The three prototypes were lost after having been evacuated on 17 June 1940, their ship the Mécanicien Principal Carvin being bombed by the Germans in the Gironde on 21 June.

== Operational history ==
=== French service ===
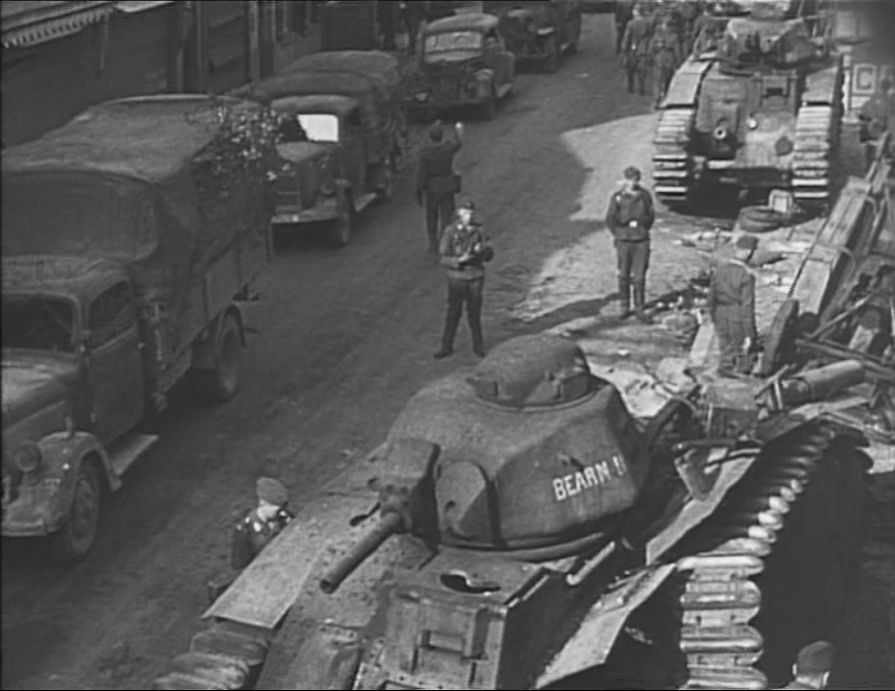
Char B1 bis of 1 DCR destroyed by their crews at Beaumont in May 1940

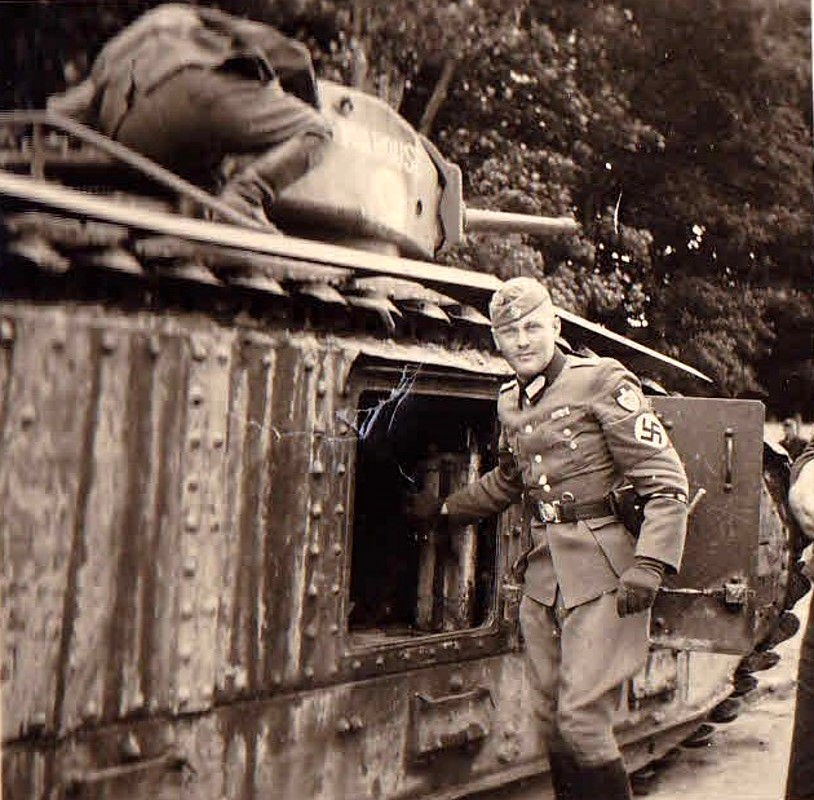
An older B1 tank, re-armed with a SA 35 gun, destroyed near Orléans in June 1940.

The Char B1 served with the armoured divisions of the infantry, the Divisions Cuirassées (DCr). These were highly specialised offensive units, to break through fortified positions. The mobile phase of a battle was to be carried out by the Divisions Légères Mécaniques (mechanised light divisions) of the cavalry, equipped with the SOMUA S35. The First and Second DCR had 69 Char B1s each; the Third 68. The 37th Bataillon de Chars de Combat, serving with 1DCR, was at first equipped with the original B1; these vehicles were refitted with the longer SA 35 gun in the spring of 1940 and the turret renamed to APX1A. The battalion was re-equipped with the Char B1 bis and, in late May, reinforced by five of the original tanks.

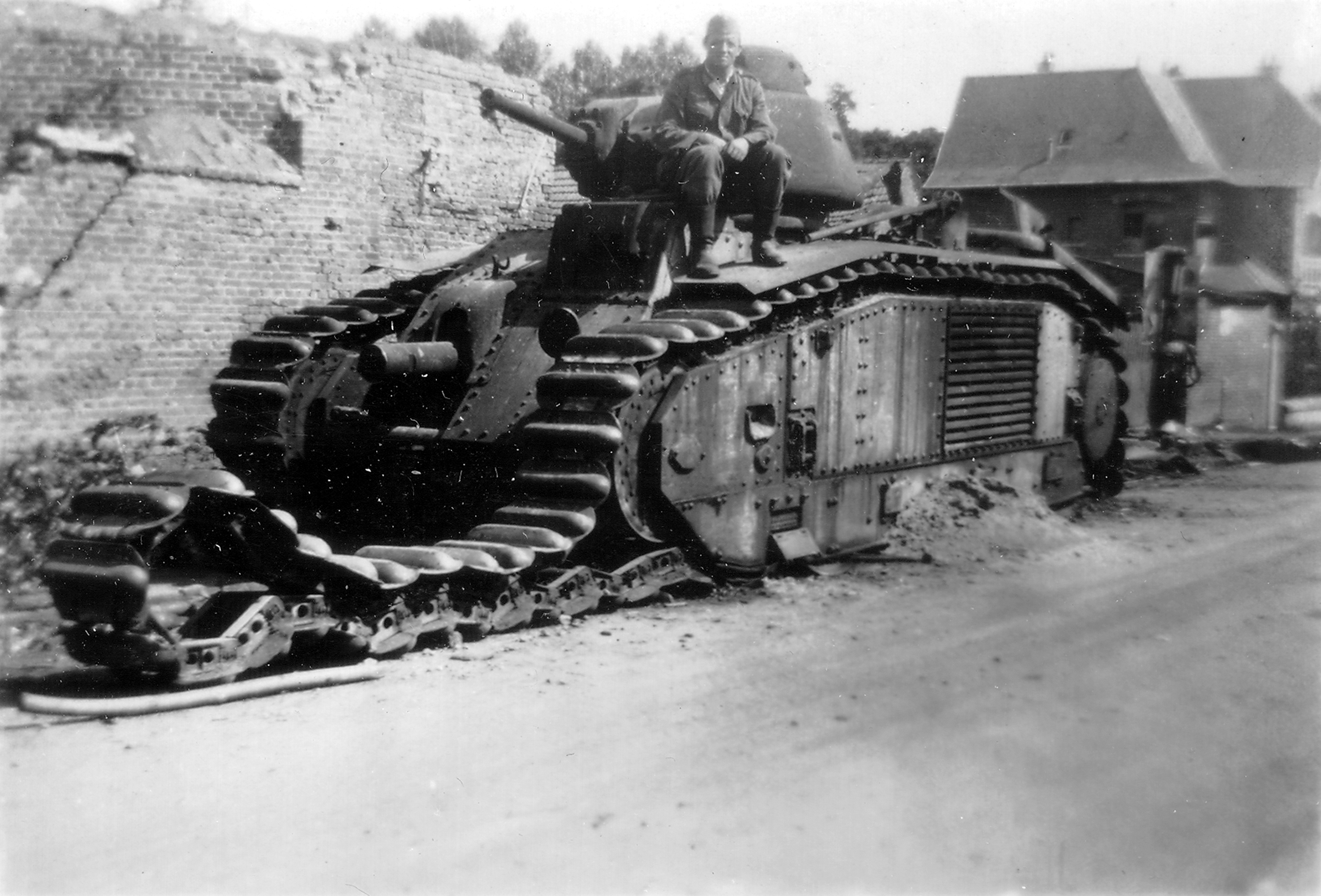
A Char B1 bis disabled in 1940 in Northern France

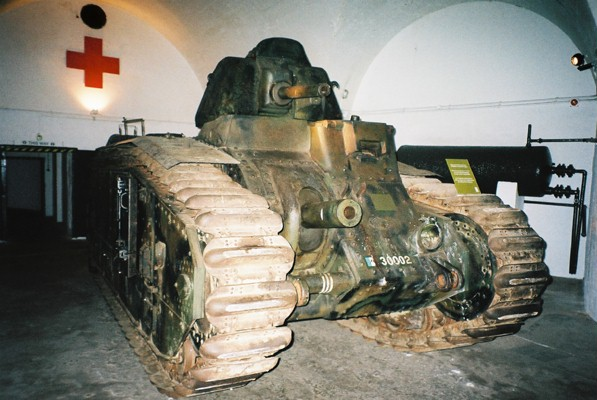
A Panzerkampfwagen B-2, showing the additional frontal armour above the hull gun. This example was Number 114 of Panzer-Abteilung 213. It is now owned by Bovington Tank Museum and shown on display at the Jersey War Tunnels.

After the German invasion, several ad hoc units were formed: the 46th Bataillon de Chars de Combat and part of the 47 BCC were added to 4e DCR with 52 Char B1s and five autonomous companies (347e, 348e, 349e, 352e and 353e Compagnie Autonome de Chars) with in total 56 tanks: 12 B1s and 44 B1 bis; 28BCC was reconstituted with 34 tanks. The regular divisions destroyed quite a few German tanks but lacked enough organic infantry and artillery to function as an effective mobile reserve.

=== German use ===
A number of Char B1s (161) were captured by the Germans during the Fall of France. These were later pressed into service as second line and training vehicles under the name of Panzerkampfwagen B-2 740 (f), and were often used as turretless Munitionspanzer supply vehicles. Sixty became platforms for flamethrowers as Flammwagen auf Panzerkampfwagen B-2 (f). Sixteen were converted into 105 mm self-propelled artillery, armed with the 10.5 cm leFH 18 light howitzer.

Ordinary tank versions also underwent some revision, as their wireless radios were replaced with the German model. A number of tanks also had an access hatch added to the turret top, and a concrete block added to the right hull front to prevent shot ricochet. Other differences to the French Army version included a jack and hoist arm carried outside the tank, with additional German equipment mounted on fenders.

One unit, Panzer-Abteilung 213, was equipped with the Char B1 bis and deployed on the Channel Islands from 1941 to 1945. One of their tanks is displayed by the Bovington Tank Museum, though repainted in French colours. In German service, the tank saw action in the Balkans campaign and the Eastern Front, initially during Operation Barbarossa, the flamethrower version from 1942 onwards. Some Char B turrets were removed and installed on German bunkers defending Normandy beaches at the time of D-Day (6 June 1944).

Panzer-Kompanie 224, a training unit, was outfitted with several flamethrower-equipped B-2s. They were stationed in Arnhem during Operation Market Garden, losing six tanks to anti-tank weaponry when they were sent to attack the Oosterbeek perimeter on 20–21 September 1944.

=== German designations ===
In German service, the tanks received the following designations.

- Panzerkampfwagen B-2 740(f): The Char B1, re-designated after capture, in use by German armed forces.
- Panzerkampfwagen B-2 740(f) als Schulfahrzeug: Turretless driver training tanks.
- Flammwagen auf Panzerkampfwagen B-2(f): Sixty flame thrower tanks converted from Char B-2(f)s. The 47mm turret gun was retained but the 75mm hull gun was replaced by the flamethrower unit in a ball fitting. Most were used in the Eastern Front and were effective at their role due to their strong frontal armor.
- 10.5 cm leFH18/3 (Sf) auf Geschützwagen B-2(f): Self-propelled artillery, armed with the 10.5 cm leFH 18 light howitzer; Sixteen converted by Rheinmetall-Borsig in 1942. It had a heavy, simple breech mechanism with a hydro-pneumatic recoil system and the 75mm howitzer in the hull was removed. With a newly installed muzzle brake, it could fire a 14.81 kg HE round to a maximum distance of 10,675 meters. Muzzle velocity was around 460 m/s, with a rate of fire between four and six rounds per minute. Production was launched in late 1941, and by the end of 1942, all planned units were delivered to the troops. They were used on the Eastern Front.

=== German units ===
The principal German units that used the Char B1 bis:

- Panzer-Brigade 100
- Panzer-Regiment 100
- Panzer-Ersatz-Abteilung 100
- Panzer-Abteilung (F) 102
- Panzer-Abteilung 213
- SS-Panzer-Abteilung "Prinz Eugen"
- Panzer-Kompanie z.b.V. 12
- Panzer-Abteilung 223
- Beutepanzer-Kompanie 223
- I./Artillerie-Regiment 93 of 26. Panzer-Division
- II./Panzer-Regiment 1 of 1. Panzer-Division
- Panzer-Regiment 2 of 16.Panzer-Division
- I./Panzer-Regiment 36 of 14.Panzer-Division
- Panzer-Abteilung 205
- Panzer-Kompanie 206
- Panzer-Kompanie C (ND) 224
- Panzerjäger-Abteilung 657 (PK 224)

=== Italian use ===
Italy independently from Germany captured eight Chars B1 bis when, in October 1940, an Italian worker disclosed to the Italian Armistice Commission that they had been hidden in a cave near Les Baux-de-Provence in July 1940. These vehicles, six of which lacked the turret, were tested, but probably not used operationally by Italy.

In contrast, the Italian armour historian Nicola Pignato stated in 1989 that some twenty B1 bis, in various stages of preparation and construction, along with a single 36-ton B1 ter prototype were directly recovered from the FCM factory, of which an unknown number were to be destined for Italy. Six vehicles in Italian service were known as Semovente B1-bis, and lacked turrets, but were used in trials until 1943, after which they were used as target practice, and ammunition carriers.

=== Free French use ===
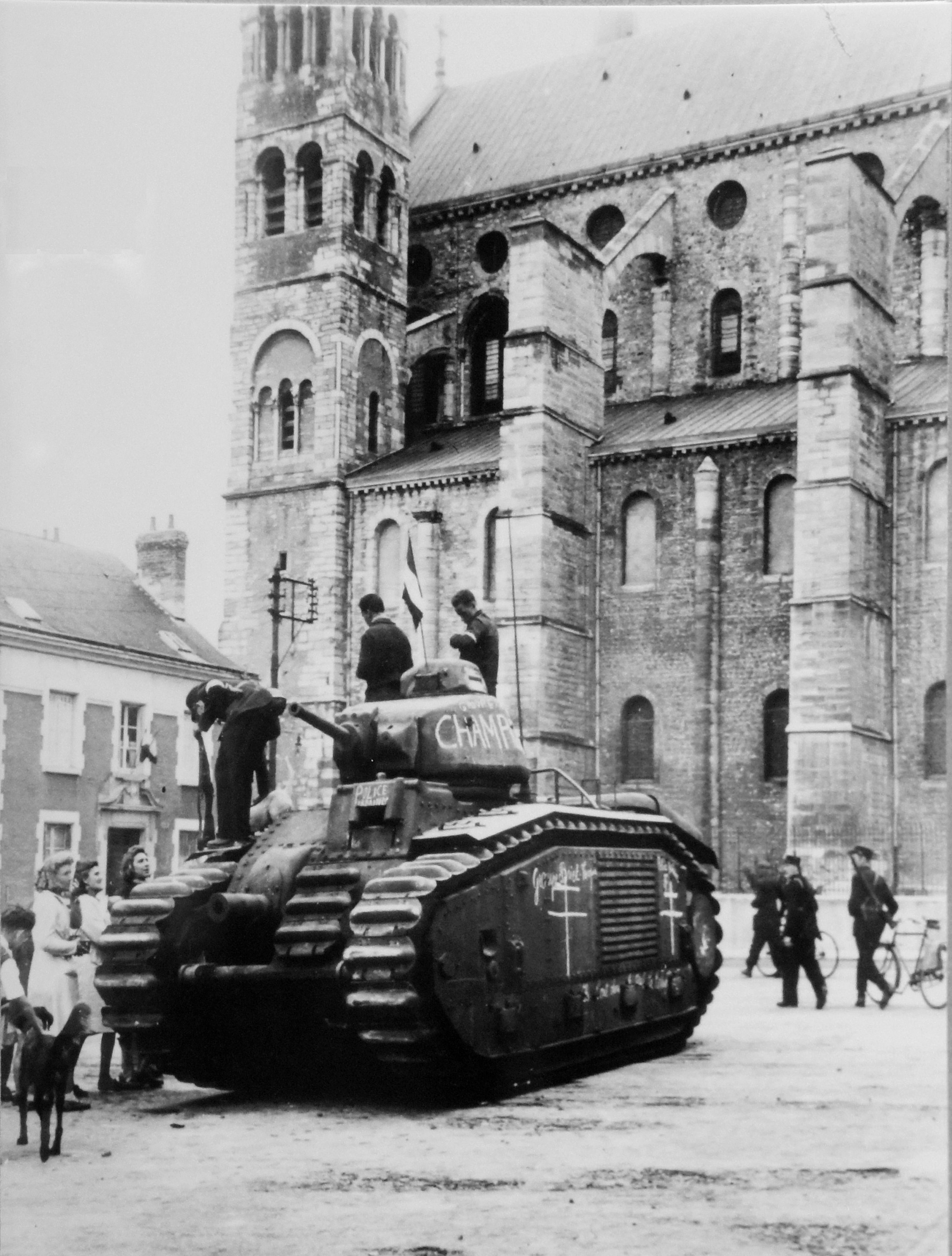
Former German B1 bis recaptured by the French Resistance in Reims, 1944.

After the Allies had invaded France in 1944, some B1s were recaptured. Several were used on an individual and incidental basis by resistance forces, such as those fighting the German garrison of Paris in August 1944. On 7 October 1944, the Provisional Government of the French Republic formed the 13th Dragoon Regiment of the Free French Forces. The majority of the regiment fielded SOMUA S35 cavalry tanks, but Captain Edmond Voillaume's 2nd Company was equipped with 19 B1 bis tanks, which included a mixture of standard and German modified B-2s. They were stationed in Orléans until 2 April 1945, when they were mobilized for the Allied siege of La Rochelle.

The tanks were effective in the attack on Royan on 15 April 1945, using their 75 mm guns for fire support, while targeting pillboxes with their 47 mm guns. After that, 2nd Company accompanied troops on an assault on Pontaillac on 17 April, followed by an attack on the German stronghold at La Rochelle between 29 April and 8 May. Voillaume was awarded the Distinguished Service Cross for his actions. After the war, the 13th Dragoon Regiment was stationed in the French occupation zone of Allied-occupied Germany as part of the French 3rd Armoured Division. It was eventually disbanded in the German town of Wittlich in April 1946.

== Surviving vehicles ==
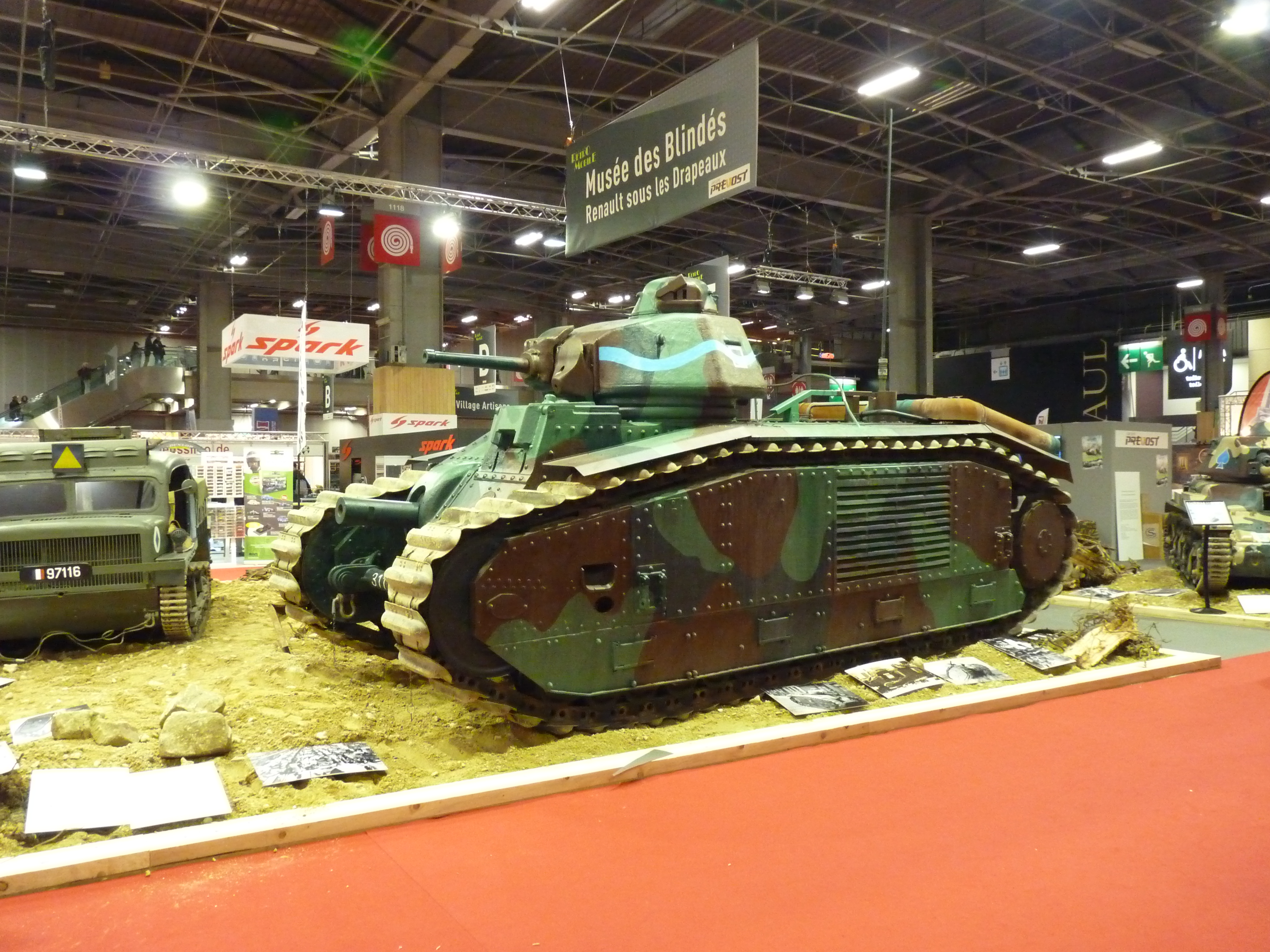
B1 bis Rhin (formerly Flandres) at Rétromobile 2018

Today eleven vehicles survive, one Char B1 and ten Char B1 bis.

The last surviving Char B1 can be seen at the Association pour la Sauvegarde du Patrimoine Historique et Militaire (ASPHM), near Strasbourg, in France. It was previously at the Fort de Seclin. It is in a bad condition, with parts like the main gun missing. It was salvaged from a firing range, and will be restored by the owner.

Ten Char B1 bis can be seen in various places in Great Britain and in France:

- A vehicle at the Bovington Tank Museum, England. It was modified for German service as the B2 variant and served as tank 114 of Panzer-Abteilung 213 in the occupied Channel Islands.
- Three are in the Musée des Blindés in Saumur, France. One, Rhin (formerly Flandres), is in running condition, while another, Rhône, is on permanent display in the museum. A third, a mine roller tank, is in storage.
- A vehicle serving as a monument in the town of Stonne, France, where during the Battle of France the B1 tanks of the 3rd Division Cuirassée played a key role in delaying the advance of the 10th Panzer Division for two days.
- Three are owned by the ASPHM, which bought one of them at the same time as the B1, from the Fort de Seclin. This B1 bis is also in a bad condition, with parts, including the main gun, missing. Salvaged from a firing range, it is intended for restoration by the owner. The two others were acquired in 2009 and are very badly damaged. They will most likely be cannibalized to restore the B1 and one of the B1 bis. One of the two B1 bis wrecks was identified as being No. 243 Intrépide, which belonged to 8th BCC and was put out of combat on 1 June 1940, at Moreuil.
- Two are on display at the 501st-503rd Tank Regiment at Mourmelon-le-Grand, France. One of these tanks was previously on display at the ERGMEB, Gien.

== See also ==
- ARL 44, French heavy tank
