= Pierre Billotte =

French Army officer and politician (1906–1992)

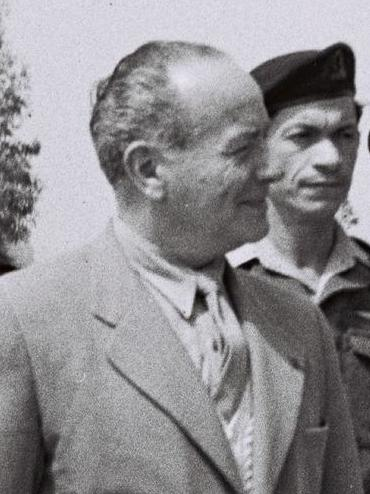
- Pierre Billotte during a visit to Israel in March 1957

Minister of the Overseas
- In office 1966–1967
- President: Charles de Gaulle
- Prime Minister: Georges Pompidou

Mayor of Créteil
- In office 1965–1977
- Succeeded by: Laurent Cathala

Personal details
- Born: 8 March 1906 Paris, France
- Died: 29 June 1992 (aged 86) Boulogne-Billancourt, France
- Party: UDR
- Parent: General Gaston Billotte (father)
- Education: École Spéciale Militaire de Saint-Cyr

Pierre Armand Gaston Billotte (8 March 1906 – 29 June 1992) was a French Army officer and politician. He was the son of General Gaston Billotte, who commanded parts of the French Army at the start of World War II. Pierre Billotte was himself notable for his combat actions during the Battle of France.

== 16 May 1940 ==
Billotte is known for his extraordinary actions as a French Tank Commander on 16 May 1940 during the battle at the French village of Stonne. Billotte served in the 1st Compagnie of the 41st Tank Battalion, equipped with the Char B1 heavy tank. Then-Captain Billotte, commanding a Char B1 Bis tank nicknamed "Eure", was instrumental in retaking the village of Stonne, defended by elements of the German 8th Panzer Regiment. The village had already been the scene of fierce fighting before Billotte's action. It lay on a strategic location on the road to Sedan and had changed hands numerous times. On 16 May, while under heavy fire from German tanks, Billotte and his B1 Bis managed to break through the German defences and to destroy two German Panzer IV tanks, eleven Panzer III tanks and two enemy guns. Billotte's Char B1-Bis tank received 140 hits from enemy tanks and guns, but none were able to penetrate the tank's heavy armour.

== Further career ==
Following the death of his father and the German victory in the Battle of France, Billotte was imprisoned by the German military. He escaped the next year, and was appointed by the Free French government-in-exile as head of the French Military Mission to Moscow. From 1942 to 1943, he served as chief of staff to Charles de Gaulle. After the Allied invasion of France, he was attached to the 2nd Armored Division. Later in 1944, he was put in command of the 10th Infantry Division, and after the liberation of France he became Assistant Chief of Staff of the French Army.

From 1946 to 1950, he headed the French Military Mission to the UN. Following his retirement from active service, he served as Minister of National Defence (1955–1956) under Edgar Faure and as Minister of Overseas Departments and Territories (1966–1968) under Georges Pompidou.

== In popular culture ==
The massively multiplayer online game, World of Tanks, includes an award, BILLOTTE'S MEDAL, named for Pierre Billotte. The massively multiplayer online game, War Thunder, has a purchasable skin of Billotte's Char B1 Bis for the game's version of the tank.

== Awards and honors ==

Legion of Honour	Ordre de la Libération	Croix de guerre 1939–1945
Médaille des Évadés	Médaille de l'Aéronautique	Insigne des blessés militaires
Médaille com. de la France libre	Order of the Dragon of Annam	Legion of Merit
Croix de guerre 1940–1945	Order of Ouissam Alaouite	Nichan Iftikhar

== Bibliography ==
- Frieser, Karl-Heinz. The Blitzkrieg Legend. Naval Institute Press, 2005. ISBN 978-1-59114-294-2
