= 2nd Armoured Division (France, 1940) =

- 2^{e} Division Cuirassée
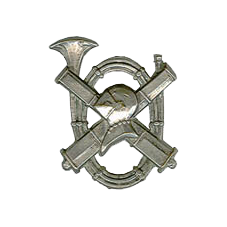
- Badge of the division.
- Active: January - July 1940
- Country: France
- Branch: French Army
- Type: Armoured Division
- Role: Armoured warfare
- Motto(s): Malgré
- Engagements: Battle of France

The 2nd Armoured Division (French: 2^{e} Division Cuirassée, 2^{e} DCR) is a unit of the French Army formed during World War II that took part in the May-June 1940 Battle of France.

== History ==
Formed 16 January 1940 at Haute Moivre. Campaigns: Battle of the Meuse, Fronts of the Aisne and the Somme, Somme Front, Battle of the Somme and Retreat of the Center. Final command post at Saint-Pierre Cherignat, northeast of Limoges. Division subsequently disbanded. Subordination: I Corps of 7th Army until 29 May and then various, including 10th Army, VII Corps, IX Corps, X Corps, 51st British Infantry Division and the Groupement Cuirassée.

== Composition ==
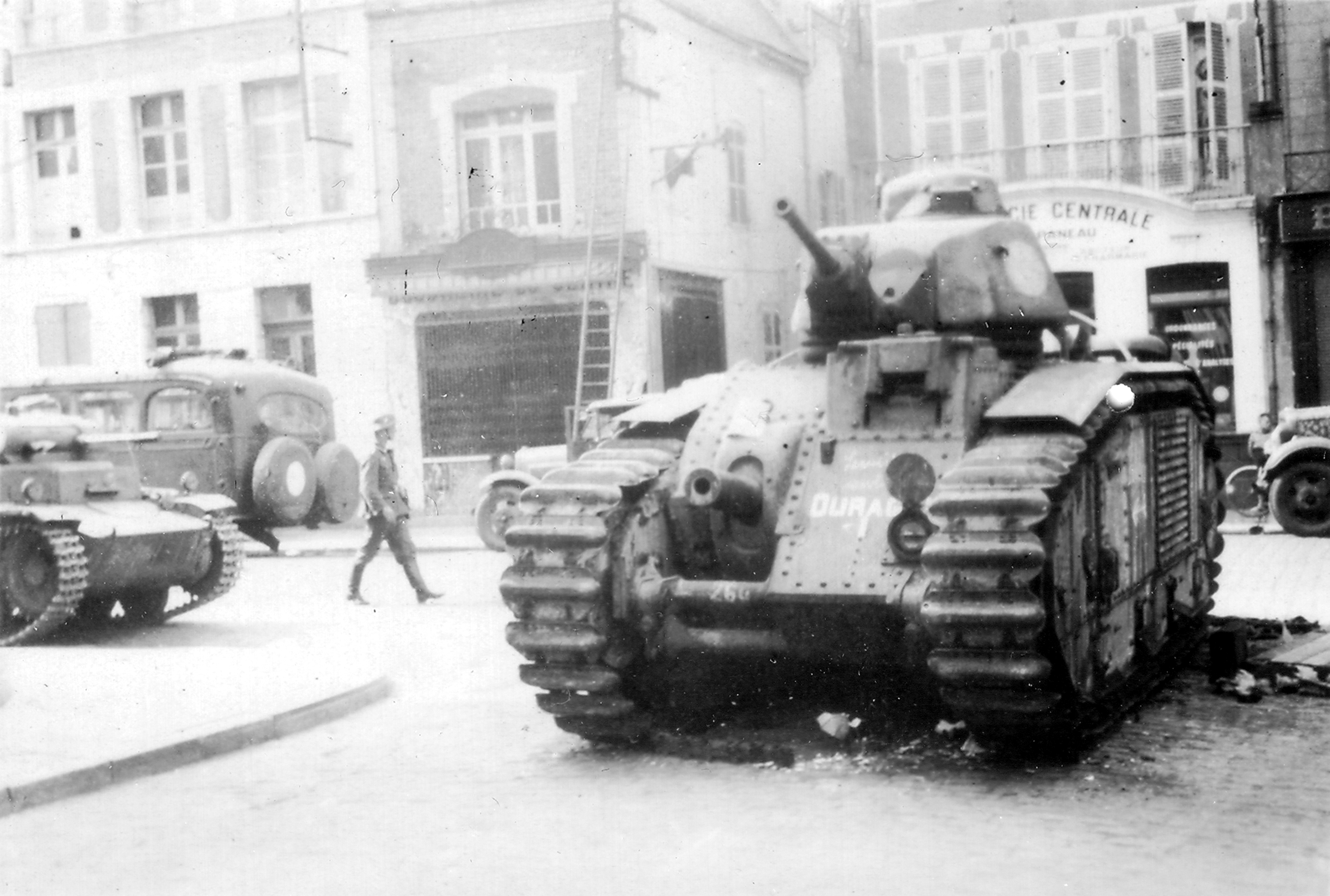
B1 bis tank of the 8th Battalion, lost in Guise, Northern France, in May 1940.

In May 1940:

- 8th Tank Battalion (B1 bis tanks)
- 15th Tank Battalion (B1 bis tanks)
- 14th Tank Battalion (H39 tanks)
- 27th Tank Battalion (H39 tanks)
- 17th Motorized Rifle Battalion (bataillon de chasseurs portés)
- 309th Artillery Regiment

== Bibliography ==
- (GUF) Service Historique de l'Armée de Terre. Guerre 1939–1945 Les Grandes Unités Françaises. Paris: Imprimerie Nationale, 1967.
