= 1st Armoured Division (France, 1940) =

- 1^{re} Division Cuirassée
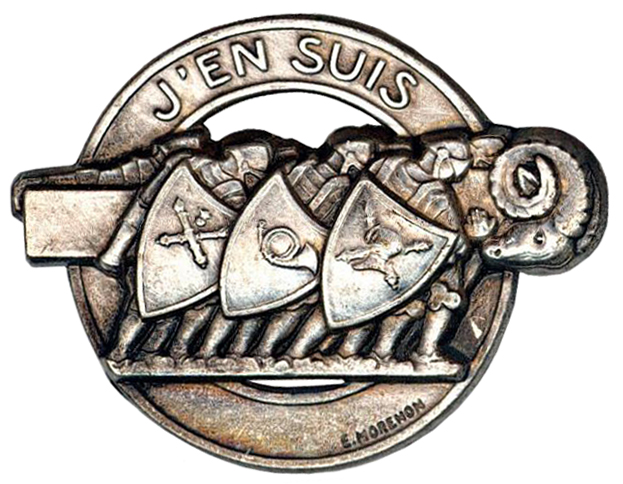
- Badge of the division.
- Active: January - August 1940
- Country: France
- Branch: French Army
- Type: Armoured Division
- Role: Armoured warfare
- Garrison/HQ: Châlons-en-Champagne
- Motto(s): J'en suis (I am in) or (I am)
- Engagements: World War II: Battle of France

The 1st Armoured Division (French: 1^{re} Division Cuirassée, 1^{re} DCR) is a unit of the French Army formed during World War II that took part in the May-June 1940 Battle of France.

== History ==
Formed 16 January 1940 at Châlons-sur-Marne. Missing half of its motorcycles and artillery caissons on 10 May 1940. Division took serious losses on 15-16 May and lost all of its tanks. It had to be reformed from 31 May until 4 June. Campaigns: Battle of the Meuse, Battle of the North, Battle of the Somme and Retreat of the Center. Division disbanded in July and August 1940. Final command post at Le Dognon, northeast of Limoges. Subordination: XI Corps of the 9th Army until 17 May, 6th Army from 1–25 June.

== Composition ==
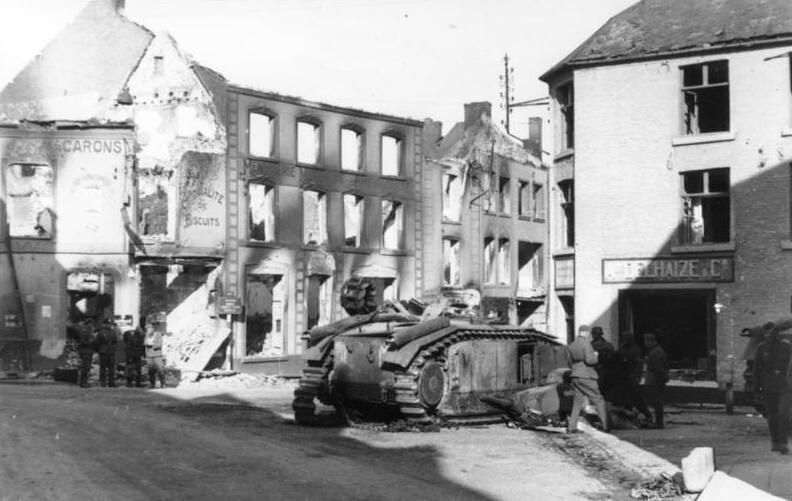
B1 bis tank of the 37th Battalion, lost in Beaumont, Belgium, in May 1940.

In May 1940:

- 28th Tank Battalion (B1 bis tanks)
- 37th Tank Battalion (B1 bis tanks)
- 25th Tank Battalion (H39 tanks)
- 26th Tank Battalion (H39 tanks)
- 5th Motorized Rifle Battalion (bataillon de chasseurs portés)
- 305th Artillery Regiment

== Bibliography ==
- (GUF) Service Historique de l'Armée de Terre. Guerre 1939–1945 Les Grandes Unités Françaises. Paris: Imprimerie Nationale, 1967.
