= 3rd Armoured Division (France, 1940) =

- 3^{e} Division Cuirassée
- Active: March - May 1940
- Country: France
- Branch: French Army
- Type: Armoured Division
- Role: Armoured warfare
- Size: 200
- Motto: Boutez En Avant (Push Forward)
- Engagements: World War II: Battle of France

The 3rd Armoured Division (French: 3^{e} Division Cuirassée, 3^{e} DCR) is a unit of the French Army formed during World War II that took part in the May–June 1940 Battle of France.

== History ==
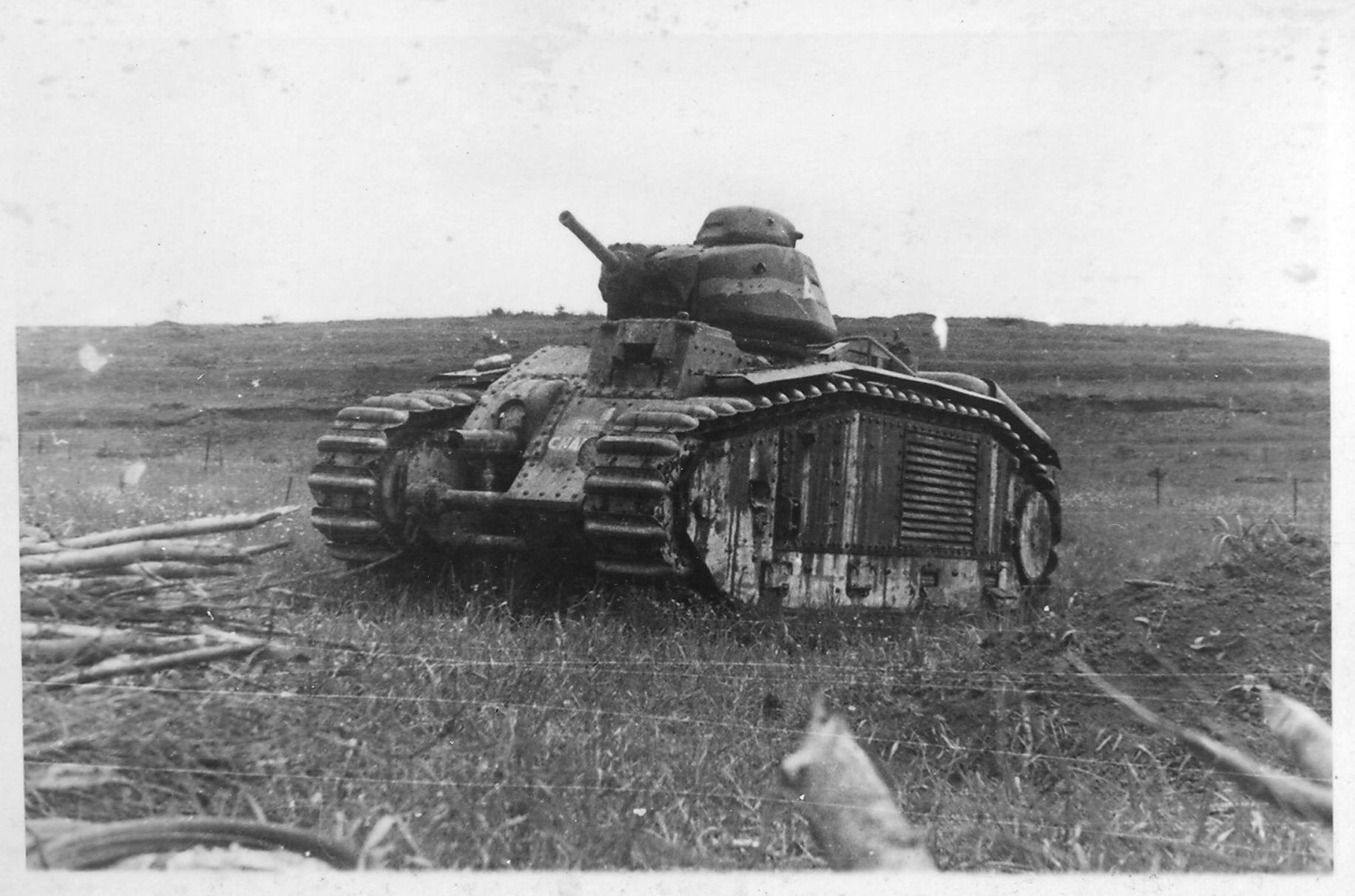
B1 bis tank of the 41st Tank Battalion, lost near Ouvrage La Ferté in May 1940

Formed 20 March 1940 at Reims. Campaigns: Battle of the Meuse, Meuse Front, Battle of the Aisne and Retreat of the center. Final command post at Montbard northwest of Dijon. Division captured 17–18 June. Subordination: XXI Corps of 2nd Army until 23 May, then various including 4th Army and XVIII Corps of 2nd Army.

== Composition ==
In May 1940:

- 41st Tank Battalion (B1 bis tanks)
- 49th Tank Battalion (B1 bis tanks)
- 42nd Tank Battalion (H39 tanks)
- 45th Tank Battalion (H39 tanks)
- 16th Motorized Rifle Battalion (bataillon de chasseurs portés)
- 319th Artillery Regiment

== Bibliography ==
- (GUF) Service Historique de l'Armée de Terre. Guerre 1939–1945 Les Grandes Unités Françaises. Paris: Imprimerie Nationale, 1967.
