= Grandes Unités Françaises =

Grandes Unités Françaises (full title: Guerre 1939-1945 Les Grandes Unités Françaises) is a monumental six-volume (the fifth volume is actually composed of four separate works) World War II order of battle and military unit history reference compiled by the historical service of the chief of staff of the French Army. The volumes were published in Paris by the Imprimerie Nationale.

The volumes progress chronologically through the war, are divided by sections devoted to each corps or division of the French Army, and detail, day-by-day, the subordination of the units, their sub-units, location of the command posts, and the actions of the units.

The volumes are written in French, but the tabular organization of much of the information allows the volumes to be used by any researcher familiar with French Army terminology of World War II. The entire series runs to thousands of pages; Part 2 of Volume 5 alone has 1,422 pages.

The volumes, their content, and their publication date are:

Volume 1. 1940: Corps, Fortified Regions, and Groups. 1967.
Volume 2. 1940: Infantry Divisions, Light Chasseur Divisions, and North African Divisions. 1967.
Volume 3. 1940: Colonial Divisions, African Divisions, Light Infantry Divisions, Polish Divisions, Light Cavalry Divisions, Armored Divisions, Spahi Brigades, Defensive and Fortified Sectors, and Fortress Divisions. 1967.
Volume 4. November 1942 – July 1944: French forces in North Africa, French Expeditionary Corps in Italy, subordinate divisions of these corps, and the operations on Corsica and Elba. 1970.
Volume 5, Part 1. August 1944 – May 1945: 3rd Algerian, 4th Moroccan, 9th Colonial, and 27th Alpine Divisions. 1972.
Volume 5, Part 2. August 1944 – May 1945: 1 March, 2nd Moroccan, 10th Infantry, 14th Infantry, 1st Armored, 2nd Armored, and 5th Armored Divisions. 1975.
Volume 5, Part 3. August 1944 – May 1945: I and II Corps. 1976.
Volume 5, Part 4. Maps to accompany Volume 5, Parts 1 through 3. 1976.
Volume 6. August 1944 – May 1945: The Atlantic and Alpine Fronts. 1980.

Among order of battle researchers and enthusiasts, the volumes are often referred to as the GUF, or sometimes, the LGUF.
