= List of military vehicles of World War II =

The following is a list of Second World War military vehicles used by each participant country, showing numbers produced in parentheses.

== Albania ==
=== Tanks ===
- Fiat 3000

=== Armoured cars ===
- Lancia 1ZM

=== Tankettes ===
- CV-33

== Australia ==
=== Tanks ===
- Sentinel (65)
- Thunderbolt (1)
- AC4 (1)

=== Armoured cars ===
- Dingo (245)
- Rhino (3)
- Rover (238)

== Belgium ==
=== Tanks ===
- ACG-1 (12)
- T-13 (199)
- T-15 (42)
- Renault FT (75 in storage)

=== Utility vehicles ===
- FN Tricar (331 ordered and partially delivered)

== Bulgaria ==
=== Tankettes ===
- L3/33 (14)

=== Tanks ===
- Vickers Mk E (8)
- Renault R35 (39)
- SOMUA S35 (6)
- Hotchkiss H35 (19)
- Panzer 35(t) (36)
- Panzer 38(t) (10)
- Panzer I (1)
- Panzer IV (46 or 91)
- T-34 (85)
- PzKpfw IV H with 76.2mm ZiS-3 gun Bulgarian modified Panzer IV

=== Self-propelled guns ===
==== Tank-based ====
- Semovente da 47/32 (2)
- Jagdpanzer IV
- Sturmgeschütz III (55 ordered, 25 delivered)
- Sturmgeschütz IV

=== Armored cars ===
- Leichter Panzerspähwagen (20)
- Sd.Kfz.232 Schwerer Panzerspähwagen

=== Utility vehicles ===
- Fiat 626 (100)
- Ursus A
- Pavesi P4
- TL.37
- Stoewer R200 Spezial 40 (10)

== Canada ==
=== Tanks ===
- M3 Stuart (432) light tank used by America and Canada
- Ram (2,993) regular tank not used in combat, specialist models used
- Grizzly I (188) A modified version of the M4A1 Sherman tank license produced in Canada
- Valentine (1,420) Valentine tanks produced in Canada. Most sent to the Soviet Union as Lend-Lease aid. Some were retained in Canada for training.
- Badger – a flame tank version of the Ram
- M4 Sherman

=== Self-propelled artillery ===
- Sexton (2,150)

=== Armoured personnel carriers ===
- C15TA (3,960)
- Kangaroo (converted from various AFV designs)

=== Armoured cars ===
- Lynx (3,255)
- Otter (1,761)
- Fox (1,506)

=== Utility vehicles ===
- Ford F15 (400,000)

== China ==
=== Tankettes ===
- Carden Loyd tankette Mk VI (53)
- L3/33 (bought from Italy before the war)
- L3/35 (bought from Italy before the war)

=== Tanks ===
- Renault FT (most of delivered 36 tanks, 3 tanks captured by Japanese in 1931)
- M4 Sherman (35 tanks, only used in India-Burma Theater by Chinese Expedition Army)
- M3 Stuart (M3A3, M5A1) (50 tanks, only used in India-Burma Theater by Chinese Expedition Army)
- M24 Chaffee – 233
- M18 Hellcat
- Type 95 Ha-Go (captured only)
- Type 97 Chi-Ha (captured only)
- Panzer I (10 bought from Germany before the war)
- Vickers 6-ton (20 bought from UK before the war)
- Vickers amphibious tank M1931 (29 tanks purchased from GB)
- British 12-ton tank (type unclear – likely Vickers Medium Mark II, possibly Cruiser Mk I, or remotely Matilda I)
- T26 (88 provided by Soviets in 1938)
- BT-5 (4 provided by Soviets in 1938)
- Marmon-Herrington CTLS (few diverted from Dutch after the fall of Java)
- AMR 35
- T-34 (supplied from Russia)

=== Armored cars ===
- Dowa licence produced Model 25 Vickers Crossley armored car
- GMC M1931 (Chinese copy)
- Leichter Panzerspähwagen (Sd.Kfz. 221 and Sd.Kfz. 222) – 12 bought from Germany
- BA-10 and BA-20 – about 50
- Renault UE Chenillette about 10
- M8 light armor car

== Croatia ==
=== Tankettes ===
- TKS/TK3 (16)
- L3/33 (6)
- L3/35 (4)
- 35M Ansaldo (10~15)
- Panzer I Ausf.A (4)

=== Armoured cars ===
- AB-41
- Oklopni samovoz
- Several Improvised armoured cars

=== Tanks ===
- Renault FT
- Renault R-35
- L6/40 (~26)
- H35/39
- Somua S35 ?

=== Tank destroyers ===
- Semoventi L40 da 47/32

== Czechoslovakia ==
=== Tanks ===
- LT vz. 35 (434)
- LT vz. 38 (1,167)

=== Tankettes ===
- Tančík vz. 33 (70)
- AH-IV (206)

=== Armoured cars ===
- OA vz. 27 (15)
- OA vz. 30 (51)

== Denmark ==
- Armoured Harley Davidson motorcycle (trials)
- Fiat 3000 (1)
- FP-4 and FP-5
- Landsverk L-180 (2)
- Landsverk L-185 (1, used for training)
- Pansarbil m/39 (3)
- PV-10 (5)
- V3 "Holger Danske" armored car (Made on a Ford FAA)

== Estonia ==
=== Tanks ===
- Mark V Composite (4)
- Renault FT (12)

=== Tankettes ===
- TKS (6)

=== Armoured cars ===
- Landsverk L-180 (1)
- Arsenal Crossley M27/28 (13)

== Finland ==
=== Tanks ===
- Renault FT (used only as in place fire position)
- Vickers Mark E (26) (Modified, equipped with 37 mm Puteaux SA-18 or with 37mm Bofors)
- BT-5 and BT-7 (captured)
- T-26 (captured)
- T-28 (captured)
- T-34 (captured)
- KV-1 (captured)
- Panzer IV (bought)

==== Anti-aircraft ====
- Landsverk L-62 Anti II (6)

=== Assault guns ===
- BT-42 (18)
- Sturmgeschütz III (59)

== France ==
=== Tanks ===
==== Artillery Tractors ====
- Laffly V15
- P107 (3, 276)
- SOMUA MCG

==== Armoured reconnaissance tanks ====
- AMR 33 (123)
- AMR 35 (200)

==== Armoured combat tanks ====
- AMC 34 (12)
- AMC 35 (57)

==== Light tanks ====
- Renault R35 (1,601)
- Hotchkiss H35 (1,100) - Hotchkiss H35 or modified version H39.
- FCM 36 (100)
- Char D1 (160)
- Renault R40 (130)
- Renault FT (1,580) - World War I era tank.
- AMX 38 - trials.

==== Medium tanks ====
- Somua S-35 (430)
- Char D2 (100)

==== Heavy tanks ====
- Char B1 (405)
- FCM 2C (10)
- FCM F1 (1 wooden mock-up)

=== Tank destroyers ===
- Laffly W15 TCC (70)
- AMR 35 Renault ZT2 (10)
- AMR 35 Renault ZT3 (10)
- Somua S40 (trials)

=== Self-propelled guns ===
- Canon de 194 mle GPF (50)
- Renault FT BS (39)
- 105 leFH18B2 (16)

=== Armoured personnel carriers ===
- Renault UE (5,168)
- Laffly S15R
- Laffly S20 (630)
- Lorraine 37L (630)
- VDP Lorraine 28 (404)

=== Armoured cars ===
- Panhard 178 (941)
- AMC Schneider P 16 (100)

== Germany ==
=== Tanks ===
==== Light tanks ====
- Panzer I (1,659, excluding conversions)
- Panzer II (1,856, excluding conversions)
- Panzer 35(t) (Czechoslovak design, 434)
- Panzer 38(t) (Czechoslovak design, 1,168 total)
- Kampfpanzer 7TP(p) (7TP captured during Germany's invasion of Poland)
- Pz.Kpfw. 17/18 R(f) (Renault FT captured following the Battle of France)
- Pz.Kpfw. 35R(f) (Renault R35 captured following the Battle of France) (~800)
- Pz.Kpfw. 35/38/39 H(f) (Hotchkiss H35 captured following the Battle of France)
- Pz.Kpfw. T-26(r) (captured T-26)

==== Medium tanks ====
- Panzer III (5,774, excluding StuG III)
- Panzer IV (8,553)
- Panzer V "Panther" (5,984)
- Panther II tank (prototype)

==== Heavy tanks ====
- VK 4501 (P) (91, one used as command tank, most of the others converted to Elefant tank destroyers)
- Tiger I (1,347)
- Tiger II a.k.a. "King Tiger" or "Royal Tiger" (489)

==== Super-heavy tanks ====
- Maus (2 prototypes completed)

=== Armoured cars ===
- Panzerjäger Bren 731(e) (Universal Carrier captured by the Germans and fitted with a triple Panzerschreck mount)
- Fahrgestell Bren (Universal Carrier reused by the Germans with a 3.7 cm PaK 36 gun)
- Sd.Kfz. 221 Leichter Panzerspähwagen light armoured car
- Sd.Kfz. 222 Leichter Panzerspähwagen light armoured car
- Sd.Kfz. 223 Leichter Panzerspähwagen Light armoured car
- Sd.Kfz. 231 Schwere Panzerspähwagen (6-Rad) heavy armoured car
- Sd.Kfz. 232 Schwere Panzerspähwagen (8-Rad) heavy armoured car
- Sd.Kfz. 233 Schwere Panzerspähwagen (8-Rad) heavy armoured car
- Sd.Kfz. 234/1 Schwere Panzerspähwagen (8-Rad) heavy armoured car
- Sd.Kfz. 234/2 Schwere Panzerspähwagen (8-Rad) Puma heavy armoured car
- Sd.Kfz. 234/3 Schwere Panzerspähwagen (8-Rad) Stummel heavy armoured car
- Sd.Kfz. 234/4 Schwere Panzerspähwagen (8-Rad) heavy armoured car
- Sd.Kfz. 234 8-wheeled armored car (also known as Puma or Stummel)
- Steyr ADGZ heavy armoured car (from Austrian annex)
- Panzerspähwagen P204(f) (Panhard 178 captured following the Battle of France)
- Panzerspähwagen BA-10(r) (captured BA-10)
- Panzerspähwagen AB43 203(i) (captured after Italian armistice)

=== Utility vehicles ===
- Mercedes-Benz L3000 truck (27,700) was the most bought in 1944
- Opel Blitz truck
- Raupenschlepper Ost tracked truck
- Steyr 1500A light truck
- Horch 108 heavy off-road passenger car, Einheits-PKW der Wehrmacht
- Volkswagen Kübelwagen 4-piston multipurpose all-terrain support vehicle (50,435)
- Volkswagen Schwimmwagen amphibious variant of the Kübelwagen (14,265)
- Volkswagen Type 82E 4-piston squad car/personal command car

==== Motorcycles ====
- BMW R75 (two-wheel-drive motorcycle with side car)
- Nimbus (made in Denmark)
- Zündapp KS750 (two-wheel-drive motorcycle with side car) (18,000)

=== Half-tracks ===
- Maultier (22,500)
- Schwerer Wehrmachtschlepper (825)
- Sd.Kfz. 2 "Kettenkrad" (8,345)
- Sd.Kfz. 3 (21,020)
- Sd.Kfz. 4 (1,480)
- Sd.Kfz. 6 (3,660)
- Sd.Kfz. 7 (12,187)
- Sd.Kfz. 10 (14,000)
- Sd.Kfz. 11 (app. 9000)
- Sd.Kfz. 250 (6,628)
- Sd.Kfz. 251 "Hanomag" (15,252)
- Sd.Kfz 252 (413)
- Sd.Kfz 253 (285)
- Sd.Kfz 254 (140)

=== Self-propelled artillery ===
- 8 cm Raketen-Vielfachwerfer
- Sd.Kfz. 165 Hummel (100+)
- Sd.Kfz. 138/1 Grille I/II (389)
- Sd.Kfz. 124 Wespe (676)
- Sd.Kfz. 4/1 15 cm Panzerwerfer 42 auf Selbstfahrlafette "Maultier" (300)
- Karl-Gerät 60 cm 24 a/k/a "Mörser Karl" (7)
- Schwerer Gustav (2 built)

=== Assault guns ===
- Sd.Kfz. 142 Sturmgeschütz III (StuG III) (10,086)
- Sturmhaubitze 42 (1,299)
- Sturm-Infanteriegeschütz 33B (24)
- Sd.Kfz. 166 Brummbär (306)
- Sd.Kfz. 167 Sturmgeschütz IV (StuG IV) (1,108+31 conversions)
- Sturmtiger (18)
- 10.5 cm K gepanzerte Selbstfahrlafette "Dicker Max" (2 prototypes)
- 12.8 cm Selbstfahrlafette auf VK 30.01(H) "Sturer Emil" (2 prototypes)
- 15 cm sIG 33 (Sf) auf Panzerkampfwagen I Ausf B (38)
- 15 cm sIG 33 auf Fahrgestell Panzerkampfwagen II (Sf) (12)

=== Tank destroyers ===
- Panzerjäger I (202)
- Sd.Kfz. 132 Marder I (170)
- Sd.Kfz. 131 Marder II (576)
- Sd.Kfz. 138 Marder III (1,561, all types)
- Sd.Kfz. 138/2 Jagdpanzer 38(t) "Hetzer" (2,827)
- Sd.Kfz. 162 Jagdpanzer IV (1,977)
- Sd.Kfz. 164 Nashorn (494)
- Sd.Kfz. 173 Jagdpanzer V "Jagdpanther" (415)
- Sd.Kfz. 184 Panzerjäger Tiger (P) Elefant (91)
- Sd.Kfz. 186 Jagdpanzer VI "Jagdtiger" (88)

=== Self-propelled anti-aircraft guns ===
- Sd.Kfz. 7/1 2 cm FlaKvierling 38 L/112.5 (319) – quadruple 2 cm gun on a half track chassis
- Sd.Kfz. 7/2 3.7 cm FlaK 37 L/98 (123) – 3.7 cm gun on half track chassis
- Sd.Kfz. 10/4 and Sd.Kfz. 10/5 (~2,000) – 2 cm gun on a half track chassis
- Flakpanzer 38(t) (141)
- Flakpanzer IV "Möbelwagen" (~300) – Sd.Kfz. 161/3, a 3.7 cm gun on Panzer IV chassis
- Flakpanzer IV "Wirbelwind" (87-105) – Sd.Kfz. 161/4, quadruple 2 cm Flak on Panzer IV chassis
- Flakpanzer I (24) – 2 cm Flak 38 on a Panzer I chassis
- Flakpanzer IV "Ostwind" (43–45) – turreted 3.7 cm gun on Panzer IV chassis
- Flakpanzer IV "Kugelblitz" (5 prototypes)
- 3.7 cm Flakzwilling auf Panther Fahrgestell (only a wooden mock-up was built)

=== Remote controlled vehicles ===
- Borgward B IV demolition vehicle (1,181)
- Goliath tracked mine (7,564)
- Springer demolition vehicle (50)

== Hungary ==
=== Tanks ===
==== Light tanks ====
- Toldi I, II, IIa, and III (202)
- Straussler V-4 (4+ prototypes)
- T-38 (Panzer 38(t), Czechoslovak design, 105-111)
- 35M and 37M Tankettes (modified L3/33 and L3/35, 60-150)

==== Medium tanks ====
- Turán I and II (424)
- 43M Turán III (2 prototypes)
- Panzer III
- Panzer IV (74+)
- Panzer V "Panther" (5-17)

==== Heavy tanks ====
- 44M Tas (2 prototypes)
- Tiger I (13-15)

==== Captured tanks ====
- BT-7 (captured)
- Hotchkiss H39 (15 captured vehicles provided by Germany)
- LT vz. 34 (captured)
- LT vz. 35 (captured)
- M3 Stuart (captured)
- SOMUA S35 (2 captured vehicles provided by Germany)
- T-26 (captured)
- T-28 (captured)
- T-34 (including T-34/76 and T-34/85) (captured)

=== Self-propelled guns ===
- 43M Zrínyi II (72)
- Sturmgeschütz III G (StuG III G) (50)

=== Tank destroyers ===
- 44M Zrínyi I (1 prototype)
- 43M Toldi páncélvadász (1 prototype)
- Marder II (5-7)
- Jagdpanzer 38(t) "Hetzer" (75-101)

=== Self-propelled anti-aircraft guns ===
- 40M Nimród (135)

=== Armoured cars ===
- 39M Csaba (102-145)

=== Utility vehicles ===
- 38M Botond (2,554)
- 37M (Sd.Kfz. 11, 74)
- 43M Lehel (Hu) (APC/medical vehicle based on the Nimród chassis, 1-4 prototypes)

== India ==
=== Armoured cars ===
- Armoured Carrier Wheeled Indian Pattern (4,655)

== Iran ==
=== Half-tracks ===
- Citroën-Kégresse P1T ?

=== Armoured cars ===
- Rolls-Royce India Pattern AC (4)
- Marmon-Herrington M1934
- Marmon Herrington CTL-1 (12)
- Marmon Herrington AC + Landsverk turret & 37mm Bofors (12)
- LaFrance Tk-6

=== Tankettes ===
- AH-IV(P) (50)
- Tančik vz 33 (1 prototype)

=== Tanks ===
==== Light tanks ====
- ČKD TNHP (50)
- Renault FT

== Iraq ==
=== Tankettes ===
- L3/35 (≈16)

=== Armoured cars ===
- Iraqi Crossley MkI (≈14)

== Italy ==
=== Tankettes ===
- Carro Veloce L3/33 (CV-33) (760)
- Carro Veloce L3/35 (CV-35) (1,740)

=== Tanks ===
==== Light tanks ====
- Fiat 3000 (152~200)
- Carro Armato L6/40 (283)

==== Medium tanks ====
- Carro Armato M11/39 (100)
- Carro Armato M13/40 (740)
- Carro Armato M14/41 (800~939)
- Carro Armato M15/42 (82~282)
- Carro Armato Celere Sahariano M16/43 (only prototype)

==== Heavy tanks ====
- Carro Pesante P26/40 (101~103)
- P43 (Prototype)

=== Tank destroyers and self-propelled guns ===
- 102/35 su Fiat 634N truck (7)
- Semovente M40 47/32 (282~300)
- Semovente M41 75/18 (262~467)
- Semovente da 75/34 (141~182)
- Semovente M43 75/46 (11~13)
- Semovente M41 90/53 (30~48)
- Semovente M42L 105/25 (121)
- Semovente da 149/40 (only prototype)
- Semovente da 20/70 quadruplo (only prototype)

=== Armoured cars ===
- Autoblindo 40 (24)
- Autoblindo 41 (647)
- Autoblindo Lince (250)
- Autoblindo 43 (70) (All were captured and used by the German Army)

=== Trucks & Personnel Carriers ===
- Fiat 626 (10,000)
- Fiat 634
- Fiat 665NM protetto (110)
- Fiat 666
- Lancia 3Ro (1701 petrol, 3056 diesel)
- SPA AS.37 (802)
- SPA Dovunque 35
- SPA Dovunque 35 protetto (limited number)

=== Utility vehicles ===
- SPA-Viberti AS.42
- Alfa Romeo 430 truck
- Alfa Romeo 500 truck
- Alfa Romeo 800 heavy truck
- Breda 61 half-track (250, licensed copy of Sd.Kfz. 7)
- TL.37 artillery tractor

== Japan ==
=== Tankettes ===
- Type 92 cavalry tank (167)
- Type 94 tankette (823)
- Type 97 Te-Ke (616)

=== Tanks ===
==== Light tanks ====
- Type 95 Ha-Go (2,300)
- Type 98 Ke-Ni (104)
- Type 2 Ke-To (34)
- Type 4 Ke-Nu (100)
- Type 5 Ke-Ho (1 prototype)

==== Medium tanks ====
- Type 89 Chi-Ro (404)
- Type 97 Chi-Ha (1,162)
- Type 98 Chi-Ho (4 prototypes)
- Type 97-Kai Shinhoto Chi-Ha (930)
- Type 1 Chi-He (170)
- Type 3 Chi-Nu (144 to 166)
- Type 4 Chi-To (2)
- Type 5 Chi-Ri (1 incomplete prototype)

==== Heavy tanks ====
- Type 91 heavy tank (1 prototype)
- Type 95 heavy tank (4 prototypes)

=== Amphibious tanks ===
- Type 2 Ka-Mi (182 to 184)
- Type 3 Ka-Chi (19)
- Type 5 To-Ku (1 prototype)

=== Self-propelled guns ===
- Type 1 75 mm SPH Ho-Ni I (26)
- Type 1 105 mm SPH Ho-Ni II (54)
- Type 2 gun tank Ho-I (31)
- Type 3 gun tank Ho-Ni III (31)
- Type 4 150 mm SPH Ho-Ro (12)
- Type 4 120 mm SPH Ho-To (1 prototype)
- Type 5 47 mm SPG Ho-Ru (1 prototype)
- Short barrel 120 mm gun tank (12)
- Naval 12 cm SPG (1 prototype)

=== Armoured personnel carriers ===
- Type 1 Ho-Ha (unknown)
- Type TC (1 prototype)
- Type TE (1 prototype)
- Type TG (1 prototype)
- Type 1 Ho-Ki (limited)
- Type 4 Chi-So (limited)
- Type 4 Ka-Tsu armoured tracked amphibious carrier (49)

=== Armoured cars ===
- Vickers Crossley armoured car (12)
- Chiyoda armored car (200)
- Sumida M.2593 (1,000)
- Type 93 armoured car (5)

== Latvia ==
=== Armoured cars ===
- various dating from WW1

=== Tankettes ===
- Carden Loyd MK IV (1)

=== Tanks ===
- Vickers Carden-Loyd M1937 (6)
- Vickers Carden-Loyd M1936 (12)
- Mark V Composite (5)
- Mark Medium B (2)
- Fiat 3000 (6)

== Lithuania ==
=== Armoured cars ===
- Landsverk L-181 (6)
- various from WW1

=== Tanks ===
- Vickers Carden Loyd M1934 (16)
- Renault FT (12)

== Manchukuo ==
=== Armoured Cars ===
- Type 92 AC (30)
- Vickers Crossley AC

=== Tankettes ===
- Type 94 Tankette
- Carden-Loyd Tankette Mk VI (20)

=== Tanks ===
- Renault FT

== Mexico ==
=== Tanks ===
- Light tank M3 - M3A1 Stuart III (25 units delivered in 1942)

== Netherlands ==
=== Tankettes ===
- Carden-Loyd Mark VI (5)

=== Light tanks ===
- Renault FT (1)
- Vickers light tank "Dutchman" (22) used by the KNIL
- Vickers Light Amphibious Tank (2) used by the KNIL
- Marmon-Herrington CTLS4-TA (7) used by the KNIL (26 Suriname) (7 Curaçao) (6 Aruba)
- Marmon-Herrington MTLS-1G14 (14 Suriname)
- Marmon-Herrington CTMS-ITB1 (28 Suriname)(2 Curaçao)(1 Aruba)

=== Armoured cars ===
- Landsverk L180 (14)
- Landsverk L181 (12)
- M39 Pantserwagen (12)
- Wilton Fijenoord (3)
- Morris Wijnman (3)
- Marmon-Herrington Mk III (49) used by the KNIL
- Alvis-Straussler AC3D (12) used by the KNIL
- M3A1 White Scout Car (40) used by the KNIL

=== Armoured personnel carrier ===
- Overvalwagen (~30) used by the KNIL

=== Self-propelled anti-air-gun ===
- Ehrhardt Potkachel (1)

== New Zealand ==
=== Converted tractors ===
- Bob Semple tank (4)

=== Light tanks ===
- Light tank, wheel-and-track (Schofield) wheel/caterpillar fast tank, prototype only

Also American M3 Stuart tanks, called "Honeys" by the Brits and Commonwealth, used in Italy as recon vehicles

=== Armoured personnel carriers ===
- Universal carrier (1,300)

=== Armoured cars ===
- Beaverette NZ (208) light armoured car similar to the British Beaverette

== Norway ==
=== Light tanks ===
- Stridsvagn L-120 (1)

== Poland ==
=== Tankettes ===
- TK-3 (280)
- TKS (260)
- TKS with 20 mm gun (24)

=== Tanks ===
- 4TP
- 7TP (162)
- 9TP (2 prototypes + 11 possible production models)
- 10TP (1 prototype)
- 14TP

=== Armored cars ===
- Samochód pancerny wz. 28
- Samochód pancerny wz. 29 (10-13)
- Samochód pancerny wz. 34 (87)
- Kubuś (1, used by the Polish Home Army)

=== Self-propelled guns ===
- TKS-D (2)
- TKD (4)

=== Artillery tractors ===
- C2P (200)
- C4P
- C7P (151)
- PZInż 302

=== Utility vehicles ===
- Fiat 508 łazik
- Fiat 508/518
- Fiat 518
- Fiat 618
- Fiat 621
- Ursus A

== Reorganized National Government of ROC ==
=== Tankettes ===
- Type 94 Tankette (18)

== Romania ==
=== Tankettes ===
- R-1 (Modified Czechoslovak AH-IV, 1 prototype + 35 imported from Czechoslovakia)

=== Tanks ===
- R-2 (Panzer 35(t), Czechoslovak design, 126 + 26 Panzer 35(t))

=== Tank destroyers ===
- Mareşal (7 prototypes + early serial production)
- TACAM T-60 (Soviet T-60 converted into a tank destroyer with a different Soviet gun, 34)
- TACAM R-2 (Czechoslovak Panzer 35(t) converted into a tank destroyer with a Soviet gun, 21)
- Vânătorul de care R35 (R35 with different gun, French design, 30)

=== Armoured cars ===
- AB md. 41 (1 prototype)
- Sd. Kfz. 222 (46)
- Sd. Kfz. 223 (35)
- AB-41 (8)
- Peugeot Armored Car (2)
- Austin-Putilov (4)
- OA vz. 30 (10)
- OA vz. 27 (3)
- BA-10 & BA-64 (103+)

=== Artillery tractors ===
- Malaxa UE (Renault UE Chenillette, French design, 126)
- T-1 tractor (5 prototypes)

=== Demolition vehicles ===
- Romanian Goliath (1 prototype)

== Slovakia ==
=== Tanks ===
- Pz. 38(t)
- Lt.vz 34
- Lt.vz 40
- Lt.vz 35

=== Armoured cars ===
- OA vz 30
- OA vz 27
- Tancik vz 33

== South Africa ==
=== Armoured cars ===
- Marmon-Herrington Armoured Car (5,746)

== Soviet Union ==
Source: Zaloga (1984:125, 225).

=== Tankettes ===
- T-27 (3,328 pre-war)

=== Tanks ===
==== Light tanks ====
- T-18
- T-26 (11,218 pre-war)
- T-50 (65)
- T-60 (5,839)
- T-70 (8,226)
- T-80 & T-90 (75)
- BT tanks (8,060 pre-war, including BT-2, BT-5 and BT-7)

==== Amphibious tanks ====
- T-37A, T-38 & T-40

==== Medium tanks ====
- T-28 (503 pre-war)
- T-34 (1,225 pre-war)
  - T-34-76 (33,805)
  - T-34-85 (21,048)
- T-44

==== Heavy tanks ====
- T-35 (61 pre-war)
- SMK (experimental)
- KV (Kliment Voroshilov) (508 pre-war)
  - KV-1 (Kliment Voroshilov 1) (3,015)
  - KV-1S (Kliment Voroshilov 1S) (1,232)
  - KV-85 (Kliment Voroshilov 85) (130)
  - KV-2 (Kliment Voroshilov 2) (334)
- IS-1 heavy tank IS-1 (Iosif Stalin 1)
- IS-2 heavy tank IS-2 (Iosif Stalin 2) (3,590)
- IS-3 heavy tank IS-3 (Iosef Stalin 3) (2,311 including 29 till the end of the war)

=== Self-propelled guns ===
- ZiS-30 (101)
- SU-5
- SU-14 super heavy SPG (2 prototypes, both took part in indirect fire against the Germans in Kubinka)
- SU-76 (14,292)
- SU-85 tank destroyer (2,644)
- SU-100 tank destroyer (2,495)
- SU-122 self-propelled howitzer (638)
- SU-152 (671)
- ISU-122/ISU-152 (4,635)
- SU-26 (12 or 14)
- Object 704 tank destroyer
- ISU-152 tank destroyer

==== Rocket artillery ====
- Katyusha (10,000)

==== Anti-aircraft ====
- M-4 GAZ AA motorized quad Russian M1910 Maxim guns
- ZiS-42 motorized 25 mm
- YaG-10 motorized 76.2 mm
- T-90 anti-aircraft tank (dual 12.7 mm DShK)
- ZSU-25 dual 25 mm
- ZSU-37 37 mm

=== Armoured cars ===
- D-8
- FAI (636 pre-war)
- BA-20 (2,013)
- LB-23
- BA-64 (8,174)
- BA-27
- BA-I
- BA-3 (554 pre-war)
- BA-6
- BA-10 (3,311)
- LB-62
- BA-11 (18)

==== Amphibious armoured cars ====
- PB-4
- PB-7
- BAD-2

==== Half-tracks ====
- BA-30

=== Aerosledges ===
- ANT-IV
- NKL-16
- NKL-26
- RF-8
- ASD-400

=== Artillery tractors ===
- Komsomolets (4,041 pre-war)
- T-26-T
- STZ-3 (3,658 pre-war)
- STZ-5 (7,170 pre-war)
- Komintern (1,017 pre-war)
- Voroshilovets (228 pre-war)
- Kommunar (504 pre-war)
- YA-12 (1,666)

=== Improvised AFVs ===
- KhTZ-16 (~90)
- IZ (>5)
- NI tank (~69)

=== Utility vehicles ===
==== Motorcycles ====
- PMZ-A-750
- M-72

==== Light utility vehicles ====
- GAZ-64
- GAZ-67

==== Trucks ====
- GAZ-AA
- GAZ-AAA
- GAZ-MM
- ZIS-5

== Thailand ==
=== Tanks and tankettes ===
- Carden Loyd tankette (~60)
- Type 83 (50)
- Vickers 6-Ton (30)

=== Self-propelled guns ===
==== Anti-aircraft ====
- Type 76 SPAAG (26)

== United Kingdom ==
=== Artillery tractors ===
- AEC Matador (9,000)
- Albion CX22S
- Dragon Mark IV
- Crusader II, Gun Tractor Mk I
- Guy Quad
- Morris C8 Quad FAT (10,000)
- Scammell Pioneer R100 (768)

=== Tanks ===
==== Light tanks ====
- Tank, Light, Mk.II (36)
- Tank, Light, Mk.III
- Tank, Light, Mk.IV
- Tank, Light, Mk.V (22)
- Tank, Light, Mk.VI (1,320)
- Tank, Light, Mk. VII Tetrarch (177)
- Tank, Light, Mk. VIII "Harry Hopkins" (A25) (100)
- Vickers 6 Ton Type B (1,939) – 4 used for training

==== Medium tanks ====
- Tank, Medium, Mk.II
- Sherman Firefly (~2,000) – modification of M4 Sherman.
- M3 Grant – US M3 Medium built to UK specification bought from the Americans
- M4 Sherman

==== Heavy tanks ====
- Tank, Heavy, TOG I (1 prototype)
- Tank, Heavy, TOG II (1 prototype)
- Tank, Heavy Assault, A33 (Excelsior) (only prototypes, not mass-produced or accepted into service)
- Tank, Heavy Assault, Tortoise (A39) (6 prototypes – finished in late 1945 after end of war)
- Tank, infantry, Churchill (A22) (7,368)

==== Cruiser tanks ====
- Tank, Cruiser, Mk.I (A9) (125)
- Tank, Cruiser, Mk. II (A10) (205)
- Tank, Cruiser, Mk. III (A13) (65)
- Tank, Cruiser, Mk. IV (A13 Mk.II) (655)
- Tank, Cruiser, Mk.V, Covenanter (A13 Mk.III) (1,771)
- Tank, Cruiser, Mk.VI, Crusader (A15) (5,700)
- Tank, Cruiser, Mk.VII, Cavalier (A24) (500)
- Tank, Cruiser, Mk.VIII, Centaur (A27L) (950)
- Tank, Cruiser, Mk.VIII, Cromwell (A27M) (4,200)
- Tank, Cruiser, Challenger (A30) (296)
- Tank, Cruiser, Comet I (A34) (United Kingdom) (1,200)
- Tank, Cruiser, Centurion I (A41) – Not used in WWII)

==== Infantry tanks ====
- Tank, infantry, Mk.I, Matilda I (A11) (140)
- Tank, infantry, Tank Mk.II, Matilda II (A12) (2,987)
- Tank, infantry, Mk.III, Valentine (8,275)
- Tank, infantry, Mk.IV, Churchill (A22) (5,460)
- Tank, infantry, Valiant (A38) (1 prototype)
- Tank, infantry, Black Prince (A43) (6 prototypes)

=== Self-propelled guns ===
- Carrier, Valentine, 25pdr gun Mk.I, Bishop (80)
- AEC Mk I Gun Carrier (175)
- 25pdr SP, tracked, Sexton (2,150; built in Canada)
- SP 17pdr, Valentine, Mk.I, Archer (655)
- SP 17pdr, A30 Avenger (250 completed post war)
- 17pdr SP Achilles (1,100)

=== Armoured personnel carriers ===
- Universal carrier (84,120)
- Loyd Carrier (26,000)
- M7 Kangaroo (armoured personnel carrier)
- Terrapin (200), an amphibious vehicle

=== Armoured cars ===
- AEC armoured car (629)
- Daimler armoured car (2,694)
- Daimler scout car (Dingo) (6,626)
- Guy armoured car (101)
- Humber armoured car (5,400)
- Humber light reconnaissance car (over 3,600)
- Humber scout car (at least 4,102)
- Lanchester 6×4 armoured car (35)
- Lynx Canadian version of Daimler Dingo
- Morris light reconnaissance car (over 2,200)
- Morris CS9 (100)
- Rolls-Royce armoured car (76 in service at the start of the war)
- Standard Beaverette (~2,800)
- Staghound armoured car US built (~4,000)

=== Lorries ===
NB: In British nomenclature, a vehicle with load-carrying capacity of less than one imperial ton (20 hundredweight) was designated as a truck.

- AEC armoured command vehicle (415)
- Albion WD.CX24 tank transporter
- Austin K2/Y ambulance. (13,102)
- Austin K3
- Austin K4
- Austin K4 dropside
- Austin K5
- Austin K6 GS
- Austin K6 gantry
- Bedford MW.
- Bedford OXA armoured
- Bedford OXC semi-trailer
- Bedford OXD GS
- Bedford OYC tanker
- Bedford OYD GS
- Bedford QLB Bofors.
- Bedford QLD GS.
- Bedford QLR/QLC radio/communications.
- Bedford QLT troop carrier.
- Crossley Q-Type.
- GMC DUKW six-wheel-drive amphibious truck
- Guy Ant
- Guy Lizard armoured command vehicle (21)
- Humber FWD.
- Karrier K6.
- Leyland Hippo Mk II.
- Morris C4
- Morris ML ambulance
- Morris C8 GS
- Morris commercial CD series
- Morris commercial CS8
- Morris commercial 8x8 GS Terrapin amphibious truck
- Scammell Pioneer semi-trailer SV1S and SV2S (~500)

== United States ==
=== Tanks ===
==== Light tanks ====
- Marmon-Herrington CTLS
- Light tank M2
  - M2A1 (10)
  - M2A2 (239)
  - M2A3 (72)
  - M2A4 (375)
- Light tank M3/M5 (22,743) ("General Stuart", shortened to "Stuart" and unofficially "Honey" in British service)
- Light tank M22 (830) ("Locust" in British service, name adopted by America)
- Light tank M24 (4,731) ("General Chaffee" in British service, name adopted by America)

==== Medium tanks ====
- Medium tank M3 (7,533) (General Lee American tanks purchased by the British under lend-lease.)
- Medium tank M4 (58,000) (General Sherman bought by British from U.S. under lend lease)
- Medium tank M2 (112, used for training only)
- Medium tank M7 -prototype

==== Heavy tanks ====
- Heavy tank M26 Pershing (1,436)
- M6 heavy tank – prototype
- M4A3E2 Sherman "Jumbo" (~290)
- T34 heavy tank – prototype
- T29 heavy tank – prototype
- T28 super-heavy tank a.k.a. 105 mm gun motor carriage T95 (2) – prototype
- T30 heavy tank – prototype
- T14 heavy tank – prototype
- T32 heavy tank – prototype

==== Tank destroyers ====
- M3 gun motor carriage
- M6 gun motor carriage (5,380)
- M10 tank destroyer (6,706)
- M18 Hellcat (2,507)
- M36 tank destroyer (~1,400)
- T25 AT tank destroyer – prototype
- T40/M9 tank destroyer – prototype

=== Self-propelled artillery ===
- M4 mortar carrier 81 mm (572)
- M43 howitzer motor carriage
- M7 Priest 105 mm (3,490) (105mm SP, Priest in British service, Priest name adopted by America)
- M8 howitzer motor carriage 75 mm (1,178) (Scott)
- M14 gun motor carriage 155 mm
- M40 GMC 155 mm
- T18 howitzer motor carriage – prototype
- T82 howitzer motor carriage – prototype
- M21 mortar motor carriage
- T30 howitzer motor carriage
- T34 Calliope
- T40 Whizbang

=== Self-propelled anti-aircraft guns ===
- M13 multiple gun motor carriage
- M16 multiple gun motor carriage
- M15 combination gun motor carriage
- M19 multiple gun motor carriage

=== Armoured personnel carriers ===
- M3 scout car
- Half-track personnel carrier M3 (4,088)

=== Armoured cars ===
- M2 half-track car (13,500)
- M3 halftrack (20,918)
- M8 Greyhound (11,667)
- M20 armored utility car (3,680)
- M9 half-track car (3,500)
- T17 armored car (250)

=== Artillery tractors ===
- M4 tractor
- M5 tractor
- M39 armored utility vehicle

=== Amphibious ===
- Landing Vehicle Tracked (18,620)
- Landing craft, vehicle, personnel (LCVP) or Higgins boat (20,000)
- M29 Weasel
- DUKW (21,147)
- Ford GPA

=== Utility vehicles ===
- 6-ton 6×6 truck cargo truck
- Autocar U8144T 5- to 6-ton 4×4 truck semi-truck
- Chevrolet G506 cargo truck
- Diamond T 4-ton 6×6 truck
- Dodge WC series light trucks
  - Dodge WC54 ambulance
- Ford GTB jeep
- Ford Pygmy jeep
- Harley-Davidson WLA motorcycle
- Kenworth 10-ton 6x6 heavy wrecking truck tow truck
- M2 high-speed tractor aircraft tug
- M19 tank transporter tank transporter
- M25 tank transporter tank transporter
- M425 and 426 tractor truck semi-truck
- Mack model EH trucks cargo truck
- Mack NJU 5-ton 4x4 truck semi-truck
- Mack NM 6-ton 6x6 truck cargo truck
- Mack NO 7½-ton 6x6 truck cargo truck
- Willys MB light truck
- GMC CCKW cargo truck

== Yugoslavia ==
=== Light tanks ===
- Renault FT (45) & M28 Kégresse (10-11)
- Renault R35 (54)

=== Tankettes ===
- Škoda Š-I-D/T-32 (8)
- Škoda Š-I-J ((1)trialed, but not adopted)

==== Self-propelled guns ====
- M3 Stuart modified with various captured German weapons

== See also ==
- List of equipment used in World War II
- List of armoured fighting vehicles of World War II
- List of prototype World War II combat vehicles
- Military equipment of Germany's allies on the Balkan and Russian fronts (1941–45)
- List of U.S. Signal Corps Vehicles
- G-numbers
- Hobarts Funnies
