= List of Belgian military equipment of World War II =

The following is a list of Belgian military equipment of World War II which includes artillery, vehicles and vessels. World War II was a global war that was under way by 1939 and ended in 1945. On 10 May 1940, Nazi Germany, which aimed to dominate Europe, attacked Belgium as part of their war with France. By 28 May 1940 the Belgian mainland had surrendered to German forces, although the colony of Belgian Congo remained independent throughout the war. Belgian power was not restored until final Axis collapse in late 1944. This list covers the equipment of the Belgian Army and the Force Publique of Belgian Congo, but not the Free Belgian Forces or Belgian mainland forces after October 1944, which was equipped completely by foreign forces.

== Knives and bayonets ==
- Fairbairn–Sykes fighting knife

== Small arms ==
=== Pistols ===
- Browning Hi-Power (Pistole Automatique Browning GP 35)
- FN Model 1910
- FN Model 1922
- FN Model 1900
- FN Model 1903
- FN Model 1905
- FN Baby Browning
- Colt M1903 Pocket Hammerless
- Ruby M1915

=== Revolvers ===
- Nagant M1895
- MAS Modele 1892
- Smith & Wesson No. 3
- Webley Bulldog
- Pieper M1893

=== Automatic pistols and submachine guns ===
- MP 28 (Pieper Bayard mle 1934) 1.500-1.811
- MP 18
- STEN Mk II

=== Rifles ===
- Mauser Model 1889 (often modernized to Model 1889/36 version)
- Belgian Mauser Model 1935
- Mauser Model 1893
- Lebel M1886/93
- Mauser Gewehr 98
- Lee-Enfield
- Mosin-Nagant M1891/30
- Winchester M1894
- Mauser K98AZ (Given in reparation payments to Belgium post WW1 and issued to reserve units)

=== Grenades and grenade launchers ===
- Mills bomb

== Machine guns ==
=== Infantry and dual-purpose machine guns ===
- Fusil-mitrailleur Mle 1930 Browning Belgian licensed version of the American BAR M1918A2
- MG 08/15
- Hotchkiss M1909
- Chauchat M1915
- Lewis
- Browning M1919

=== Heavy machine guns ===
- Vickers
- Maxim M1911
- MG 08
- Hotchkiss M1914
- Colt-Browning M1895/14

=== Vehicle and aircraft machine guns ===
- Hotchkiss M1929 machine gun
- Fusil-mitrailleur 1930 (on T-13 and some T-15)

== Artillery ==
=== Infantry mortars ===
- 50mm DBT mortar
- 70mm van Deuren mortar
- Stokes mortar (81mm, also fortress version)

=== Heavy mortars & rocket launchers ===
- 142mm Delattre mortar - fired cluster bombs

=== Field artillery ===
- Canon de 75 mle TA 1877
- Canon de 75 mle GP III (also fortress version)
- Canon de 75 mle GP1 (also fortress version)
- Canon de 75 mle GP II
- Canon de 75 mle TR
- Canon de 75 modele 1934
- Canon de 76 FRC (also fortress version)
- 10 cm K 17 - World War I German gun
- Canon de 120mm L mle 1931 (also fortress version)

=== Fortress and siege guns ===
- 57 mm Cockerill-Nordenfeld
- Canon de 105 mle 1913 Schneider
- 10.5 cm leFH 16 (Obusier de 105 GP)
- 15 cm cannon w/o recoil system - 15 cm sFH 13
- Obusier de 6” - former BL 6-inch Mk I naval gun?
- Canone de 155 L mle 1924
- 17 cm SK L/40 i.R.L. auf Eisenbahnwagen - German rail gun of WWI

=== Anti-tank guns ===
- 47 mm Model 1931 anti-tank gun
- Canon antichar de 60 mm FRC mle. 36 (fortress gun)

== Anti-tank weapons (besides anti-tank guns) ==
- Boys anti-tank rifle (Le Fusil Antichar Boys Mark 1)

== Anti-aircraft weapons ==
=== Light anti-aircraft guns ===
- M1918 Browning Automatic Rifle (on some T-15)
- MG 18 TuF (AA/AT)

=== Heavy anti-aircraft guns ===
- 75 mm FRC M27 (German 8.8 cm SK L/45 naval gun relined to 75mm)
- Belgian M36 (French M32)
- C75 DTCA M34 (French 75 mm CA Mle 1917)
- QF 3.7-inch AA gun

== Vehicles ==
See also Belgian combat vehicles of World War II

=== Tankettes ===
- T-15 Light tank
- T-13 tank destroyer

=== Tanks ===
- Renault FT
- ACG-1 (Renault AMC-35)

=== Armored cars ===
- Minerva Armored Car - World War I vintage
- Berliet VUDB armoured car (12 imported from France in 1930)

=== Trucks ===
- FN Tricar
- FN 63C/4RM

=== Passenger cars ===
- Adler 2 Liter

=== Motorcycles ===
FN 12a SM

=== Tractors & prime movers ===
- Vickers Carden Loyd Utility Tractor - 3 models
- Ford- Marmon-Herrington Armoured Car - unarmed tractor version built by Ford Antwerp
- FN-Kégresse 3T half-track
- Citroën Kégresse P14 half-track

== Navy ships and war vessels ==
- Belgian ship A4
- HMS Buttercup (K193)
- HMS Godetia (K226)

List of ships of the Second World War

== Aircraft ==
- Koolhoven F.K.56
- Fairey Firefly II
- Fairey Fox
- Hawker Hurricane
- Renard R.35B - design plans only
- Renard R.36
- Airco DH.4 - built in 1926, as transport only at outbreak of war
- SABCA S.40 - trainer
- Caproni Ca.135 (license-build as SABCA S.45)
- Caproni Ca.310 (license-build as SABCA S.46)
- Caproni Ca.335 (license-build as SABCA S.47)
- Caproni Ca.312 (license-build as SABCA S.48)
- Fiat CR.42 Falco
- Stampe et Vertongen SV.4 - trainer
- Stampe et Vertongen SV.5
- Stampe et Vertongen SV.10
- Fairey Battle
- Fokker F.VII

== See also ==
- List of Australian military equipment of World War II
- List of British military equipment of World War II
- List of Bulgarian military equipment of World War II
- List of military equipment of the Canadian Army during the Second World War
- List of Chinese military equipment in World War II
- List of Croatian military equipment of World War II
- List of Dutch military equipment of World War II
- List of World War II weapons of France
- List of German military equipment of World War II
- List of Italian Army equipment in World War II
- List of Japanese military equipment of World War II
- Military equipment of Sweden during World War II
- List of Thailand military equipment of World War II
- List of equipment of the United States Army during World War II
