= Belgian combat vehicles of World War II =

List of Belgian combat vehicles

The Belgian Army had approximately 200 combat vehicles at the time of the German invasion in May 1940. The vehicles were distributed among infantry and cavalry divisions for use as support weapons. The Belgian Army viewed their combat vehicles as defensive weapons. The practice of spreading out combat vehicles in so called "penny packets" (also used in the French Army at the same time) left them at a disadvantage against the German invaders, who concentrated their armour into organic units that could act on their own and that outnumbered the opposing vehicles even if units of the same type met.

The Belgian Army had started to motorize its cavalry in 1936, spending 200 million Belgian Francs in the process.

== Tanks ==
=== T15 light tank ===
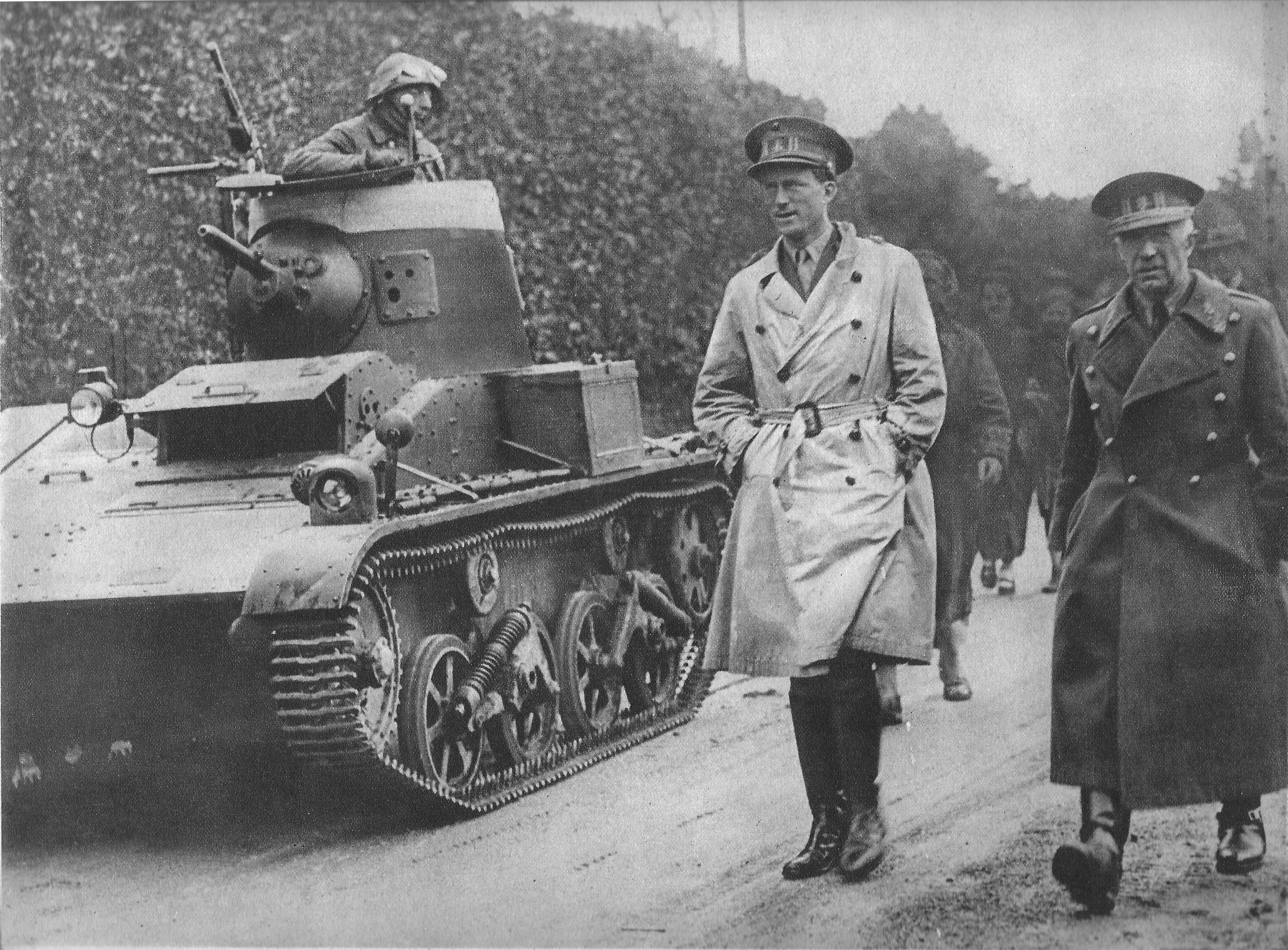
A T-15 light tank, being reviewed by King Leopold III in 1940

The T15 was a version of the British Carden Loyd tankette (Char Léger de Reconnaissance Vickers-Carden-Loyd Mod.1934 T.15). They had a two-man crew and were armed with a French 13.2 mm Hotchkiss machine gun in the turret. A total of 42 of these tanks were assigned to Belgian units.

=== T13 (tank destroyer, models B1, B2 and B3) ===
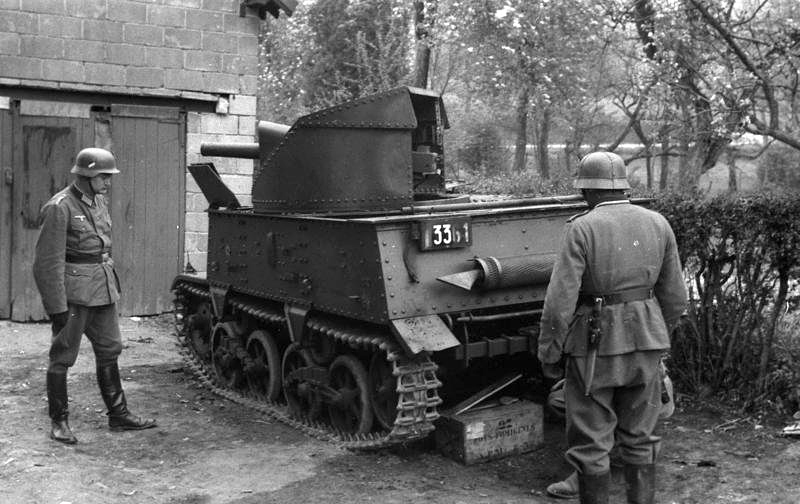
Two German soldiers looking at a captured T13 B3

The T13 series was similar to the T15, with a main armament of a 47 mm anti-tank gun instead of a machine gun and 6–13 mm (0.24–0.51 in) of armour. They were regarded as tank destroyers and except the first model (B1) had rotating turrets.

Total production for the T13:

- T13 B1, 35 produced as self-propelled guns, with a 47 mm gun at the rear behind a shield, with limited traverse.
- T13 B2, 21 produced. These started their life as unarmed Carden Loyd tankettes which were modified and equipped with a turret with a 47 mm gun in 1936.
- T13 B3, 150 produced, entered service in 1937 with a rotating turret and a revised suspension based on the Vickers Light Dragon Mark IIB.

The Wehrmacht operated some captured T13s during the first years of the war, as the T13 had a more powerful main gun than the Panzer I and Panzer II, common German tanks in the early war years.

There is a T13 B2 on display at Brussels Tank Museum.

=== ACG-1 tank ===
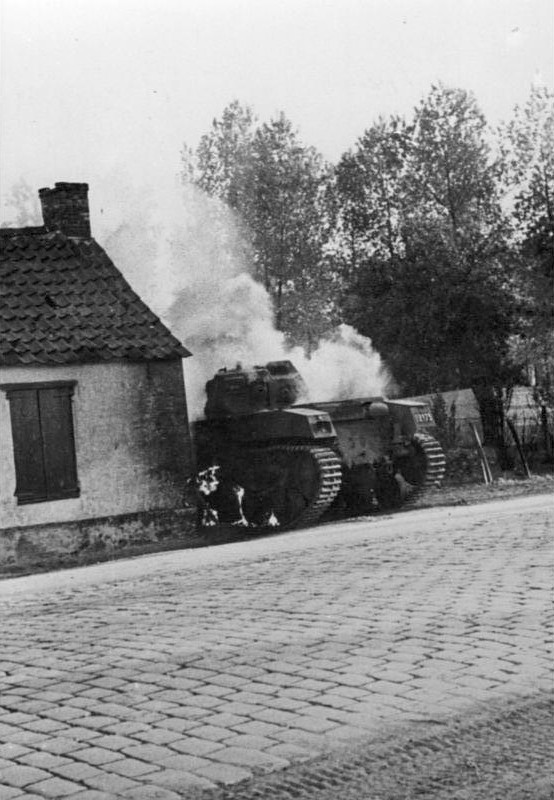
Knocked-out ACG1

The Renault AMC 35 tank, known locally as the ACG-1, was armed with a 47 mm gun and a coaxial machine gun; 25 tanks were ordered, although only 10 were accepted into the Belgian army due to production delays. The Belgian ACG-1 and the AMC 35 had different turrets. Instead of waiting for the other tanks to arrive the Belgian army created the T-13 B3, also armed with a 47 mm C.47 gun. A squadron of ACG-1 was mobilised in 1939 but only 8 could be made operational of those in storage. The 47 mm main gun in the ACG1 was the same anti-tank gun then in service with the Belgian Army.

=== Renault FT tank ===
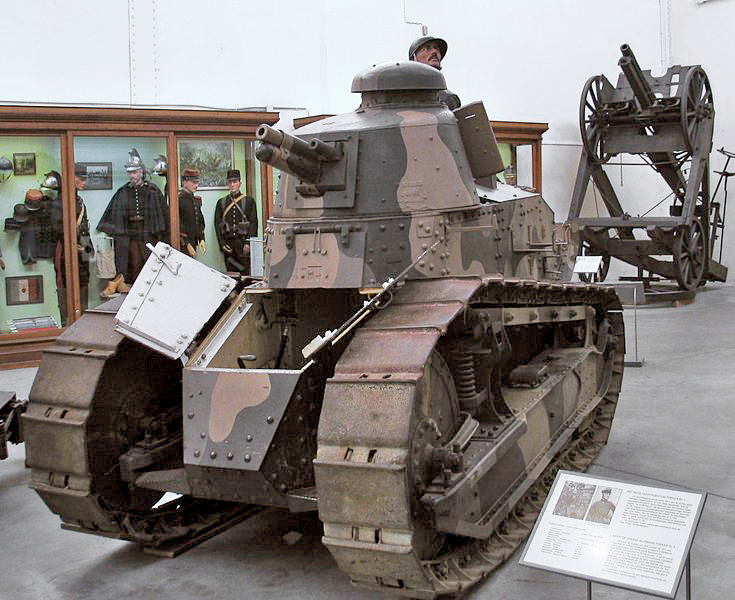
Renault FT at the Brussels Royal Army Museum

The Belgian army had 75 Renault FT tanks (of World War I vintage) at the start of World War II. The Belgian Army had two types of FT tanks, the Char canon armed with a short 37 mm Puteaux SA-18 gun and the Char mitrailleuse armed with a machine gun. Unlike the French Army, the Belgian Army had withdrawn all FT tanks from front line service before World War II. They remained in storage depots during the 1940 campaign.

== Post-1944 ==
After the Belgian liberation in late 1944, the Belgian army used American and British equipment until the end of the war.

== See also ==
- Belgium in World War II
- Order of battle of armour units of the Belgian Army in May 1940
- List of World War II military vehicles by country
- List of Belgian military equipment of World War II
