= ANT-IV =

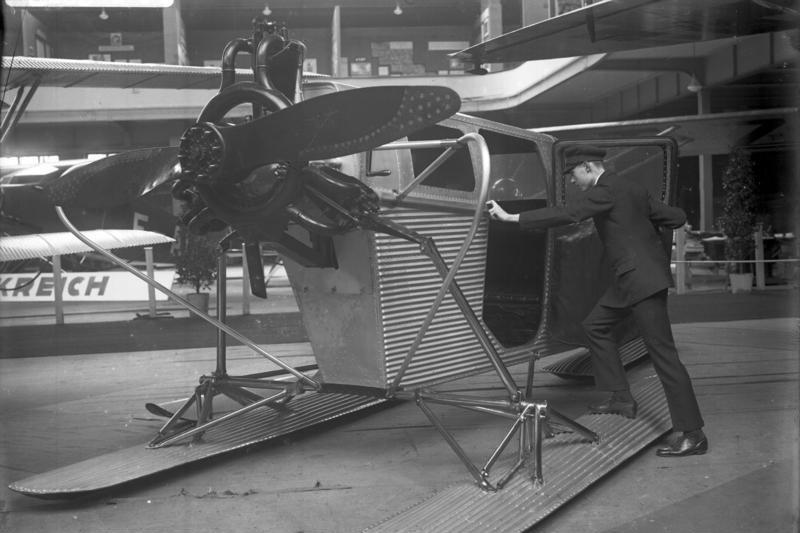
- Type: Aerosan
- Place of origin: Soviet Union

Specifications
- Crew: 2

The ANT-IV was one of three aerosans introduced in 1924. This model, operated by a crew of two, doubled the ANT-III's 50 horsepower (37 kW) with its new Bristol engine, and outperformed the ANT-V's 100 horsepower (75 kW) Fiat engine.

In 1930 the ANT-IV began regular trips between Cheboksar and Kanash, carrying mail and priority passengers. The following year the ANT-IVs were overhauled with Soviet-produced M-11 radial aviation engines, allowing them to travel at 28 km/h.

In 1934, an ANT-IV was delivered aboard the Smolensk to Ualen where it helped rescue remotely stranded explorers from the icebreaker Chelyuskin.
