= Škoda Š-I-j =

- Type: Tankette
- Place of origin: Czechoslovakia

Production history
- Designer: Škoda
- Designed: 1938
- Manufacturer: Škoda
- Produced: 1938
- No. built: 1

Specifications
- Mass: 5.8 t (6.4 short tons)
- Length: 3.58 m (11 ft 9 in)
- Width: 2.05 m (6 ft 9 in)
- Height: 1.8 m (5 ft 11 in)
- Crew: 2 (commander, driver)
- Armor: 30 mm front, 15 mm sides, 12 rear, 20 mm floor
- Main armament: 47 mm A-9J Gun
- Secondary armament: 7.92 mm Vz.30J Machine Gun
- Engine: Unknown diesel type with 44 kW 2200 rpm, 3.77 liter
- Maximum speed: 31 km/h (19 mph)

Škoda Š-I-j was a tankette developed by Škoda company for Yugoslavia. Only one prototype was ever created, The Yugoslavian Royal Army decided against ordering production of this vehicle. In the Š in name stands for Škoda, I or one in roman refers to category of vehicle(I for tankette, II for light tank, III for medium tank).
