= Marmon–Herrington CTLS =

Marmon-Herrington CTLS
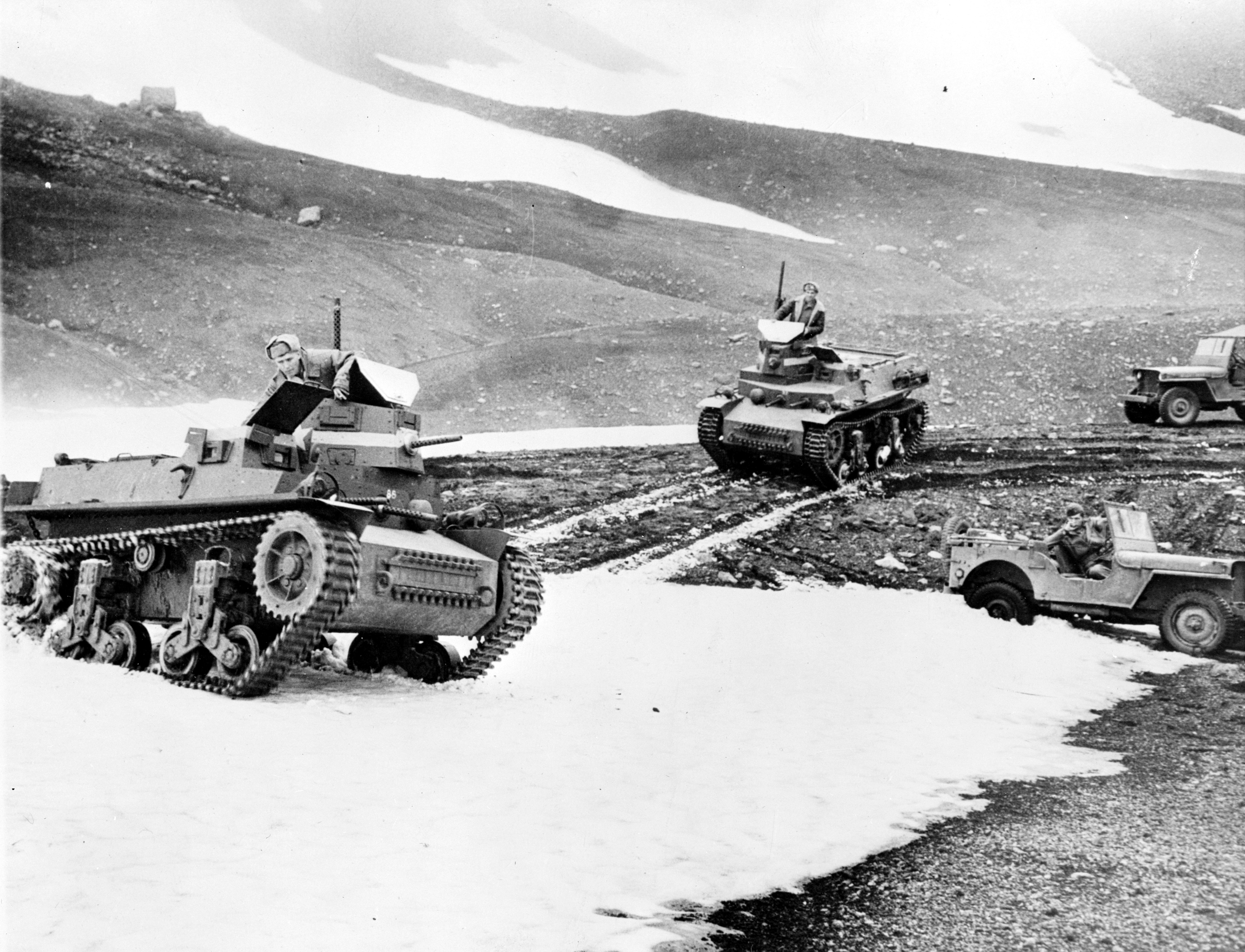
- Marmon-Herrington CTLS tanks (a CTLS-4TAC in the foreground and a CTLS-4TAY in the background) in Alaska, summer of 1942.
- Type: Light tank/tankette
- Place of origin: United States

Service history
- Used by: Netherlands; United States; Cuba (Note: Used by the Republic of Cuba during World War II and briefly after the Cuban Revolution under the Communist Party led by Fidel Castro.); Empire of Japan; Indonesia; Republic of China
- Wars: World War II; Indonesian National Revolution; Cuban Revolution

Production history
- Manufacturer: Marmon-Herrington
- No. built: 875

Specifications (For CTLS-3)
- Mass: 9,500 lb (4,300 kg), 10,900 lb (4,900 kg)
- Length: 11 ft 6 in (3.51 m)
- Width: 6 ft 10 in (2.08 m)
- Height: 6 ft 11 in (2.11 m)
- Crew: 2 (driver, gunner)
- Armour: up to 0.50 in (12.7 mm)
- Main armament: 1 × .50 cal (12.7 mm) M2 Browning machine gun
- Secondary armament: 2 × .30 cal (7.62 mm) M1919 Browning machine guns
- Engine: Lincoln V-12, Hercules 6-cylinder gasoline engine 120 hp (89 kW)
- Suspension: Bogie leaf suspension
- Operational range: 125 mi (201 km)
- Maximum speed: 33 mph (53 km/h)

The Marmon-Herrington Combat Tank Light Series were a series of American light tanks/tankettes that were produced for the export market at the start of the Second World War. The CTL-3 had a crew of two and was armed with two .30 cal (7.62 mm) M1919 machine guns and one .50 cal (12.7 mm) M2 Browning machine gun. They were originally designed to be amphibious light tanks. They were rejected by the U.S. Marine Corps in 1939, but after the attack on Pearl Harbor they were exported and used as an emergency light tank.

It primarily served in Alaska and the Dutch East Indies, while small numbers were used in the U.S. as guard tanks stationed along the U.S. coast. A total of about 700 examples were produced, and although it was declared obsolete by the Allies in 1943, it was used by the newly created Indonesian Army after the end of the Second World War, remaining in Indonesian service until 1949.

== Design and development ==
In the mid-1930s, the U.S. Marines required a light tank that could be used in amphibious operations. After trials with Christie amphibious tanks, Marmon Herrington produced a light, turretless tank with a 0.5 in (12.7 mm) M2 machine gun and two .30 cal (7.62 mm) M1919 machine guns. This was the first light tank to meet USMC standards when it was designed. With a crew of two, consisting of the driver and gunner, and protected by up to 0.5 in (12.7 mm) of armor, it was named the Combat Tank Light 3 (CTL-3). All three machine guns were mounted on ball mounts on the front hull.

Fitted with bogie leaf suspension, the tank was 6 ft 10 in (2.08 m) wide, 11 ft 6 in (3.51 m) long, with a height of 6 ft 11 in (2.11 m). It weighed 4.7 short tons; 4.2 long tons (4,300 kg), and was powered by a Lincoln V-12, Hercules 6-cylinder gasoline engine, providing 120 hp (89 kW). It was capable of speeds of up to 33 mph (53 km/h), and had a range of 125 mi (201 km). Five prototypes were produced in 1936 to be tested. Five more were produced in 1939. Tests continued until 1940, after which the Marine Corps deemed it obsolete because of the goals to make it amphibious which left it with fragile tracks and weak armor. The Marine Corps thus relegated it to training use only.

== Service history ==
=== American use ===
A small number were used by the US Marine Corps' 1st Tank and 1st Scout Companies prior to the war. Some were employed on Western Samoa. None of those tanks saw action. After the attack on Pearl Harbor, the Ordnance Committee determined that a few CTLS-4TAC and 4TAYs would be dispersed to the U.S. Army and employed in the Aleutian Islands campaign. Under Ordnance Committee Minutes (OCM) 18526, these examples were subsequently designated as the Light Tank T16 and Light Tank T14 respectively.

=== Foreign use ===
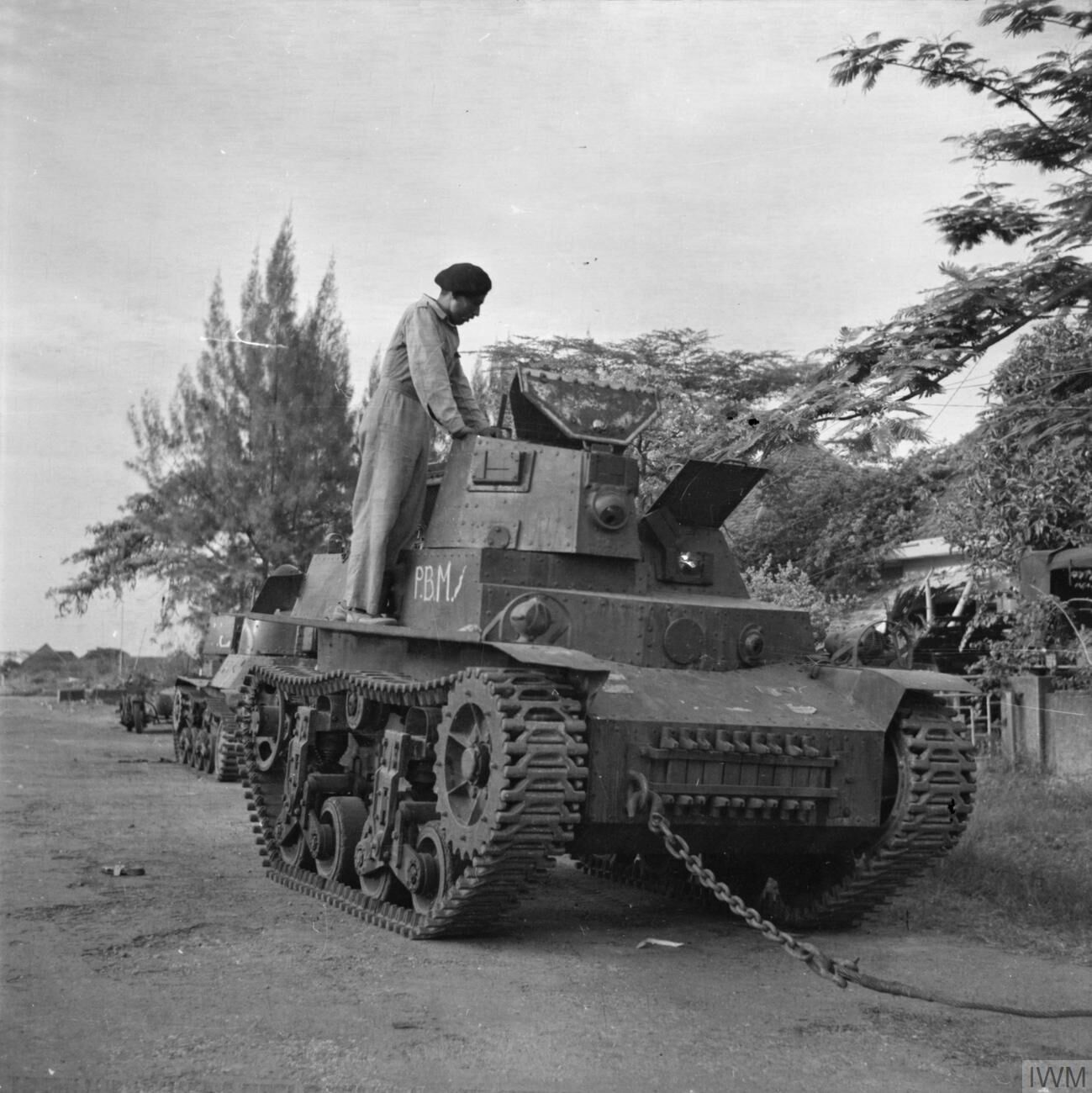
A damaged Marmon-Herrington CTLS-4TAC in Surabaya, 1945.

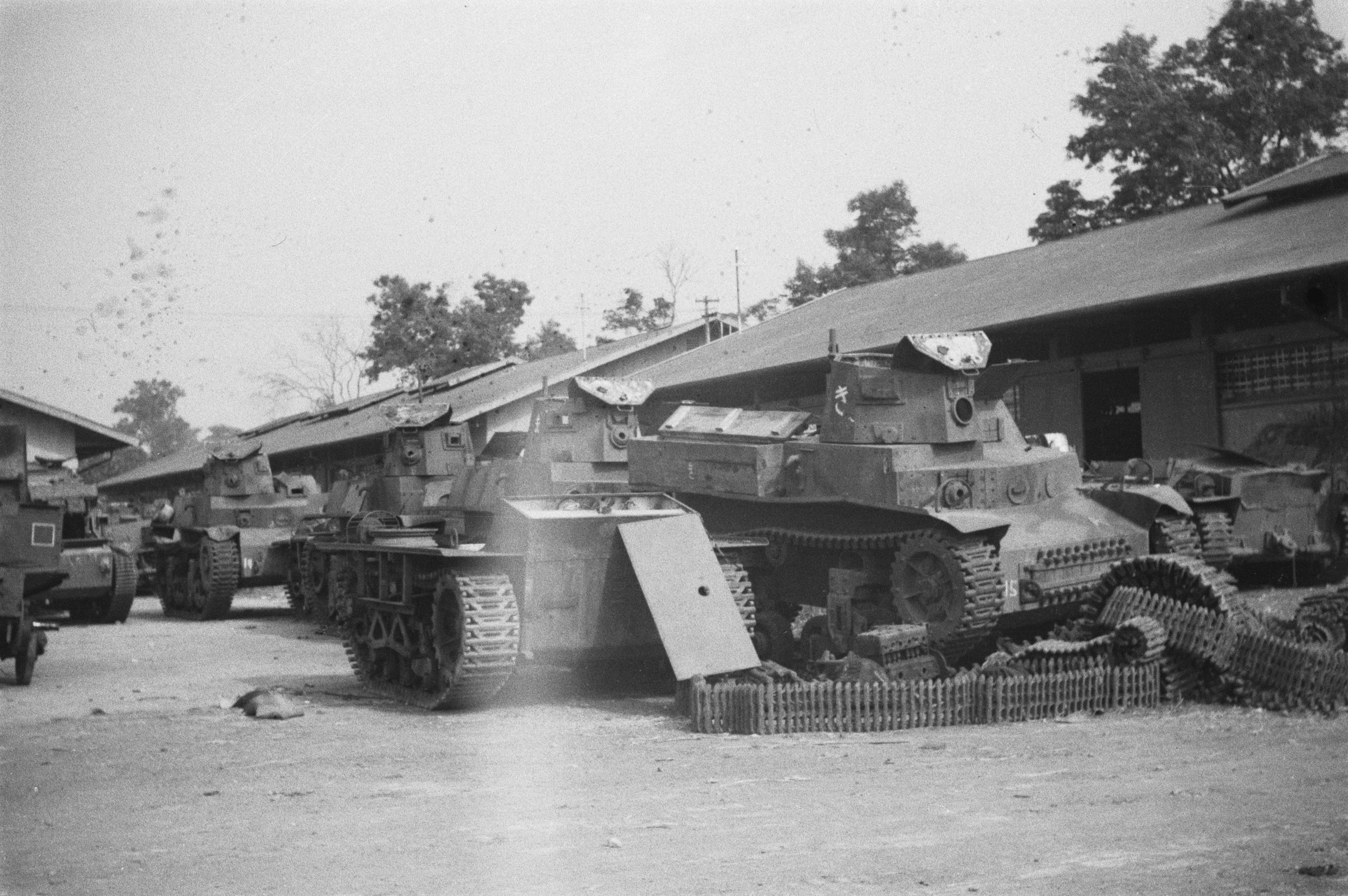
Wrecked ex-Japanese Marmon-Herrington CTLS-4TA tanks at a workshop in Bandung, 1946.

Several hundred CTMS tanks were ordered by the Royal Netherlands East Indies Army. Of these, a small number were delivered to Java, just in time to see combat in the Dutch East Indies campaign following the Japanese invasion in early 1942, and then some of them were captured by Imperial Japanese Army. 149 from this order were diverted to Australia where they were used for training. 600 CTLS-4TACs and 4TAYs were delivered to China under Lend-Lease after Pearl Harbor. But supplying China with heavy equipment quickly proved a logistical nightmare, and having already been promised several hundred M2A4s and M3 Stuarts, China rejected the design. This left the US Army with 240 tanks it had paid for, but China didn't want to be supplied with. After the war, the Indonesian Army is reported to have used several captured Japanese vehicles, which were captured from the Dutch, with the type remaining in Indonesian service until 1949 amidst the Indonesian National Revolution.

== Variants ==
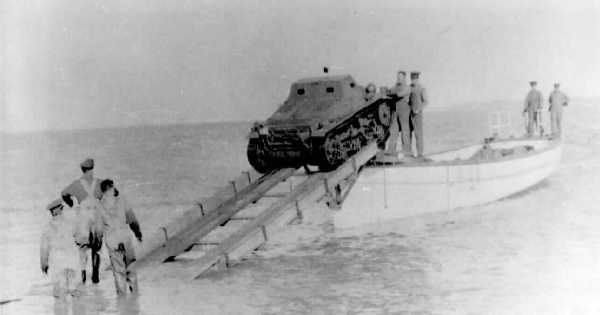
A CTL-3 being tested by the U.S. Marines.

- CTL-1 – Designed by Marmon-Herrington to be shipped to the Persian Army, but it was rejected by them. Only one was ever produced.
- CTL-2 – A CTL-1 with slightly thicker armor.
- CTL-3 – A Tankette, fitted with one 12.7 mm (.50 cal) M2 Browning machine gun and two .30 cal (7.62 mm) M1919 machine guns. It was only a prototype. Five were produced in 1936, while another five were produced in 1939. All of them were upgraded to CTL-3M standard in 1941. Two tank platoons were assigned the CTL-3. All of the vehicles were scrapped in 1943.
- CTL-3A – An improved version of the CTL-3. The only difference was improved suspension.
- CTL-3M – An improved version of the CTL-3. All of the CTL-3s were upgraded to this standard in 1941.
- CTL-3TBD – An upgraded version of the CTL-3, although the only differences were improved tracks, suspension and the addition of an M2 machine gun. The two M2 machine guns were mounted in a turret. Only five were produced and all of them were scrapped in Samoa in 1943.
- CTLS-4TAC – Designed for export under Lend-Lease, a total of 420 were produced, originally intended for China. Six hundred 4TACs and 4TAYs were sent to China after Pearl Harbor. The remaining 240 were dispersed for emergency situations, like in Alaska. The armor was doubled and the armament consisted of three 7.62 mm (.30 cal) Colt MG38BT machine guns, one of which was mounted in a 240° traverse, hand-cranked turret. Under OCM 18526, the CTLS-4TAC was labeled Light Tank T16. All vehicles were scrapped in 1943.
- CTLS-4TAY – A CTLS-4TAC with the driver and the turret sitting on the left side of the hull. 420 were produced.
- CTL-6 – The CTL-6 was an improved version of the CTL-3. The only differences were better tracks and suspension. Only 20 were produced. They served in two tank platoons, which were sent to Samoa. All of them were scrapped there in 1943.

== Branching projects ==
Two other tank designs were produced by Marmon-Herrington that branched directly from the CTLS. They were both intended to be shipped to the Dutch, but were taken over by the Ordnance Department.

=== CTMS-1TB1 ===
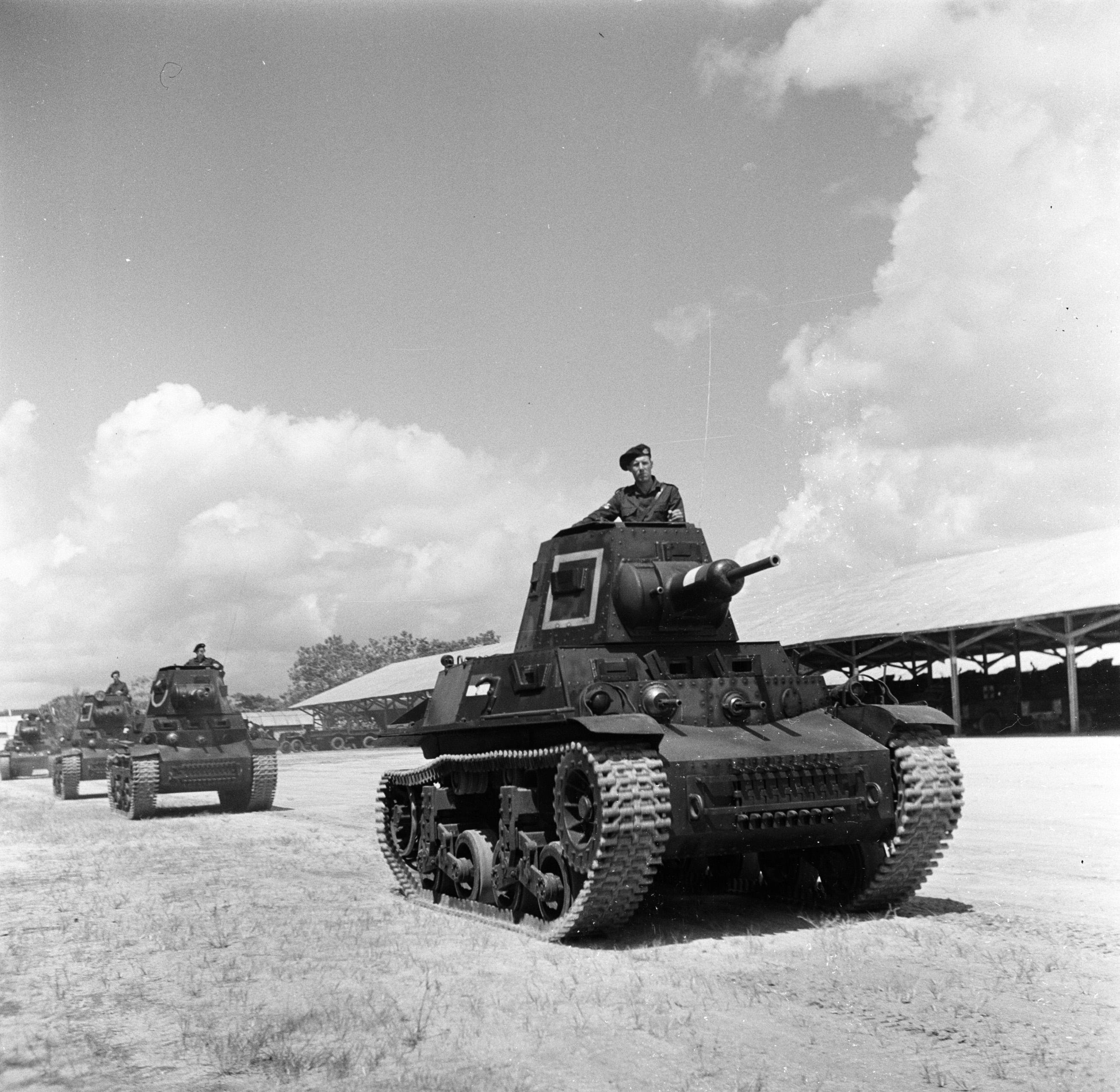
CTMS-1TB1 tanks in Paramaribo, Surinam, 1947

The CTMS-1TB1 project was started in 1941 as private design to produce a light tank with a crew of three. It was armed with a 37 mm (1.5 in) automatic cannon and coaxial M1919 machine gun. That same year, Dutch authorities ordered 194 of these vehicles for service in the Dutch East Indies (later Indonesia) with Dutch East Indies Army (KNIL) cavalry platoons. However, none of these vehicles had left the United States by the time that Dutch forces had surrendered and the Dutch East Indies was officially occupied by Japan (8 March 1942).

The US government later commandeered 62 vehicles that had been manufactured for the KNIL. During early 1943, two were tested at the US Army's Aberdeen Proving Grounds . As more robust light tanks were already being produced in sufficient numbers, the US Army officially declined the CTMS-1TB1, in May 1943.

Free Dutch forces received 26 of the tanks declined by the US Army; these were shipped to Dutch Guiana (present-day Suriname). They served with a detachment of the Prinses Irene Brigade until its deactivation in January 1946. These tanks returned to service with Dutch forces in Dutch Guiana in mid-1947. Due to their worsening technical condition only 16 were operational by 1950. The last CTMS-1TB1 in Dutch service was retired in 1957.

The US government also leased a few dozen examples of the CTMS-1TB1 to Latin American countries, including Mexico, Guatemala, Ecuador and Cuba. The last of these were retired by the Cuban Army during the 1960s.

=== MTLS-1G14 ===
The MTLS-1G14 project was started at the same time as the CTMS-1TB1 to produce a four-man medium tank for the Dutch Army. It was armed with two 1.5 in (37 mm) automatic cannons. It also was equipped with five M1919 machine guns, three of which were mounted on the hull, one mounted coaxially, and one mounted on the top of the turret. The armor was bolted on and measured between 0.5–1.5 in (13–38 mm) thick. The design was soon taken over by the Ordnance Department and was tested at Aberdeen in April 1943. It was rejected by the U.S. Army because it was deemed unsatisfactory in almost every respect.

== See also ==
- List of U.S. military vehicles by supply catalog designation
- T-40 — a comparable Soviet design
- M22 Locust — another Marmon–Herrington light tank
