= PZInż 302 =

Polish military truck

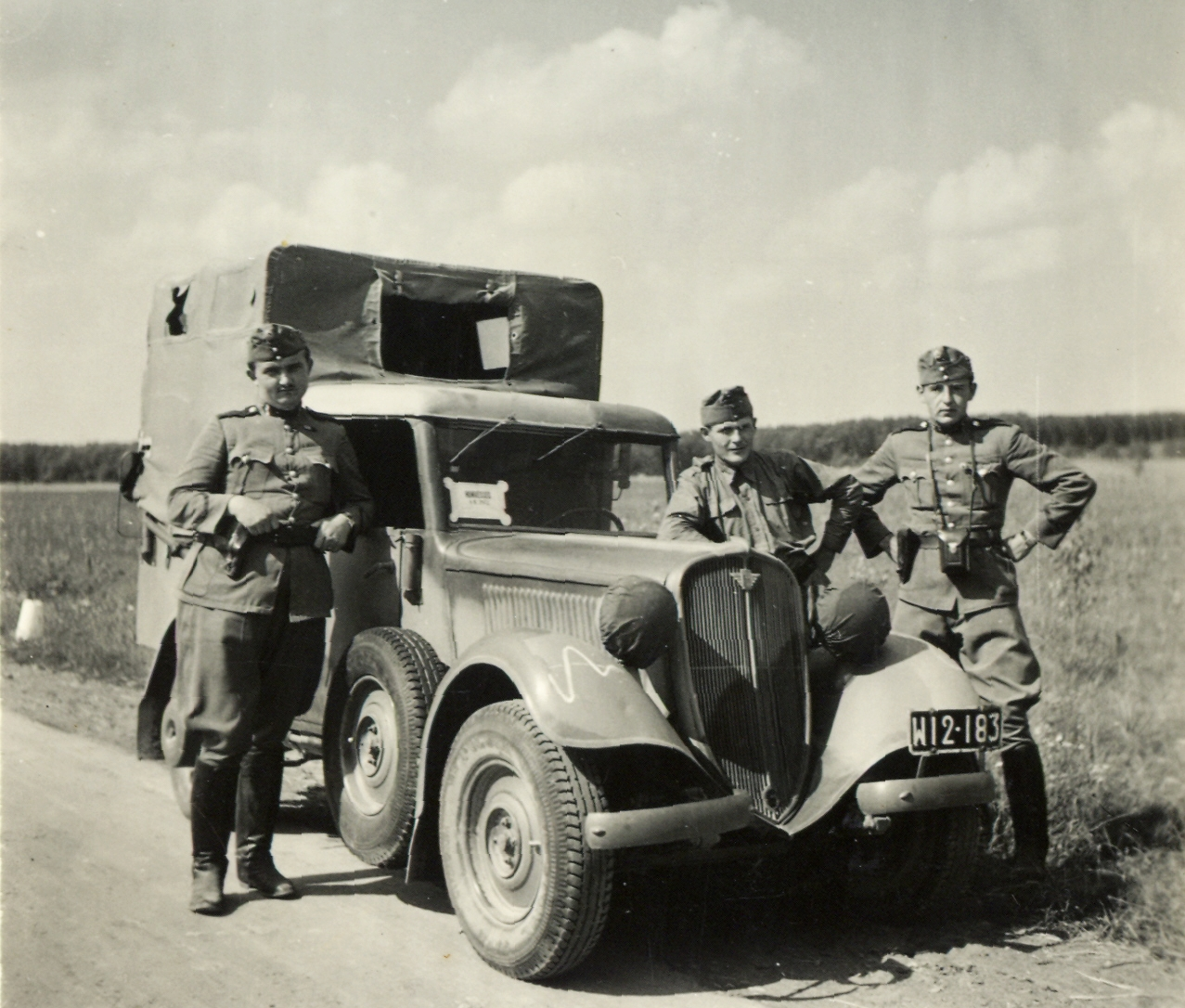
- PZInż 302 of the Hungarian army, one of the vehicles obtained from interned Polish troops in September 1939

Overview
- Manufacturer: Państwowe Zakłady Inżynieryjne

Powertrain
- Engine: 995 cm^{3} FIAT 108 (PZInż 117)

Dimensions
- Length: 3,540 mm
- Width: 1,580 mm
- Height: 1,460 mm
- Curb weight: 950 kg

The PZInż 302, also known as Polski Fiat 508/518, was a Polish military truck and light artillery tractor. Designed and built by Państwowe Zakłady Inżynieryjne works (hence the PZInż 302 name), it used a large number of parts from both the Polski Fiat 508 all-terrain vehicle and Polski Fiat 518 car. It was produced in a variety of versions, including light truck/pick-up truck, radio vehicle and towing tractor for the Bofors 37 mm.

The truck's carrying capacity was 5 artillerymen and 80 rounds of ammunition for the Bofors. The 10th Motorized Cavalry Brigade (Poland) and the Warsaw Armoured Motorized Brigade also used the 508/518 in an anti-aircraft role.

After the Invasion of Poland was over, a number of PZInż 302 vehicles fell into the hands of the Germans. Later, some of these vehicles were incorporated into the equipment of the Wehrmacht.

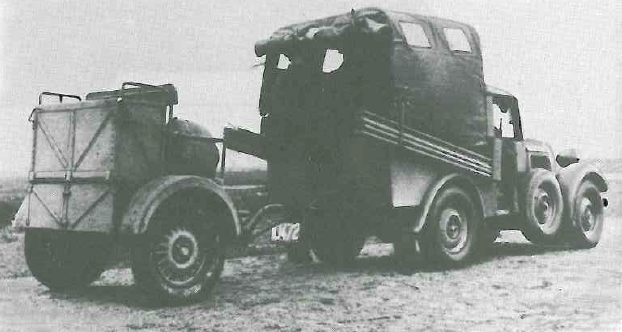
Polski Fiat 508/518, wariant dla zmotoryzowanego patrolu telefonicznego
