= OA vz. 27 =

Czechoslovak armored car

- A painting of an OA vz. 27. Note that the rear is to the left
- Type: Armored car
- Place of origin: Czechoslovakia

Service history
- In service: 1929−44
- Used by: See users
- Wars: World War II

Production history
- Designer: Škoda
- Designed: 1925−27
- Manufacturer: Škoda
- Unit cost: 626,770 Czechoslovak koruna
- Produced: 1929
- No. built: 15 + 1 prototype

Specifications
- Mass: 6.6 tonnes (6.5 long tons; 7.3 short tons)
- Length: 5.35 metres (17.6 ft)
- Width: 1.95 metres (6.4 ft)
- Height: 2.66 metres (8.7 ft)
- Crew: 5
- Armor: 3–5.5 millimetres (0.12–0.22 in)
- Main armament: 2 x 7.92 mm (0.312 in) Schwarzlose MG vz. 07/24 machine guns
- Secondary armament: 1 x 7.92 mm (0.312 in) ZB vz. 26 machine gun
- Engine: 4-cylinder Škoda gasoline 60 horsepower (45 kW)
- Transmission: 4 x 2
- Operational range: 250 kilometres (160 mi)
- Maximum speed: 35 kilometres per hour (22 mph)

The OA vz. 27 (Obrněný automobil vzor 27) was a Czechoslovak-designed armored car used by Nazi Germany, Slovakia, and Romania during World War II. Fifteen were built, of which the Germans seized nine when they occupied Bohemia-Moravia in March 1939 and the Slovaks captured three when they declared independence from Czechoslovakia at the same time. Romania acquired three when Czech troops sought refuge in Romania after the Hungarian invasion of Carpatho-Ukraine that same month. All were used for training or internal security duties during the war.

== Description ==
Skoda OA vz. 27 during a parade

The OA vz. 27's armored body was mounted on a purpose-built ladder frame chassis. The chassis design was unusual as it could be driven in both directions as it had both forward and rear drivers. Both axles could be driven and steered, but not at the same time as the reverser lever controlled the direction of travel and which axle was being used so it was not a true four-wheel drive design. The forward driver sat on the right side using an observation port protected by an armored shutter with a vision slit. The assistant driver sat on the left and had his own vision port. The rear driver sat on the vehicle's left side. A heavy Schwarzlose MG vz. 07/24 water-cooled machine gun was mounted in the center of the rear hull with 72° of traverse. The crew accessed the fighting compartment from doors in both sides of the vehicle and a hatch in the turret. The gunner sat in a small, conical turret with 360° of traverse. It had an observation port in the front, vision slits on both sides and an armored searchlight on a swing arm in the rear. The turret had a Schwarzlose MG vz. 07/24 machine gun in a forward-facing ball mount and two other ball mounts were fitted on the sides of the turret. A ZB vz. 26 light machine gun was carried inside the vehicle. 5750 rounds were stored for the machine guns. The body had an internal frame of steel "angle iron" beams to which 5.5 mm (0.22 in) armor plates were riveted.

The 5.7 litres (350 cu in), water-cooled, 60 horsepower (45 kW), 4-cylinder Škoda gasoline engine was mounted in the front of the vehicle. It gave a top speed of 35 kilometres per hour (22 mph). It could cross a ditch .4 metres (1.3 ft) wide, climb an obstacle .2 metres (0.66 ft) high and ford a stream .3 metres (0.98 ft) deep.

== Development ==
The OA vz. 27 was the third in a line of Škoda armored cars that used the same revolutionary chassis design. The PA-I introduced the two driver concept, but it had four-wheel drive and four-wheel steering and a turret with two machine guns. Only two prototypes were built before the army asked for further improvements. The PA-II kept the same chassis, but dropped the turret in a completely new body design with curved plates that mounted a machine gun in each corner of the vehicle. The curved armor was very good ballistically, but was quite expensive to manufacture. Twelve were ordered, but the cramped fighting compartment and lack of space for both gunners to man their weapons simultaneously meant that the army was still not satisfied.

The PA-III was intended to be smaller, more mobile and less expensive than its predecessors. Flat armor plates replaced the curved armor of the PA-II and a turret was reintroduced. One prototype was bought in 1925 with an iron body and evaluated for two years before it was accepted in July 1927. Twelve chassis had already been delivered in 1925 while the Army tried to decide the best layout of the body, but it took almost another two years before the last OA vz. 27, as the Army designated the P-III, was delivered in October 1929.

== Operational history ==
=== Czechoslovakia ===
In service they proved to be robust, easy to maintain and easy to shoot as optical sights had been added for the machine guns. The main drawback was their excessive weight and very high cost (626,770 CSK - around 25,000 USD). Six were initially assigned to the Armored Regiment in Milovice and the remaining nine to the cavalry, but this changed during the reorganization of the armored units in the mid-Thirties. The 1st Armored Regiment received an additional three for a total of nine while the 2nd Armored Regiment in Olomouc got three as did the 3rd Armored Regiment in Turčiansky Svätý Martin. The OA vz. 27s were heavily used suppressing the protests and violence instigated by Konrad Henlein's Sudeten German Party (Sudetendeutsche Partei - SdP) and the Sudetendeutsche Freikorps (paramilitary groups trained in Germany by SS-instructors) between May and October 1938. After the Munich Agreement one platoon of OA vz. 27s were sent to reinforce Slovakia and Ruthenia where they were used to repel Hungarian and Polish border-crossers, sometimes up to a battalion in strength. One platoon of three vehicles defended Carpatho-Ukraine in March 1939 from Hungarian attacks, but were forced to seek refuge in Romania and Slovakia acquired three when it declared independence in March 1939.

=== Germany ===
The Germans seized nine in March 1939 when they occupied Bohemia-Moravia, but nothing is known of their service (if any).

=== Slovakia ===
Three OA vz. 27s were seized by the Slovaks when they declared independence in March 1939, but were used only for training and scrapped in February 1943.

=== Romania ===
Little is known about the career of the OA vz. 27 in Romania after one Czech platoon of three sought refuge there in March 1939 other than it performed internal security duties. Two were destroyed during one of the American bombing raids on Ploiesti during the summer of 1944 while being serviced at the depot there.

== Users ==
- Czechoslovakia
- Nazi Germany
- Romania
- Slovakia
