= T-13 tank destroyer =

T-13 Tank destroyer
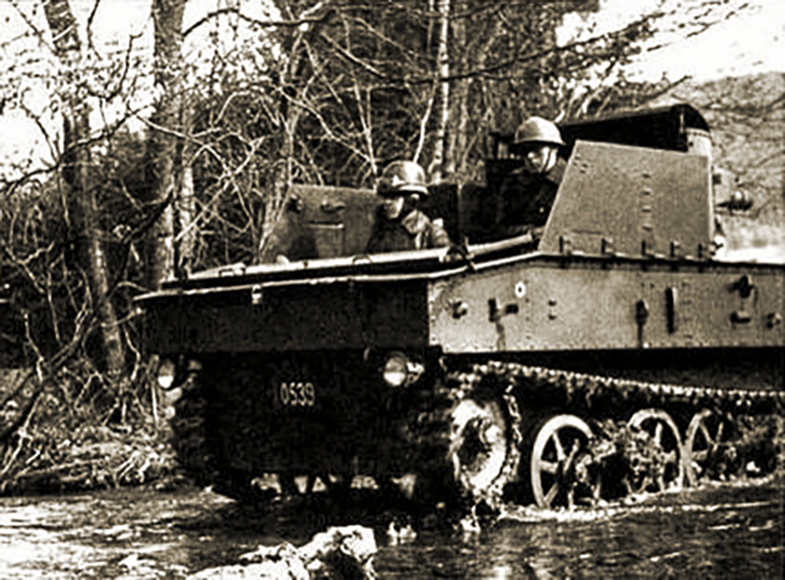
- T-13 B2 fording a creek during field exercises
- Type: Tank destroyer
- Place of origin: United Kingdom/Belgium

Service history
- In service: 1936-1944
- Used by: Belgium; France; Nazi Germany (captured)
- Wars: Second World War

Production history
- Designer: Vickers, Miesse, Familleheureux
- Designed: 1934
- Manufacturer: Vickers and Familleheureux
- Produced: 1935-1940
- No. built: 303-311
- Variants: B1, B2, B3

Specifications (B3)
- Mass: 5.08 ton
- Length: 3.65 m (12 ft 0 in)
- Width: 1.87 m (6 ft 2 in) (Note: 1.76 m (5 ft 9 in) for B1 and B2)
- Height: 1.84 m (6 ft 0 in) (Note: 1.69 m (5 ft 7 in) for B1 and B2)
- Crew: 3-4 : commander/gunner, driver, loader
- Armor: 7–13 mm (0.28–0.51 in) (Note: 6–12 mm (0.24–0.47 in) for B1, B2)
- Main armament: 47 mm Model 1931 anti-tank gun
- Secondary armament: FN M1918 Browning Automatic Rifle
- Engine: Meadows 5/6 cylinder gasoline engine 55 hp (41 kW); 88 hp (66 kW)
- Power/weight: 17.32 hp per ton
- Transmission: 5 speed
- Suspension: Horstmann suspension
- Operational range: 400 km (250 mi)
- Maximum speed: 56 km/h (35 mph); 70 km/h (43 mph) absolute maximum

The T-13 was a tank destroyer in use with the Belgian armed forces before World War II and during the Battle of Belgium. It was designed by Vickers-Armstrong, and produced by Vickers, Miesse and Familleheureux and outfitted with armament from Fonderie royale de canons Herstal. The earlier T-13s were based on imported Vickers tracked vehicles that were outfitted with armament and armor in Belgium by the Miesse company; later versions, from the B3 version on, were fully license-produced in Belgium by the Familleheureux factory. Total production numbers are unclear and have been underestimated for political reasons, both before and after World War II, but are generally estimated at 300 vehicles, although not all were available or fully outfitted on 10 May 1940, the start of the Battle of Belgium. Nazi Germany used the vehicles after the occupation of Belgium, but to what extent remains unclear.

== History ==
In general - keeping a close watch on German political and military developments - the need for armored tracked vehicles or tanks was widely accepted by the Belgian military establishment. The political view on the matter however was slightly more complex. Bearing in mind how the country had been a battlefield and occupied by Germany during the First World War, the Belgian government tried to keep Belgium a neutral country from 1936 onwards and therefore out of any European conflict. Politicians from the right wing political parties wanted Belgium to abstain from buying offensive weapons such as tanks and bombers, so as not to provoke Germany into starting a new war; politicians from left wing parties rejected such armament on an ideological basis.

From this point of view the T-13 tank destroyer could be described as the result of Belgium's neutrality doctrine: the vehicle had to be light, and therefore lightly armored, and was built without a fully enclosed fighting compartment, much like the German Panzerjäger designs, thus resulting in a tank destroyer class vehicle, rather than a true tank. Also, as with the T-15 light tank units, the descriptive words "tank" or "armored/mechanized unit" were never to be used in official unit designations, with the euphemisms "armored/tracked motorcar" and the historical "cavalry" being favored.

== Vickers Carden Loyd 1934 artillery tractor ==
Since the Belgian armed forces realized the need for further mechanization of the army in the 1930s, a number of foreign platforms were looked at. In 1934, the Belgian Army signed a contract for 21 or 23 Vickers Carden Loyd 1934 artillery tractors with the British firm Vickers. These were meant as artillery tractors for the Chasseurs Ardennais mountain troops, to tow the recently acquired Bofors 75 mm Model 1934 mountain gun. Impressed with the vehicle's performance on both hilly and flat terrain, the Belgian Armed Forces decided to take the concept a little further and experimentally outfitted the tractor with the F.R.C. built 47 mm anti-tank gun, much along the lines of the earlier but ultimately unsuccessful SA F.R.C. 47mm experiment. Not much is known about the basic model Vickers 1934 artillery tractor, apart from the fact that the Belgian Army seems to have been the sole user of the type. In its basic configuration, the Vickers 1934 artillery tractor was unarmored and could generally be described as an open, tracked light truck. It was outfitted with a 51 hp 5 cylinder 3.3 litre Meadows gasoline engine and had an empty weight of 2 tons. Apart from the Chasseurs Ardennais, no other Belgian armed units were outfitted with the type, the Belgian armed forces instead preferring the smaller and far less expensive Vickers/Familleureux utility tractor as their main tracked transporter later on. However, given its successful use with the Chasseurs Ardennais mountain troops, the Belgian Armed Forces decided to order another 32 vehicles, which became the basis for the T-13 B1.

== T-13 B1/B2 design ==
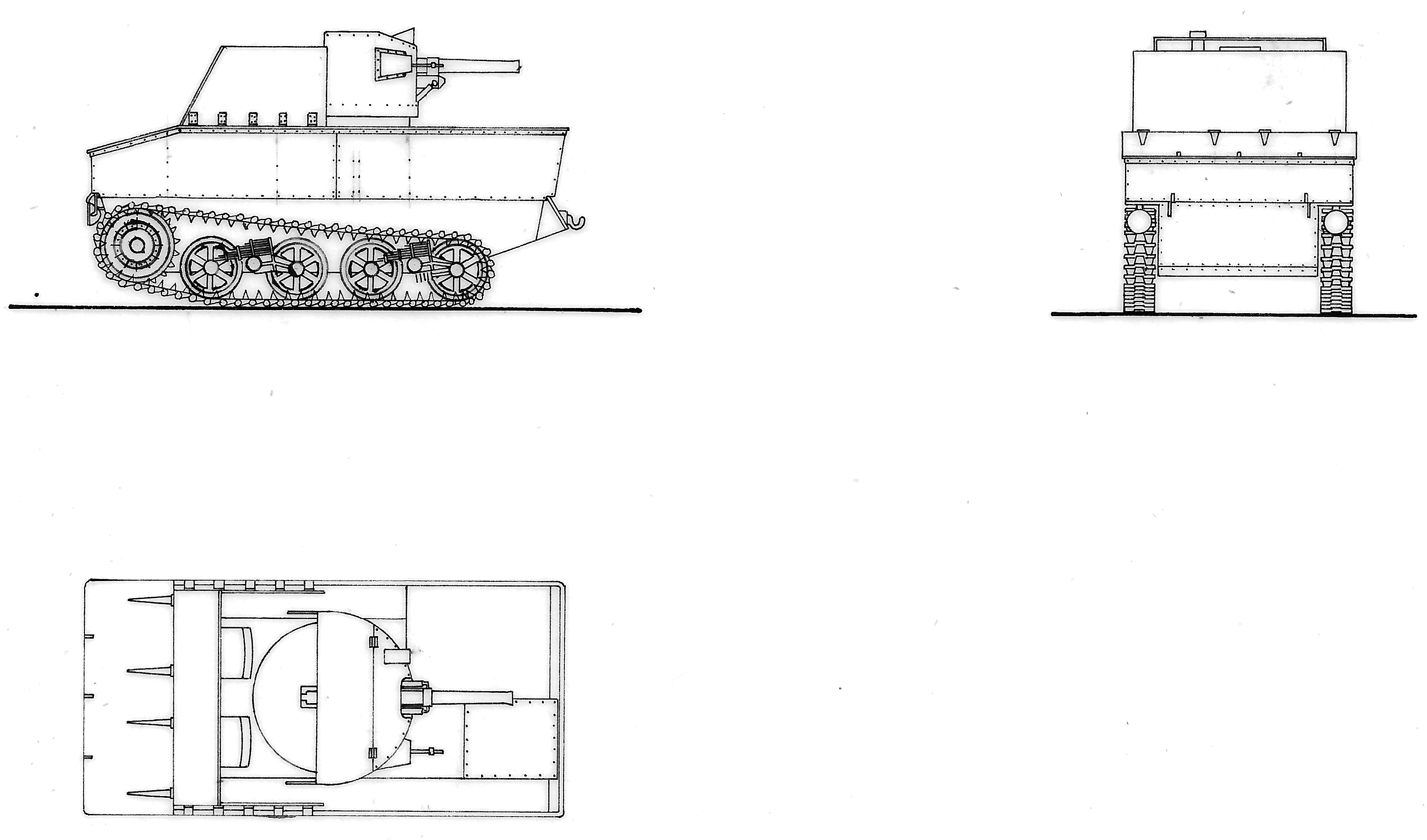
T-13 B1.

Pleased with the performance of the Vickers 1934 artillery truck, the Belgian Army started to equip the 32 new vehicles with the FRC Herstal built 47 mm Model 1931 anti-tank gun. Since this was a fairly heavy piece of equipment, and because of the general lay-out of the Vickers artillery tractor, the decision was taken to simply install the gun and its turret backwards on the vehicle, so as to keep enough space for crew and ammunition. (Note: See picture of T-13 B1 for visual reference)

The general layout of the vehicle mimicked that of the Vickers vehicle it was based on. The suspension was Horstmann suspension resting on bogies with two rubber-lined wheel sets per bogie. This design, exclusively used on lightweight vehicles, was also used on the Light Tank Mk VI of the British Army. Apart from being relatively easy to build, compact and lightweight, it had the advantage of having a long travel, and of being easy to replace when damaged in the field. The drive sprocket was in the front, but there were no idlers or return rollers. Motive power was a Meadows 5-cylinder gasoline engine, producing 51 hp (38 kW), coupled to a five speed preselector gearbox. Steering was a combination of declutching the drive to one track and braking to increase the turn. The traverse of the turret was manual by the three man crew. The T-13s were not equipped with a radio.

Armor protection was limited, but still better than that of the under-armored T-15 light tank. The frontal bulkhead and front of turret were both 12 mm (0.47 in) of hardened steel. Side armor on the vehicle and turret was restricted to 6 mm (0.24 in) of steel, to minimize the weight, costs and political impact of the vehicle. This meant that the T-13 crew was only fully protected against indirect blast and splinter damage, adequately protected against small arms fire from the frontal aspect but not from the sides, and most importantly was not protected at all against most light anti-tank rounds, such as the .50 BMG, the 0.55 inch Boys anti-tank rifle or the German 13.2 mm TuF. Also, the side armor shields had to be folded down to permit the full 360° traverse of the turret, further exposing the crew to enemy rifle fire. If the (lightly) armored side shields were left upwards, traverse of the turret was limited to 120° to the front.

Armament was fairly heavy for this lightweight vehicle, giving the T-13 tank destroyer a good anti-tank capability. The 47 mm Model 1931 anti-tank gun fired 1.52 kg (3 lb 6 oz) armor-piercing shells and could penetrate 47 mm of armor plating from a distance of 300 m, for its time an impressive performance. The maximum firing range of the gun was 2,000 m (2,200 yd), and, as both armor-piercing and high-explosive rounds were available, the gun had a useful anti-infantry capability as well. The secondary armament consisted of a single turret-mounted, FN-built M1918 Browning Automatic Rifle, in 7.65x53mm "Belgian Mauser" calibre instead of the American .30. This light machine gun could fire 500–650 rounds per minute.

=== Production ===
After the prototype T-13 B1 passed all the tests of the Belgian Army, production was authorized to proceed in 1935: the Miesse company near Buizingen (close to Brussels) delivered 32 T-13 B1s, all based on imported British built Vickers 1934 artillery tractors. The T-13 B2 model was a further development of the B1, but differs only slightly from the B1 model: most importantly the turret was redesigned to give the vehicle a somewhat lower frontal silhouette. All 21 (23 according to some sources) T-13 B2s were apparently converted from the earlier Vickers artillery tractors of the Chasseurs Ardennais mountain troops, tracked transport of the M34 75mm Bofors mountain gun now passed on to the smaller but more economical Vickers/Familleureux utility tractor. B2 assembly ended by 1937.

== T-13 B3 design ==
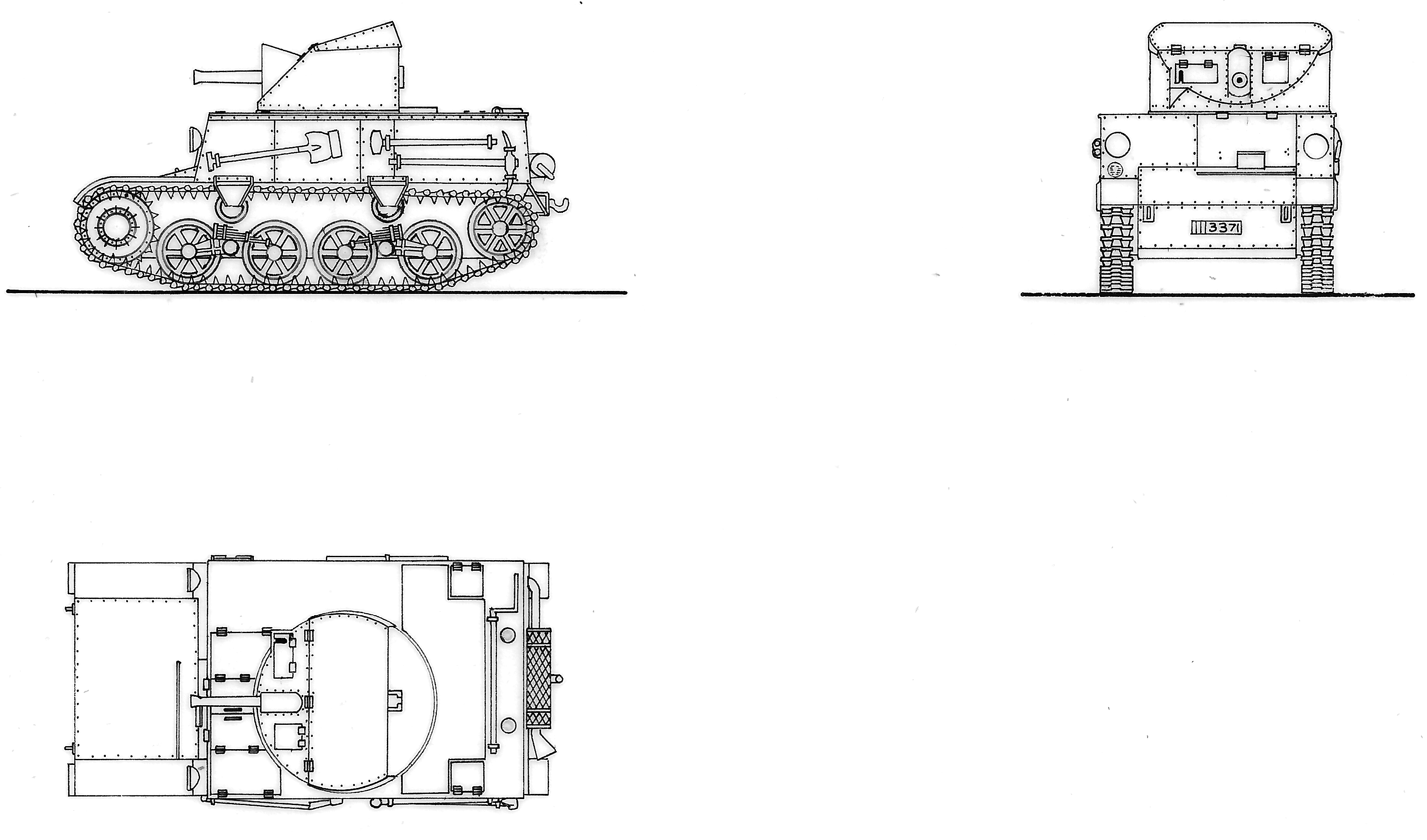
T-13 B3.

Although the Belgian armed forces were generally very pleased with the capabilities of the existing T-13 B1 and B2s, there were obvious issues with both models of the tank destroyer. Since the original Vickers artillery tractor was not designed to carry a gun, it was faced with a common vehicle design problem called 'weight creep', which in essence is the gradual accumulation of weight every time a new feature or capability is added to the design. This led to the first model T-13s being underpowered, somewhat unstable as a gunnery platform, and prone to mechanical malfunctions because of overloading and wear and tear. Full weight was 4,5 tons for a 51 hp gasoline engine. Much more important however was the vulnerability of the three man crew. Exporting fully assembled designs was too expensive a solution to field a tank destroyer in adequate numbers, especially with the Belgian economy performing rather poorly because of the worldwide Great Depression and the resulting drop in foreign demand for industrial products.

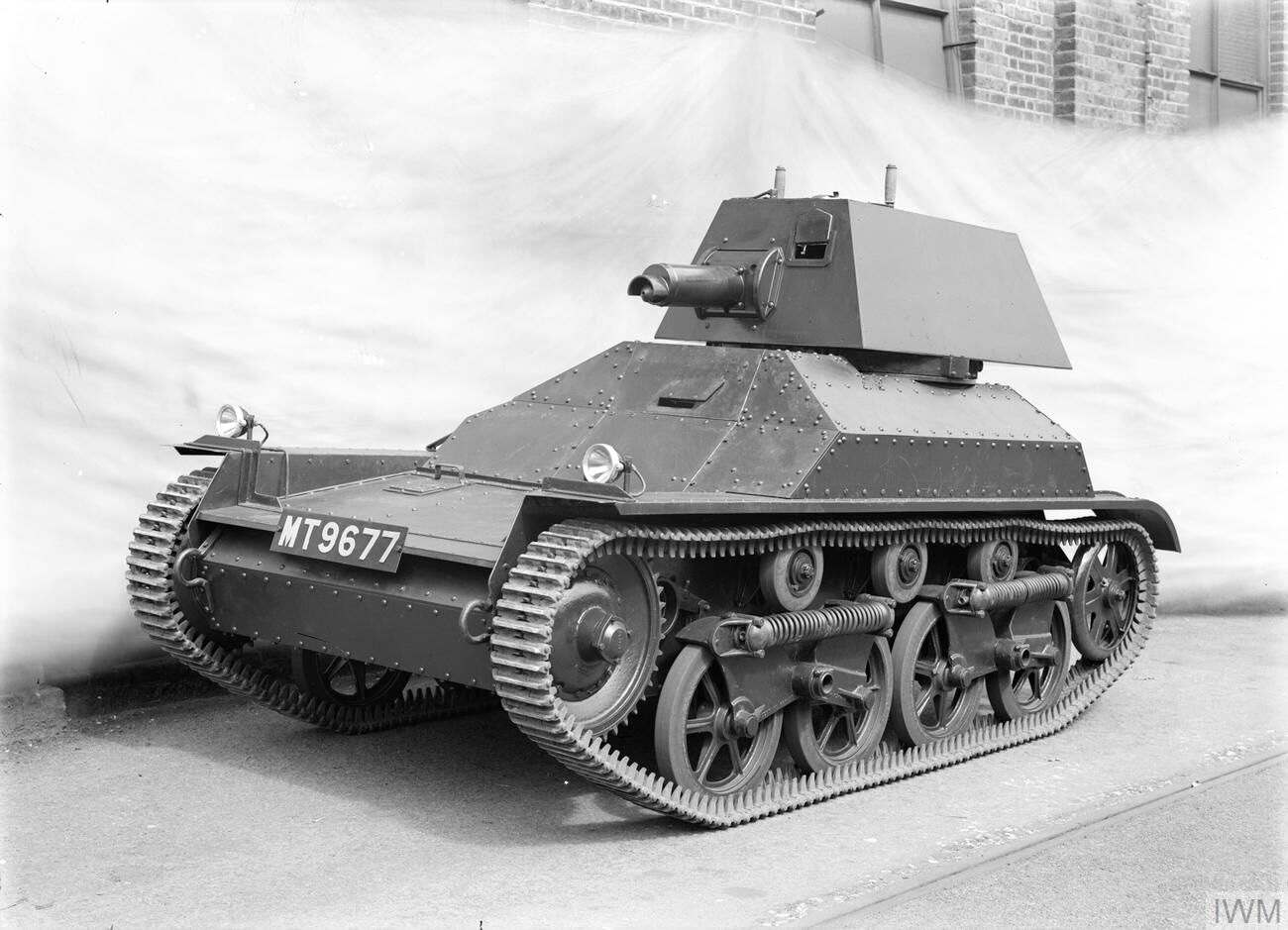
A Vickers-Carden-Loyd Light Tank Mk. II B

In 1936 a new vehicle was imported from Vickers; an export version of the Vickers-Carden-Loyd Light Dragon Mk. IIB artillery tractor, equipped with an 88 hp Meadows 6 cylinder gasoline engine and a "crash" type gearbox. The general design of the vehicle was almost identical to the T-15 Light tank - another Vickers design based on the Light Tank Mk III - already in service with the Belgian armed forces. The suspension was Horstmann suspension resting on bogies with two rubber-lined wheel sets per bogie. The drive sprocket was in the front, the idlers were placed in the rear, with three return rollers. Steering was again a combination of declutching the drive to one track and braking to increase the turn.

The bigger track area, the inclusion of return rollers and the bigger and more powerful engine convinced the Belgian armed forces that this platform would be superior in the tank destroyer role. Also, since the Familleheureux factory, a vehicle and tractor company, was already producing the license built Vickers utility tractor, the decision was taken to buy a license for production at this company instead of directly acquiring all vehicles from the UK. This would allow for a larger and more economical production run compared to the T-13 B1/B2 version.

The definitive T-13 B3 was structurally very different from the earlier B1 and B2 versions, with the B3 suffix chosen to play down the fact that a new tank destroyer was being produced rather than a variant of the older systems. The chassis of the T-13 B3 was bigger, with, apart from the redesigned turret, a box-on-box like appearance. The gun was no longer pointed rearwards as in the first two versions. Armor was only slightly upgraded to 13 mm armored steel on the frontal surfaces and 7 mm steel on the sides, still insufficient to cope with anything but small arms fire and blast and shrapnel damage. However, the chassis was big enough to accommodate the four man crew without the need for the side armor panels, which also allowed the gun to traverse 360° without lowering the (still very low) level of armor protection for the crew in the process of gun laying. The rear remained open, since the vehicle was still meant to be a light tank destroyer.

The most important and obvious difference was the bigger and more powerful engine, which allowed for greatly reduced wear and tear and a rather more stable gun laying platform, and above all for better manoeuvrability in the field. Top speed for the T-13 B3 was increased to 56 km per hour or even 65–70 km per hour, a speed reached by commander A. Modera in 1940. The armament, apart from lay out and sighting systems, was left untouched, although more ammunition could be carried. Range was increased: from 240 km for the B1-B2 versions to 400 km for the B3 version. Total weight became 5.08 tons.

=== Production ===
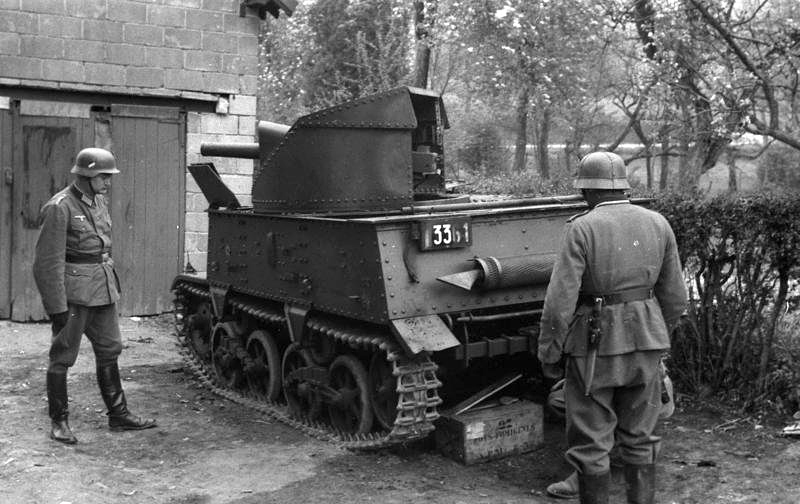
Two German soldiers looking at a captured T13 B3

The Familleheureux company set up production after acquiring a Vickers licence in 1936 and delivery of the first production T 13 B3s commenced in 1938. After the Second World War broke out in September 1939, production was stepped up so as to equip as many army units as possible. The Belgian army was finally satisfied with the B3 variant tank destroyer and kept on ordering. Production of the B3 ended at the start of the Battle of Belgium, after 250 to 255 units had been produced at Familleheureux. Combined with the earlier B1 and B2 production, this was, in theory, a total of 303 to 311 T-13 vehicles. However, a few dozen of these T-13s were still being outfittted at the factory when war broke out. About two dozen others were on en route to new units, but since there was no more time for training units in their use they were used as reserves for units already equipped with the T-13 or as sources for spare parts. Only about 220 T-13s of all variants were actually fielded with operational units. This made the T-13 the most numerous armored tracked vehicle in the Belgian armed forces inventory.

== Deployment and operational history ==
A total of 16-18 T-13 companies with 12 vehicles each were fielded, together with a number of single vehicles and squads. These T-13 companies were mostly added to some of the existing infantry divisions: the 1st, 2nd, 3rd, 4th, 7th, 8th, 9th, 10th, 11th and 18th infantry division all had a single T-13 company on 10 May 1940. Only the 'Chasseurs Ardennais' 1st mountain division and the two cavalry divisions had two or three companies each. Together with the 42 T-15 light tanks both Belgian cavalry divisions had about 50 armored tracked vehicles each, with the infantry mostly transported on motorcycles, and heavy weapons on trucks and a number of lightly armored wheeled vehicles. Operationally, the Belgian armed forces, apart from the cavalry units, followed the rather ineffective World War I "penny packet" doctrine, also used in the French army at the time. Instead of using the armored units independently to profit maximally from their speed and mobility, the units were diluted and used to "stiffen" the infantry units: this led to an adaptation of an inflexible and linear way of defense, greatly reducing their speed, mobility and overall, their effectiveness. This also led to a psychological command problem, since infantry commanders were not keen on risking the few armored units they had at hand.

At war, the T-13 was still prone to malfunctions and breakdowns, especially the elderly and underpowered B1 and B2 versions, although the hastily delivered T-13 B3 equipped units - which in some cases had been training on their new equipment for only a few days - had problems as well. For example, the 8th company of the 2nd regiment 'Grenswielrijders/Cyclistes-Frontière' already had a broken down T-13 on the very first day of the Battle of Belgium, and had only four out of 12 left after eight days of fighting: although some of these were knocked out in battle, at least half of them were lost due to mechanical breakdowns or to Luftwaffe bombing raids. The open topped T-13s were very vulnerable targets in an air attack, and the overwhelming air superiority of the Luftwaffe during the war in western Europe led to high losses. The vehicle was almost as vulnerable to artillery or even light mortar fire.

The lack of a radio was another very important issue that often led to immobilized units, waiting for a single motorcyclist to act as a liaison. Very often armored units were only a few kilometers away from the fighting but were not aware of this fact or not allowed to proceed without orders. However, this was true for most western armored units during the battle for western Europe: indeed only the German Panzer groups were adequately equipped and had a good enough understanding of how important wireless communications were to be in a mobile battle. Most importantly however, the T-13s, very similar to British Light Tank Mk VI and French Renault R35 and Renault FT light tanks, proved to be underarmored. Therefore, in spite of the big gun, they lacked the capability to act as a true mobile counter-armor weapon. Very often, when T-13s, T-15s and even the heavier Renault AMC 35s of the Belgian army tried to counterattack, the German 37 mm Pak anti-tank guns and similarly equipped armored units inflicted heavy casualties - neither the T-13 nor the T-15 had been designed for this mission.

On the other hand, the 47 mm gun proved to be very valuable, and was effective against both light and heavy armored enemy units. On 10 May 1940, after it had crossed the small country of Luxembourg at night without encountering much resistance, the reconnaissance group of the German 1st Panzer division got pinned down by a single T-13 of the 4th company of the first mountain division 'Chasseurs Ardennais' at the border town of Martelange, a couple of armored vehicles getting knocked out in the process. On a different occasion, in the afternoon of 12 May 1940 the 3rd regiment 'Lansiers/Lanciers' of the Cavalry knocked out a German reconnaissance group that was advancing on the road between the towns of Zoutleeuw and Drieslinter, and succeeded in wiping it out completely, finishing off the remaining infantry with machine gun fire. On one occasion, a single 47 mm hit pierced the hull of a Panzer IV on both sides of the vehicle, continuing its trajectory afterwards.

Also, with four crew members assigned to each T-13 B3 (B1 and B2 versions had a crew of three), workload was well divided and when adequately trained, most T-13 equipped units were able to make good use of their tank destroyer. Confronted with soft targets, the T-13s fared well: T-13s participated in the successful counterattack at Kwatrecht near Gent on 20 May 1940, which succeeded in throwing back the German Army's 192nd and 234th infantry regiments, until British troops to the south of Oudenaarde received the order to retreat to Dunkirk on 22 May 1940 and broke contact with the Belgian front one day later.

== German use ==
T-13 B3 in service with Waffen-SS unit

After the Battle of Belgium ended in German occupation on 28 May 1940, the Wehrmacht took over all usable T-13 vehicles that had not been sabotaged by their crews. They were hastily marked with Balken crosses to distinguish them from enemy units. Apparently, some of these participated in the war with the remaining French army, although it is unclear how many of the T-13s got used in this way. The German designation for this vehicle was "Panzerjäger VA 802(b)". Most of these vehicles however had very likely never left Belgium, apart from being used for scrap metal later in the war. They were mostly assigned to driver training and target practice, light support duties, airfield security, counter insurgency and possibly as part of the Atlantikwall coastal defenses. However, apart from some photographic evidence, very little is known about the German use of the T-13.

== Survivors ==
A single known surviving T-13 B2 exists at the Brussels Royal Museum of the Armed Forces and Military History.

== See also ==
- Belgian combat vehicles of World War II
