= Vickers T-15 light tank =

Char Léger de Reconnaissance Vickers-Carden-Loyd Mod.1934 T.15
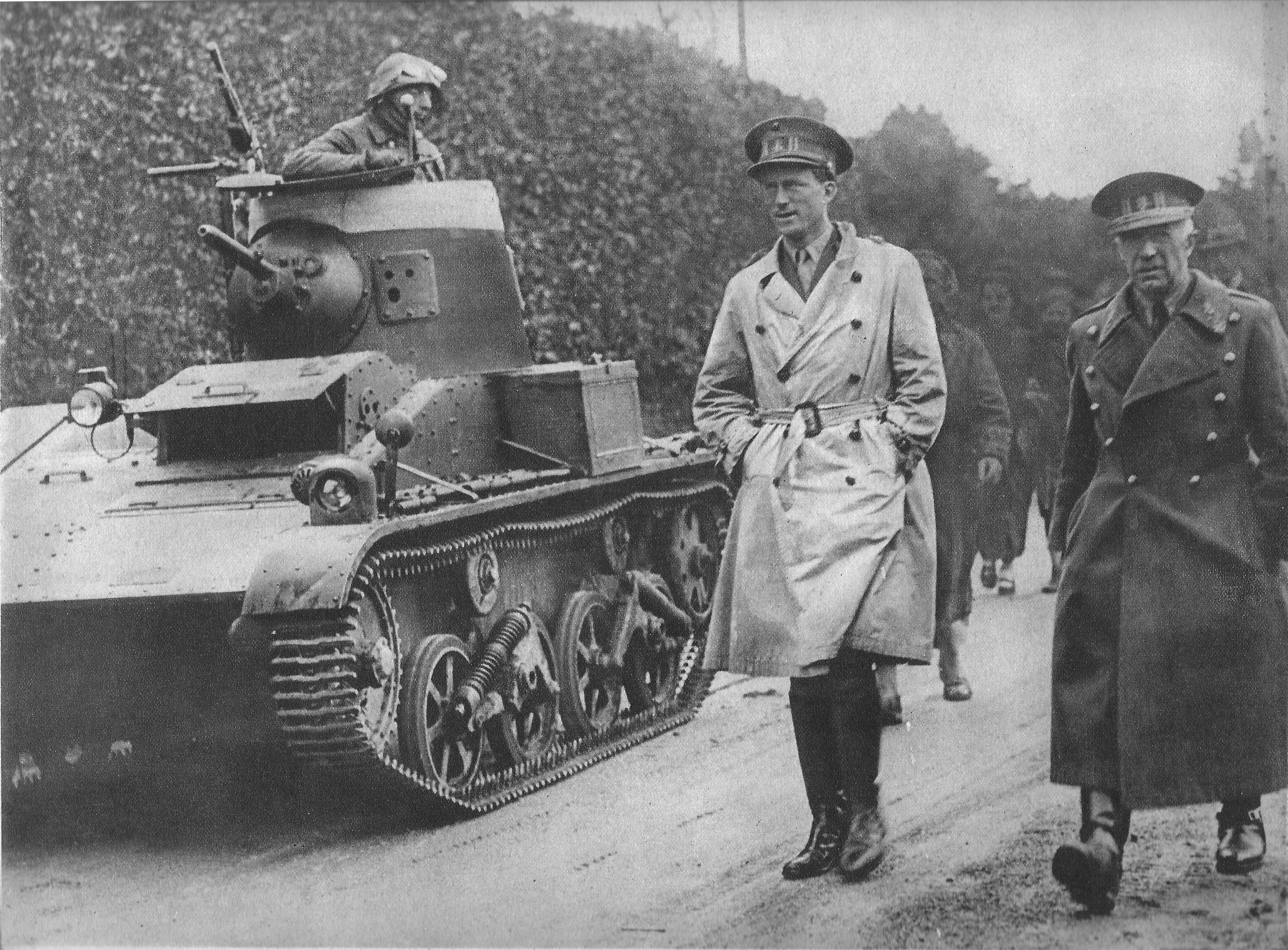
- King Leopold III reviews a T-15 light tank of the Belgian army, in 1940
- Type: Light tank
- Place of origin: United Kingdom

Service history
- In service: 1936–1945?
- Used by: Belgium, Nazi Germany
- Wars: Second World War

Production history
- Designer: Vickers and F.R.C.
- Designed: 1934
- Manufacturer: Vickers and F.R.C.
- Produced: 1935–1938
- No. built: 42

Specifications
- Mass: 3.8 ton
- Length: 3.63 m (11 ft 11 in)
- Width: 1.89 m (6 ft 2 in)
- Height: 1.90 m (6 ft 3 in)
- Crew: 2 : commander/gunner & driver
- Armor: 7–9 mm (0.28–0.35 in)
- Main armament: 13.2 mm (0.52 in) Hotchkiss M1929 machine gun
- Secondary armament: 7.65 mm Fusil-Mitrailleur FN.-Browning Model 1930
- Engine: Meadows 6-cylinder gasoline engine 88 hp (66 kW)
- Power/weight: 23.16 hp per ton
- Transmission: 4 speed
- Suspension: Horstmann coil spring
- Operational range: 230 km (140 mi)
- Maximum speed: 64 km/h (40 mph)

The Vickers T-15 light tank, full designation Char Léger de Reconnaissance Vickers-Carden-Loyd Mod.1934 T.15, was a light 4-ton tank of the Belgian Army. They were built by Vickers-Armstrong in the UK to the design of their Light Tank Mark III and outfitted with their armament in Belgium by Fonderie Royale de Canons (FRC) at Herstal. It entered service in 1935, and was used by the Belgian Army during the Battle of Belgium in May 1940. Its main armament was a 13.2 mm Hotchkiss machine gun. The tank was intended as a replacement for the venerable but obsolescent Renault FT. Only 42 were produced.

== History ==
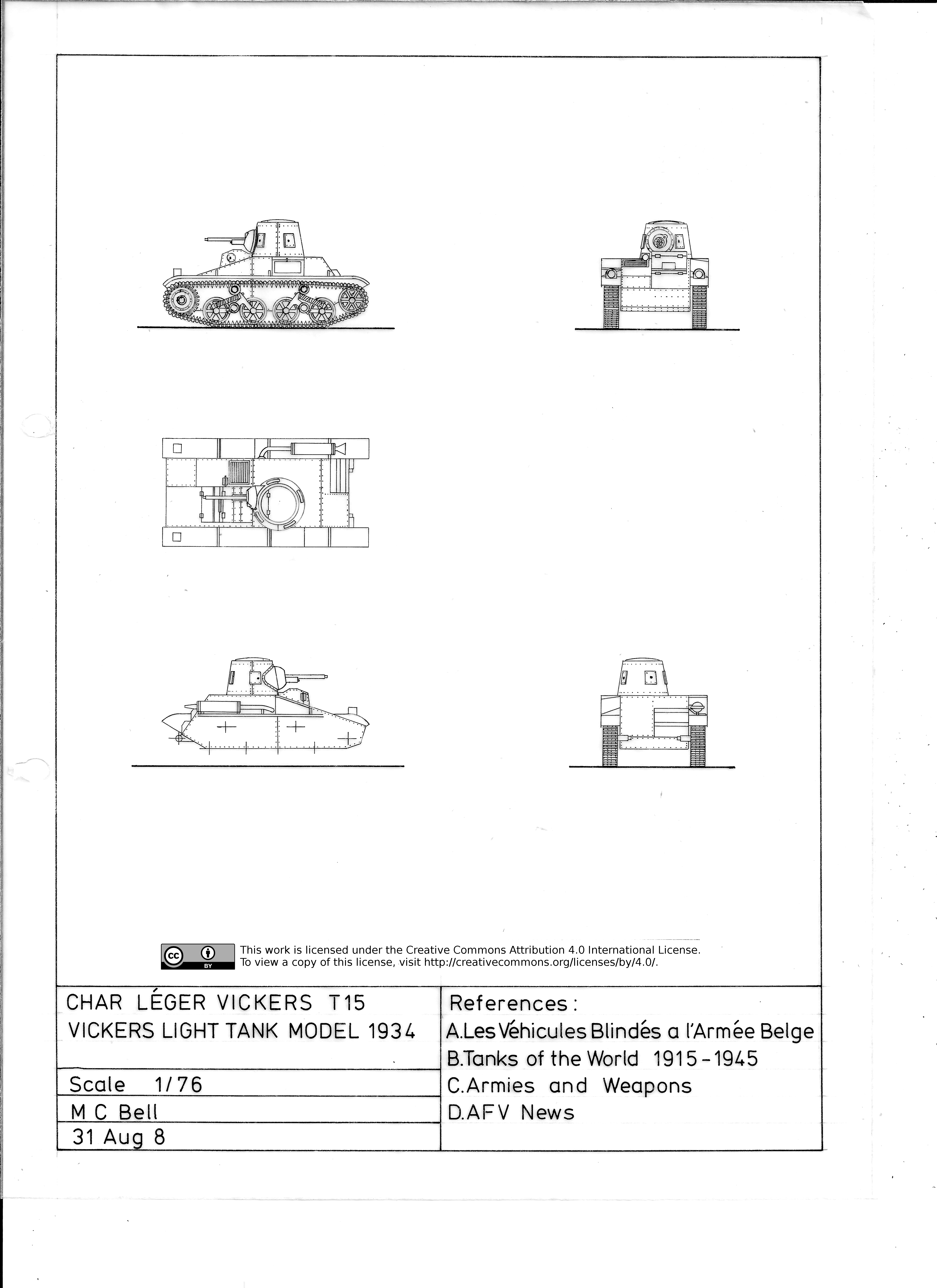
Profile of the Vickers T-15

Since the First World War, the Belgian army had been using the French-designed Renault FT tanks, armed with either a machinegun or a small Puteaux SA 18 low velocity anti-infantry gun. It was still in use with the Belgian cavalry regiments but was growing clearly obsolete by the early 1930s, so in 1933 it was decided that the remaining 75 FTs were to be replaced by a new light tank. This would turn out to be the T-15 light tank. Looking at tank designs from both France and the UK (Belgium's allies during the First World War), the Belgian army already had some experience with Vickers - Carden Loyd vehicles (SA F.R.C. 47mm) and was interested in other designs from the firm. French tank production and development were also considered.

Apart from the light tank with a machine gun, a medium type with a cannon was desired, leading to the rather trying acquisition of the Renault AMC 35 in 1935. The AMC 35 was, in its earlier AMC 34 version, favoured to the well-known Vickers 6-ton light tank. Since experience with the Polish armed forces' Vickers showed that the air-cooled 80 hp engine tended to overheat, the Belgian army requested a Vickers prototype equipped with a water-cooled Rolls-Royce engine, which would not fit in the back and therefore was installed sideways in the modified 6-ton tank. This version received the designation 'Mark F'. Although the new layout of the tank was used by Vickers on other export vehicles, the Belgian army placed no orders, the AMC 35 being considered superior in armament and armour protection.

The Belgian government showed unease about buying 'tanks', which were considered to be 'offensive' weapons: Germany was not to be provoked, and the official Belgian diplomatic stance on the European conflict was to remain neutral. The word 'tank' or 'armored/mechanized unit' were never to be used in official unit designations, with the words 'armored/tracked motorcar' and the historical 'cavalry' being favored, as shown by the original designation of Auto-Blindée/Mitrailleuse T.15.

Eventually, another product from the Vickers catalogue was chosen: the Vickers-Carden-Loyd M1934 export version of the 4-ton Light Tank Mk III. The Belgian armed forces were generally in favor of the layout of the prototype Mk III, when changed into the Vickers Carden Loyd Light Tank Model 1935, but asked Vickers for a different, conical rivetted one-man turret, with a cast gun mantle. The armament proposed by Vickers, the .303 inch (7.7 mm) or .50 inch (12.7 mm) Vickers machine guns, were both rejected, the heavier French 13.2 mm Hotchkiss machine gun being favored instead. F.R.C. had to integrate this weapon into the new turret. In the late thirties it also built the air defence type turret mount for the FN Herstal Browning 7.65mm FM Mod30. The extra air defence machine gun was gradually installed on the turret roofs of the T-15s.

Given the strained government defence budget in the early 1930s, due to the effects of the Great Depression, the acquisition had to be split up in batches: the first 18 units were ordered on 10 March 1934, and delivered in two lots of nine on 15 and 22 February 1935. The second batch of 24 units was ordered on 16 April 1935 and they were delivered between 15 November – 28 December 1935.

Due to delays in the delivery of the AMC 35, the Belgian army later considered buying eighty-three vehicles of the Vickers Carden Loyd Light Tank Model 1937. This type resembled the T.15 in the hull but was to be equipped with a larger turret able to hold a 40 mm or 47 mm gun. No production ensued. Even later, a prototype was ordered of the Vickers Command Tank which was tested in 1939.

== Design ==
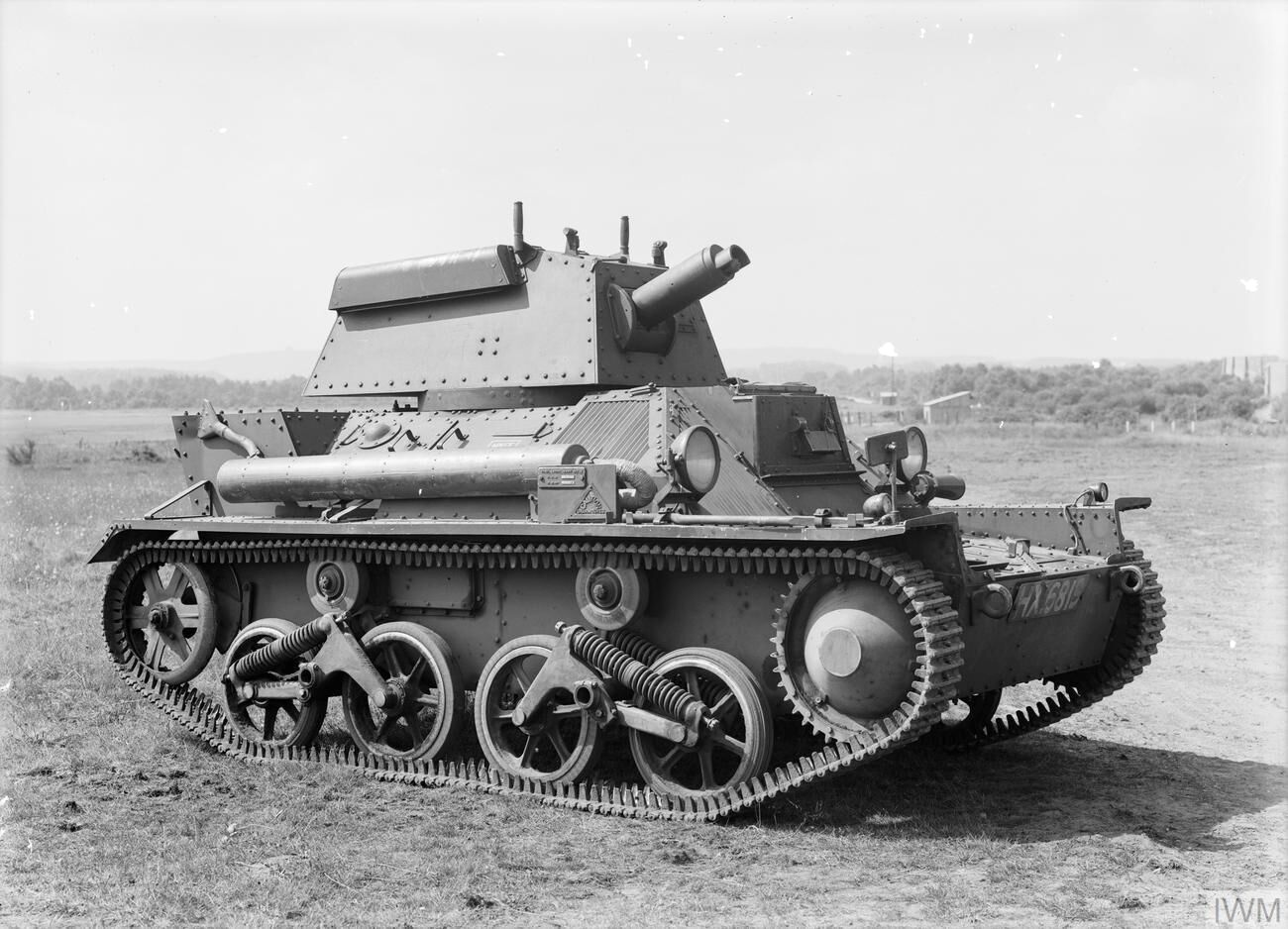
The prototype Mk III Vickers Light 5-ton tank the T-15 was based on

The design of the T-15 obviously was similar to that of the Mark III light tank prototype. The suspension was made out of Horstmann coil spring resting on bogies with two rubber-lined wheel sets per bogie. This design, invented by Sidney Horstmann and exclusively used on lightweight vehicles, was also used up to the Light Tank Mk VI of the British Army. Apart from being relatively easy to build, compact and lightweight, it had the advantage of having a long travel, and of being easy to replace when damaged in the field. The drive sprocket was in the front, the idler-wheels were placed in the rear, with two return rollers. Power came from a Henry Meadows 6-cylinder gasoline engine, producing 88 hp (66 kW), coupled with a four speed preselector gearbox. Steering was a combination of declutching the drive to one track and braking to increase the turn. The traverse of the turret was electrically actuated. The T-15s were not equipped with a radio.

The armor of the Belgian T-15 version was considerably less than that on the original Mark III design: instead of 12–14 mm of armor steel, only 7–9 mm were used. This meant that the T-15 crew was only fully protected against indirect blast and splinter damage, and reasonably well protected against small arms fire (except at point-blank range perpendicular to the armour), but was not protected at all against most light anti-tank rounds, such as the .50 BMG, the 0.55 in Boys anti-tank rifle, the German 13.2 mm TuF or indeed its own 13.2 mm (0.52 in) Hotchkiss round. Even at European standards of the time the T-15 tank could be considered underarmored. The tradeoff was - apart from a political one - excellent mobility: at an only 3.8 metric tons weight, but powered by an 88 hp (66 kW) engine, the T-15 had a remarkable top speed of 64 km/h (40 mph), well suited to cavalry tactics. It was hoped this would turn the T-15 into a harder target to hit.

The primary armament of the T-15 tank was the 13.2 mm Hotchkiss machine gun, already in use with the Belgian air force as a light anti-aircraft gun. Although intended as an anti-aircraft gun, it had some anti-armor capabilities: it could penetrate 13 mm of armor plate at a range of 500 m (1,640 ft). Barrel length was 992 mm (39.06 in). It fired from 25 or 30 cartridge box magazines at a rate of 450 rounds per minute. This gave the T-15 the theoretical capability to take out most enemy armored cars, half-tracks and soft-skinned vehicles. Apart from the machinegun-armed Panzer I however, the T-15 armament was no match for the heavier German tanks, nor was it meant to be. The secondary armament consisted of a single pintle-mounted light M1918 Browning Automatic Rifle (BAR), meant as a form of anti-aircraft defence. To fire the BAR the gunner had to be exposed to enemy fire.

== Deployment and operational history ==
Judging by the fact that no more than 42 T-15's were fielded altogether, as opposed to the more numerous T-13 tank destroyers, and by the fact that the delivery program ended already in the 1936–38 timeframe, well before the start of the Second World War and the Battle of Belgium, the Belgian army clearly became less enthralled by the T-15. Only the elite Chasseurs Ardennais mountain troops and the cavalry regiments fielded the T-15 operationally. Deployment was as follows: 16 T-15's each for the two cavalry divisions (combined with T-13 tank destroyers and other tracked and wheeled armored vehicles), three each in the 1st, 2nd and 3rd Regiments Chasseurs Ardennais - but not in the 4th, 5th and 6th - and one in the driver training school.

From a technical point of view the T-15 showed shortcomings: apart from being hardly fit to deal with opposing armored units because of its versatile but light armament and from being rather underarmored, stability problems when on the move made gun-laying difficult and slow: the suspension was too soft which led to excessive forward pitching when braking. This made the high speed of the T-15's a lot less important and effective. Technical and reliability problems were not uncommon either: since the Vickers light tank Mark III was not adopted by any other customer, finetuning and overcoming theething problems was to be done by the Belgian armed forces. At least two T-15's got sent to the repair depot in Brussels during the first four days of the Battle of Belgium, while at least two others had to be left behind due to technical difficulties: one of those had a broken clutch.

On the other hand, the T-15s were also involved in some successful counterattacks. In one of these accounts, the 7th 'eskadron pantserwagens'/'escadron voitures blindés', part of the first cavalry division, 2nd regiment Lancers, equipped with both T-13s and T-15s, battled on 12 May 1940 with six German tanks at the small town of Hannuit. Although the 7th had two of its tanks knocked out, it also succeeded in knocking out two German tanks. Another account tells of the successful but ultimately futile counterattack in the town of Knesselare, the day before the Belgian capitulation. The 1st and 4th 'eskadron cyclisten'/'escadron cyclistes' (motorcycle cavalry) of the 1st regiment 'jagers te paard'/'chasseurs a cheval' tried to retake the town after a German infantry unit equipped with Pak 36s had infiltrated Knesselare from the east. At 15:00 hours, a group of T-13 and T-15 tanks attacked under the command of colonel Morel, and retook the town, taking 150 German soldiers as prisoners of war. However, later in the evening, after being surrounded and attacked by a much more cautiously operating tank group, the Belgian army had to retreat from Knesselare.

After the Battle of Belgium ended, the few surviving T-15s were taken over by the German armed forces under the designation "Panzerspähwagen VCL 701 (b)" (reconnaissance armoured car). Some were immediately put to use as Beutepanzer by German units in the Battle of France, sprayed in a grey colour. Since the number of surviving T-15s was small and because the machines were fully imported with only a limited amount of spare parts available, subsequent German deployment must have been limited to driver training and target practice, light support duties, airfield security or counterinsurgency. Possibly they were made part of the Atlantikwall coastal defences. There are no known surviving vehicles today.

== See also ==
- Belgian armoured fighting vehicles of World War II
