= 4.2-inch mortar =

4.2-inch mortar may refer to:

- ML 4.2-inch mortar – a British heavy mortar also known as SB 4.2 inch
- M2 4.2-inch mortar - a US heavy mortar of WWII and later conflicts
- M30 mortar - US heavy mortar that replaced the M2
