= Light tanks of the United Kingdom =

Tank, Light, Mk I to Mark V
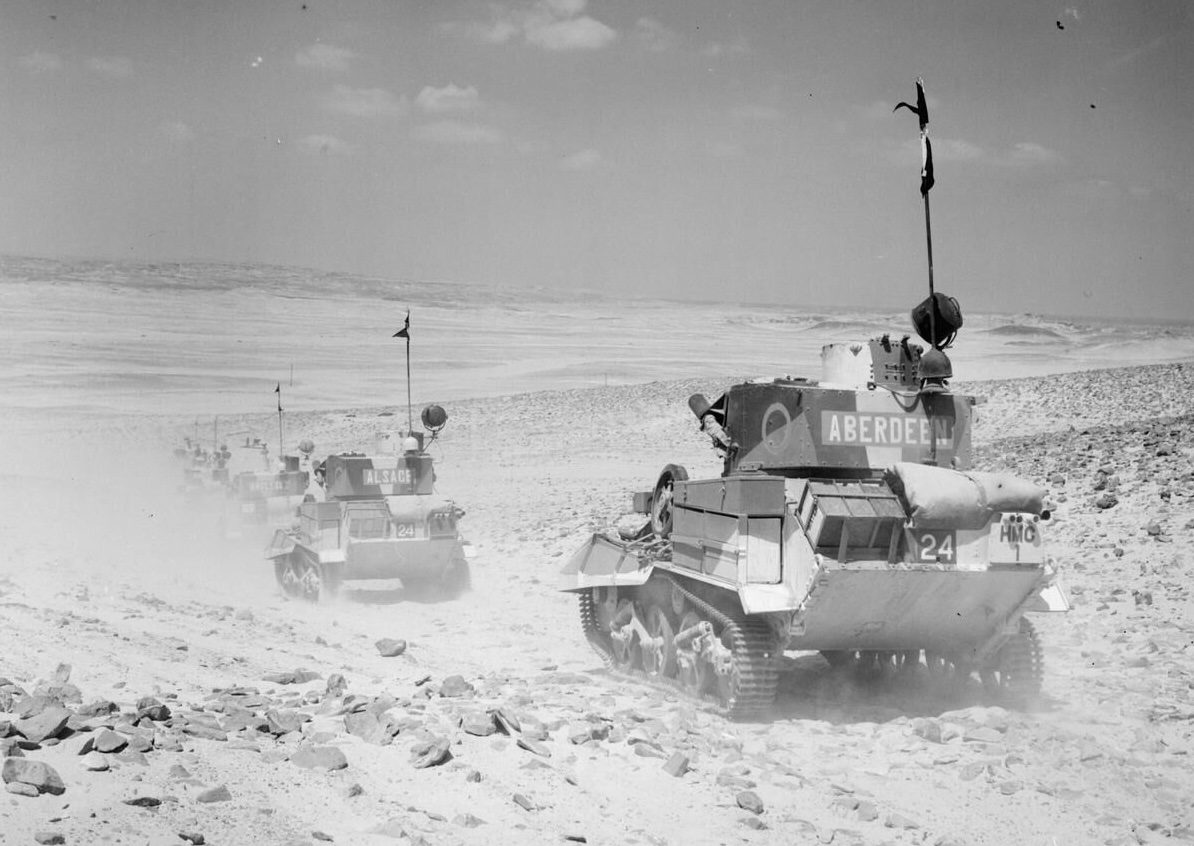
- Vickers light tanks cross the desert, 1940
- Type: Light tank
- Place of origin: United Kingdom

Production history
- Designer: Vickers-Armstrongs
- Manufacturer: Vickers-Armstrongs
- Unit cost: £7,700 (1927, excluding the gun)
- Variants: Mk I, Mk II, Mk III, Mk IV, Mk V

Specifications (Light Tank, Mark V)
- Mass: 4.75 long tons (4.83 t)
- Length: 12 ft 10 in (3.91 m)
- Width: 6 ft 9 in (2.06 m)
- Height: 7 ft 3 in (2.26 m)
- Crew: 2 (Mk I-IV); 3 (Mk V)
- Armour: 12 mm maximum
- Main armament: .50 in Vickers machine gun
- Secondary armament: .303 in Vickers machine gun
- Engine: Meadows 6-cylinder petrol 88 hp
- Suspension: Horstmann inclined springs
- Operational range: 130 mi (210 km)
- Maximum speed: 32.5 mph (52.3 km/h)

The Light Tank Mark I to Mark V were a series of related designs of light tank produced by Vickers for the British Army during the interwar period.

Between the First and Second World Wars, the British produced a series of similar light tanks. They saw use in training, and in limited engagements with British Empire units such as the South African Army during the East African Campaign of 1941. All were around 5 long tons (5.1 t) in weight and capable of 30 mph (48 km/h) on roads and around 20 mph (32 km/h) cross-country.

The British did not expect their light tanks to be used against anything except other light tanks at most and as such armament was a machine gun only—Vickers machine guns firing either a .303 inch or .0.5 inch (12.7 mm) round. Suspension was Horstmann coil spring on bogies. The engine was a Meadows six-cylinder petrol. Up until the Mk V, they were crewed by a driver-commander and gunner. The Mk V had a driver, a gunner and a commander helping on the gun.

The various marks were produced in relatively small numbers. By the Mark V, the design was more or less optimised and it was the final development of in the form of the Light Tank Mk VI which was chosen for the British Army expansion programme in expectation of war.

The following designations in the sequence Light Tank Mk VII "Tetrarch" and Light Tank Mk VIII "Harry Hopkins" were produced by Vickers but unrelated to the series of light tanks Mk I to Mark VI.

== Development ==
=== Tankettes ===
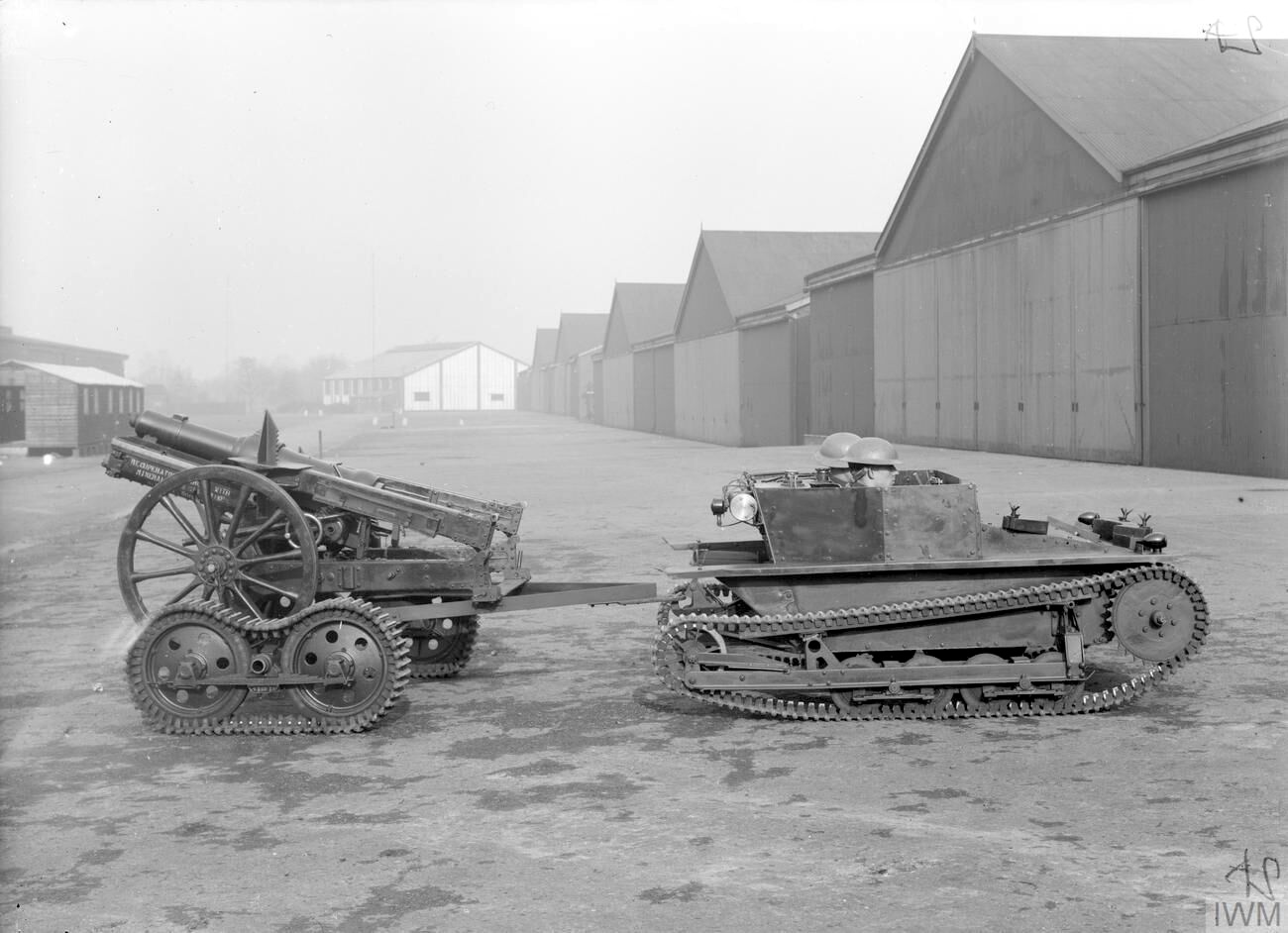
A Carden-Loyd tankette towing a howitzer

Following the activities of the Experimental Mechanized Force in the late 1920s, the British Army identified a need for two light tracked vehicles; one to carry a machine gun for the infantry and one with a turret for the Royal Tank Corps. The Carden-Loyd tankette became the infantry vehicle, at the same time Carden privately developed a number of light, two-man tank designs. The Carden Mark VII design was accepted as a prototype for the army's light tank. By that point Carden-Loyd was part of Vickers-Armstrong. Only a few of the first light tanks were built and, although never issued per se, gave useful information for subsequent developments.

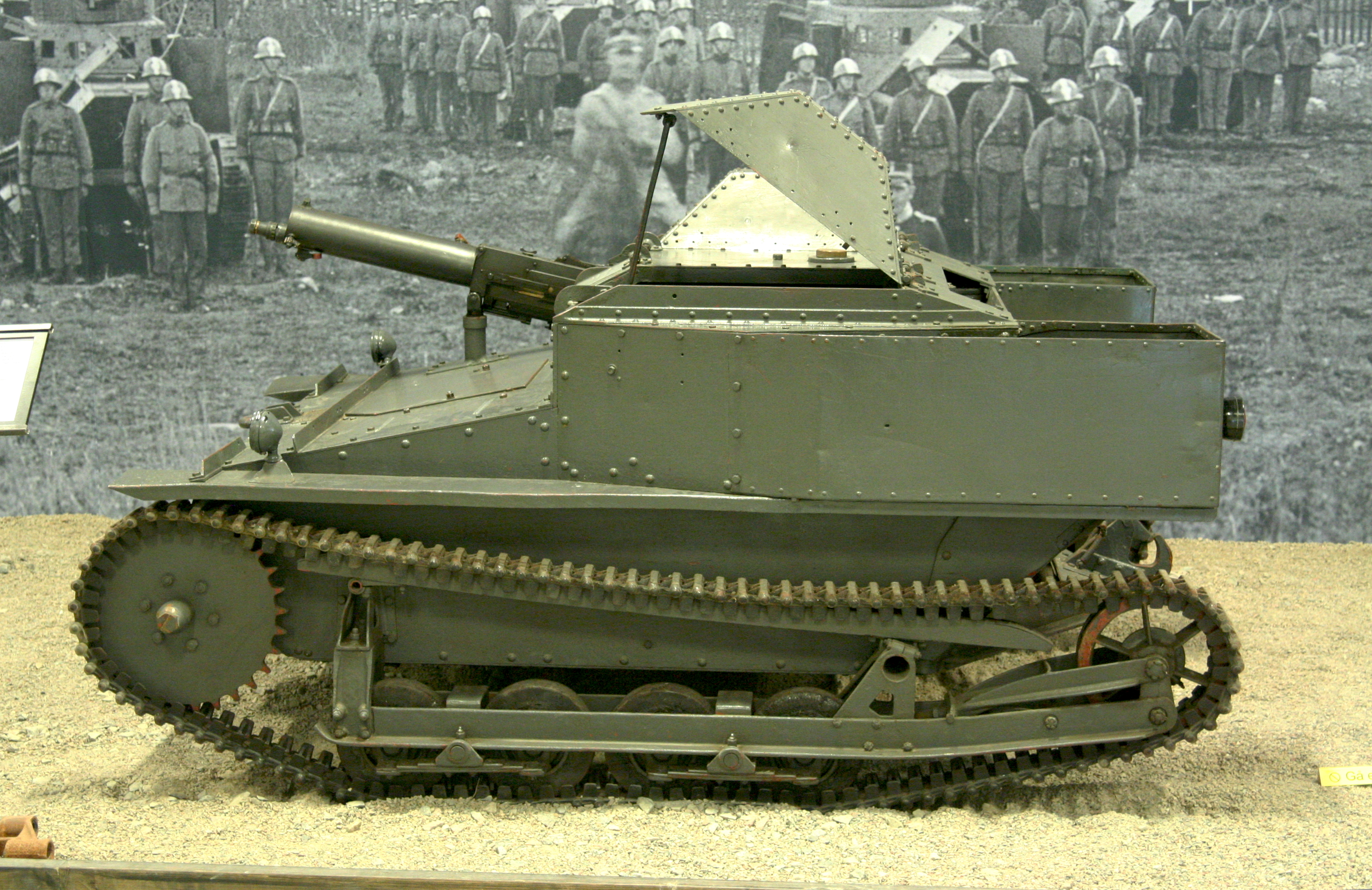
A Carden-Loyd Mk.VI

The Mark VII was a small machine gun-armed vehicle with a 59 hp (44 kW) Meadows engine which gave it a maximum speed of 35 mph (56 km/h). Suspension was two 2-wheel leaf sprung bogies on either side with an external girder to give the suspension strength. Considered a reconnaissance vehicle and a mobile machine gun position, the Mark VI was the final stage of development of the Carden-Loyd series of tankettes. The Carden-Loyd tankette was the prototype for the Universal Carrier.

=== Tank, Light, Mk I ===
The Mark I differed in a few points from Carden's Mark VII tankette. The external suspension girder was dropped by strengthening the suspension at the hull supports. The bevelled turret was replaced by a cylindrical design but still carried a single 0.303 Vickers machine gun. Giving it a 14 mm (0.55 in) "basis" of armour, increased weight and dropped the top speed to 30 mph (48 km/h).

The Meadows engine drove the tracks though a four-speed gearbox to the front drive wheels. Steering was a combination of de-clutching the drive to one track and braking to tighten the turn. The track was tensioned by a rear idler—which, being set at the same height as the drive sprocket, was new in British tank designs—and returned over three rollers.

The Mark IA had a larger superstructure and a larger turret to give room for operating the machine gun. Horstmann suspension with horizontal coil springs replaced the leaf springs of the Mark I. Although it could give an easy ride under moderate conditions, the springs could, under certain circumstances, cause an uncontrollable bounce. The engine was also changed to a Ricardo diesel engine.

The Mark IA tanks sent to India in 1931 for trials received modifications to improve engine cooling in the hotter climate and various means were experimented with to reduce the heat for the crew as well.

- Mk I: four or five made, based on the Carden-Loyd Mk VIII
- Mk IA: nine produced, four of these were sent for trials in India

=== Tank, Light, Mk II ===
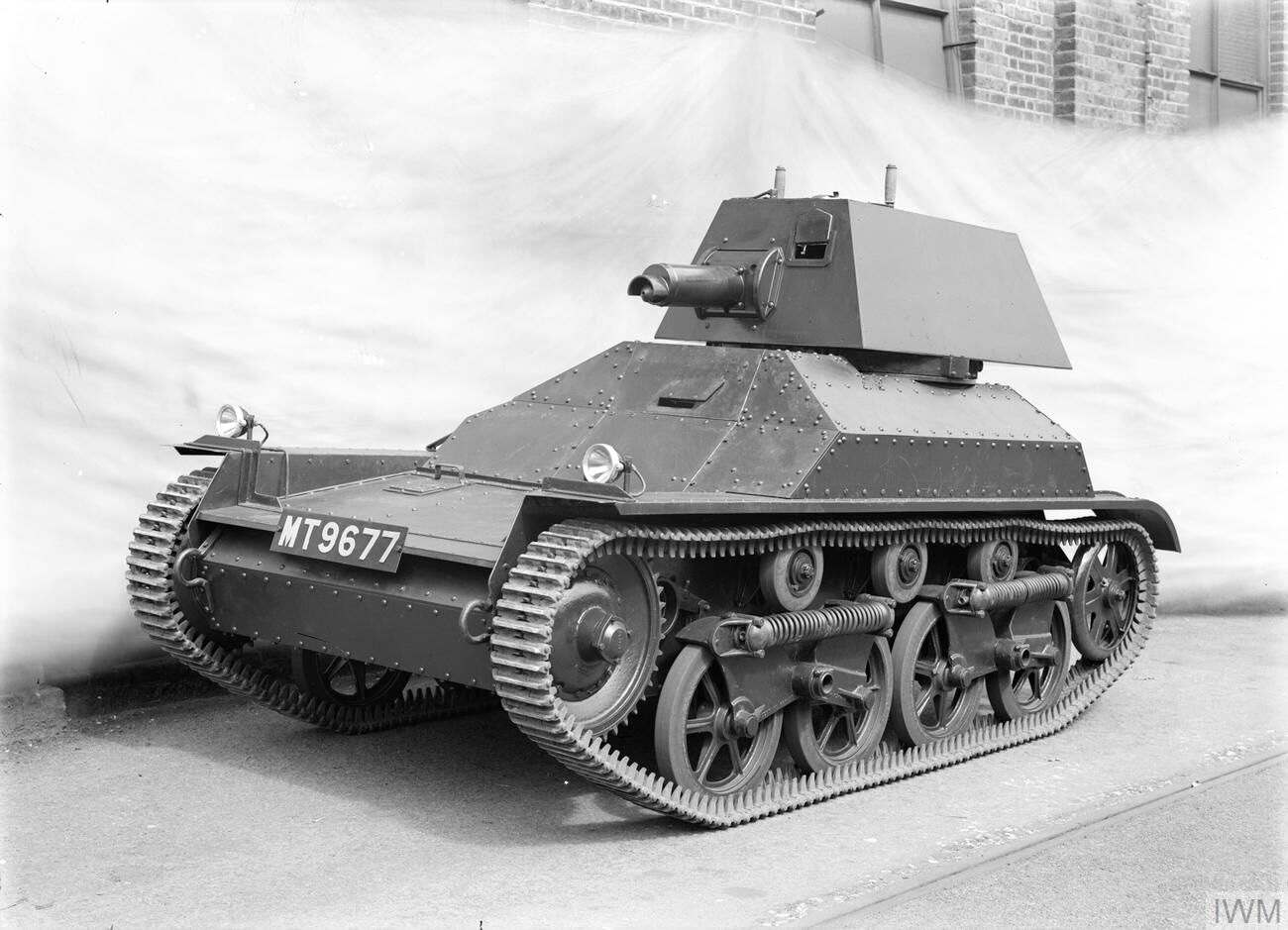
Light Tank Mk II

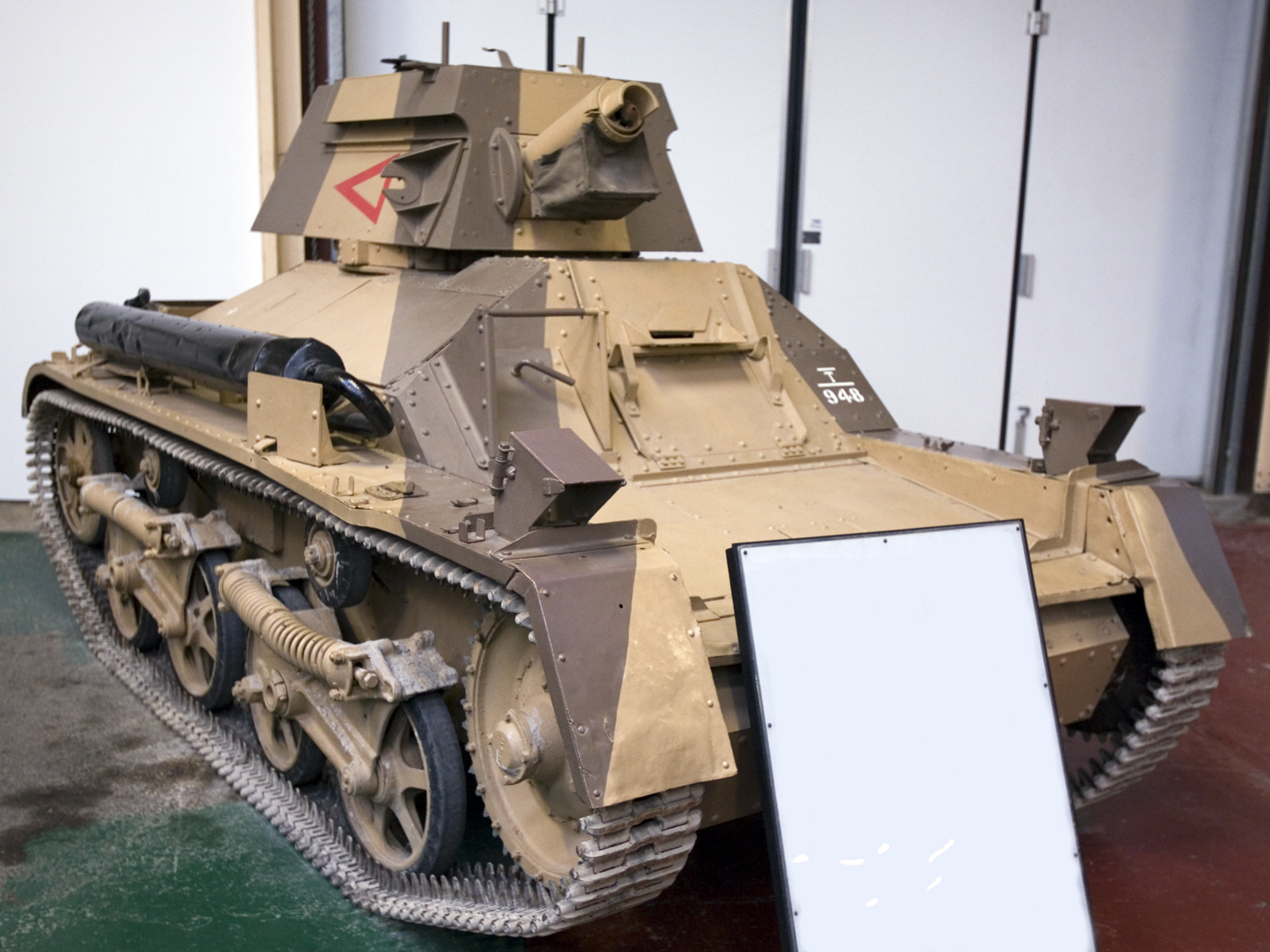
Light Tank Mk IIA at Bovington Tank Museum

The Mark II used a 66 hp (49 kW) Rolls-Royce engine which was, along with the Wilson preselector gearbox and transmission, on the right-hand side of the tank. This left the left-hand side free for the driver and commander. Tanks for use in India had an 85 hp (63 kW) Meadows engine and a "crash" gearbox. The turret was rectangular in form and the machine-gun was modified for vehicle use with a pistol grip instead of the spade grips of the infantry version.

- MK II: 16 built by Vickers Armstrong from 1929
- Mk IIA: 29 constructed at the Royal Arsenal, Woolwich
- Mk IIB: 21 built by Vickers-Armstrong

The running gear of the Vickers Light Dragon Mark I artillery tractor used the tracks and suspension of the Light Tank Mk II, and that of the Light Dragon Mark IIA used the components from the Light Tank Mk IIA.

=== Tank, Light, Mk III ===
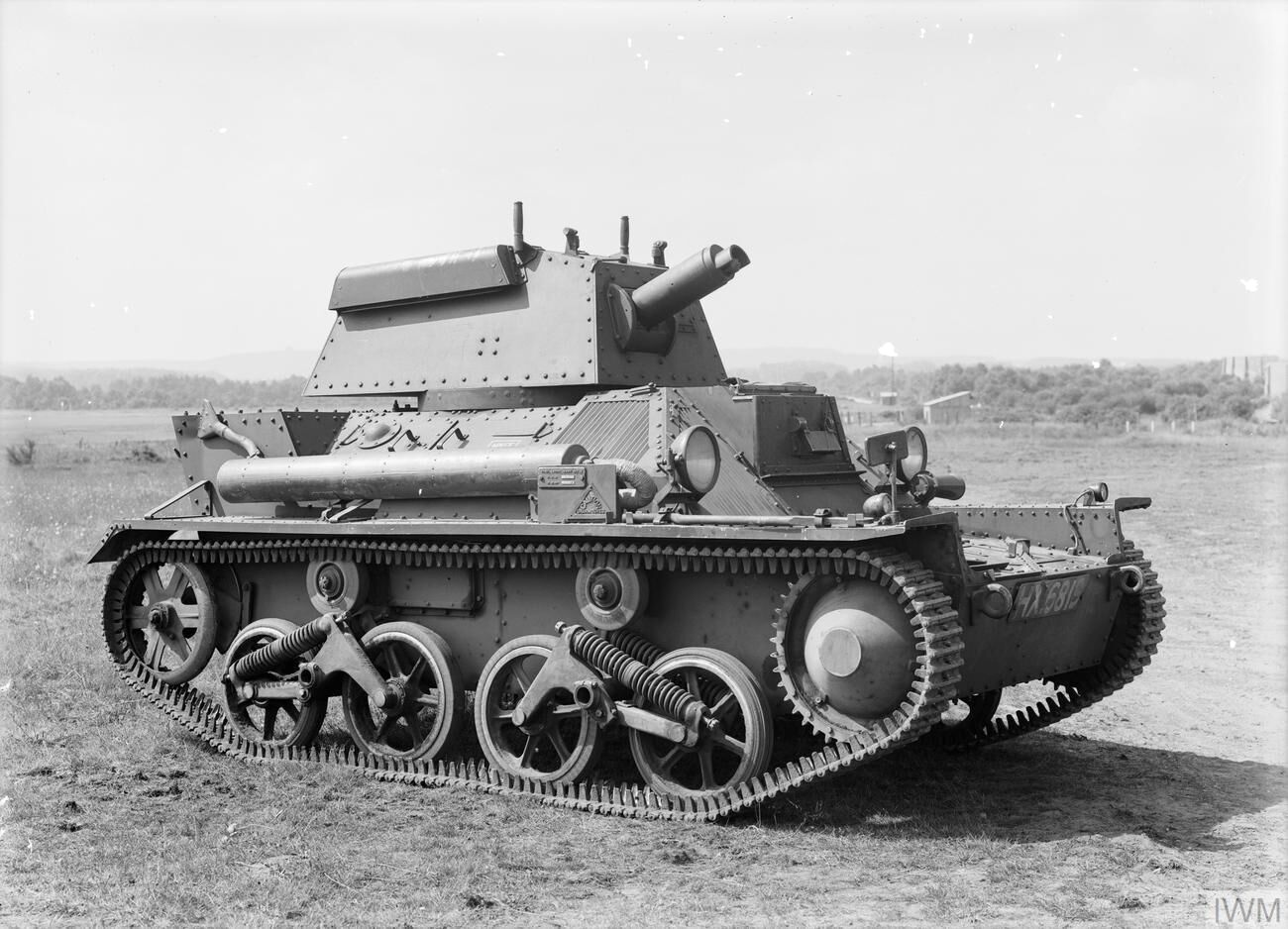
Mk III Vickers Light 5-ton tank

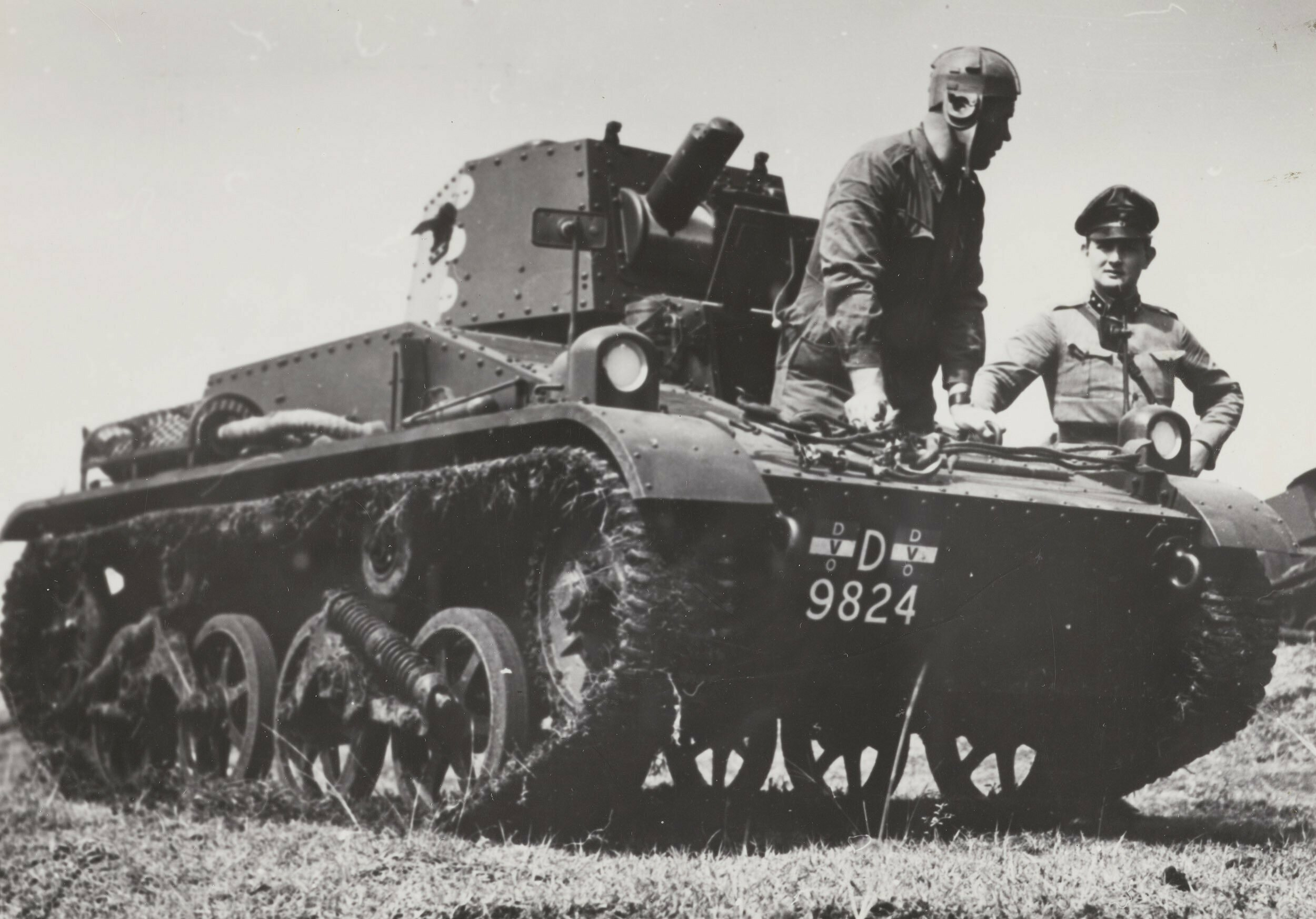
Mk IIIB light tank used the Dutch East Indies against Japan.

The Mark III light tank suspension was made out of Horstmann coil springs controlling bogies with two rubber-lined wheel sets per bogie. This design, invented by Sidney Horstmann and exclusively used on lightweight vehicles, was also used up to the Light Tank Mk VI. Apart from being relatively easy to build, compact and lightweight, it had the advantage of having a long travel and was easy to replace when damaged in the field. The drive sprocket was in the front while the idler-wheels were placed in the rear, with two return rollers. Power came in the form of a Henry Meadows six-cylinder petrol engine, producing 88 hp (66 kW), coupled with a four-speed preselector gearbox. Steering was a combination of de-clutching the drive to one track and braking to increase the turn. The traverse of the turret was electrically actuated.

- Forty-two produced from 1934. Rolls-Royce engine and Wilson gearbox. Extended rear superstructure. Revised suspension. Thirty-six sent to Egypt.
- The Royal Netherlands East Indies Army ordered 73 Mk IIIBs in 1937 and they were used during the Dutch East Indies campaign against Japan
- Modified for Belgium as the Vickers T-15 light tank
- A single Vickers Light Dragon Mark IIB artillery tractor (which used the chassis and running gear from the Light Tank Mk III) was purchased by Belgium. It was considerably modified to produce the much heavier T-13 B3 tank destroyer armed with a 47 mm Model 1931 anti-tank gun. These vehicles were made in Belgium under licence in Familleureux, Hainaut, by the Ateliers de construction de et à Familleureux.

=== Tank, Light, Mk IV ===
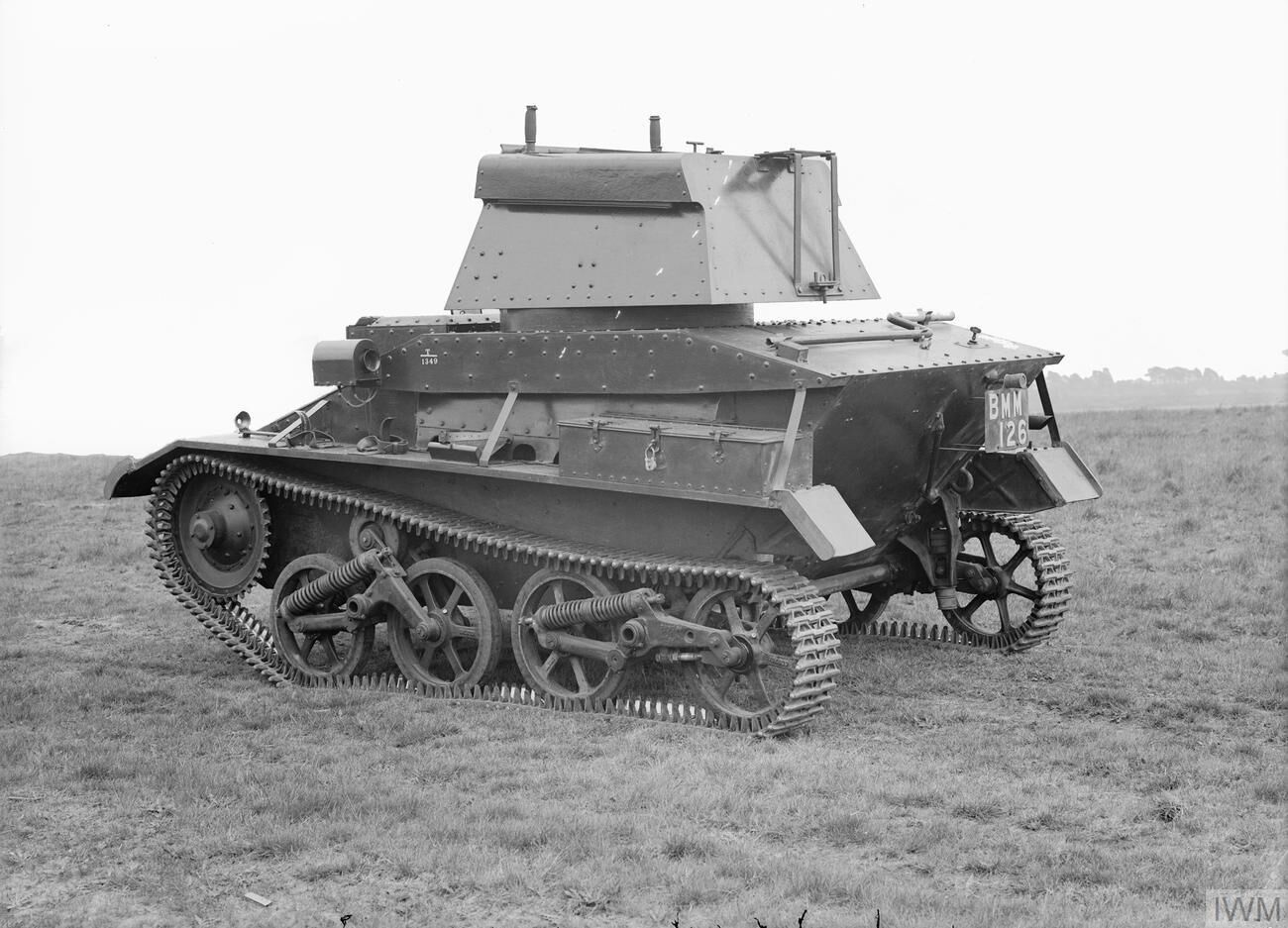
Light Tank Mk IV

The Mark IV saw use in training, and weighed about five tonnes. These models had crews of two and were armed with Vickers machine guns. The idler wheels were removed, with the bogie wheels being respaced. The design once again used a Meadows built engine this time rated for 90 HP.

29 of the Mk IV A version were sent to India. These had their turrets extended upwards. The 9th Armoured Car and Light Tank Company, Royal Tank Corps, were equipped with these tanks. They were sent to the North-West Frontier of India and took part in the Waziristan campaign (1936–1939) against the Pashtun tribesmen of that region. The use of bullet-proof machine-gun armed tanks (and RAF planes) wore down resistance. By 1940 the area was quiet with only the occasional raid on a village. It remained this way until the end of British rule in 1947. Although some Mk IV tanks were still in use at the start of World War II, they were removed as not fit for service in armoured divisions.

- A Vickers design of 1933, 34 built from 1934.

A surviving MkIV is the oldest running tank in the collection of The Tank Museum, Bovington.

=== Tank, Light, Mk V ===
The biggest change from the Mark IV to the Mark V was the introduction of a three-man crew. The turret now carried the commander and the gunner, who was also the radio operator. The increase in the crew size increased the tank's effectiveness and spread the maintenance load. Until then, the commander had to direct the driver, navigate and operate the gun. If troop commander, he also directed the other tanks and their fire.

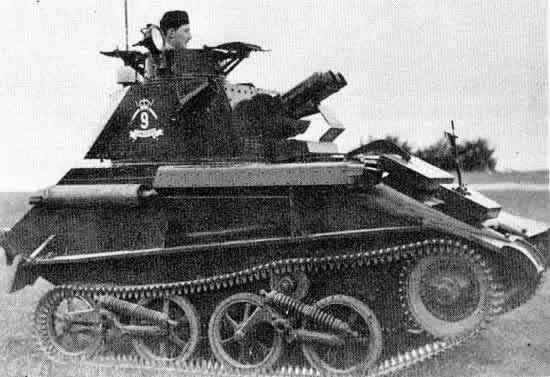
Light Tank Mk V

The armament of the Mark V was an improvement over the earlier marks; a 0.5 inch Vickers machine gun was added to the existing 0.303. The bigger gun gave the tank a reasonable capability against other light tanks—at the time most European light tanks had around 12–14 millimetres (0.47–0.55 in) of armour—but it was not updated as light tanks with more armour came into use. It was half a ton heavier—and about 18 inches longer—than the Mark IV. The weight increase had the effect of reducing the top speed to 32 mph (51 km/h) though range was largely unchanged. The first tanks produced were sent along with a team from Vickers to the 1st Battalion RTC. This unusual level of co-operation between manufacturer and user led to rapid resolution of problems and implementation of improvements. During 1936, 22 were produced.

=== Light Tank Mk VI ===
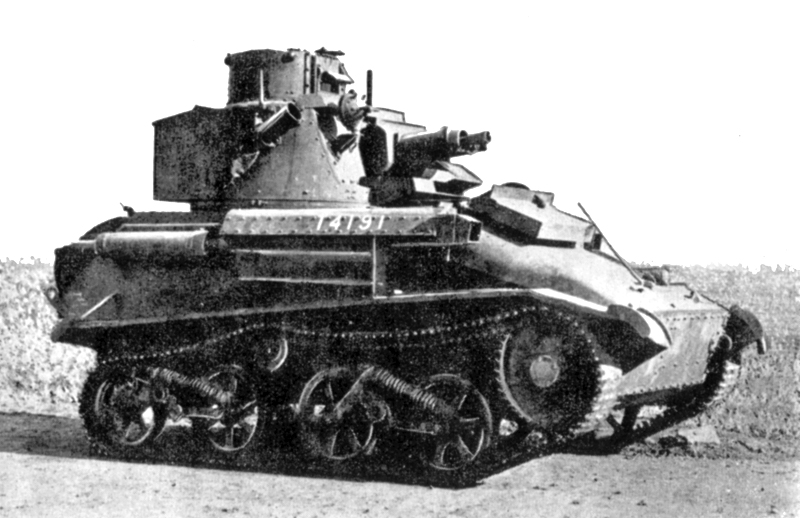
Light Tank Mk VIB

The Light Tank Mk VI was a continuation of the Mark V design. It also had a three-man crew but a larger turret to accommodate a radio set and had an 88 hp engine for higher speed, despite the heavier weight. Between 1936 and 1940, over 1,300 Mark VIs were built, in several variants that represented solutions to problems with the initial design.

=== Commercial Carden-Loyd tanks ===
The basic form of the light tank was used by Vickers for export markets. This included the 1933, 1934, 1936 and 1937 models. Buyers included Finland, Lithuania, Latvia, Argentina, Belgium, Switzerland, the Dutch East Indies and China.

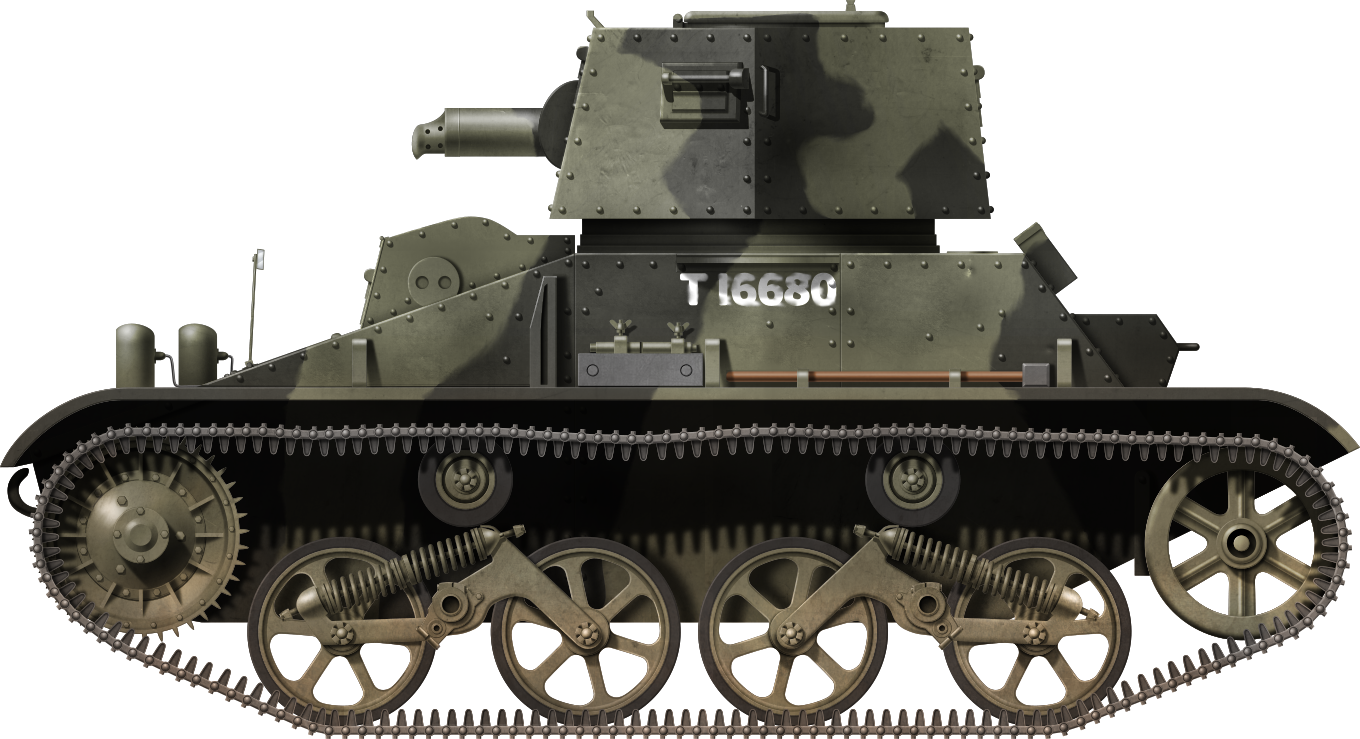
Side Profile of a "Dutchman" Light Tank in Greek service

Forty-two were produced for Belgium in 1935, based on the Mark III with a different turret on request of Belgium's armed forces. Armed with a French 13.2 mm Hotchkiss machine gun, they were designated Char Léger de Reconnaissance Vickers-Carden-Loyd Mod.1934 T.15 by the Belgians.

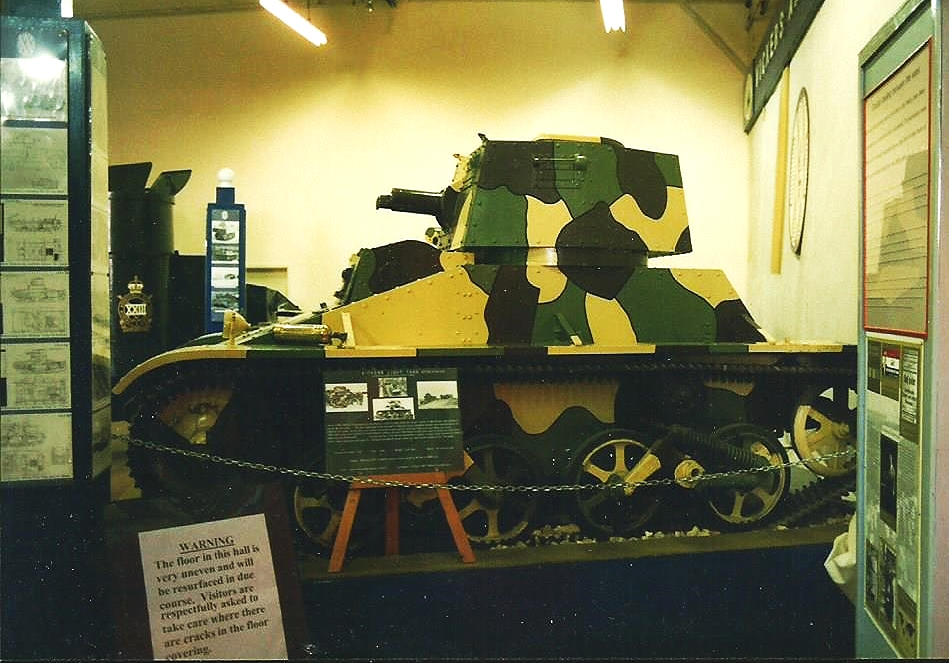
A preserved Light Tank Model 1936 "Dutchman"

After two tanks had been bought for trials in 1937, the Dutch East Indies in 1938 ordered a further 73 tanks of the 1936 model, which was "mechanically similar" to the Mark IV but with a hexagonal turret and the armament of a Mark II. Only 20 tanks arrived in Java before the outbreak of the Second World War in Europe, and those which were not delivered were taken into service with the British Army as the "Tank Light, Vickers Carden-Loyd, Model 1936" - in practice they were referred to by the nickname "Dutchman". They were used for training duties only. A number of these tanks were delivered to Greece.

== Service history ==
The light tanks were kept in use for training until around 1942. Some saw active use in the Battle of France, the Western desert or Abyssinia from 1940–1941. They were followed by the Light Tank Mk VI from 1936. Like many of its predecessors, the Mark VI was used by the British Army to perform imperial policing duties in British India and other colonies in the British Empire, a role for which it and the other Vickers-Armstrongs light tanks were found to be well suited.

== See also ==
- Tanks of the interwar period
- Tanks in World War II
