= Vickers Light Dragon =

British field artillery tractor, 1929–1935

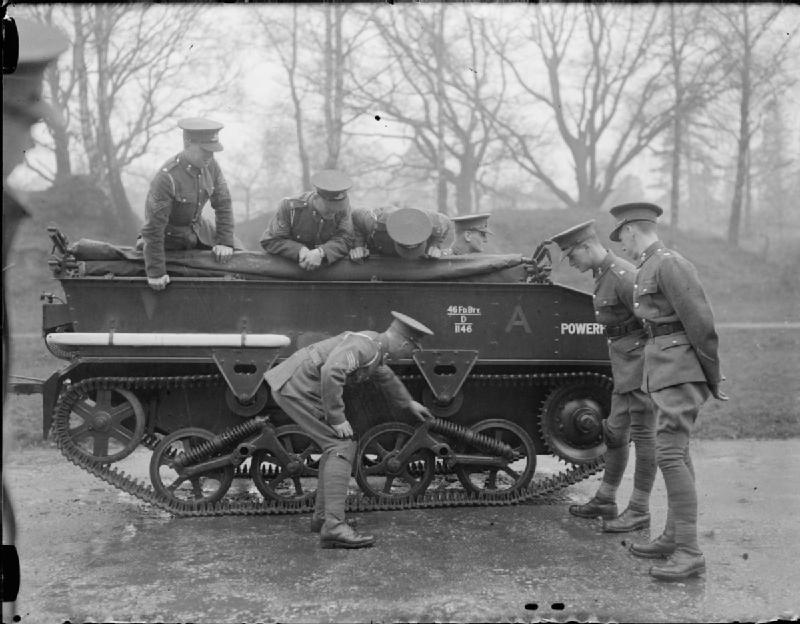
Light Dragon Mark IIB at Pirbright, 1940

The Vickers Light Dragon was a fully tracked British field artillery tractor made by Vickers-Armstrongs Ltd from 1929 to 1935. Designed to tow small-calibre field guns, it complemented Vickers' Medium Dragon tractor, which pulled medium to heavy artillery.

There were three main versions, Light Dragon Marks I-III. The first two were based on the chassis of Vickers Light Tanks Marks II and III, and the Light Dragon Mark III used the running gear of the Vickers-Armstrongs DA50, an early version of what became the Universal Carrier.

== Mark I ==
The Vickers Light Dragon was manufactured at the Woolwich Arsenal and was intended to tow the QF 18-pounder gun.

The chassis and running gear came from the Vickers Light Tank Mk II, which first appeared in 1929. There were four large spoked road wheels in pairs, using Horstmann suspension with horizontal coil springs, and three return rollers. The front sprockets were solid, the rear sprockets spoked. The vehicle had a flat front panel.

In a British recognition guide to the German Panzer III issued in November 1942, the sketches of the tracks of the Panzer I, Panzer II, Panzer III and Panzer IV indicate that they had their pedigree in the original tracks from the Dragon Mark I.

=== Mark 1A ===
It had a sloping front panel; the suspension and tracks were similar to the Mark I with three return rollers. Like the Carden Loyd tankettes, the Light Dragon Marks I and II used clutch-brake steering, which suffered from the unfortunate habit of sometimes turning the opposite way to what an inexperienced driver intended when travelling downhill.

The engine was on the right-hand side directly behind the driver. The four crew sat on a bench around the left-hand side and at the rear.

== Mark II ==
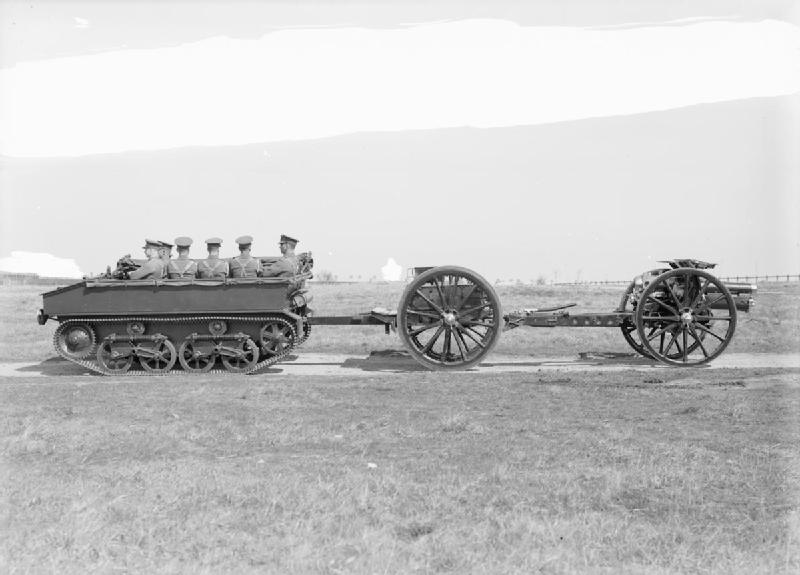
Mark II or Mark IIA towing a QF 4.5 inch howitzer

A more powerful engine was fitted, a petrol 4.5 litre Meadows 6-cylinder. The armour was improved, with better accommodation for the crew. The suspension springs are horizontal like on the Mark I, but there are only two return rollers, similar to the Vickers Light Tank Mk IIA. The front of the vehicle has a sloping front plate. The exhaust pipe exits the body half-way back on the left-hand side. The headlights were mounted low down on a short vertical front plate, level with the top of the tracks.

=== Mk IIB ===
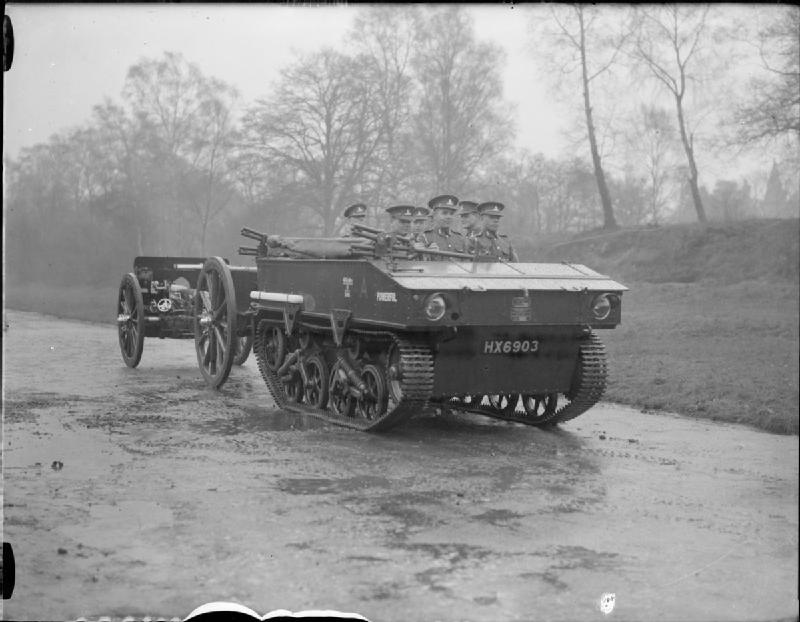
Light Dragon Mark IIB with QF 18-pounder gun

The running gear is basically like that of the Vickers Light Tank Mk III. The angled suspension springs make a triangle shape. The two return rollers are protected by triangular flanges, which do not appear on the Light Tank Mk III. A large silencer was mounted horizontally at the rear of the vehicle.

A number of sources claim that the Belgian T-13 B3 tank destroyer (or Type 3) was based on the Light Dragon Mark IIB. It seems that a single vehicle was purchased for trials (being cheaper than an entire tank), but the resulting production vehicle bears almost no resemblance to the Dragon. As photographs clearly show, the bogie suspension was changed from coil springs to leaf springs to cope with the extra weight of the turret. The tracks were strengthened; the upper body is completely different; and a more powerful engine was fitted. They were made in Belgium under licence by the Ateliers de construction de et à Familleureux, and there appears to be little connection between the two vehicles.

=== Mark IIC ===
The exhaust pipe is protected by a larger diameter pipe, possibly armoured. The headlights are recessed into the front plate, covered by semi-circular hoods beneath overhanging sloping front plate.

There was also a Mark IID.

== Mk III ==
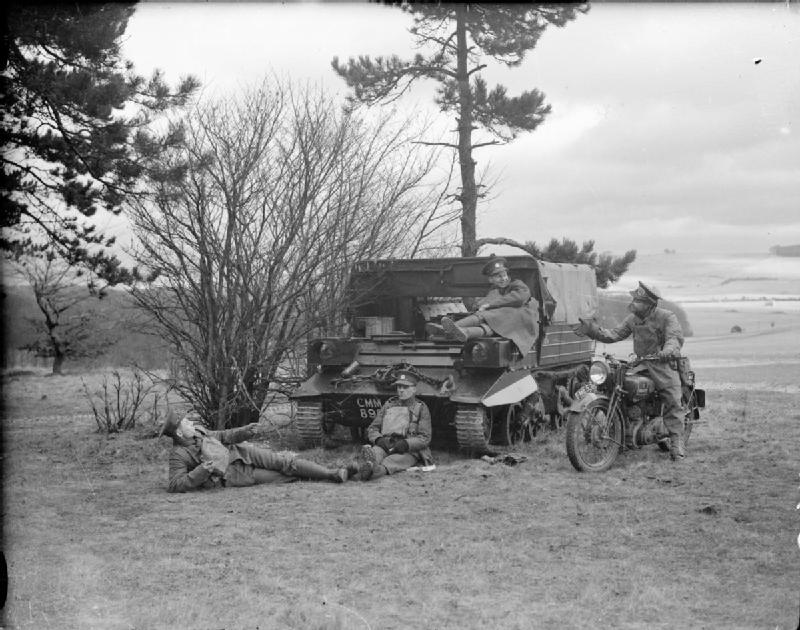
Mark III with the hood up

The Marks I and II of the Light Dragon were relatively expensive and specialised, and in search of something cheaper and more commercial Vickers-Armstrongs produced the DA50 in 1934. This was intended to be used as either an artillery tractor or to transport a machine gun and its crew. The War Office saw it as possible replacement for both the current Light Dragons and Carden-Loyd tankettes. Two prototypes were ordered in 1935 - one for each purpose - becoming in turn the basis for the Machine Gun Carrier Mk I, which evolved into the Bren Carrier, and an artillery tractor, the Light Dragon Mark III.

The Mark III had no position for the Vickers machine gun and more space in the back. The wheelbase is shorter than the Mark II, with only three road wheels per side, and only one return roller. The front sprockets are spoked, with solid rear idlers - the reverse of the Light Dragon Marks I and II.

For identification purposes the Light Dragon Mark III has the rear sprocket set high, and the suspension springs form a triangle shape - in contrast with the Light Tank Mk IV, which has the rear sprocket on the ground and suspension springs both pointing the same way. The sloping front was re-designed with a flat vertical section immediately in front of the driver: the headlights are mounted on boxy extensions at driver level. Distinctive forward-sloping mudguard wings cover the tracks at the front of the vehicle, in common with the Machine Gun Carrier Mk I.

The engine, gearbox and transmission were all made by Ford: the centrally located engine was a commercial V-8, coupled to a 4-speed gearbox with 1 reverse, driving a standard truck rear axle and differential. The steering, probably the invention of Sir John Carden and his assistant Leslie Little, was a great improvement on the earlier Dragons. The front suspension units were mounted on a common axle which was capable of being moved laterally sideways. When the driver turned the steering wheel a small amount, both front bogies were pushed sideways which bent the tracks. For tighter turns, a greater movement of the steering wheel brought skid steering into play, where a clutchless brake was applied to one side or other of the differential.

Only sixty-nine Light Dragons Mark III were bought from Vickers-Armstrongs before there was a policy change to use wheeled vehicles to tow guns in the British Army. '

== Variants ==
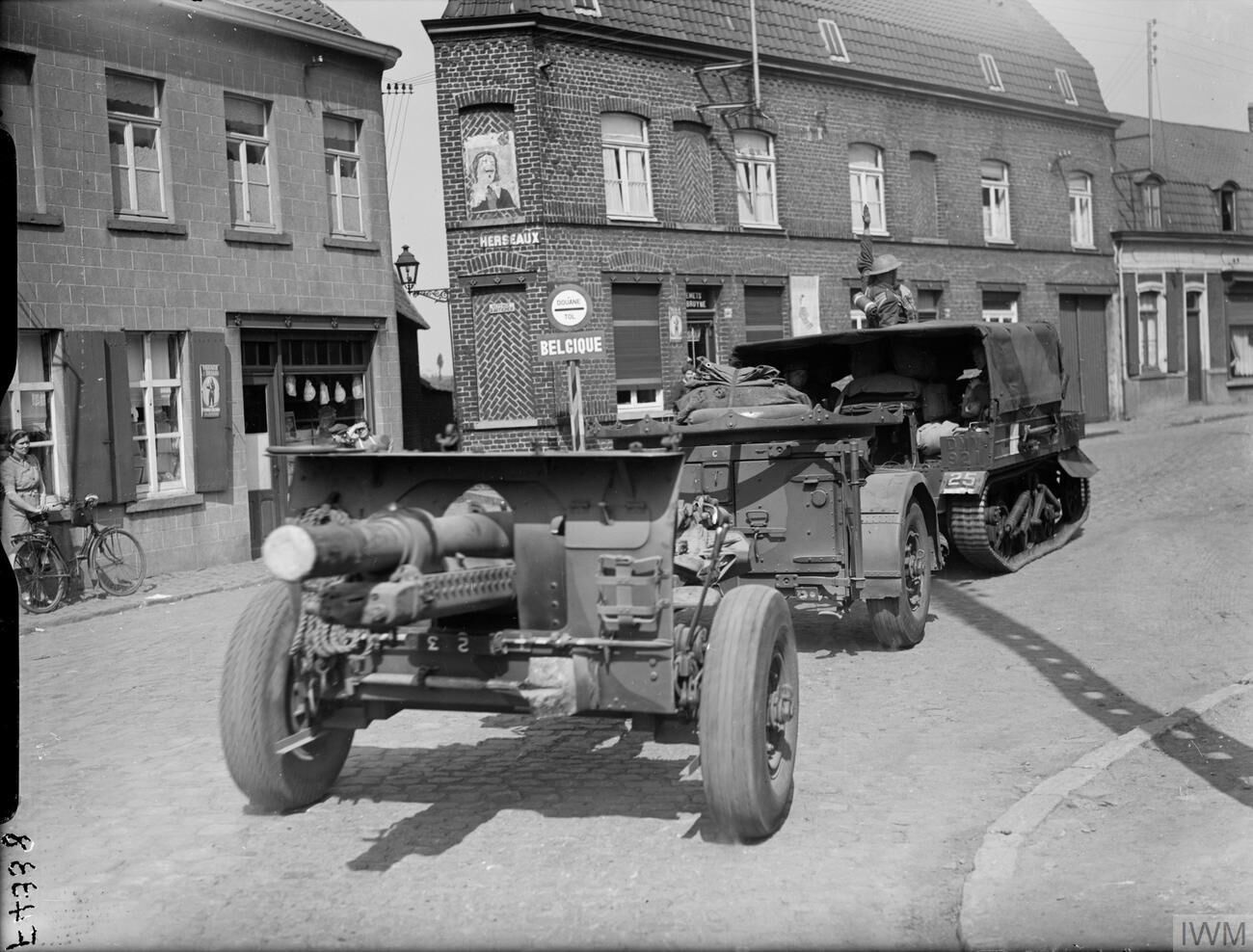
A Mark III pulling an 18/25 pounder (Note: The 18/25-pounder was the new 25-pounder gun-howitzer barrel mounted on conversions of older 18-pounder field gun carriages) and limber, Belgium, 1940

Data source:

- Light Dragon Mark I (c1929) ~ Gun Tractor. - Based on Vickers Mark II Light Tank
- Light Dragon Mark II Based on Vickers Mark III Light Tank
- Light Dragon Mark IIB ~ Version with revised seating arrangements
- Light Dragon Mark IIC ~ With exhaust pipe protector
- Light Dragon Mark IID ~
- Light Dragon Mark III (c1934) ~ Unarmoured Vickers D50 based gun tractor.

== Gallery ==
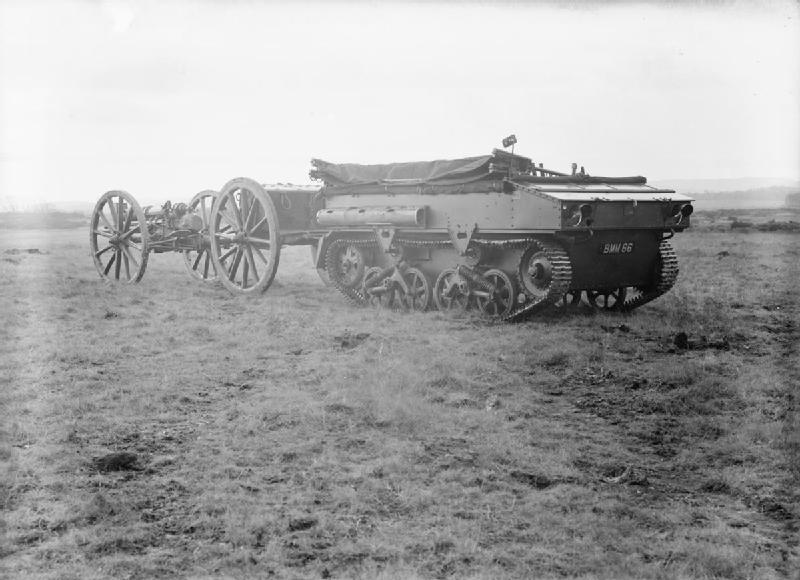
Light Dragon Mark IIC

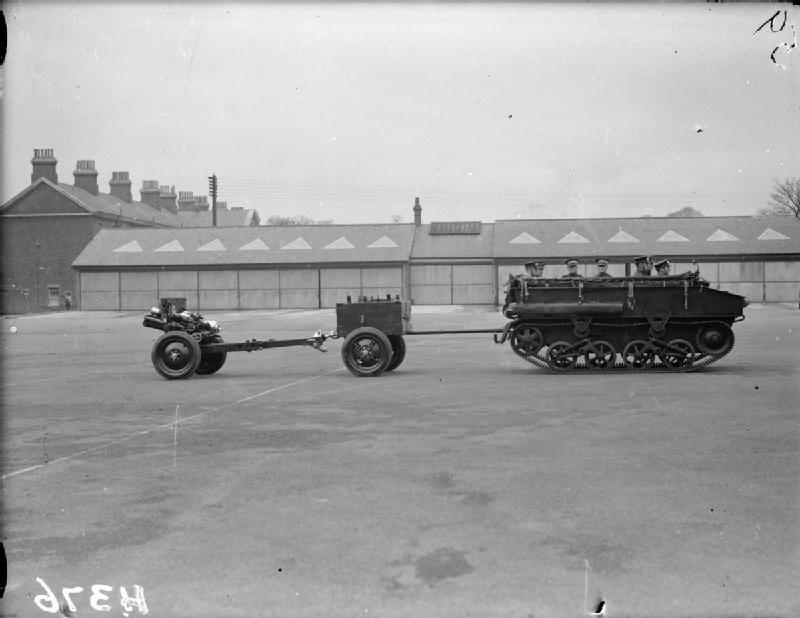
Mark IIC with 3.7inch pack howitzer & limber
