= Horstmann suspension =

Type of tracked vehicle suspension

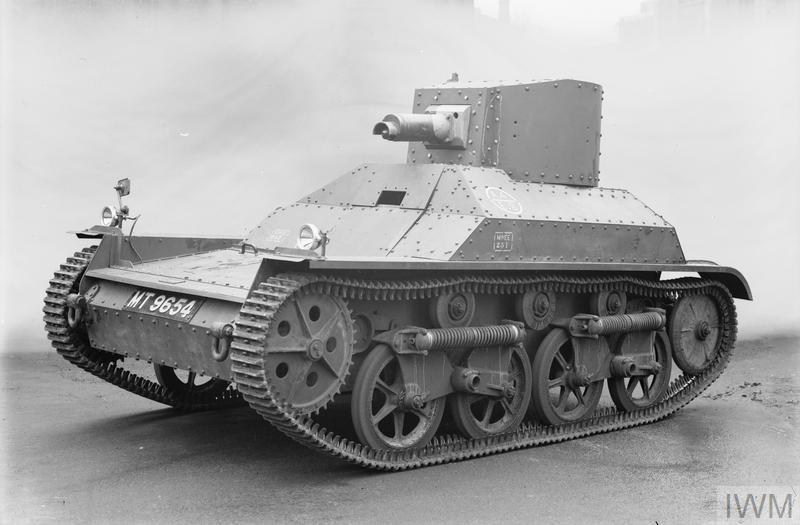
The Light Tank Mk Ia (A4E8 prototype) became the first tank in the world to use the Horstmann design. In this case the spring is outside the track area, leaving room for track return rollers to lie directly over the suspension in a particularly compact layout.

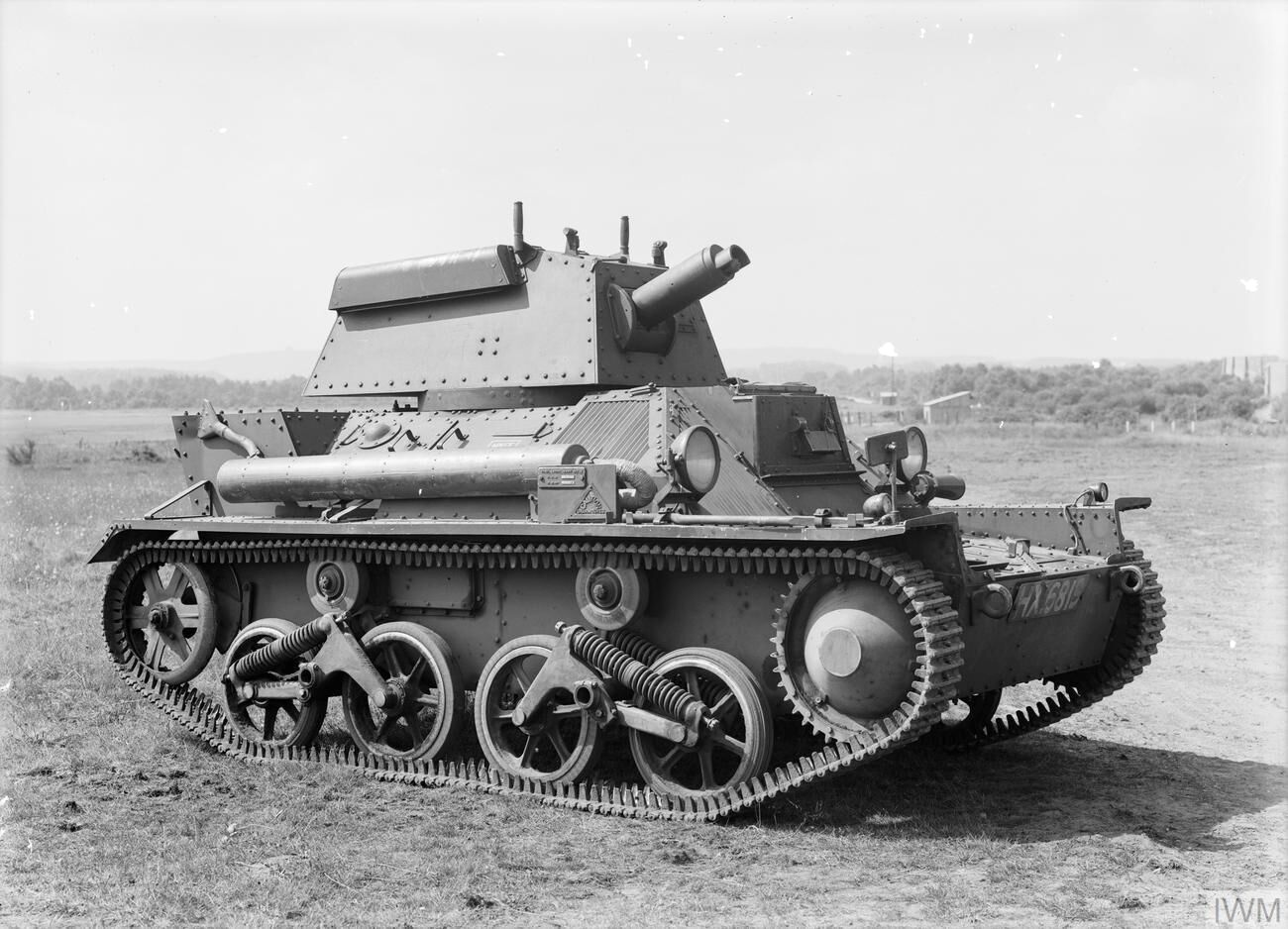
The Light Tank Mk III introduced a slightly modified version with only one bell crank per bogie, causing the spring to lie somewhat angled as a result. This system was used on the Universal Carrier.

Horstmann suspension, also known as Horstman, Vickers-Horstman and rarely Slow Motion, is a type of tracked suspension devised by British tank designer John Carden and worked into a production design by engineer Sidney Horstmann.

First used on the A6E3 Medium Tank prototype in 1935, it proved far superior to previous suspensions from Vickers. It was widely used on World War II-era tank designs but in the post-war era was increasingly limited to British tanks as newer systems emerged in other countries. The last tank to use this basic mechanism was the Chieftain, designed in the late 1950s.

Horstman Defence Systems remains a tank suspension specialist to this day and makes a range of systems based mostly on torsion systems with hydrodynamic damping. They are also referred to as "Horstman suspensions" although they have no details in common with their earlier designs.

== History ==
Sidney Horstmann became interested in suspension designs in the 1920s as part of his efforts to improve the ride of the cars being built in Bath by his Horstmann Cars company. This led to a new design using multiple coil springs in automotive suspension, and the creation of the Slow Motion Suspension Company to sell the design to all makers. Horstman Cars went bankrupt in 1929, leaving Slow Motion a going concern.

It is worth noting that patent applications on suspension systems, which Horstmann filed in 1927-1930, describe "Slow Motion"-type automobile ones very different from what is now called a Horstmann suspension because none of them features bogies (and in fact some are not dissimilar to Christie suspension).

Fletcher claims that in 1934, John Carden of Vickers-Armstrongs had a "bright idea" for a new type of tank suspension and partnered with Horstmann's Slow Motion to turn it into a working design. At the time, the British Army was testing, largely to their dislike, the A6 series medium tank prototypes. Among their many problems, the Vickers-supplied "box" suspension proved to be very springy and led to the tank rocking for some time after firing the main gun.

However, the suspension actually dates back to ca. 1930 when Vickers either produced the A4E8 prototype, which was designated Light Tank Mk Ia and became a forerunner of the Mk. II, or converted several prototype tanks to the new suspension. The Vickers Light Dragon Mk. I artillery tractor was another vehicle from that time which used the same suspension.

In fact, the earliest attestation of the term "Horstmann suspension" itself dates back to January 1934, when Christopher Ainsworth Davis presented his joint paper with Horstmann on "Slow Motion" automotive suspensions and mentioned that "a special type of high-speed cross-country tracked tractor" (presumably the Dragon) performed very well in tests.

The new design used two road wheels on a single bogie, each connected to a bell crank with a horizontal coil spring between the crank arms, and double-acting shock absorbers to control recoil. This was fitted to the A6E3 between February and April 1935 and immediately proved to dramatically improve stability. E3 had also been fitted with a more powerful 500 hp Thornycroft RY/12 marine engine in an effort to improve performance, but in testing, this showed no benefit and ultimately only three examples of the Medium Mark III were produced. Several other medium tanks, including the A9 and A14, used the same design.

Carden was killed in an air crash in December 1935, but by this time he had designed a lighter tank platform that had been taken up as the A10, although later known as the Cruiser Mk I. In this version, one large wheel was fitted on one bell crank, and two smaller wheels to a shared arm on the second crank. This went into production in 1937 as an interim type until the Army could develop a tank using the Christie suspension. The same suspension was then used on the larger Cruiser Mk II which came to its ultimate form as the Valentine tank.

A further variation on the basic concept was introduced as part of various light tank projects, notably the Light Tank Mk III of 1932 which saw use in Egypt. This version was essentially a two-wheel variation of the design for the A10. This variation was then found on a huge variety of following designs including the Universal Carrier of 1934, and the variations on that design like the Loyd Carrier.

In 1943, a single Ram tank, a Canadian-built version of the M4 Sherman, was modified to trial Horstmann type suspension. This used two full bell cranks like the earliest designs, but moved the shock absorbers to the lower side of the wheels. Although this was highly successful, running over 2,000 miles (3,200 km) in testing, the Ram was cancelled in favour of purchasing US-built M4s and turning Canadian production to other designs. A single Sherman V, serial T-148350, was then converted in a similar fashion. This proved successful in terms of ride quality, but unreliable in testing. By this time the US Army was testing a huge variety of new suspension concepts, eventually choosing one of these for the late-war M4E8 models. The single Horstman Sherman ran 340 miles (550 km) before the project was cancelled in 1945.

As the war wound down, the British Army was deep in the development of their first "universal tank", which would combine the armour of a heavy tank with the mobility of a medium. This was originally to use a Christie-type suspension, but as the design continued to grow in power and weight this had to be abandoned. In its place, Associated Equipment Company designer G.J. Rackham came up with a modification of the Horstman able to support the larger frame. This was essentially identical to the original two-bell system, but had three coil springs, one inside the other, to give it the required weight performance. This design emerged at the end of the war as the Centurion.

In the immediate post-war era of WWII, information about German torsion bar suspension systems used in the Panther and Tiger tanks became more widely known and led to a revolution in post-war tank design. Britain, however, did not take advantage of these changes as the Centurion was proving to be one of the best tanks in the world at the time. Its performance during the Korean War was particularly notable as it was able to climb onto hills that no other tank could (due to its Rolls-Royce Meteor engine, more than the suspension) and destroy opposing tanks at the limit of visibility.

When the Centurion finally began to be made obsolete with the introduction of the newer Soviet types, little development of new systems had taken place. Thus, when the need for a new design was finally raised in the late 1950s, a number of improved versions of the Centurion were trialled. As they were essentially improvements to the existing design, as opposed to all-new concepts, the Centurion's Horstmann suspension was further improved to handle yet larger weights.

== Description ==
The principal design feature is that two or more wheels are mounted to a common framework to form a bogie. In the original two-wheel version, the wheels are mounted on an L-shaped swing arm that forms a bell crank, so the upward movement of the wheel is turned into sideways motion of the top of the crank. The two arms may be mounted on a common pivot shaft between them, or more commonly, two closely spaced shafts. The two wheels share a coil spring running horizontally between the tops of the crank arms. Thus if one wheel moves up over an obstacle, the spring is compressed against the swing arm of the other wheel. This variation was used on the early experiments, as well as the Soviet T-37 tank.

Versions for lighter vehicles typically replaced one of the two crank arms with a straight bar, with the spring running from the top of the remaining crank arm to the end of the bar. The resulting action is similar, in that an obstruction that causes upward movement of either wheel results in the spring being compressed and providing a restoring force to both wheels.

An advantage to the Horstmann design is that the suspended weight is not placed entirely on the rising wheel: its paired partner will also increase its downward force due to the shared spring, spreading the load. In systems with fully independent wheels, it is possible for the entire tank to become suspended on one wheel, which is rare in the Horstmann case. Another advantage is that the spring may work both in compression and expansion, increasing the total travel of the suspension. From a maintenance standpoint, the fact that the spring connects at a single non-moving point and is otherwise self-contained makes it easy to remove and replace in the field. The location of the spring over the wheels also makes it quite compact, with little or no encroachment on internal hull space.

== Comparable suspension designs ==
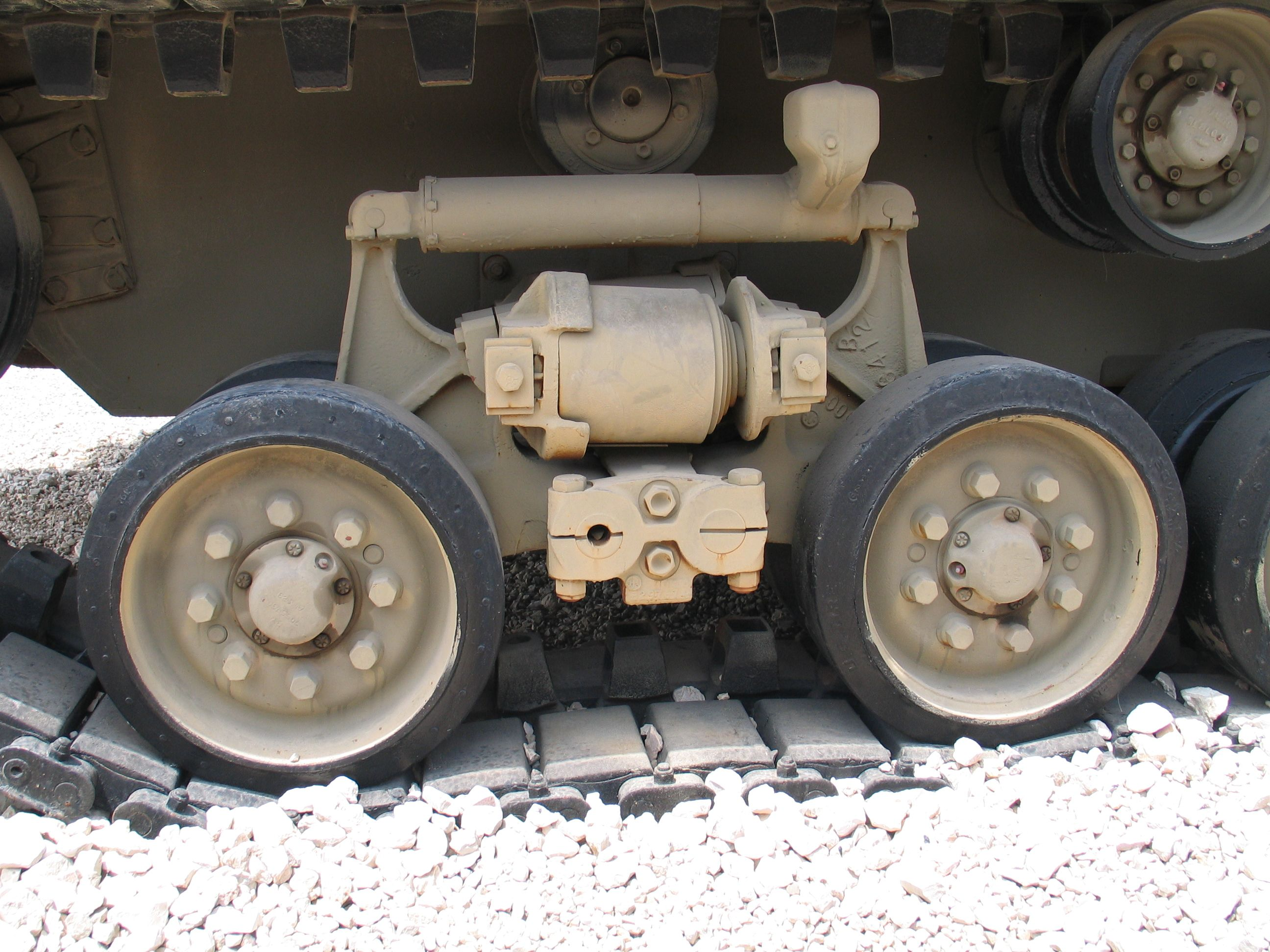
The horizontal volute spring suspension used on late-model Sherman tanks is similar to the Horstmann design. The two wheels per bogie, two crank arms, springs between the cranks and single mounting point are all evident. This model also includes a shock absorber for further improvements in ride quality.

A wide variety of bogie-based suspension designs were introduced during the early days of tank design, but few used the concept of a common spring under compression in the fashion of Carden's original concept. For instance, the American vertical volute spring suspension (VVSS) shares many design notes but uses two separate springs compressing vertically against the bogie framework rather than each other.

In contrast, the late-war horizontal volute spring suspension, or HVSS, has more in common with the Horstman design, using a volute spring in compression between the two crank arms, as well as a shock absorber above the spring. HVSS was a major feature of the M4A3E8 model "Easy Eight" ('easy' being the US Army phonetic code for 'E' at the time).

Mechanically, the design also shares much in common with the Christie suspension, which also uses a bell crank to press on a spring. The main difference is that in the Christie, each wheel is mounted separately, and the spring is usually mounted on or inside the tank hull. The longer spring allows for more controlled flexion and potentially longer throw. Christie suspensions are generally more difficult to maintain because the wheels and suspension are mounted separately, and a broken spring can be difficult to reach without removing the wheels.

== Uses ==
The name "Horstmann suspension" was sometimes applied to any transmission system that has two opposed swing arms, no matter the type of springing between them. The name also refers to any suspension built by the Horstman company (now Horstman Defence Systems) whether of the bogie type, torsion beam design, hydrogas, hydropneumatic or other.

The Horstmann system was used on, amongst others, the following vehicles:

- Universal (Bren gun) carrier
- Loyd Carrier
- Vickers light tanks
- Centurion tank
- Chieftain tank

Horstman-built suspension is used on:

- Challenger 2 tank
- Warrior Armoured Fighting Vehicle
- AS-90 self-propelled gun
- Terrier engineering vehicle
- PUMA IFV
