= 107mm M1938 mortar =

Soviet mortar

107mm mortar M1938
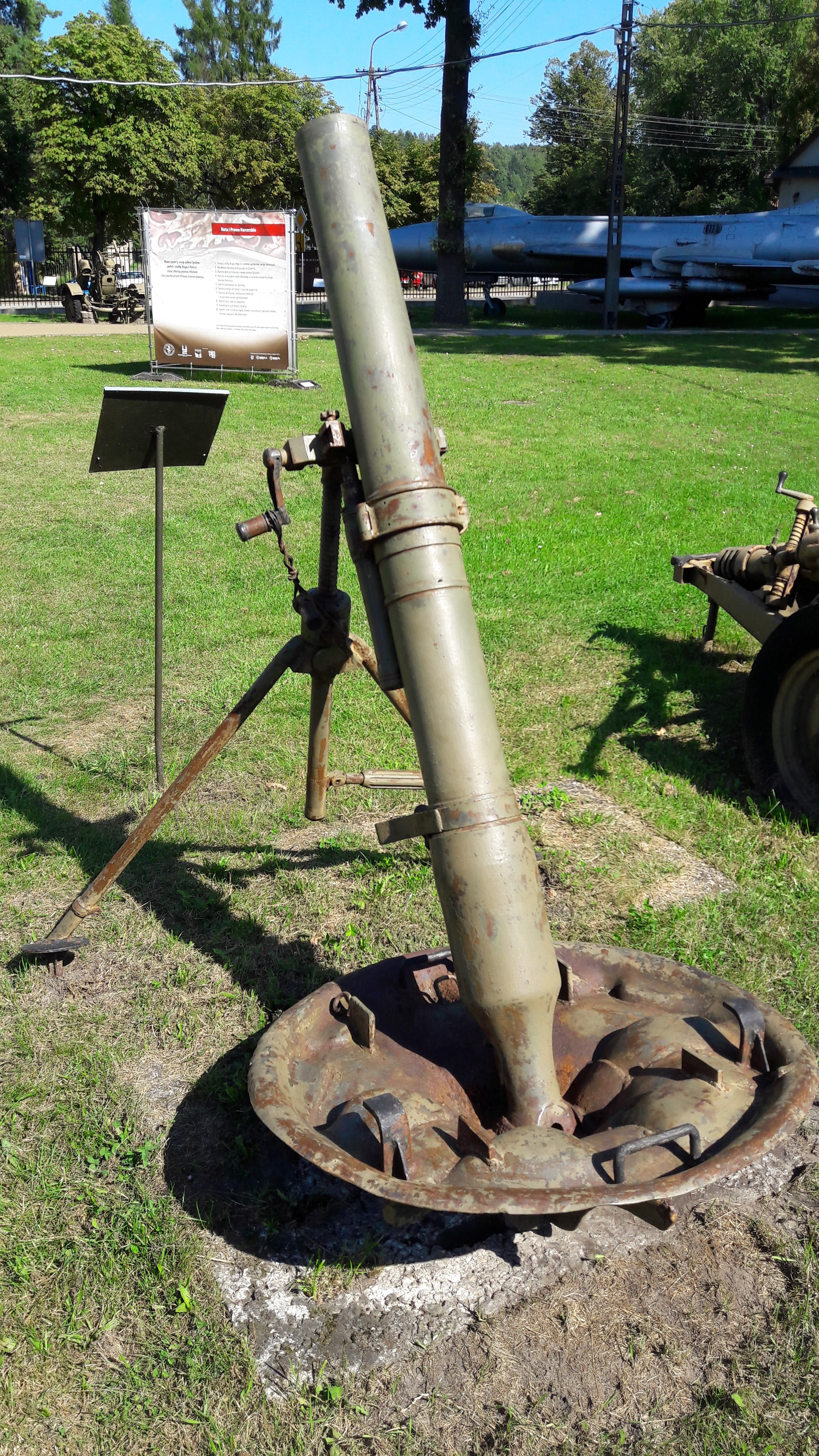
- 107mm mortar M1938 in White Eagle Museum
- Type: Heavy mortar
- Place of origin: Soviet Union

Service history
- In service: 1943–1975 (Soviet Union); 1938–present
- Wars: World War II; Korean War; Vietnam War; Laotian Civil War; Lebanese Civil War; Afghan Wars; 2011 Libyan civil war

Production history
- Designed: 1936

Specifications
- Mass: 170 kg (370 lb)
- Barrel length: 1.67 m (5 ft 6 in)
- Diameter: 107 mm
- Crew: 5
- Shell: 9.1 kg (20 lb) bomb
- Caliber: 107 mm (4.2 in)
- Breech: muzzle loaded
- Elevation: 45° to 80°
- Traverse: 3°
- Rate of fire: 15 rpm
- Muzzle velocity: 302 m/s (990 ft/s)
- Effective firing range: 6.3 km (3.9 mi)
- Filling: TNT
- Filling weight: 1.0 kg (2 lb 3 oz) (OF-841A)

The Soviet 107mm M1938 mortar was a scaled-down version of the 120mm M1938 mortar intended for use by mountain troops and light enough to be towed by animals on a cart.

== History ==
In World War II, the 107mm mortar saw service with Soviet mountain infantry as a divisional artillery weapon. Weapons captured by the Germans were given the designation 10.7 cm Gebirgsgranatwerfer 328(r). Its last significant use in battle was in the Vietnam War. The ability to break down the weapon made it particularly suited to the rugged terrain of Vietnam.

The mortar fired a light HE round (OF-841) and a heavy HE round (OF-841A). The lighter HE round actually carried a larger bursting charge than the heavier HE round. Both rounds used GVMZ-series point detonation fuzes.

Recently, the weapon has been seen in use by rebel forces during the 2011 Libyan civil war.

== Users ==
- Afghanistan
- People's Republic of China
- Nazi Germany
- Laos
- Kazakhstan
- North Korea
- Russia
- Soviet Union
- Vietnam

and many others

== See also ==
=== Weapons of comparable role, performance and era ===
- Ordnance ML 4.2 inch Mortar - British equivalent
- M2 4.2 inch mortar - US equivalent
