= Loyd Carrier =

British armoured personnel carrier

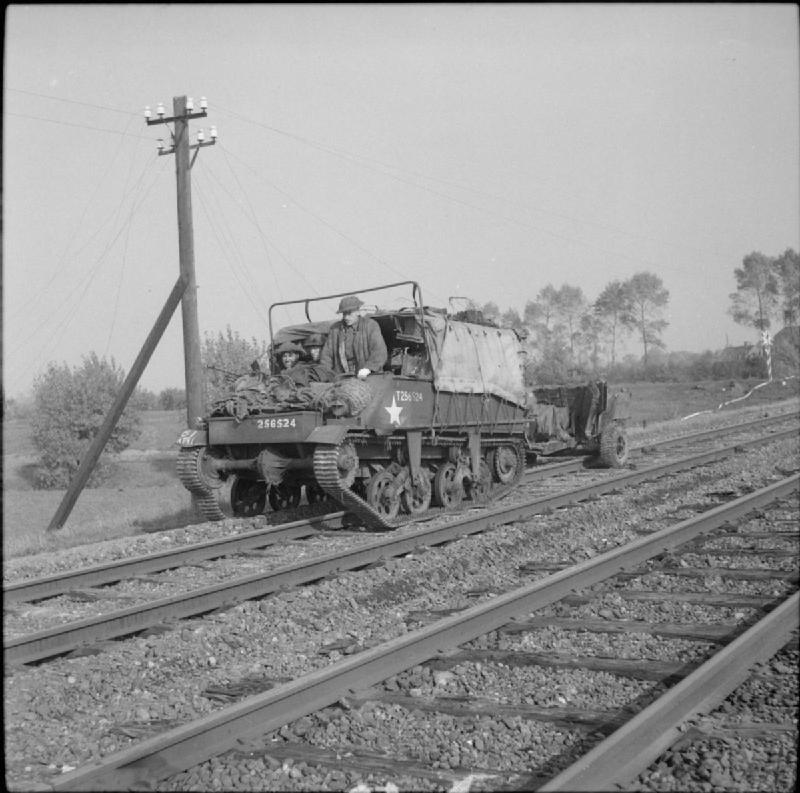
- Loyd TT towing a 6 Pdr anti-tank gun, outside 's-Hertogenbosch 1944
- Type: Armoured personnel carrier
- Place of origin: United Kingdom

Service history
- In service: 1939 -1960s
- Used by: British Commonwealth; Post-war: Denmark Netherlands Belgium
- Wars: Second World War

Production history
- Designer: Vivian Loyd
- Designed: 1939
- Manufacturer: Vivian Loyd & Co, and others (see text)
- Produced: 1939 - 1944
- No. built: 26,000
- Variants: Mark 1, Mark 2

Specifications
- Mass: 4.50 t (4.43 long tons)
- Length: 13 ft 11 in (4.24 m)
- Width: 6 ft 9 in (2.06 m)
- Height: 4 ft 8 in (1.42 m)
- Crew: 1
- Armour: up to 7 mm where fitted
- Main armament: unarmed
- Engine: Ford V8 Side-valve petrol 85 bhp (63 kW)
- Power/weight: 18.9 hp/tonne
- Payload capacity: 7-8 passengers or similar load
- Transmission: Ford 4 forward, 1 reverse gearbox
- Suspension: Horstmann twin wheel bogies
- Ground clearance: 8 in (200 mm)
- Fuel capacity: 22 imp gal (100 L; 26 US gal)
- Operational range: 140 miles (230 km) on roads
- Maximum speed: 30 mph (48 km/h) maximum on road
- Steering system: braked - two drums per track

The Loyd Carrier was one of a number of small tracked vehicles used by the British and Commonwealth forces in the Second World War to transport equipment and men about the battlefield. Alongside the Bren, Scout and Machine Gun Carriers, they also moved infantry support weapons.

== Design and development ==
Development of the Loyd Carrier proceeded rapidly due the use of many parts from other vehicles. The chassis, engine, gearbox, torque tube and front axle were from the 15 cwt 4x2 Fordson 7V truck. The track, drive sprockets, and Horstmann suspension units were the same as the Universal Carrier. The brake drums and back plates were designed specifically for the Loyd. The bodywork was made from mild steel to which armour plate - 'BP Plate' (from "Bullet Proof") - was bolted to the front and upper sides, depending on application.

The engine was at the rear, with the radiator behind, rather than in front. The transmission took the drive forward to the axle at the very front where it drove the tracks. Both the front drive sprockets and idlers, which were sprocketed, at the rear of the tracks were fitted with brakes, actuated by a pair of levers by the driver. To turn the vehicle to the left, the brakes were applied on that side and the Carrier would slew round the stopped track.

The upper hull covered the front and sides but was open to the rear and above. As the Carrier was not expected to function as a fighting vehicle, this was not an issue. To protect the occupants from the weather, a canvas tilt could be put up. This was a standard fitment from the factory.

The Army tested the Loyd Carrier in 1939 and placed an initial order for 200 as the Carrier, Tracked, Personnel Carrying i.e. a personnel carrier. Initial deliveries were from Vivian Loyd's own company. Production moved to the larger firms, including the Ford Motor Company and Wolseley Motors, with 13,000 built between them, and Dennis Brothers Ltd, Aveling & Barford and Sentinel Waggon Works. Total production of the Loyd Carrier was approximately 26,000.

== Service ==
=== Second World War ===
Early in the war, the TT along with the TPC variants were part of the standard equipment of Royal Engineer Chemical Warfare Companies. Most of the Chemical Warfare Companies were disbanded or repurposed in 1943 in order to free up their 4.2 inch mortars for desperately needed conventional use by infantry divisions in-theatre. The mortars and supporting equipment were attached to each division's machine-gun battalion in company strength.

By far the most notable use of the Loyd was in the TT (Tracked Towing) configuration, where it pulled the 6 pounder anti-tank gun from the 1944 Normandy landings to the end of the war. There are many wartime photographs of Loyds in action in Normandy, and a number were photographed destroyed in the well-known battle of Villers-Bocage in 1944.

The Loyd Carrier was also paired with Caterpillar D8 tractors in service with Royal Electrical and Mechanical Engineers for tank recovery - the Carrier carrying spare equipment for the tractor.

=== Post-war ===
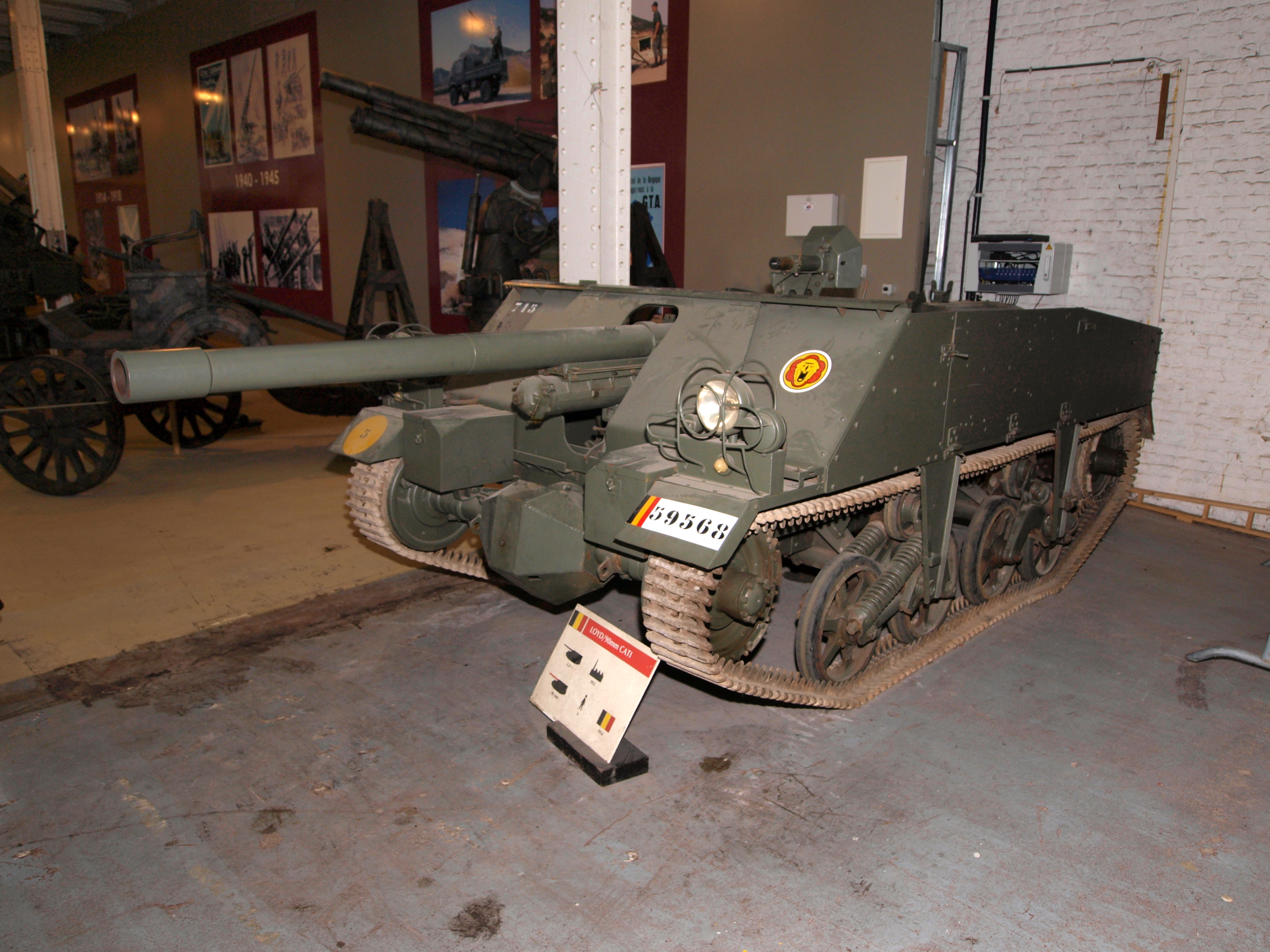
A Belgian CATI 90 displayed at the Royal Military Museum Brussels

Both Belgium and the Netherlands bought Loyd TTs from the British Army; they were still in Belgian Army ownership up to at least 1963 as engine rebuild plates have been seen with this date in original Belgian vehicles.

A Belgian variant was the CATI 90 (Canon antitank d'infanterie automoteur 90mm), a self-propelled gun in use from 1954 to 1962. The vehicle served in infantry units with a paired ammunition carrier.

Some vehicles were sold on into private ownership for farming use. A 1941 No1Mk1 TPC with a ploughing conversion still exists in Nottinghamshire, UK. A number were placed as targets on Belgian ranges.

== Variants ==
Loyd carriers were available in three "numbers", which were available in two "marks"; all manufactured during wartime, and varied in the type/sourcing of the Ford V8 sidevalve engine they were powered by:

- No. 1 - British Ford V8 engine (21 stud) and gearbox
- No. 2 - US Ford V8 engine (24 stud) and gearbox
- No. 3 - Ford Canada V8 engine (24 stud) and gearbox

The two marks were:

- Mark I - Bendix brake system
- Mark II - Girling brake system

=== Roles ===
There were not many differences between variants, mainly seating and armour plate location:

Tracked Personnel Carrier (TPC)
Equipped with a front bench seat and seating for troops on the track guards. Frontal and full side armour fitted.

Tracked Towing (TT) - Initially known as 'Tractor Anti-tank, MkI'
Equipped with four single seats and ammunition stowage on the track guards. Used for towing 4.2 inch mortars, or 2 pounder or 6 pounder anti-tank guns and carrying their crews. Frontal and front quarter armour fitted. The main variant by number manufactured.

Tracked Cable Layer Mechanical (TCLM)
A vehicle for Royal Corps of Signals work. No armour fitted.

Tracked Starting and Charging (TS&C)
Equipped with a front bench seat, 30 volt and 12 volt DC generators driven from the gearbox layshaft and battery sets to support armoured regiment tanks. No armour fitted.
