= M2 4.2-inch mortar =

American mortar

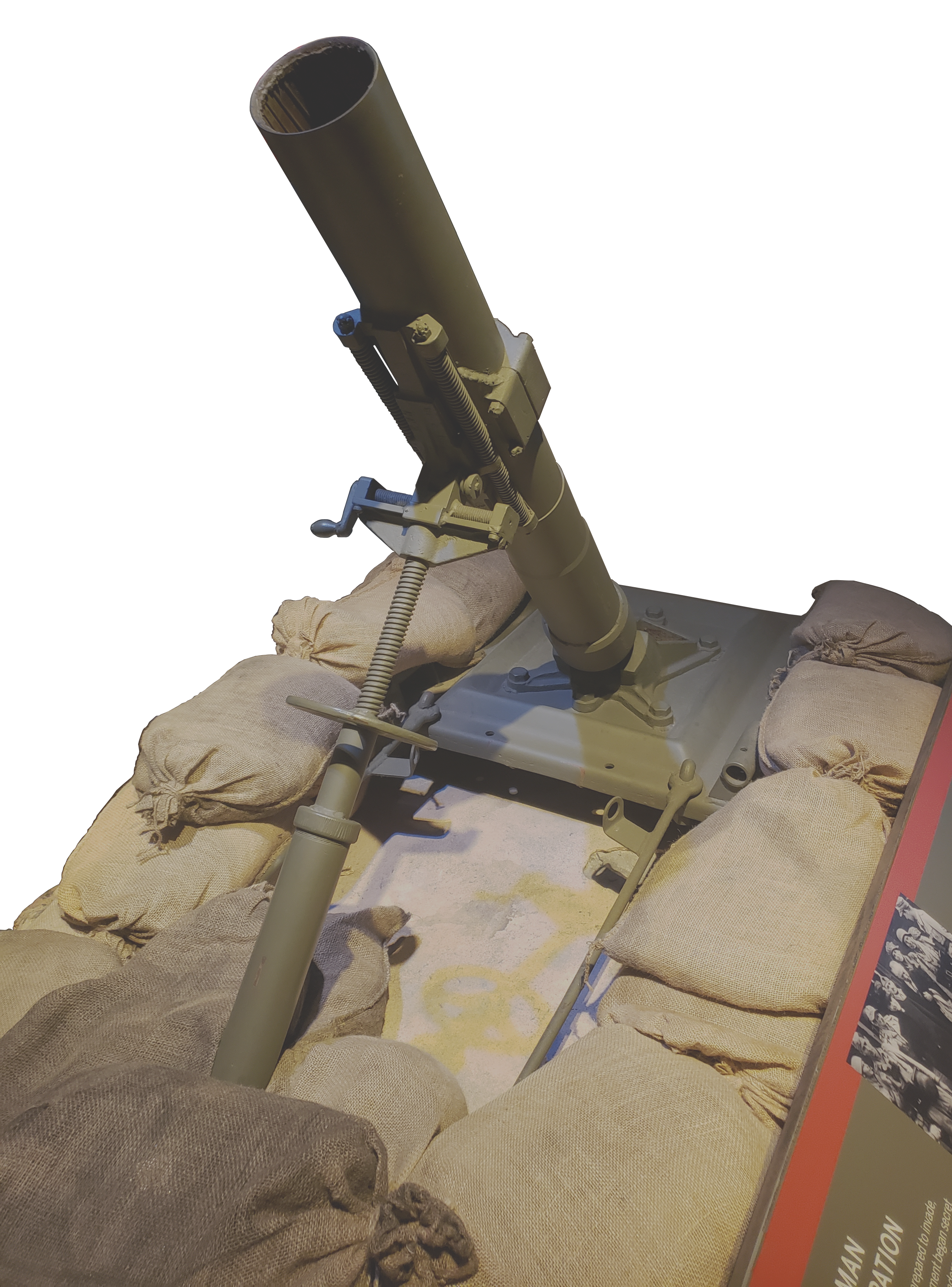
- Type: Mortar
- Place of origin: United States

Service history
- In service: 1943–1974 (United States); 1943–present
- Used by: U.S. Army; U.S. Marine Corps
- Wars: World War II; Korean War; First Indochina War; Vietnam War; Cambodian Civil War; Laotian Civil War; Portuguese Colonial War

Production history
- Designer: U.S. Chemical Warfare Service

Specifications
- Mass: 151 kg (332.89 lbs)
- Length: 1.22 m (4 ft)
- Barrel length: 1 m (3 ft 3 in)
- Shell: 11–13 kg (24 lb 4 oz – 28 lb 11 oz)
- Caliber: 107 mm (4.2 in)
- Rate of fire: 5 rpm for 20 minutes 1 rpm indefinitely
- Muzzle velocity: 250–256 m/s (820–840 ft/s)
- Effective firing range: 515 m (563.21 yd)
- Maximum firing range: 4.4 km (2.7 mi)

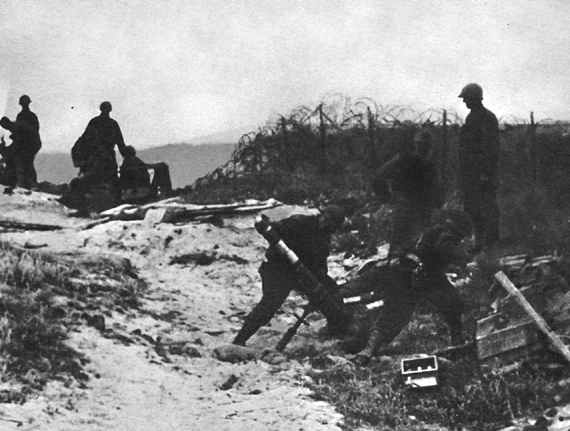
M2 4.2-inch mortars in action on Utah Beach, 1944

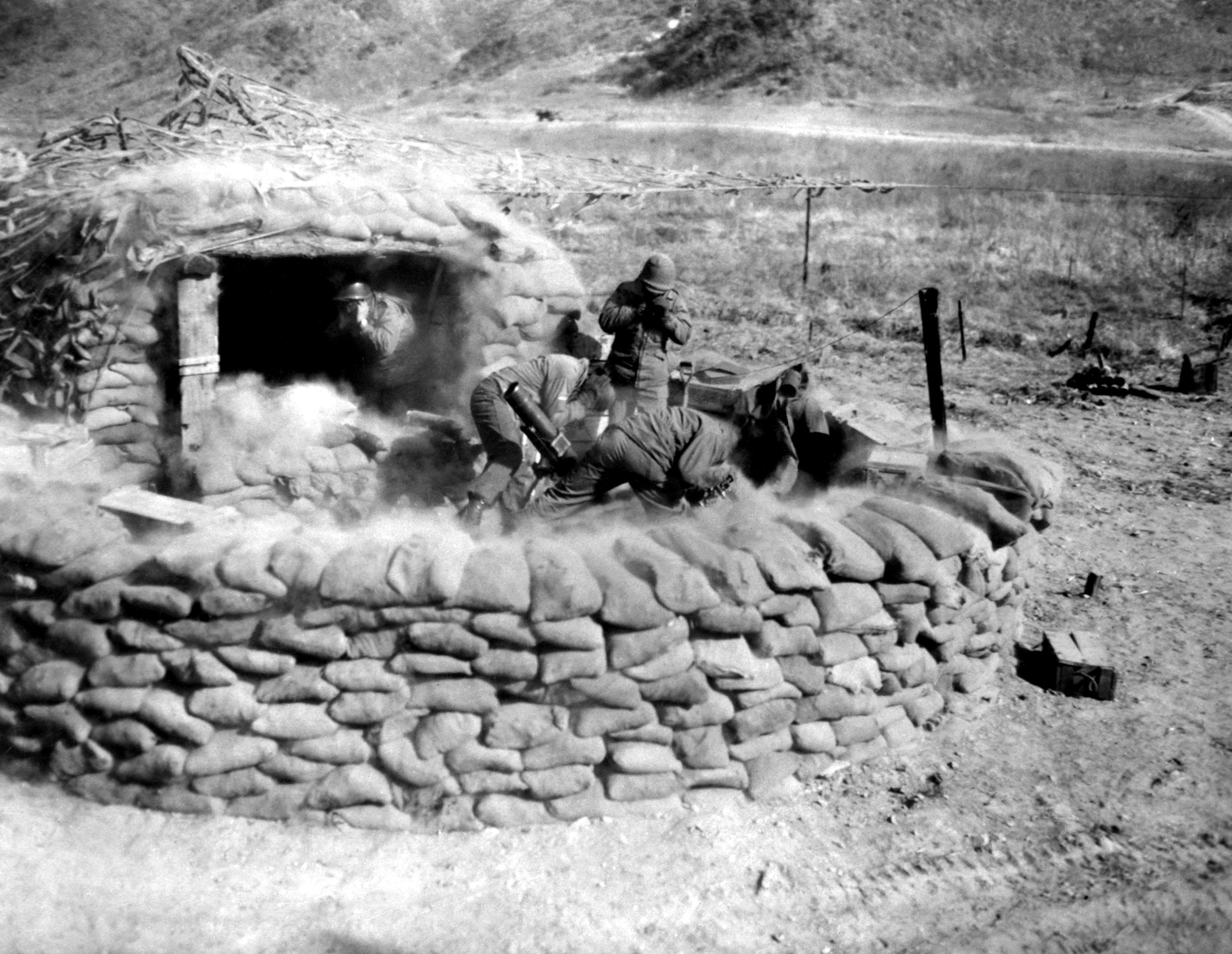
A crew of an M2 mortar fires on North Korean positions in 1953

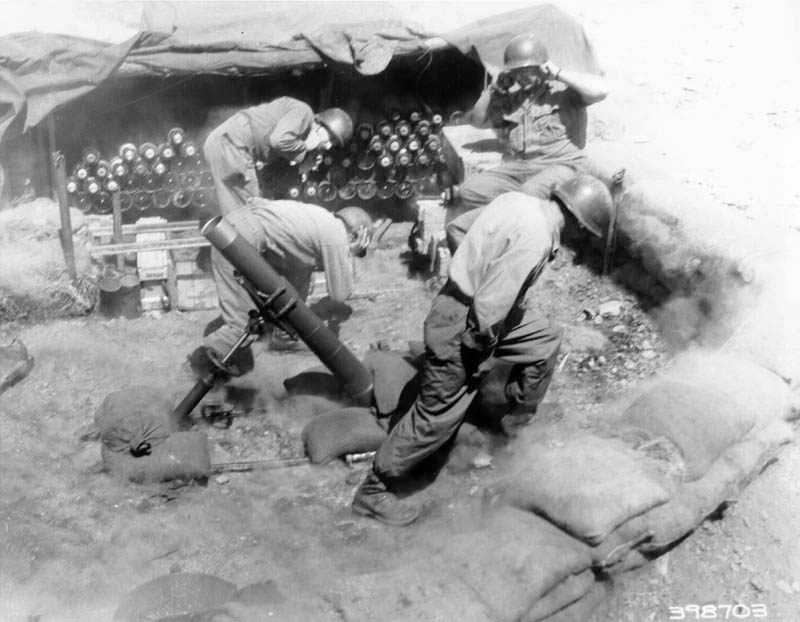
A 4.2-inch mortar in Korea, 1952.

The M2 4.2-inch mortar was a U.S. rifled 4.2-inch (107 mm) mortar used during the Second World War, the Korean War, and the Vietnam War. It entered service in 1943. It was nicknamed the "Goon Gun" (from its large bullet-shaped shells, monopod, and rifled bore) or the "Four-Deuce" (from its bore size in inches). In 1951, it began to be phased out in favor of the M30 mortar of the same caliber.

== History ==
The first 4.2 in (110 mm) mortar in U.S. service was introduced in 1928 and was designated the M1 Chemical Mortar. Development began in 1924 from the British 4-inch (102 mm) Mk I smooth-bore mortar. The addition of rifling increased the caliber to 4.2 in (110 mm). The M1 fired chemical shells to a range of 2,400 yards (2,200 m). It was ostensibly meant to fire only smoke shells, as the postwar peace lobby opposed military spending on explosive or poison gas shells. (Note: At the outset of World War II, authorized toxic fillings for American mortar shells were Mustard, Lewisite, Phosgene, CNB (a solution of Chloroacetophenone in Benzene and Carbon tetrachloride) and CNS (a solution of Chloroacetophenone and Chloropicrin in Chloroform). Later, Cyanogen chloride was added to this list. Some measure of the U.S. Chemical Warfare Service's opinion of the relative value of different toxic agents for gas shoots may be gauged from the number of shells filled with various agents from 1940 to 1946: 540,746 contained mustard, 49,402 phosgene, 41,353 CNS, 12,957 CNB, and 175 lewisite.) (Note: Thermite and other incendiary rounds could also be fired.)

The M2 could be disassembled into three parts to allow it to be carried by its crew. The mortar tube weighed 105 pounds (48 kg), including a screw-in cap at the bottom. The cap contained a built-in fixed firing pin. The standard, a recoiling hydraulic monopod that could be adjusted for elevation, weighed 53 pounds (24 kg). The baseplate had long handles on either side to make it easier to carry; it weighed 175 pounds (79 kg).

Upon the entry of the United States into World War II, the U.S. Army decided to develop a high explosive round for the mortar so that it could be used in a fragmentation role against enemy personnel. (Note: Experimentation along this line had first begun in 1934.) In order to extend the range to 3,200 yards (2,900 m), more propellant charge was used and parts of the mortar were strengthened. Eventually, the range of the mortar was extended to 4,400 yards (4,000 m). The modified mortar was redesignated the M2. The M2 was first used in the Sicilian Campaign, where some 35,000 rounds of ammunition were fired from the new weapon. Subsequently, the mortar proved to be an especially useful weapon in areas of rough terrain such as mountains and jungle, into which artillery pieces could not be moved. The M2 was gradually replaced in U.S. service from 1951 by the M30 mortar.

Starting in December 1942, the US Army experimented with self-propelled 4.2 in (110 mm) mortar carriers. Two pilot vehicles based on the M3A1 halftrack were built, designated 4.2 in (110 mm) Mortar Carriers T21 and T21E1. (Note: The CWC already had the T81 Chemical Mortar Motor Carriage, based on the M5A1, in service.) The program was cancelled in 1945.

Before the invasion of Peleliu in September, 1944, the U.S. Navy mounted three mortars each on the decks of four Landing Craft Infantry and designated them LCI(M). They provided useful fire support in situations where conventional naval gunfire, with its flat trajectory, was not effective. Increased numbers of LCI(M) were used in the invasions of the Philippines and Iwo Jima. Sixty LCI(M) were used during the invasion of Okinawa and adjoining islands with Navy personnel operating the mortars.

== Tactical organization ==
4.2 in (110 mm) mortars were employed by chemical mortar battalions. Each battalion was authorized forty-eight M2 4.2 in (110 mm) mortars organized into four companies with three four-tube platoons. Between December 1944 and February 1945, the battalions’ Companies D were inactivated to organize additional battalions. In World War II, an infantry division was often supported by one or two chemical mortar companies with twelve mortars each. In some instances an entire battalion was attached to a division. In the Korean War, an organic heavy mortar company of eight 4.2 in (110 mm) mortars was assigned each infantry regiment while Marine regiments had a mortar company with twelve mortars.

== Ammunition ==
The M2 has a rifled barrel, unusual for a mortar. Thus its ammunition lacks stabilizing tailfins common to most mortars.

The mortar's M3 high explosive (HE) shell packed 3.64 kg (8.0 lb) of explosive charge, placing it between the M1 105-mm HE shell (2.18 kg (4.8 lb) of charge) and M102 155-mm HE shell (6.88 kg (15.2 lb) of charge) in terms of blast effect. The mortar could also fire white phosphorus-based smoke shells and mustard gas shells. The official designation of the latter was Cartridge, Mortar, 4.2-inch. Mustard gas was not used in these wars and the U.S. ended up with a large number of these shells, declaring over 450,000 of them in stockpile in 1997 when the Chemical Weapons Treaty came into force. Destruction efforts to eliminate this stockpile are continuing with a few of these aged shells occasionally found to be leaking.

Available ammunition
Type	Model	Weight	Filler	Muzzle velocity	Range
HE	HE M3 Shell	11.11 kg (24.5 lb)	TNT, 3.64 kg (8.0 lb)	256 m/s (840 ft/s)	4 km (2.5 mi)
Smoke	WP M2 Shell	11.57 kg (25.5 lb)	White phosphorus (WP)	250 m/s (820 ft/s)	3.9 km (2.4 mi)
Chemical	H M2 Shell	13 kg (29 lb)	HD, 2.7 kg (6.0 lb) or HT, 2.6 kg (5.7 lb)	256 m/s (840 ft/s)	4.4 km (2.7 mi)

== Users ==
- Austria: used as of 1984
- Brazil: used as of 1984
- Belgium: used as of 1984
- Bolivia: used as of 1984
- Cambodia: used as of 1984
- Republic of China (1912-1949): used in the Burma campaign
- Colombia: used as of 1984
- Cyprus: used as of 1984
- Ethiopia: used as of 1984
- France
- Greece: used as of 1984
- Guatemala: used as of 1984
- Japan: used as of 1984 All M2s were replaced by MO-120-RT by 2010.
- Laos: used as of 1984
- North Vietnam
- Panama Used by the Panama Defense Forces
- Paraguay: used as of 1984
- Philippines: used as of 1984
- Portugal: known as m/951
- Republic of Korea: The Armed Forces began receiving M2s after the outbreak of the Korean War, and 254 were in service by the end of the war. Replaced with M30 or KM30 in 1970s.
- South Vietnam
- Tunisia: used as of 1984
- Turkey: used as of 1984

== See also ==
Weapons of comparable role, performance and era

- ML 4.2-inch mortar – British mortar.
- 107mm M1938 mortar – Soviet mortar.
