= ML 4.2-inch mortar =

WW2 British mortar

Ordnance ML 4.2-inch mortar
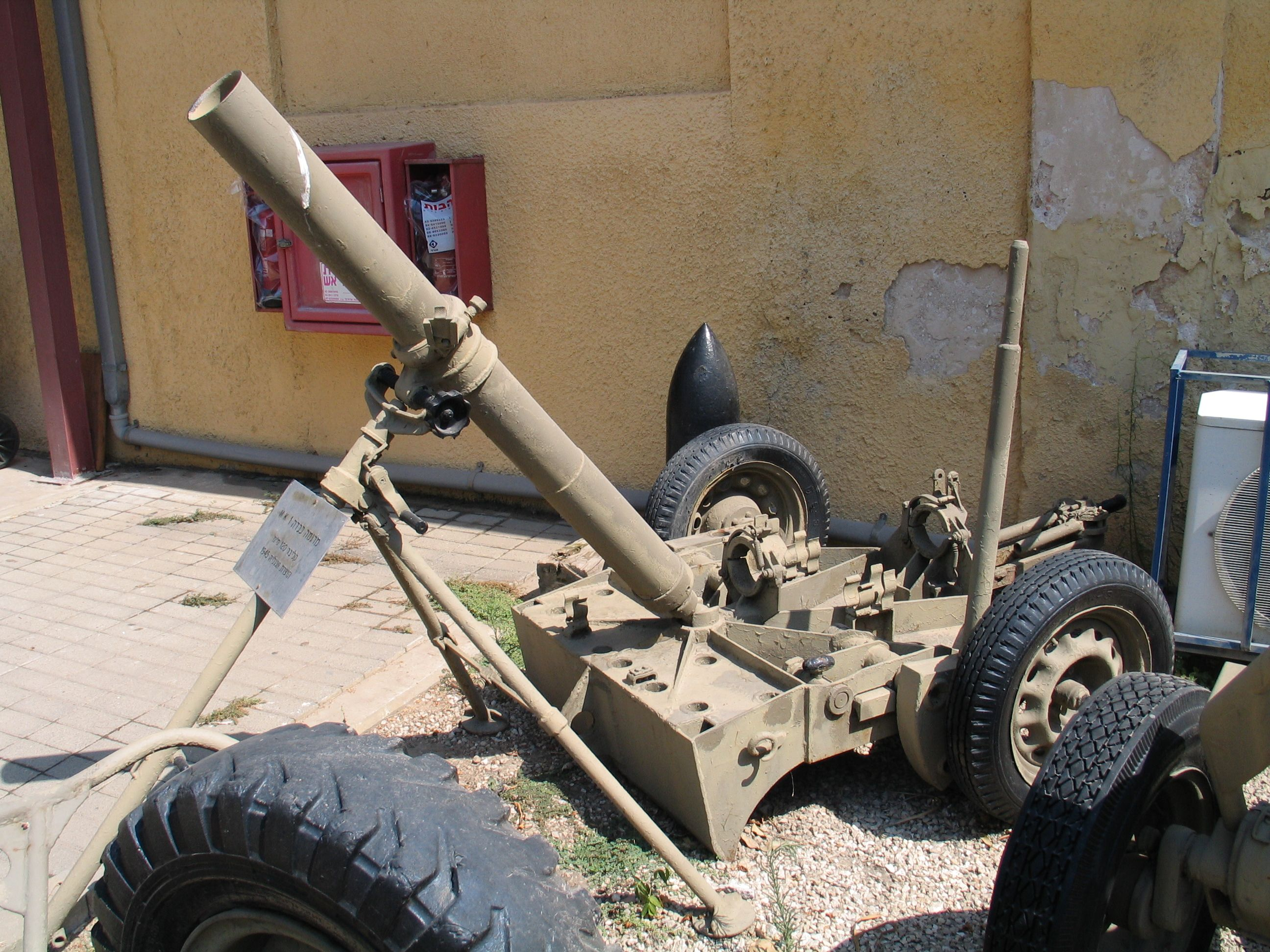
- Ordnance ML 4.2-inch mortar on mobile base plate
- Type: Mortar
- Place of origin: United Kingdom

Service history
- In service: 1942–1966 (United Kingdom); 1942–present
- Wars: Second World War; Korean War; Indonesia–Malaysia confrontation Indo-Pakistani War of 1965

Production history
- No. built: c. 3,800

Specifications
- Mass: Mk 2 Barrel: 92 lb (42 kg); Tripod: 112 lb (51 kg); No 2 baseplate: 120 lb (54 kg); Auxiliary baseplate: 318 lb (144 kg); Mobile baseplate: 602 lb (273 kg)
- Barrel length: Mk 1: 64 in (1.6 m); Mk 2: 68 in (1.7 m)
- Shell weight: 19 lb 13 oz (9 kg)
- Calibre: 4.2 in (107 mm)
- Elevation: 45°–80°
- Traverse: 10°
- Rate of fire: 20 for 1 minute 15 for 3 minutes 10 rpm sustained
- Muzzle velocity: 730 ft/s (223 m/s)
- Maximum firing range: 4,100 yd (3,700 m)

The Ordnance ML 4.2-inch mortar was a heavy mortar used by the British Army during and after World War II.

== History ==
The 4.2 in (110 mm) mortar was a smooth-bore weapon of the Stokes mortar pattern and was designed by the Armaments Research and Development Establishment and produced by the Royal Ordnance Factories. It entered widespread British service in 1942, equipping chemical warfare companies of the Royal Engineers (RE). The Mark 3 became the standard model.

The first combat use was at Second Battle of El Alamein, when the 66th Mortar Company (RE) was attached to the Australian 24th Infantry Brigade. During the battle, the mortar company provided intense, effective supporting fire on the 24th Brigade's exposed right flank, as the infantry advanced, expending all of the 4.2 in (110 mm) HE mortar ammunition in the theatre.

Around mid-1943, the Royal Engineer chemical warfare companies were disbanded as an expedient and one heavy mortar company of each infantry division machine-gun battalion was equipped with the mortar. This company was organized with sixteen 4.2 in (110 mm) mortars, in four platoons of four mortars each. In early 1944, divisions in Italy also held a pool of mortars for issue to other units as needed, usually troops in the divisional anti-tank regiment, some regiments even converted one or more batteries to mortars.

Ordnance ML 4.2 in (110 mm) mortars were slower to reach Commonwealth forces in the Pacific and Asia. Australian Army units in the South West Pacific theatre were reportedly the first to receive them, before forces in Burma.

=== Postwar ===
After World War II, the mortars were handed over to the Royal Artillery, the 170th Mortar Battery used them at the Battle of Imjin River in Korea. They were used during the 1950s, also by airborne artillery, deployed to Kuwait in 1961 and manned by soldiers from air defence batteries during the Confrontation in Borneo in 1965. The Ceylon Army used them during the 1971 Insurrection until it was replaced by Soviet 82-BM-37 82 mm mortars. Reserve stocks of 4.2 in (110 mm) mortar bombs were used by the Sri Lanka Air Force to drop from helicopters during the early stages of Sri Lankan civil war.

== Description ==
The 4.2 in (110 mm) mortar entered production at the end of 1941 with a standard base plate and tripod. The normal detachment was six men and it was transported with ammunition in a 10 cwt [1,120 lb (510 kg)] trailer, usually towed behind a Loyd Carrier. There was also an auxiliary base plate that fitted around it, to increase its area for use on softer ground. Later an integrated trailer–base plate was developed, called the Mk 1 Mobile Baseplate. The wheels, which were on suspension arms, were unlocked and raised for firing; the Mk1/1 had detachable wheels and the barrel with tripod attached, was stowed on top for towing. The mobile base plate trailer mounting could be brought into action by two men. A source reports a crew putting 23 bombs in the air before the first one landed.

== Ammunition ==
HE [9.1 kg (20 lb)] and smoke [10.2 kg (22 lb)] ammunition was used. Smoke included WP and Base Ejection, and in World War II other types for practice. Two charges were available. In World War II, both streamlined and cylindrical bombs were available. Chemical munitions included the MK I chemical mortar bomb with Mustard gas (HS or HT fillings).

== Users ==
World War II

- Australia
- New Zealand
- United Kingdom

Postwar

- Australia
- Canada
- Ethiopia
- Greece
- India
- Laos
- Malaysia
- New Zealand
- Nepal
- Sri Lanka
- Turkey
- United Kingdom
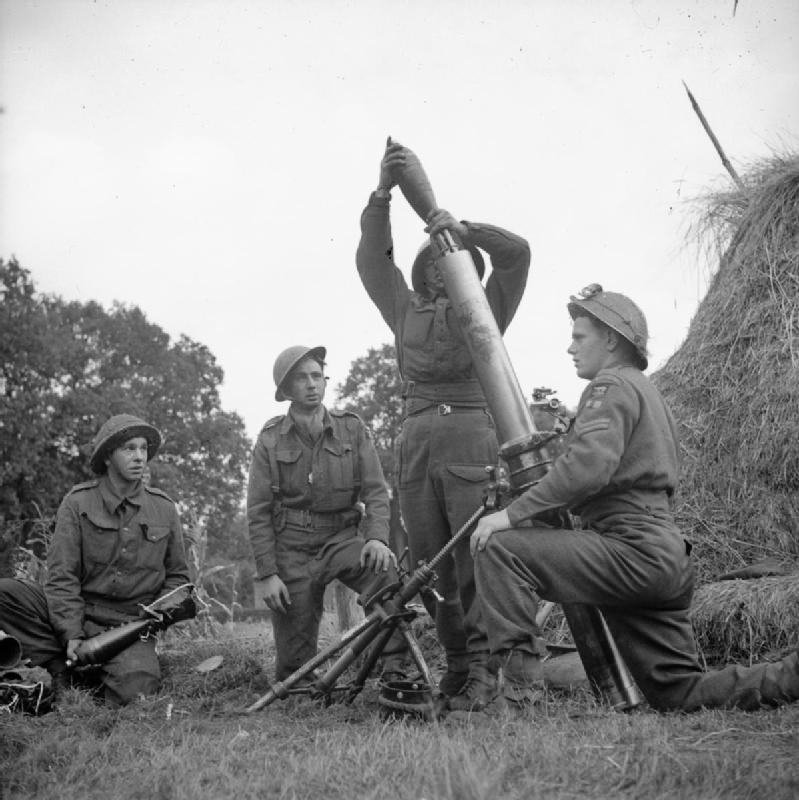

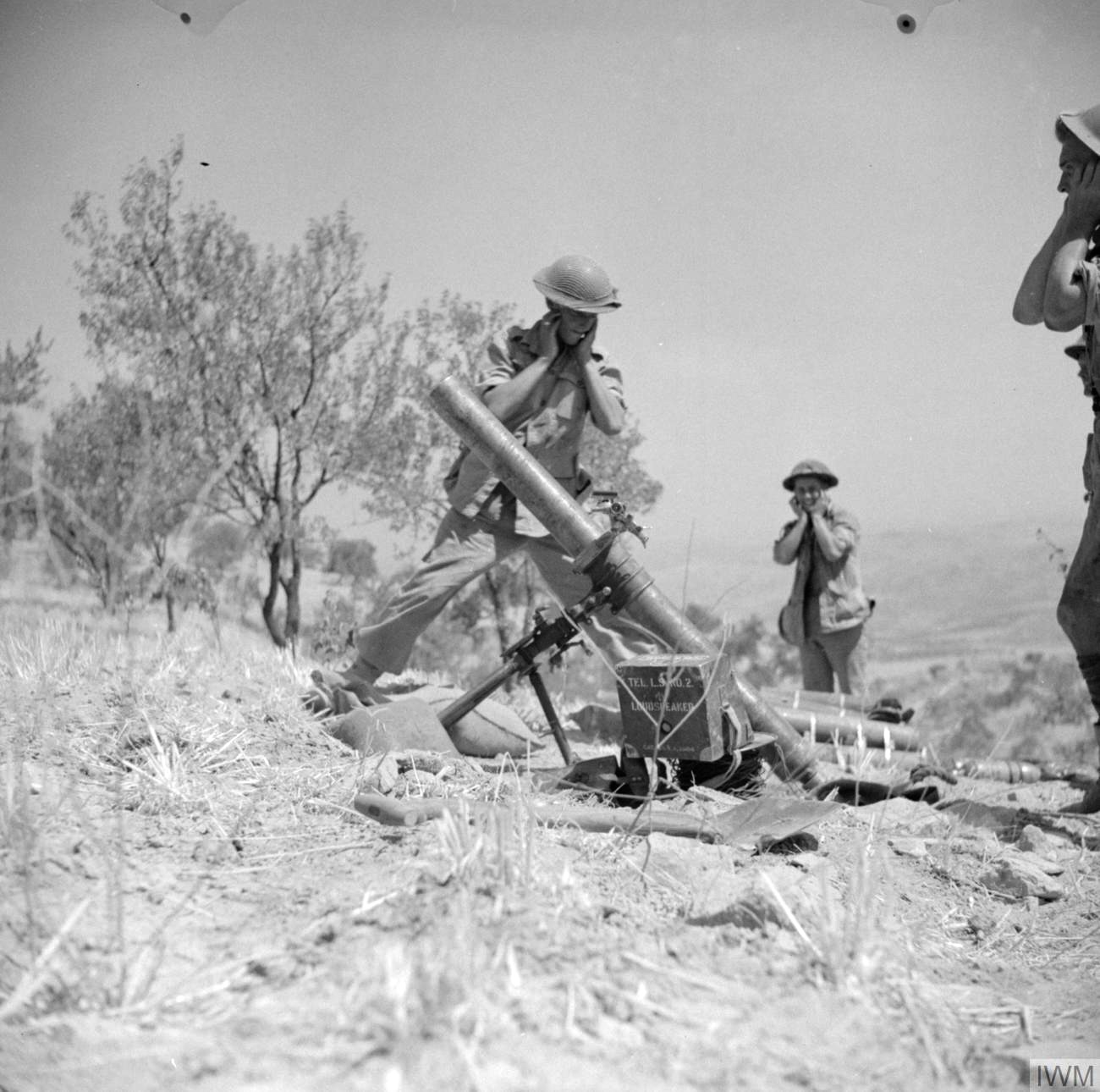

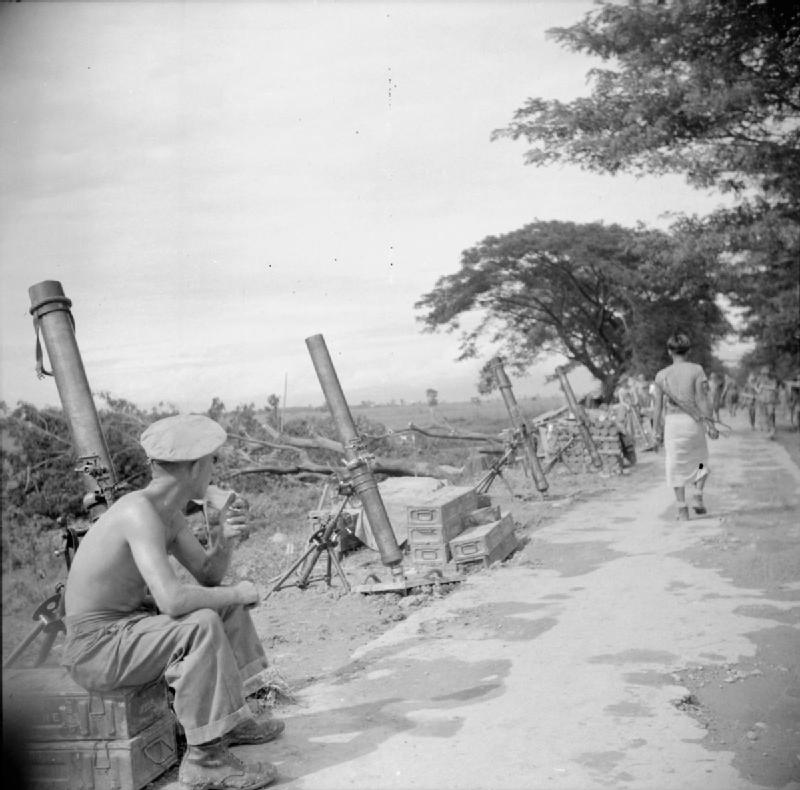

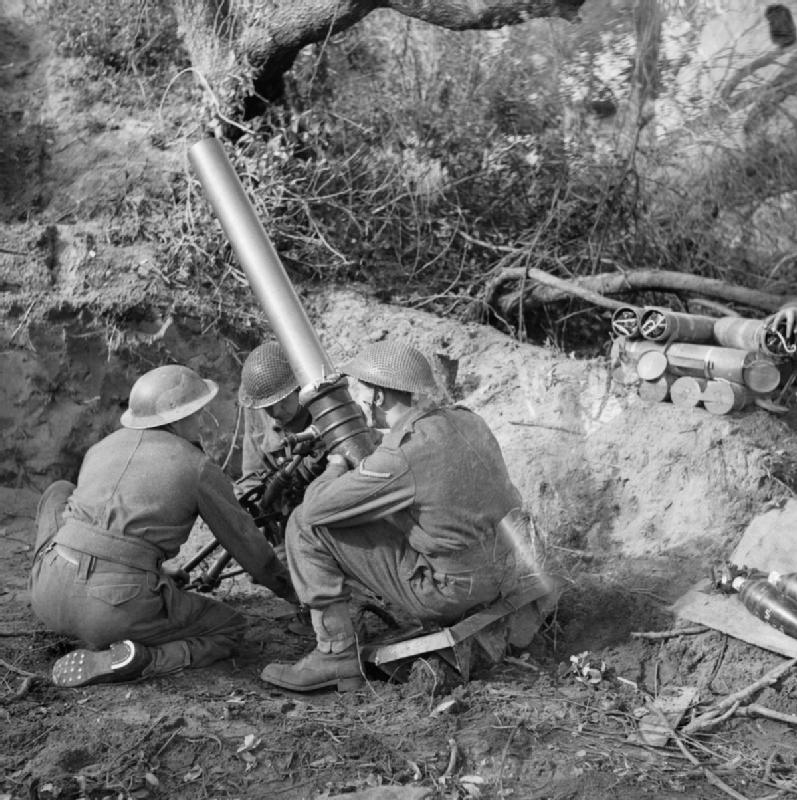

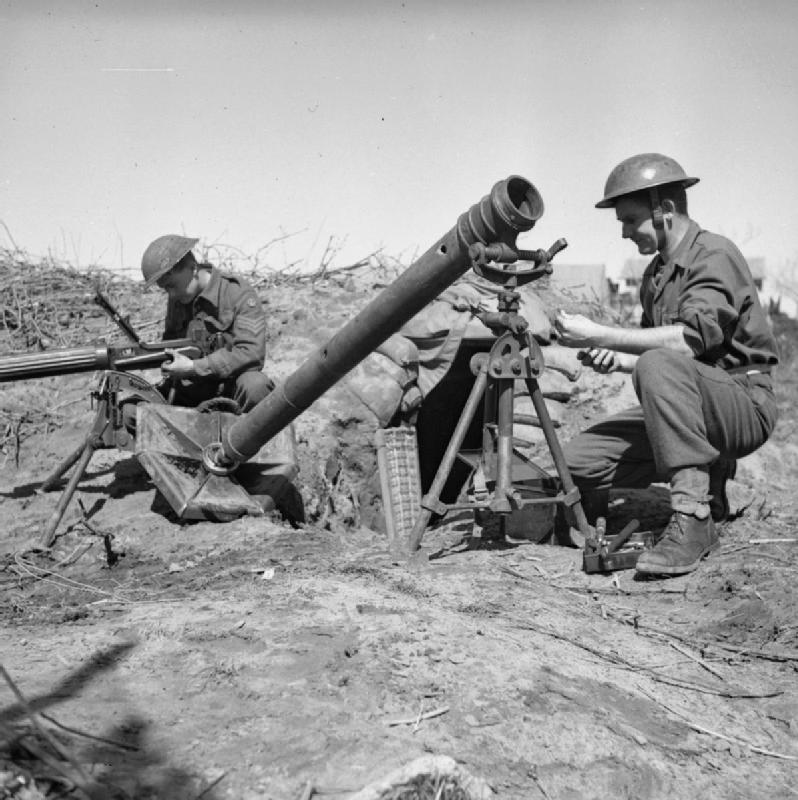

== See also ==
=== Weapons of comparable role, performance and era ===
- M2 4.2 inch mortar – US equivalent
- 107mm M1938 mortar – Soviet equivalent
