= Sidney Horstmann =

British engineer and businessman

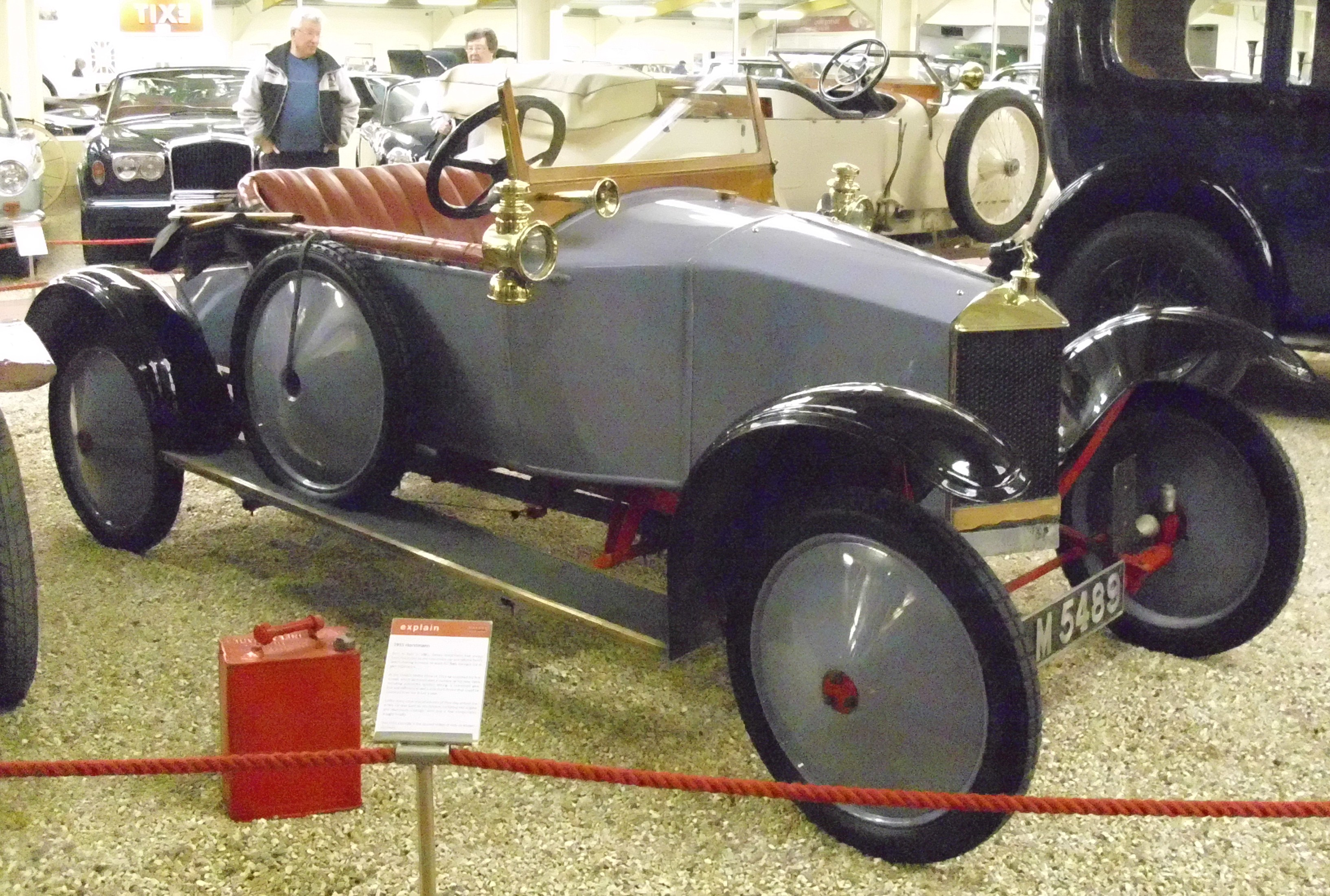
A 1915 Horstmann car

Sidney Adolph Horstmann, MBE (7 July 1881 – 11 July 1962) was a British engineer and businessman.

== Early life ==
Sidney was the youngest son of the German clockmaker Gustav Horstmann, who moved to England about 1850. Gustav designed the world's first micrometer with an accuracy greater than 1/10000 of an inch. Sidney was born in Bath.

== Horstmann Gear ==
In 1904, Horstmann and his brothers founded Horstmann Gear to produce a variable speed gearbox he had invented for cars and motorcycles. The firm later became a general engineering company and came to specialise in gas street lighting controls, time switches, gauges, and latterly central heating controls. They also worked with William Friese-Greene in the development of the first cameras for moving celluloid film.

In 1915 a large factory, Newbridge Works, was opened in a former dance hall at Newbridge, Bath, and subsequently Newbridge was used as a trade mark.

In 1994 the Horstmann family sold their remaining shares in Horstmann Gear and Horstmann Group became part of Clayhithe plc, which in 1998 was acquired by Roxspur plc. The factory was moved from Newbridge to Bristol in 2000. In 2001 the company became Horstmann Controls.

== Horstmann Cars ==
In 1913, Horstmann founded an automotive company, Horstmann Cars, which was later renamed to Horstman Cars. Car production ceased in 1929, by which time 1,500 or 3,000 cars had been made.

He was responsible for developing a tracked coil spring suspension system known as the Horstmann bogie, which is used on many Western (particularly British) tanks, including the Centurion and Chieftain. He patented this system in 1922, some nine years prior to Dr. Ferdinand Porsche's similar system which was featured in many German tanks in the Second World War. The suspension company eventually became Horstman Defence Systems which (as of 2018) retains a site in Bath.

== Hadrill and Horstmann ==
After the Second World War, Horstmann formed a new electrical engineering company Hadrill and Horstmann Ltd, with G. C. T. Hadrill, who had owned Gartheiniog slate quarry. They were best known for the Counterpoise lamps they produced, which are now collectors' items. The company was acquired in 1955 by Simms Group, which also acquired Horstman Ltd. In 2019 the Horstman Holding Ltd. was acquired by Renk.

== Awards ==
Horstmann was appointed a Member of the Order of the British Empire in the 1919 New Year Honours, in his role as managing director of Horstmann Cars Limited.
