= Gun truck =

Armored vehicle with a crew-served weapon

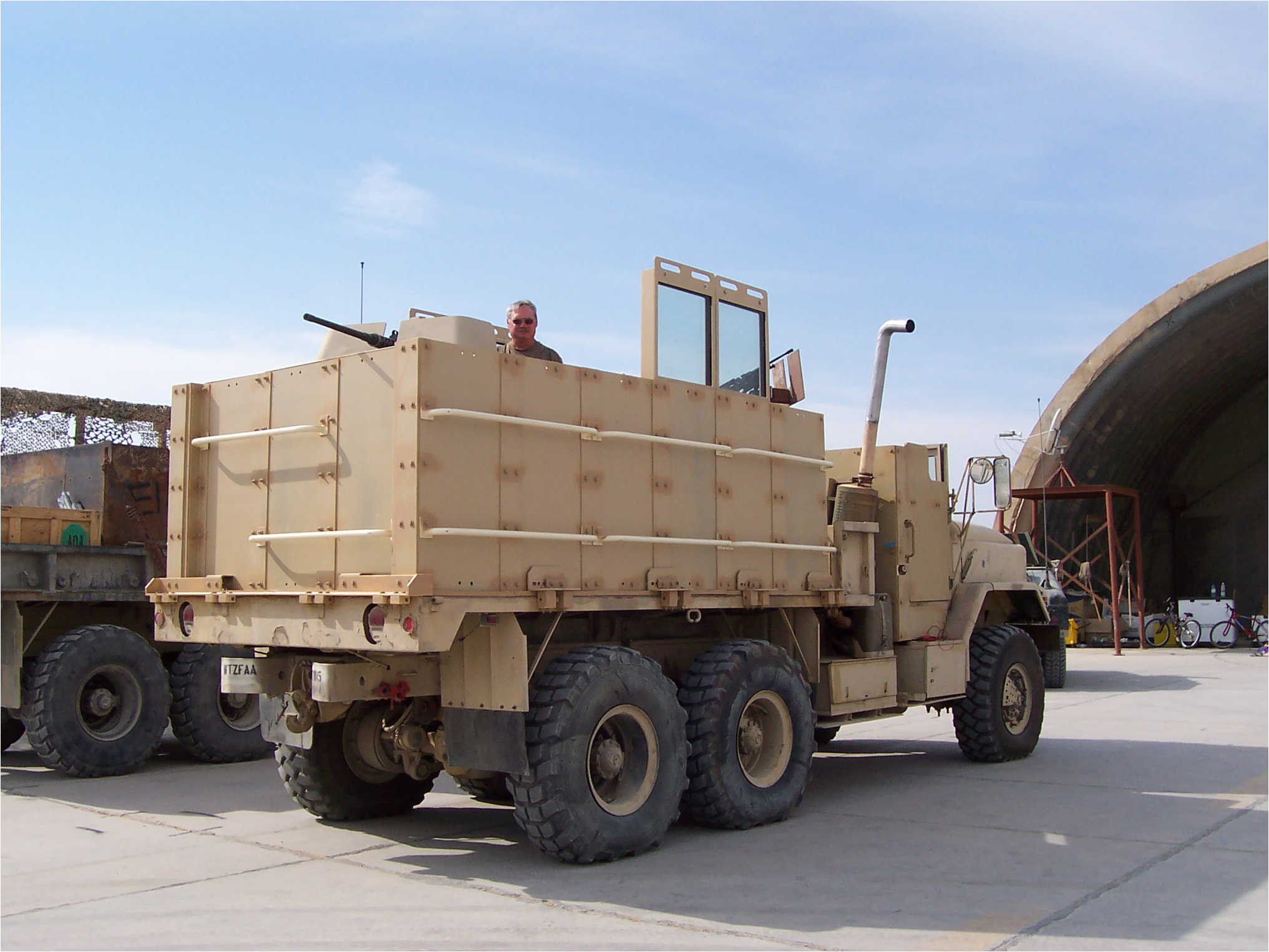
A gun truck of the type used in Iraq, based on an M939 five-ton truck

A gun truck is an armored vehicle with one or more crew-served weapons, typically based on a military truck. Gun trucks often have improvised vehicle armor, such as scrap metal, concrete, gravel, or sandbags, which is added to a heavy truck.

== World War II ==
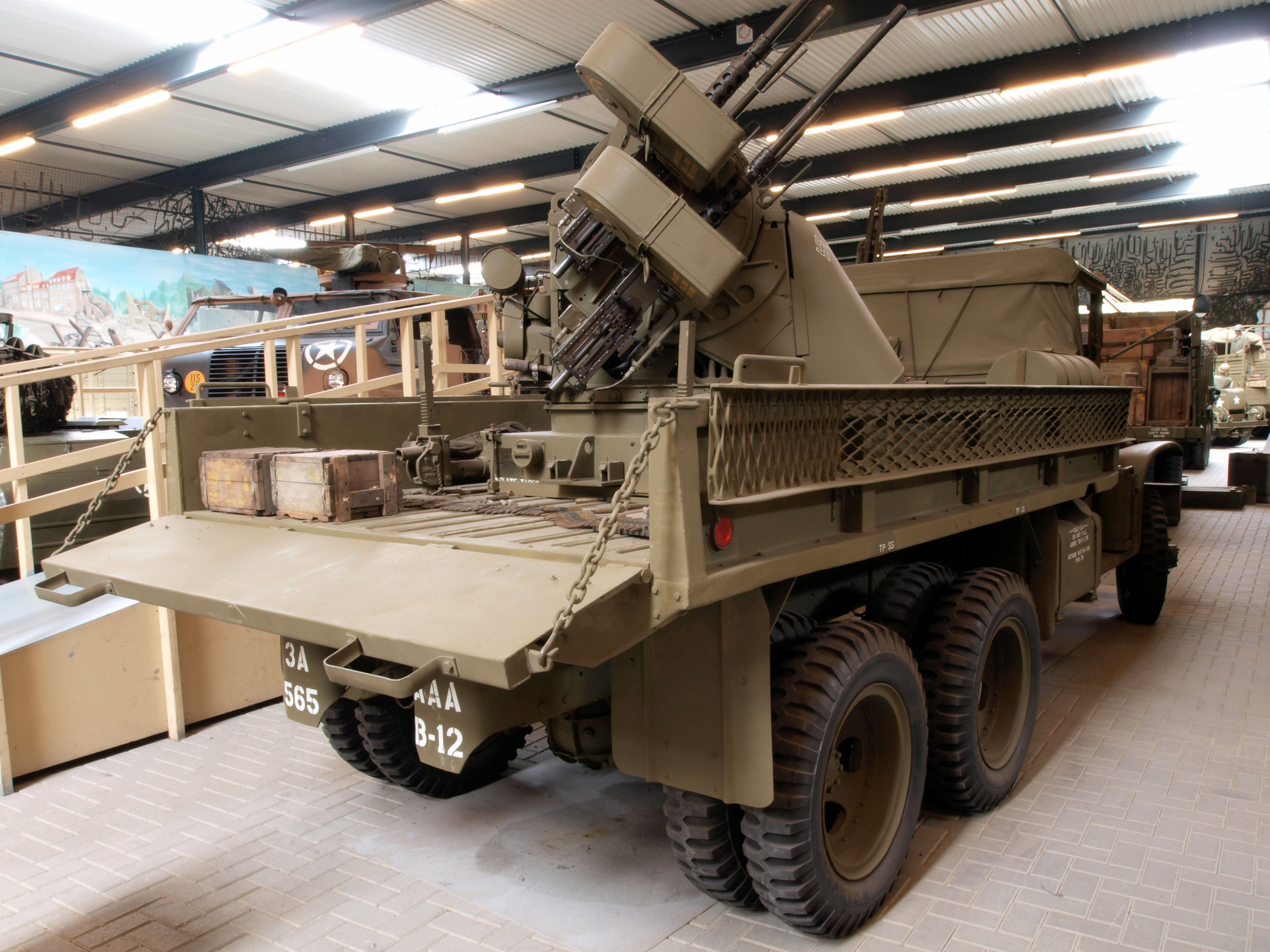
US Army gun truck, with a Quadmount on the back of a CCKW. Note the loading ramps on both sides of the truck.

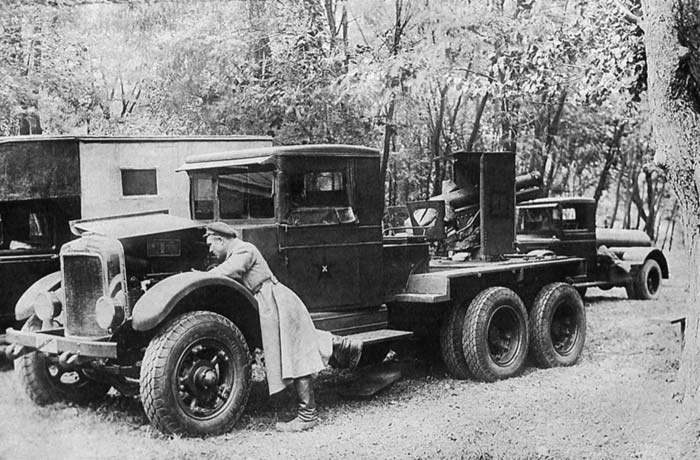
Soviet SU-12 self-propelled gun, designed in 1933.

When the prospect of a German invasion of Britain seemed likely, the British Army designed and built an improvised armored vehicle, the Bedford OXA. It was based on the one and a half-ton OXD truck and was upgraded with armor plate, and armed with a .55 in anti-tank rifle and a Bren gun. Slightly less than a thousand were built by 1941, and they were employed by the British Home Guard.

Other British examples from the invasion-scare period were the Armadillo armoured fighting vehicle and the Bison concrete armoured lorries. Both were conventional trucks fitted with improvised armour, in the case of the Bison, a concrete fighting-compartment was carried, essentially making a mobile pillbox. The Armadillo used two walls of wood, with the space between filled with gravel. Both vehicles had poor mobility and were employed for airfield defense by the Royal Air Force. In the event of a surprise, airborne attack, Bisons would deploy a short distance from the key points of the airfield and probably fight from static positions, positions where fixed defenses often could not be constructed as they would impede aircraft movement during day–to–day operations. The Armadillo's mobility, while poor, was better than the Bison's and it was intended they would take on a mobile role similar to a conventional armoured vehicle.

During the war in North Africa all contenders made extensive use of portees and gun trucks. In particular, the Italians adapted and used seven gun trucks based on heavy trucks Fiat 634 and equipped with an 102/35 su Fiat 634N anti-aircraft gun in 1941-1942; initially intended for anti-ship and anti-air defense, they proved to be very effective against British tanks. Another sixteen gun trucks, still between 1941 and 1942, were based on heavy trucks Lancia 3Ro mounting a 100/17 with full rotation in the back. In 1942 the 90/53 on Lancia 3Ro entered service, still based on the same truck as the previous one, but equipped with the excellent Cannone da 90/53, dual role high velocity gun; 30 were produced in 1942, another 90 were built on a different chassis as 90/53 on Breda 52. The 75/27 CK on Ceirano 50 CMA was instead already produced during the late 1920s to provide anti-aircraft support to the divisions, but by 1939 it was completely outdated, both in terms of mobility and firepower. In general these gun trucks proved to be quicker to position and open fire than normal artillery and they were valid if well hidden and protected, but the excessive height and mediocre mobility always remained major limitations. Numerous normal trucks such as the SPA Dovunque 35, the Fiat-SPA 38R and the SPA AS.37 were equipped with an autocannon Breda 20/65 mod.35 for the protection of convoys. Likewise, many captured enemy vehicles, for example the Ford F15A, were equipped with the same weapon. Another English vehicle, the light truck Morris CS8, was equipped with a 65/17 howitzer, about 30 were fitted. There were then numerous vehicles equipped with the 47/32 gun: the scout vehicles SPA-Viberti AS.42, the Fiat-SPA AS43 and the light truck SPA AS.37.

== Vietnam War ==
During the Vietnam War, it was the mission of the US Army Transportation Corps to ferry supplies from the coastal ports of Qui Nhon and Cam Ranh Bay to inland bases located at Bong Son, An Khe, Pleiku, Da Lat and Buon Ma Thuot. The logistical requirements of the MACV were huge, and 200-truck convoys were not uncommon. These convoys were tempting targets for Vietcong (VC) guerrilla groups, who often sprung ambushes in remote areas.

One unit that often fell victim to such attacks was the 8th Transportation Group, based in Qui Nhon. Two dangerous stretches of Route 19 between Qui Nhon and Pleiku became the VC's favorite kill zones, the "Devil's Hairpin" in An Khe Pass and "Ambush Alley" below Mang Yang Pass as incidents occurred there on an almost daily basis.

Providing security for convoys proved virtually impossible, as the Military Police units whose task it was did not have the manpower or equipment to secure the whole highway. Other military combat units only controlled the stretch of road within their designated checkpoints and could serve as a reaction force; so for much of the way, it fell onto the transport units to provide themselves immediate security. At first, they did this with armed jeeps, but these rapidly proved inadequate in the face of improved VC and North Vietnamese People's Army of Vietnam weaponry and tactics.

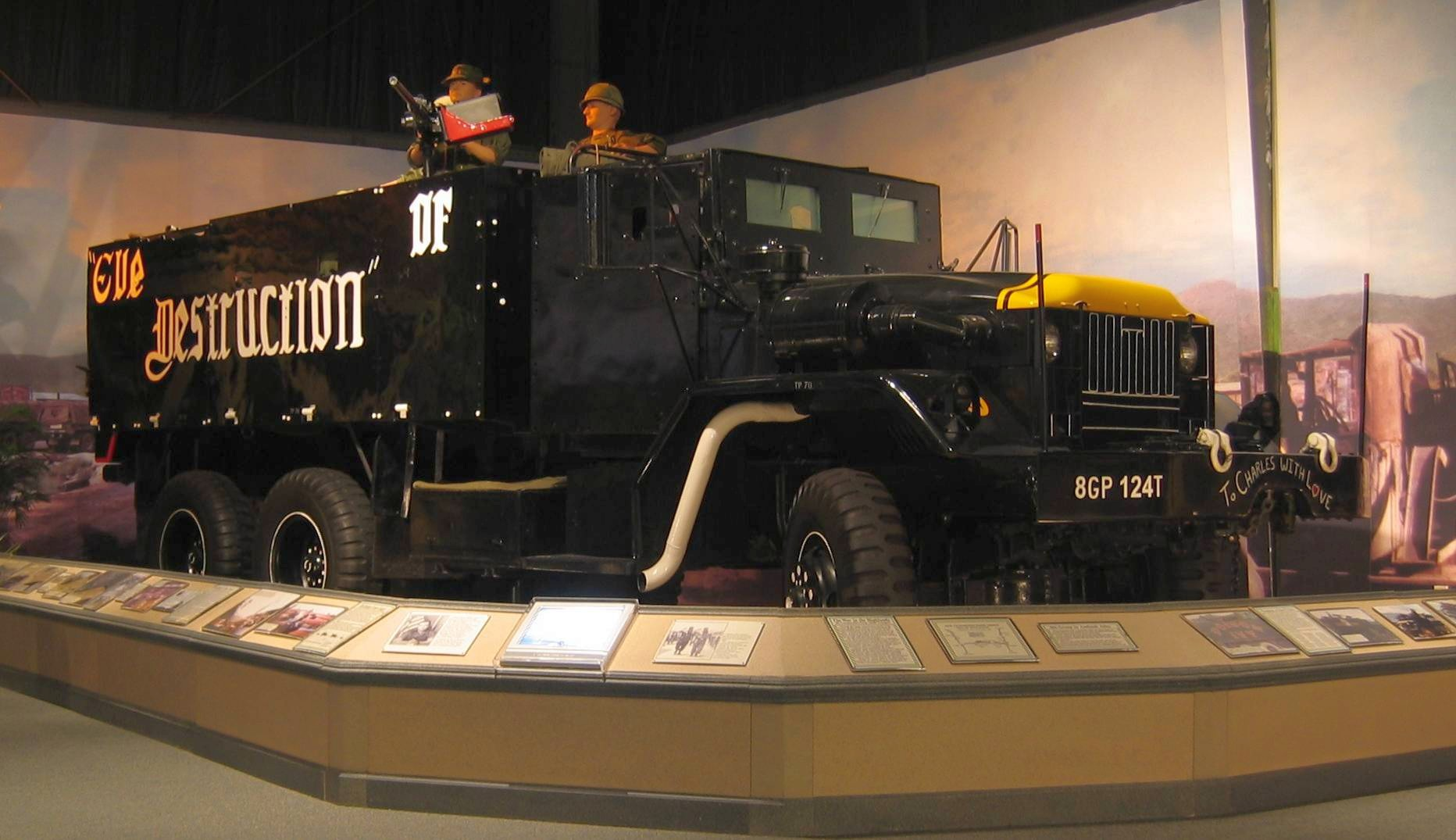
Eve of Destruction in the Army Transportation Museum at Fort Eustis

On September 2, 1967, a particularly devastating attack killed seven drivers, wounded 17 and destroyed or damaged 30 trucks. To remedy the obvious vulnerability of the supply convoys, a "hardened convoy" concept was implemented, protected by a new type of security vehicle. This gun truck, as it became known, was based on the two-and-a-half-ton cargo truck, protected by a barrier of sandbags, and armed with two M60 machine guns. Hardened convoys were smaller than previously, being composed of only 100 trucks, and their security detail was increased until there was one gun truck for every 10 transport trucks.

In the event of an ambush, their role was to drive into the kill zone during the first few minutes of the attack, and saturate the attackers with their firepower. Early designs proved flawed, as the sandbag protections quickly became waterlogged in the frequent rains, weighing down the whole vehicle. They were later replaced with ad hoc steel armor plating, salvaged from scrap yards. The crew consisted of a driver, two gunners, a non-commissioned officer in charge (NCOIC), and sometimes a grenadier armed with an M79 grenade launcher. In October 1968, the factory-made hardening kits arrived to replace the sandbag and wood gun trucks.

On November 24, 1967, during an engagement in "Ambush Alley", a group of gun trucks managed to thwart an ambush. The convoy lost six transport trucks and four gun trucks damaged or destroyed, and several drivers were killed and wounded, but the VC lost 41 killed and were forced to withdraw. This was the first ambush against gun trucks.

Despite the increased security, transportation units still came under attack, forcing the gun truck units to improve the design of their vehicles. The two-and-a-half-ton trucks were underpowered, and the addition of armor and weapons slowed them down, leading to their replacement by M39 series 5-ton 6×6 trucks that formed the basis for larger gun trucks. The improvised nature of these vehicles meant they varied considerably in appearance. They were given colourful nicknames such as "Ace of Spades", "Deuce is Wild", "Cold Sweat", "Iron Butterfly" or "Pandemonium" that were often painted on the sides in large letters.

Their armament consisted of various combinations of weapons including M60s, .50-calibre machine guns, and XM 134 miniguns. Anti-aircraft weapons such as the quadmount .50 cal. machine guns were also used until 1969 when the truck companies had three to six gun trucks each.

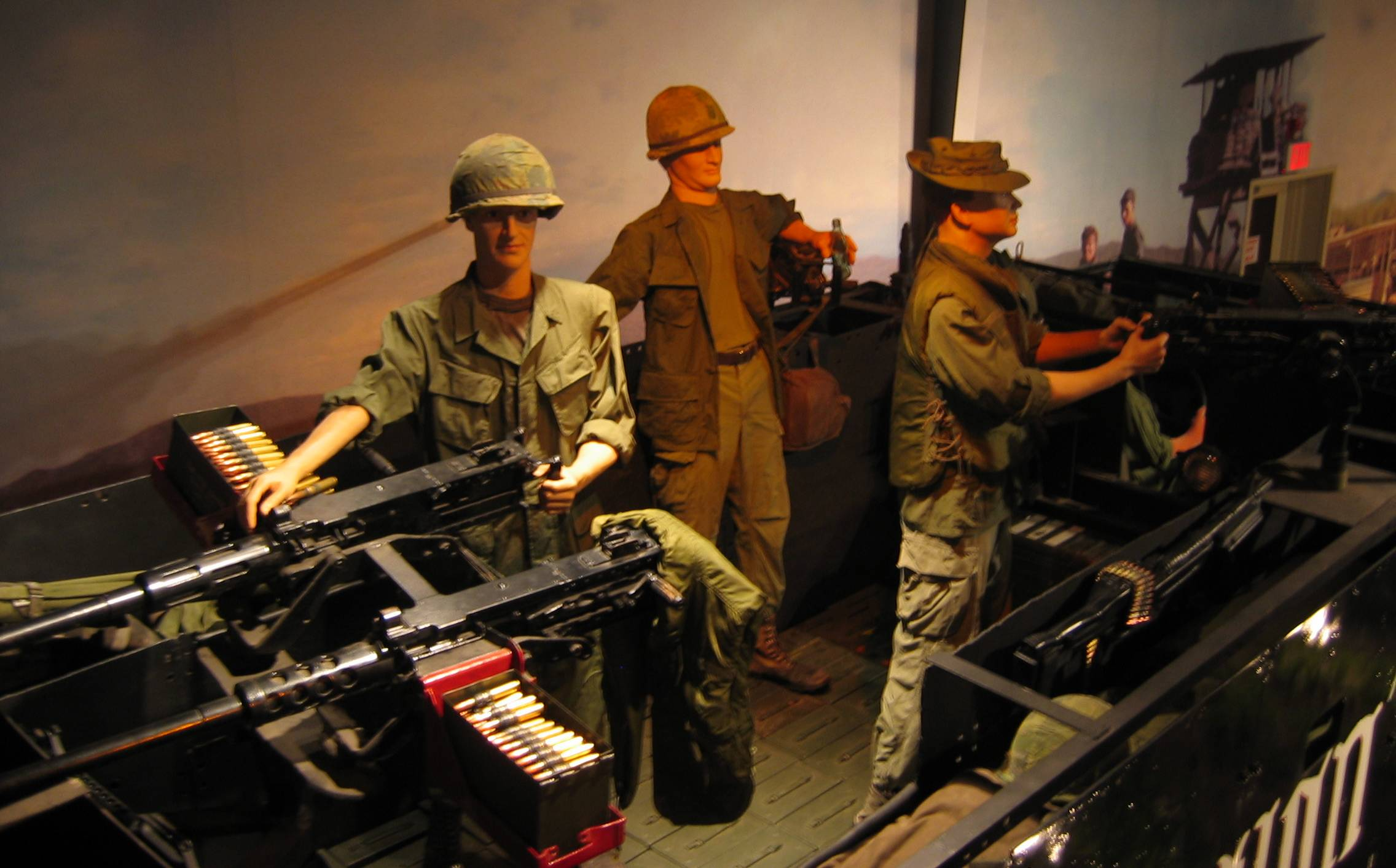
Eve of Destruction from above.

The gun truck design evolved with a four-sided gun box bolted on the outside of the truck bed, then an inner steel wall was added, with a space between each layer, to provide protection against anti-tank rockets. Because of the shortage of steel kits, the M113 armoured personnel carrier hulls were mounted on the bed of a five-ton truck, thus providing all-round protection for the crew. The last design of gun box had the steel wall mounted inside the bed of the truck instead of outside. Despite their aggressive names, gun trucks were strictly defensive weapons, being used only for convoy escort and perimeter defense duties.

Gun trucks suffered from several drawbacks. The added weight of armour, weapons and ammunition increased fuel consumption, as well as creating maintenance problems and reducing the durability of the truck frames. Also, the personnel assigned as crew to the security vehicles were no longer available for transport duties, thus reducing the lift capacity of each unit. Despite this, they were generally regarded as a success.

In all, an estimated 300 to 400 trucks were transformed in this way. Senior officers saw the 5-ton gun truck as a temporary solution until enough V-100 armored cars arrived. However, by 1970 it became obvious to all - except the Military Police - that the V-100 was a death trap if the armor was penetrated. Furthermore, the V-100 had problems with its power train. So the gun trucks continued to serve until the last American truck company was inactivated in South Vietnam in 1972. With the end of the Vietnam War, the need for such vehicles disappeared and most were either scrapped or returned to cargo carrying. One truck, an M54 named by its crew "Eve of Destruction," was brought back intact and is on display at the Army Transportation Museum at Fort Eustis, Virginia.

== Iraq War ==
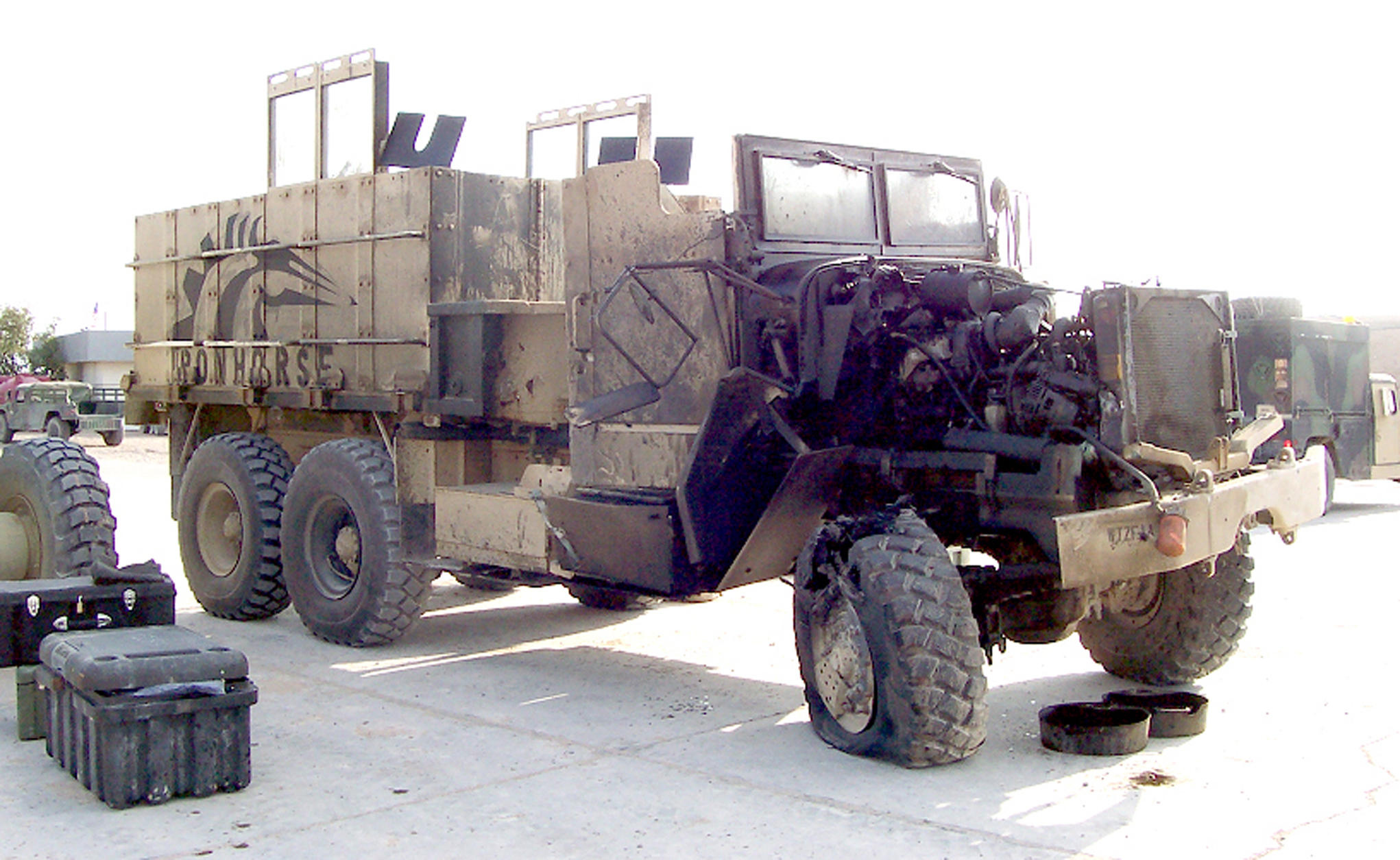
A Hunter gun truck, Iron Horse, damaged by an IED in Iraq. All the crew members survived.

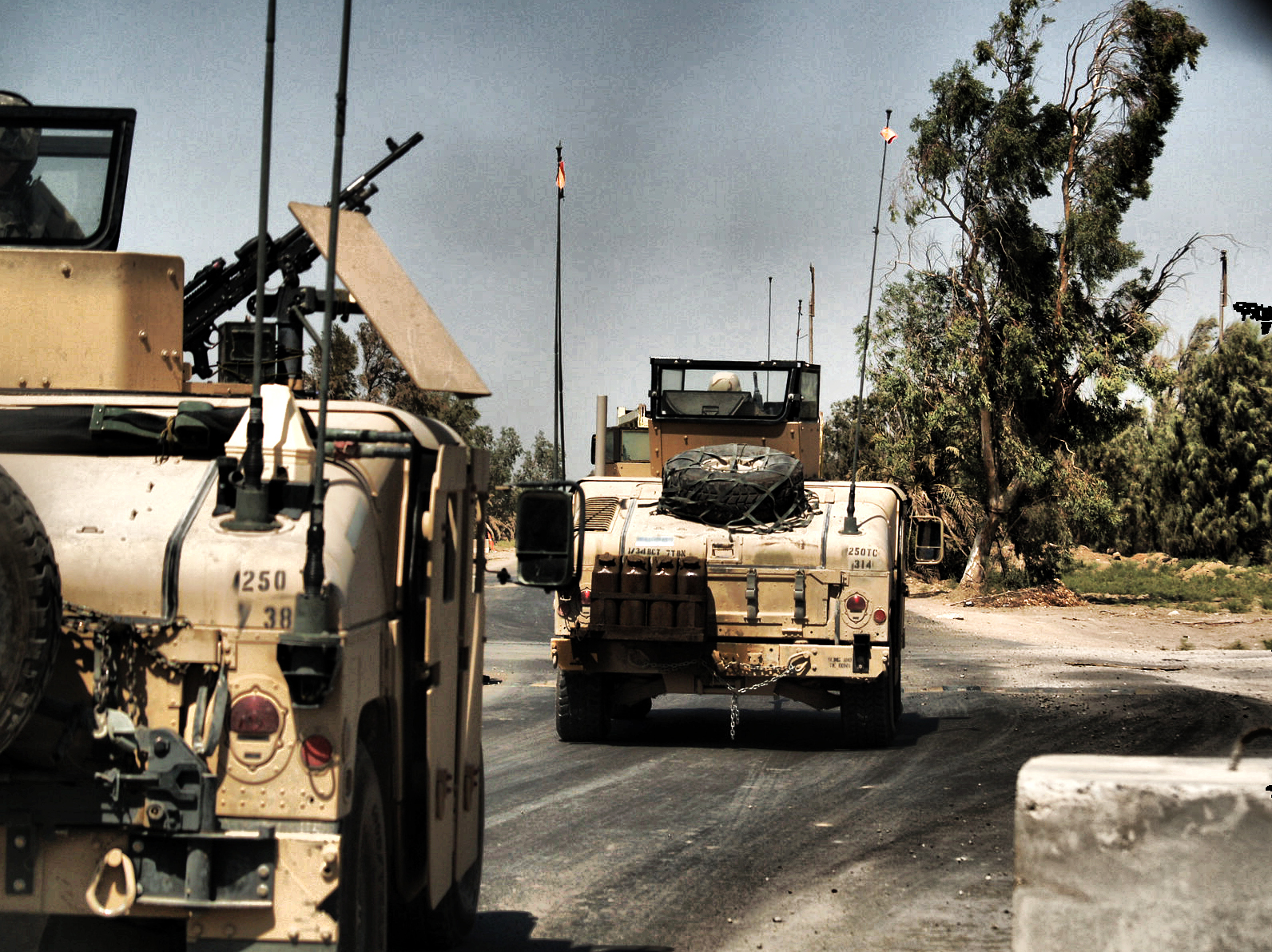
An M1114 Military light utility vehicle (250th TC/1-34BCT) on mission in Nasiriyah, Iraq

During the Iraq War, the vulnerability of American supply convoys became apparent as soon as March 2003, when a maintenance unit was ambushed in Nasiriyah, with eleven soldiers killed and five taken prisoner, including Pfc. Jessica Lynch. Not until June 2003 during the post-invasion phase of the war, did the Iraqi insurgents begin attacking convoys with regularity, which led to the re-invention of the gun truck. The truck units initially used sandbags and plywood as outlined in FM 55-30, but experienced the same problems as encountered in Vietnam.

By definition a gun truck was any wheeled vehicle with a crew-served weapon regardless of whether it had any armor or not. Initially, the truck drivers mounted armor and machine guns on any and every wheeled vehicle in their inventory but settled on two primary platforms, the M939 five-ton truck and the HMMWV. The Palletized Load Systems were also converted to gun trucks because fully loaded with cargo they could not keep up with the other trucks. The minimum requirement for gun truck escort was two gun trucks and each unit experimented with different gun truck designs and procedures.

On April 5, 2004, the cleric Muqtadā al-Ṣadr called for a jihad against coalition forces and beginning on Thursday night, April 8, his Mahdi Militia destroyed eight bridges and overpasses around the Convoy Support Center Scania, the last truck stop before entering the Sunni Triangle, thus severing the supply line from the south, and then began large scale ambushes. Up until that night, the ambushes involved no more than seven ambushers with kill zones no larger than 100 meters. The next day the Militia ambushed any convoy heading into or out of Baghdad International Airport with kill zones several hundred meters long. The worst ambush killed eight KBR drivers and three US Army drivers of the 724th Transportation Company. Keith Matthew Maupin was listed as the only American soldier missing in action for several years until his body was finally discovered. After that, Brigadier General James Chambers, Commander of the 13th Corps Support Command, standardized the ratio of gun trucks per convoy and convoys should not exceed 30 vehicles.

In April 2004, Leaders of the US Army Reserve 375th Transportation Group and the 812th Transportation Battalion formed a special provisional unit - the 518th Transportation Company called "Gun Truck" Company. Based in Camp Navistar (located on the Kuwait side of the border Near Safwan, Iraq), this company acquired 35 humvees and five M939 five-ton trucks, and modified them with improvised armor and .50 calibre machine-guns. With many Reserve and National Guard combat arms units already converting and performing Convoy Security Escort service while deployed to Iraq, as companies arrived to perform the convoy security mission, the 7th Transportation Group disbanded the unit in April, 2005.

The use of improvised fighting vehicles, protected by the so-called "Hillbilly armor", quickly became a political issue, with the Bush administration coming under criticism for having sent the U.S. military to fight without adequate equipment. The idea of producing a standardised gun truck was instigated by Representative Duncan Hunter (R.-Calif.), chairman of the House Armed Services Committee, despite the reluctance of some Army superior officers.

Developed with the help of Vietnam veterans by the Lawrence Livermore National Laboratory, the resulting armored box (dubbed the "Hunter box") was intended for use on five-ton trucks. Their armor protection was composed of high-grade steel plating, fiberglass and ballistic glass, while the armament consisted of two to four heavy machine-guns.

The first prototype was completed in March 2004, and shipped to Iraq in July 2004, after which production began at a slow rate, with 35 units in service by July 2005. As of September 2007, a total of 100 kits had been produced for Iraq, and 18 for use in Afghanistan. The "Hunter boxes" apparently proved popular with U.S. troops, but were criticized by senior officers for their lack of overhead protection, and for being top-heavy. However, few cases exist to prove their doubts in this equipment.

Fully armored M1114s and factory-built add-on-armor kits for the Humvee light utility vehicles were arriving in quantity by the end of 2004, and the cab armor kits for fleet of 5-ton trucks, M915 tractors and Heavy Equipment Transport Systems began arriving the next year. Priority of the M1114s went to Iraq-based escort units while the Kuwait-based truck companies that had to drive all across Iraq received the add-on-armor kits until more M1114s arrived. The soldiers appreciated the much needed armored protection but the extra weight of the add-on-armor kits reduced the Humvee's acceleration and speed substantially. The suspension and power train wore out quickly. The modified heavier vehicle's sluggishness could not match the maneuverability of the insurgent's vehicles. By the Palm Sunday Ambush (see Lee Ann Hester) on March 20, 2005, all vehicles on the road had some form of armor whether improvised or factory built. After suffering high losses during this ambush, with no Americans killed, the insurgents turned to IEDs as their primary weapon of choice.

The appearance of the explosively formed projectile required additional fragmentary armor added to the M1114s, which over-taxed their power trains and suspension systems. The improved M1151 Up-armored HMMWV became the escort platform of choice along with the 5-ton gun trucks until the MRAPs began replacing them in 2008. The Heavy Equipment Transporter proved to be the most survivable vehicle on the road because of its height, so Kuwait-based units began sending them out ahead of the convoy looking for IEDs.

The Army Transportation Museum preserved several examples of Iraq and Afghanistan gun trucks. It has a Hill Billy armor 5-ton gun truck from Iraq, HMMWV with prototype add-on-armor kit, M1114 that survived an IED blast in Afghanistan, a LLNL 5-ton gun truck "Ace of Spades" from Iraq, two MRAPs, a M915 and Heavy Equipment Transporter with cab armor kits from Iraq, and a "Frankenstein" cab armor kit for the M939 5-ton truck. The Airman Heritage Museum also preserved a Hill Billy armor 5-ton gun truck from Iraq. The 1st Cavalry Museum brought back the last MRAP of the last convoy to cross the border from Iraq.

== Colombia ==
The Colombian Army have several guns trucks based on the M35 2-1/2 ton cargo truck, locally named as "Meteoro", which are trucks with indigenous armour and two M2 heavy machine guns. Other models of trucks are modified to similar specification. These gun trucks are used for convoy protection and checkpoints against the guerrillas.

== Similar vehicles ==
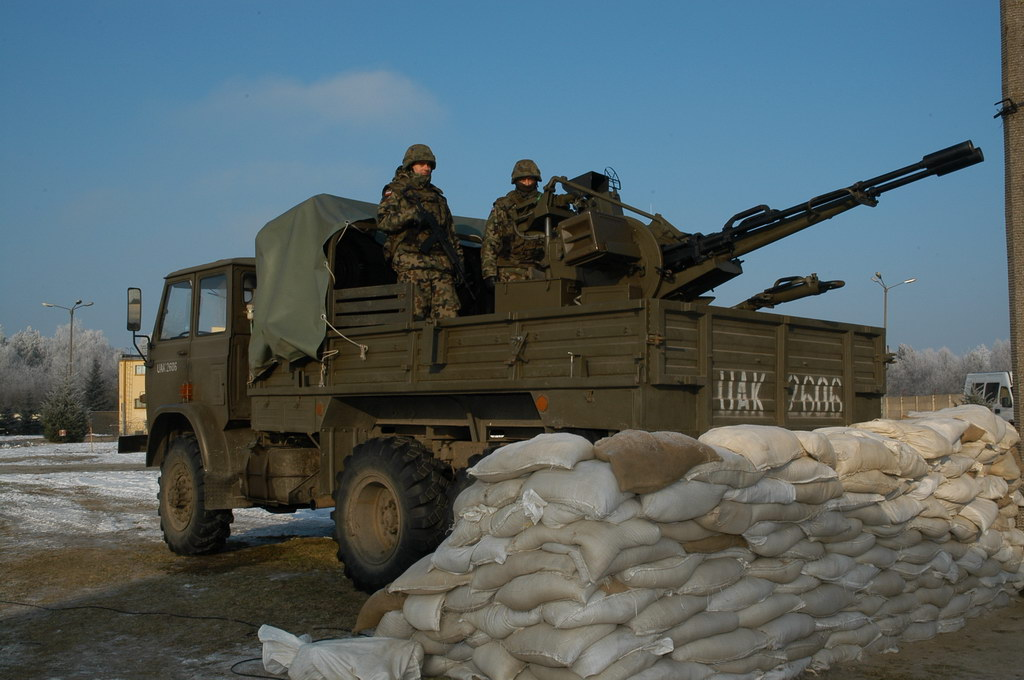
Polish Star 266 gun truck with ZU-23-2 auto cannon (Hibneryt).

- During the Easter Rising in 1916, the British Army used a truck fitted with an armoured body. This was constructed from the smokeboxes of several steam locomotives. Gun-slits were cut in the body to allow troops to fire out. Painted black, dummy gun-slits were also applied to confuse snipers.
- During the Soviet–Afghan War, Soviet convoys were frequently ambushed by Afghan mujahideen guerillas. The rebel groups often sited their ambush parties on surrounding heights, above the maximum elevation of the main weapons of the tanks and APCs employed as convoy escorts. As a stop-gap solution to this problem, the Soviets fitted twin-barrelled 23 mm ZU-23-2 anti-aircraft guns onto Kamaz trucks, with tents to camouflage the armaments. These vehicles possessed extreme firepower, but they lacked armour, and the crew were exposed to machine-gun and small-arms fire.

== See also ==
- Improvised vehicle armour
- Improvised fighting vehicle
- Technical
- Motorised Infantry
- Portee
- Larry G. Dahl, a Vietnam gun truck crew member who was awarded the Medal of Honor
- Laager
