= Auto-Saharan Companies =

Italian military units which specialized in long range patrols of the Sahara Deser

Auto-Saharan Company
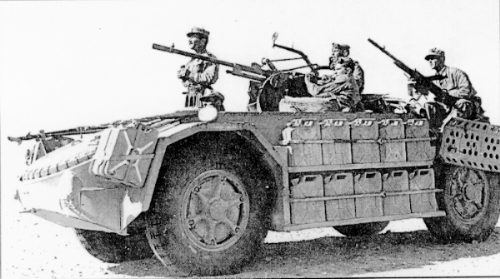
- An AS.42 desert patrol vehicle of the Auto-Saharan Company
- Active: 1 July 1937 - 13 May 1943
- Disbanded: 13 May 1943
- Country: Kingdom of Italy
- Branch: Royal Italian Army
- Role: Reconnaissance; Intelligence gathering Raiding operations
- Nickname(s): "La Compagnia"
- Equipment: Trattore Leggero SPA TL.37 "Libia", Autocarro Sahariano SPA AS.37, Camionetta Desertica SPA-Viberti AS.42, Camion FIAT 634, Camion Lancia 3 RO
- Engagements: Second World War: North African campaign; Italian invasion of Egypt; Operation Compass; Battle of Kufra; Tunisian campaign

Commanders
- Notable commanders: Alberto Mannerini

The Auto-Saharan Companies (Compagnie Auto-Avio-Sahariane) were Italian military units specialised in long range patrols of the Sahara Desert. Companies were formed around expert soldiers (called "Arditi Camionettisti"), riding AB 41 armored cars and FIAT and Lancia light trucks customized to operate in the desert. The units operated from the late 1930s to the Italian surrender in 1943.

== History ==
The Saharan companies were first formed in 1923 by a conversion of dromedary mounted troops, Méhariste, to patrol between the Italian forts in the Libyan Sahara desert in Italian Libya. These units were formed with mixed Italian and Libyan personnel. In 1938 the five existing companies were reorganized as motorized units with their own aerial support. The companies received new off-road vehicles and a light aircraft section (manned by Regia Aeronautica personnel). In March 1941 five new Compagnie Sahariane were formed.

Two aircraft sections (Sezioni Aeroplani) were formed in order to operate together with the Saharan companies. Each section had four planes for reconnaissance and liaison, the most effective of which was the twin engined Caproni Ca.309 Ghibli.

In concept, the Auto-Saharan Company was similar to the British Long Range Desert Group (LRDG) which was created (as a partial copy) in 1940, except that the company also had the support of its own air arm to assist in long range reconnaissance and ground attack.

During the North African Campaign the Auto-Saharan Companies were tasked to conduct reconnaissance. The number of active companies varied from three and five during the war, and each company was equipped with 20 to 30 vehicles and three Caproni Ca.309 Ghibli light aircraft for reconnaissance.

In 1940, at the beginning of the war, these companies were part of the Maletti Group but located at the oasis of Kufra, in southeastern Italian Libya. On January 31, 1941, the British LRDG were intercepted by the Compagnia Autosahariana di Cufra in the Gebel Sherif valley.

The enemy who were forty-four strong in two armoured fighting vehicles and five trucks had the advantage of close co-operation with aircraft and of being armed with Breda guns (Auto-avio sahariana).

— Ambush at Jebel Sherif, Official History of New Zealand in the Second World War 1939–45

In this victorious skirmish British members of the Long Range Desert Group (LRDG) suffered one man killed and two taken prisoner, included Major Clayton, and the loss of three desert vehicles. The Italians suffered three killed and three injured. The remaining four British soldiers fled through the Libyan desert to the Nile. Major Clayton was conferred a Distinguished Service Order.

The Compagnie Auto-avio sahariane continued their confrontations with the LRDG in 1941 and 1942, but their activity was reduced because of lack of gasoline. Under Dal Pozzo leadership these units made an incursion inside Egypt and in November 1942 defeated the British raiders in two small skirmishes. After El Alamein they lost their Libyan troops, but they were enlarged to 5000 men (all Italians) in Tunisia as Saharian Group ("Raggruppamento Sahariano") under the orders of General Alberto Mannerini.

One German narrator says that there were 'about five battalions and three light batteries' (in the Raggruppamento Mannerini), but this estimate is certainly too low for artillery units. Another detailed estimate shows that there were about ten companies of sorts and eight batteries, very mixed in nature and calibre. Probably the total strength (initially) was something short of 2,500, which is the highest figure given anywhere. It was known to the Intelligence service—and so to NZ Corps—that the troops in the Gap were all Italian.

The Mannerini Raggruppamento fought hard in the area of Mareth and Sfax (Battle of the Mareth Line), until the final Italian surrender in Africa in May 1943.

== Organisation ==
In 1940, a Compagnia Sahariana, according to regulations, was composed of four platoons (one HQ, two motorized and one machine guns), the strength was 4 officers, 7 NCOs and 32 Italian enlisted together with 77 Libyan enlisted totaling 120 men. The company operated with 16 AS.37 off-road cars and 3 trucks (FIAT 634). One of the AS.37 in the HQ platoon was equipped with radio in order to maintain real time liaison with the aircraft during operations.

In 1942, the organisation of the companies was revised, other than the HQ platoon, a company was made up with one infantry motorized platoon, one machine guns motorized platoon, one 20mm cannons motorized platoon and one 47/32 anti-tank cannons motorized platoon. They could rely on 7 off-road vehicles (AS.37 or AS.42) and 10 trucks (LANCIA 3 RO). A single company was manned by 5 officers, 3 NCOs, 2 Italian enlisted and 133 Libyan enlisted.

== Weapons ==
The most common and versatile weapon used by Auto-Saharan Companies was the Cannone-Mitragliera Breda 20mm mod.35. Following the successful experience made by Italian units operating together with the Francoists in the Spanish Civil War, the installation of 20mm Breda machineguns on medium trucks began in 1939. The gun-carriage, without its legs, was fixed to the vehicle with a pin. During the war the 20mm Breda machine-guns used different kinds of ammunition, initially HE air defence and HE piercing. At the end of 1942 armor-piercing incendiary ammunition was also in use.

The standard Italian anti-tank cannon Ansaldo-Bohler 47/32 was used by Saharan motorized units, mainly mounted on revolving platforms on LANCIA 3 RO lorries but also on AS.37 or AS.42. The 47/32 was able to fire various kinds of HE, piercing and piercing-exploding ammunition. Maximum useful range as an anti-tank gun was 700 metres (770 yd), the piercing power at 650 metres (710 yd) with 30 degrees impact angle was 40 mm, at 1,600 metres (1,700 yd) the piercing power was reduced to only 30 mm. Since the beginning of the war, due to the progress in tank design, the usefulness as an anti-tank weapon of the 47/32 was very limited, and it proved effective only against light tanks and armoured cars.

== Vehicles ==
The vehicles most commonly used by Saharan Companies were the following:

- Trattore Leggero SPA TL.37 "Libia". The TL.37 was a four-wheeled artillery tractor with all-wheel steering. The vehicle, designed in 1937, was powered by a four-cylinder gasoline engine, the 52 hp SPA 18R. It had a maximum speed of 38 km/h (24 mph) and could carry 800 kg (1,800 lb). It could carry six passengers in two front seats and four back seats. The "Libia" variant differed from the basic TL.37 artillery tractor in having a larger fuel tank and specially designed Pirelli tires. Some TL.37 "Libia" variants were armed with a 20mm Breda cannon or Cannone da 47/32 M35 anti-tank gun.
- Autocarro Sahariano SPA AS.37. This vehicle, based on the TL.37, was capable of higher speed (50 km/h); the cargo capacity was also increased about 25% to 4,190 kg. The AS.37 had a flat truck bed with two benches facing each other. Starting in 1941, some of them were armed with a 20mm Breda cannon.
- Camionetta Desertica SPA-Viberti AS.42. A four-wheel-drive car specifically designed to operate in the desert, that entered into service with Saharan units in November 1942. It was built on the same chassis as the AB.40/41 armoured car but it was not armoured. It was powered with a 100 hp gasoline engine and reached a maximum speed of 85 km/h. It had racks on the sides to carry 24 jerrycans (mostly fuel) and carried a spare tire on the front hood. It could accommodate a crew of six and weapons such as the 20mm Breda cannon, the Cannone da 47/32 M35, the 20mm Solothurn S-18/100 anti-tank rifle, and up to three Breda mod. 37 machineguns. The AS.42 was 1.49 meters high, 5.20 meters long and 1.80 meters wide.
- Camion FIAT 634. The military variant of the civil FIAT 632 truck, was 3.24 meters high, 7.43 meters long, and 2.40 meters wide. It had six wheels, two on the front axle and four on the rear axle. It had a maximum load of 7640 kg and a maximum speed of 40 km/h and was powered by a diesel engine. It was used by Saharan units to transport troops or supplies.
- Camion Lancia 3 RO. A six-wheeled truck like the FIAT 634. More than 12,000 were built for the Regio Esercito. It was powered by a 5-cylinder, 93 hp diesel engine, giving it a speed of 50 km/h. It was 3 meters high, 7.25 meters long, and 2.35 meters wide. It was able to carry up to 8 tons of cargo. The 3 RO used by Saharan companies had a 20mm Breda cannon or 47/32 anti-tank gun on a rotating platform on the flatbed.

== Air support ==
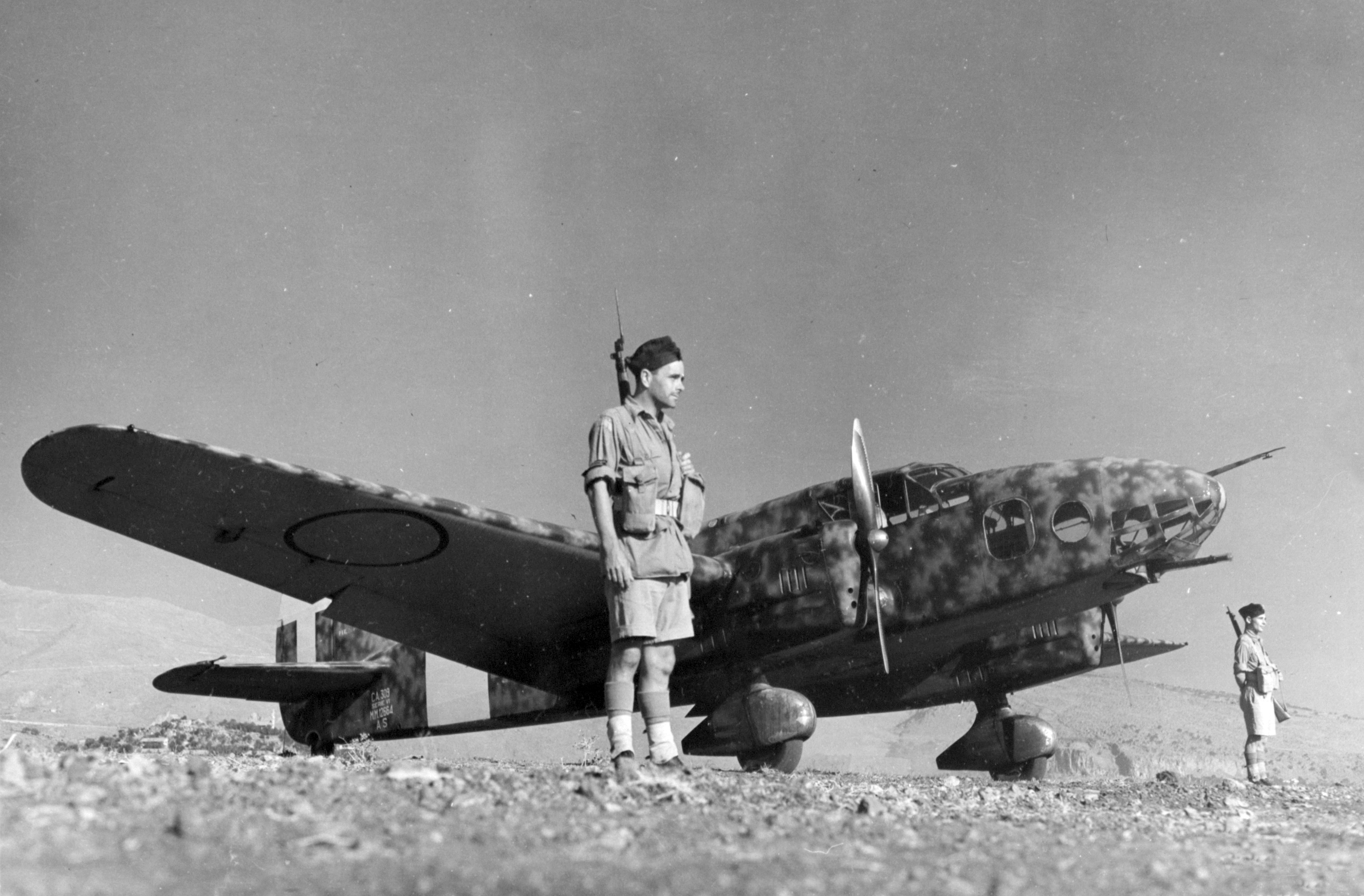
Caproni Ca.309 in Sicily.

Every "compagnia" was supported until November 1942, by 3 Caproni Ca.309 aircraft, nicknamed "Ghibli" (Desert Wind). In Tunisia the "Raggruppamento sahariano" had no air support but a Ca.309, left in Libya because of damage, was repaired and remained active in Africa until May 1943. The Ca.309 (with a 3 crew) was a low-wing cantilever monoplane with a piston engine fitted to each wing, and was intended to serve as a reconnaissance and ground-attack aircraft. It had 3 × 7.7 mm (.303 in) Breda SAFAT machine guns and could carry bombs up to 330 kg.

== See also ==
- Operation Salaam
- Western Desert Campaign
- Long Range Desert Group

== Bibliography ==
- Bedeschi, Giulio (1979). Fronte d'Africa: c'ero anch'io [African Front: I was there Too]. Testimonianze fra cronaca e storia/Testimony Between Chronicle and History (number 107). Milano: Mursia. OCLC 797260474.
- Cappellano, Filippo (1998). Le artiglierie del Regio Esercito nella seconda guerra mondiale. Parma: Albertelli. ISBN 88-87372-03-9.
- Pignato, Nicola; Cappellano, Filippo (2005). Gli autoveicoli tattici e logistici del Regio Esercito italiano fino al 1943 [The Tactical and Supply Vehicles of the Italian Royal Army until 1943]. Roma: Stato Maggiore dell'Esercito – Ufficio Storico. ISBN 978-88-87940-46-6.
- Molinari, Andrea (2007). Desert raiders: Axis and Allied Special Forces 1940-43. Oxford: Osprey Publishing. ISBN 978-1-84603-006-2.
- O'Carroll, Brendan; Chiarvetto, Roberto (2009). Gross, Kuno (ed.). Incident at Jebel Sherif: In Search of the First Clash of the Special Forces 1941/2009. Berlin: Kuno Gross. ISBN 978-0-620-42010-5.
