= Romanian armored cars during World War II =

During the Second World War, the Romanian Army possessed around 200 armored cars. These ranged from captured inoperable Soviet vehicles to modern German and Italian front line models, as well as internal security vehicles.

== Conducător's security battalion ==
At the start of World War II, Romania owned a total of 19 armored cars. All were used by the security battalion of Conducător Ion Antonescu. Six of these vehicles dated from World War I (two French Peugeot Armored Cars and four Russian Austin-Putilovs). The remaining thirteen were modern Czechoslovak vehicles which escaped from Ruthenia in early 1939, namely ten Tatra armored cars and three produced by Škoda.

Marshal Antonescu himself used a bulletproof Mercedes-Benz 770 W150, a gift from Adolf Hitler.

== Front line vehicles ==
The first front line combat armored cars were acquired in late 1942-early 1943. They comprised 11 Leichter Panzerspähwagens (six Sd. Kfz. 222 and five Sd. Kfz. 223). A much more significant delivery came in August 1943, when the Germans transferred 40 Sd. Kfz. 222 along with 8 Italian-built AB 41s. In 1941, Romania built one armored car prototype armed with one Czechoslovak-made 37 mm gun.

== Captured vehicles ==
By October 1941, 103 Soviet armored cars were captured by the Romanian Army. Most of these vehicles, however, were not serviceable. The captured Soviet armored cars (or at least the ones which could be made serviceable) were of the BA-10 type. More Soviet vehicles were captured later, as evidenced by the presence of the BA-64 within the Romanian Army's ranks (this model started production only in 1942).

== List ==
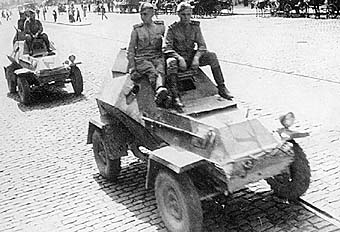
Romanian BA-64

Vehicle	Origin	Number	Notes
Front line vehicles
Sd. Kfz. 222	Germany	46	Most acquired in August 1943
Sd. Kfz. 223	Germany	35	Acquired in late 1942, early 1943 and 1944
AB-41	Italy	8	All acquired in August 1943
Internal security vehicles
Peugeot Armored Car	France	2	World War I model
Austin-Putilov	Russia	4	World War I model
OA vz. 30	Czechoslovakia	10	Acquired in early 1939
OA vz. 27	Czechoslovakia	3	Acquired in early 1939
Bulletproof Mercedes-Benz 770 W150	Germany	1	Marshal Antonescu's personal car, a gift from Hitler
Captured vehicles
BA-10; BA-64	Soviet Union	103+	Most captured by October 1941
Others
AB md. 41	Romania	1	Made in 1941
