= Leichter Panzerspähwagen =

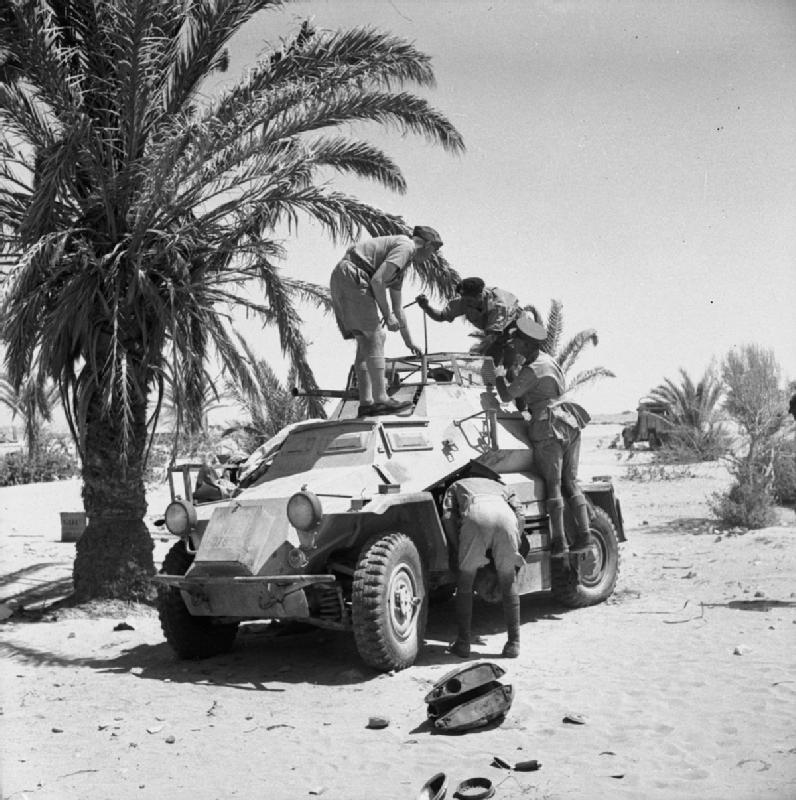
- British soldiers inspect a captured Sd.Kfz. 222, North Africa, 1941
- Type: Armored car / Scout car
- Place of origin: Nazi Germany

Service history
- In service: 1935-1945
- Used by: Nazi Germany; Republic of China
- Wars: Second Sino-Japanese War; World War II

Production history
- Designer: Eisenwerk Weserhütte
- Manufacturer: Auto Union; F. Schichau
- Unit cost: 23,420 ℛ︁ℳ︁
- Produced: 1935–1944
- No. built: 2,394

Specifications
- Mass: 4,000 kg (8,800 lb)
- Length: 4.8 m (15 ft 9 in)
- Width: 1.95 m (6 ft 5 in)
- Height: 1.7 m (5 ft 7 in)
- Crew: 3
- Armour: 5–14.5 mm (0.20–0.57 in)
- Main armament: 1 × MG34 machine gun (for Sd.Kfz. 221); 1 × 2 cm KwK 30 L/55 autocannon (for Sd.Kfz. 222)
- Secondary armament: 1 × Maschinengewehr 34 (for Sd.Kfz. 222)
- Engine: Horch 3.8 V8 petrol 90 PS (66 kW; 89 hp)
- Suspension: 4x4
- Operational range: 350 km (220 mi)
- Maximum speed: Road: 80 km/h (50 mph); Cross-country: 40 km/h (25 mph)

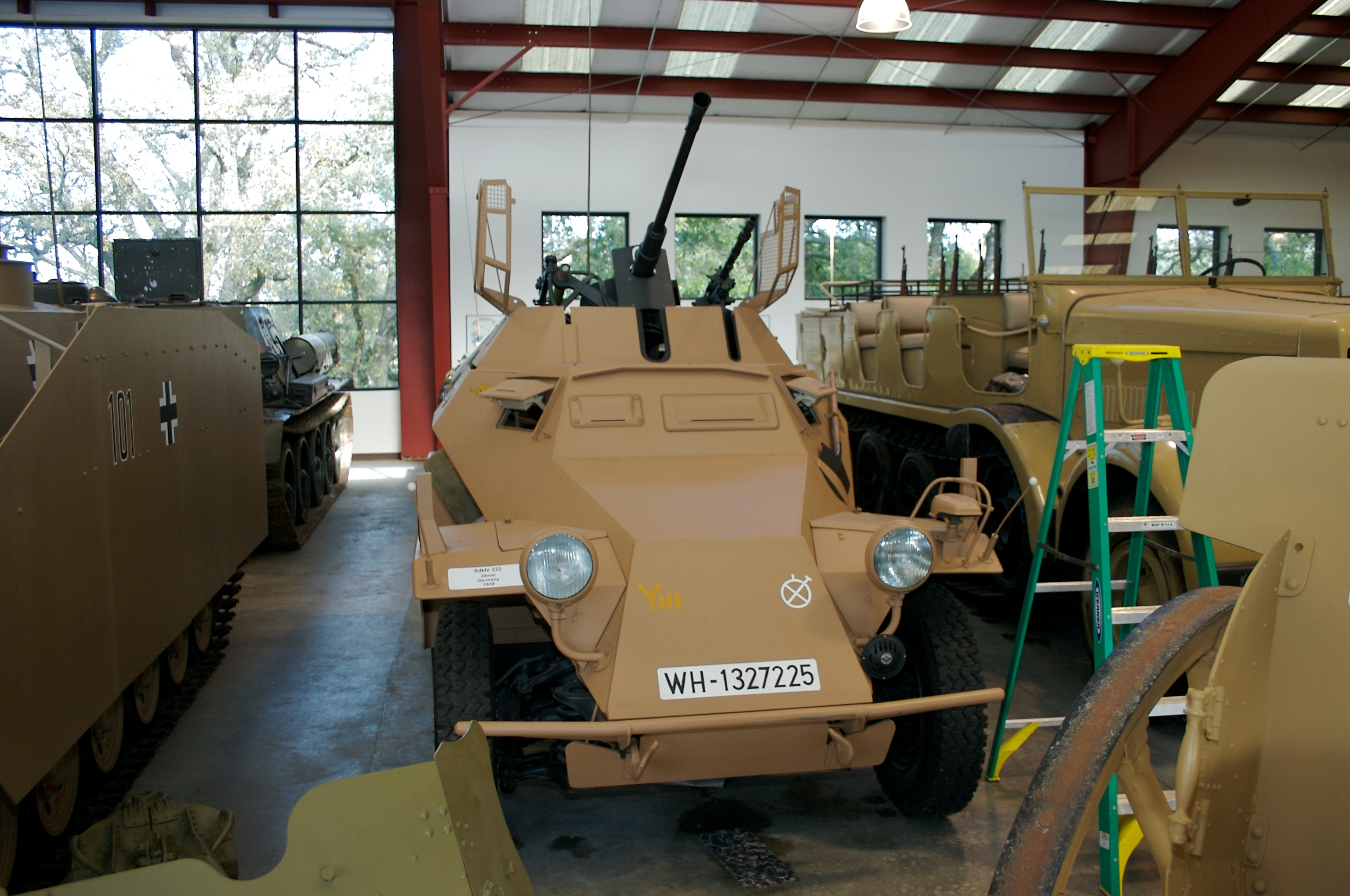
Sd.Kfz. 222 in private collection.

The Leichter Panzerspähwagen (German: "light armoured reconnaissance vehicle") was a series of light four-wheel drive armoured cars produced by Nazi Germany from 1935 to 1944.

== Development history ==
The Sd.Kfz. 221 was the first in a series of light reconnaissance vehicles designed to meet operational requirements including reliability, an ability to run on a variety of grades of fuel, simple construction and good off-road performance. However, this type proved too small and too lightly armed, so in 1936-37 a heavier version was planned, using one of two standard chassis for four-wheeled armoured cars - one with a front-mounted engine, the other rear-mounted. The latter was used in the Sd.Kfz. 222, which then became the standard light armoured car in German army service until the defeat of Nazi Germany.

The vehicles were developed by Eisenwerk Weserhütte of Bad Oeynhausen by using the chassis of the type Horch 108 (one of the Einheits-PKW der Wehrmacht standardised designs of heavy off-road car for the armed forces) with an angled armoured body and turret.

Chassis were built by Horch (Auto Union) in Zwickau and assembled by F. Schichau of Elbing and Maschinenfabrik Niedersachsen Hannover in Hanover-Linden.

The rear-mounted petrol engine was originally a 3.5 Litre Horch V8 with 75 PS (55 kW; 74 hp) (Ausf. A chassis); from 1942, this was replaced by a 3.8 Litre with 90 PS (66 kW; 89 hp) (Ausf. B chassis), giving it a road speed of 80 km/h (50 mph) and a cross-country speed of 40 km/h (25 mph). It had a maximum range of 300 km (186 mi).

Used by the reconnaissance battalions (Aufklärungs-Abteilung) of the Panzer divisions, the type performed well enough in countries with good road networks, like those in Western Europe. However, on the Eastern Front and in the deserts of the North African campaign, this class of vehicle was hampered by its relatively poor off-road performance.

The Sd.Kfz. 222 was fitted with heavier armament and a larger turret than the Sd.Kfz. 221 but it was still comparatively cramped and lacked top protection other than a wire screen designed to allow grenades to roll off, but this made using the main armament problematic. The machine gun was mounted co-axially with the autocannon, and both weapons were pintle-mounted, and fitted with an elevation and traverse mechanism and floor-mounted firing mechanisms. The turret was rotated by the traversing weapons rather than the weapons being fixed to a traversing turret. There was thus no bearing-ring and no turret basket, only a fighting compartment largely obstructed by the breeches of the weapons.

When the limitations of the vehicle were highlighted during the invasion of the Soviet Union in 1941 the Sd.Kfz. 222 was gradually replaced in the reconnaissance role by the Sd.Kfz. 250 half-track, but the turret and armament of the Sd Kfz 222 was sometimes retained, despite its shortcomings (the Sd.Kfz. 250/9 variant was a Sd.Kfz. 250 fitted with a top plate surmounted by the same turret and gun combination of the Sd.Kfz. 222 fitted to the half-track) Captured Sd.Kfz. 222s were examined by Soviet designers before they created the similar BA-64 light armoured car.

Front and sides were made of 8 mm (0.3 in) RHA; thinner 5 mm (0.2 in) plates protected the top, rear, and bottom. Cast vision ports later replaced ports cut into the armour. The open-topped turret was fitted with wire mesh anti-grenade screens. Beginning in 1939, the front armour was increased to 14.5 mm (0.6 in). In 1942, the Ausf. B chassis was introduced; this had 30 mm of frontal armour, as well as a more powerful engine.

== Variants ==
Sd.Kfz. 221

Base model and first production series of light armoured car built on a standardised chassis for military use; full designation was Leichter Panzerspähwagen (M.G.) The Sd.Kfz. 221 was armed with a single 7.92 mm Maschinengewehr (MG) 13 machine gun, replaced from 1938 onwards with a Maschinengewehr (MG) 34. It had a two-man crew (driver and commander/gunner), and was equipped with four-wheel drive. Production ran from 1935 to 1940 with at least 339 vehicles produced. It was only produced with Ausf. A chassis and a maximum frontal armour of 14.5 mm. Some Sd.Kfz. 221 were rearmed with a 2.8 cm sPzB 41 heavy anti-tank rifle in a modified turret.

Sd.Kfz. 222

This version of the vehicle was armed with a 2 cm KwK 30 L/55 autocannon and one MG 13 machine gun; full designation was Leichter Panzerspähwagen (2 cm). The crew was increased to three by the addition of a gunner, relieving the commander of that task. In 1938, the MG 13 was replaced by an MG 34, and in 1942 the KwK 30 was replaced by the faster-firing KwK 38 of the same calibre. Production ran from 1937 to late 1943, with at least 990 vehicles produced.

Sd.Kfz. 223

An armoured car with similar features to the Sd.Kfz. 221, but with the addition of a frame antenna and a 30-watt FuG 10 medium-range radio set; full designation was Leichter Panzerspähwagen (Fu). Later versions of the vehicle were equipped with an improved 80-watt FuG 12 radio set. It was originally armed with an MG 13 machine gun, but in 1938 this was changed to an MG 34. The three-man crew consisted of a driver, commander and radio operator. Production ran from 1936 to January 1944, with at least 567 vehicles produced.

Kleiner Panzerfunkwagen Sd.Kfz. 260/261

Unarmed radio car versions with long-range radio equipment and a large "bed-frame" antenna over the vehicle. Generally for signals use, three were used as armoured cars in Finland. The Sd. Kfz 260 was equipped with radio sets to communicate with aircraft, and the Sd.Kfz. 261 with radio sets to communicate with other ground units. By 1 September 1940, the manufacturers had orders for 36 Sd.Kfz. 260 and 289 Sd.Kfz. 261. Production ran from April 1941 to April 1943, with 483 vehicles of both types produced.

== Users ==
- Germany
- China (15 in total, mostly SdKfz 222, two SdKfz 221, at least one SdKfz 260)
- Bulgaria
- Romania (see Romanian armored cars during World War II)

== Notes and references ==
- Perrett, Bryan (1999). German Armoured Cars and Reconnaissance Half-Tracks 1939–45. New Vanguard 29. Osprey Publishing. ISBN 9781855328495.
- "Germany's Panzerspähwagen SdKfz 221 Armored Cars". World War II Vehicles, Tanks and airplanes.
- "Germany's Panzerspähwagen SdKfz 222, Panzerfunkwagen SdKfz 223 Armored Cars". World War II Vehicles, Tanks and airplanes.
