= Viberti =

Viberti badge

Viberti is an Italian manufacturer of trailers and former producer of utility vehicles, buses and mopeds.

== History ==
The company was founded in 1922 to build civilian and military transport vehicles and was a supplier to the Italian armed forces during World War II. One of its products was the Sahariana armored car, but Viberti was better known by its integral Monotral chassisless self-supporting coaches and buses. Viberti also made the Vi-Vi moped from 1955 until 1957 in alliance with the German motorcycle producer Victoria.

In 2011 the trademark Viberti was sold to the Italian manufacturer Acerbi. Since 2016 Viberti is part of the Polish manufacturing group Wielton.

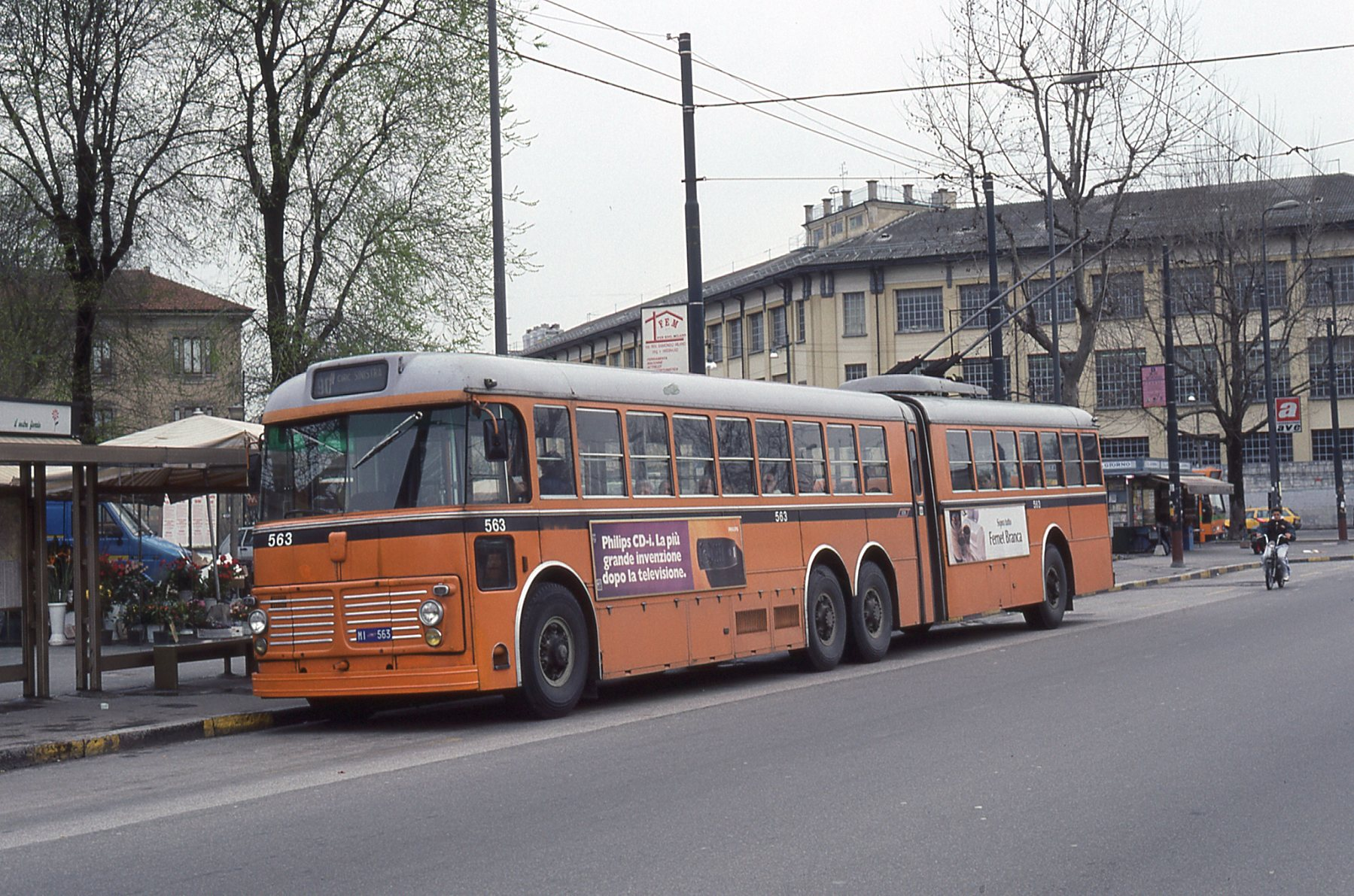
Articulated trolleybus Fiat 2472 with Viberti body in Milan

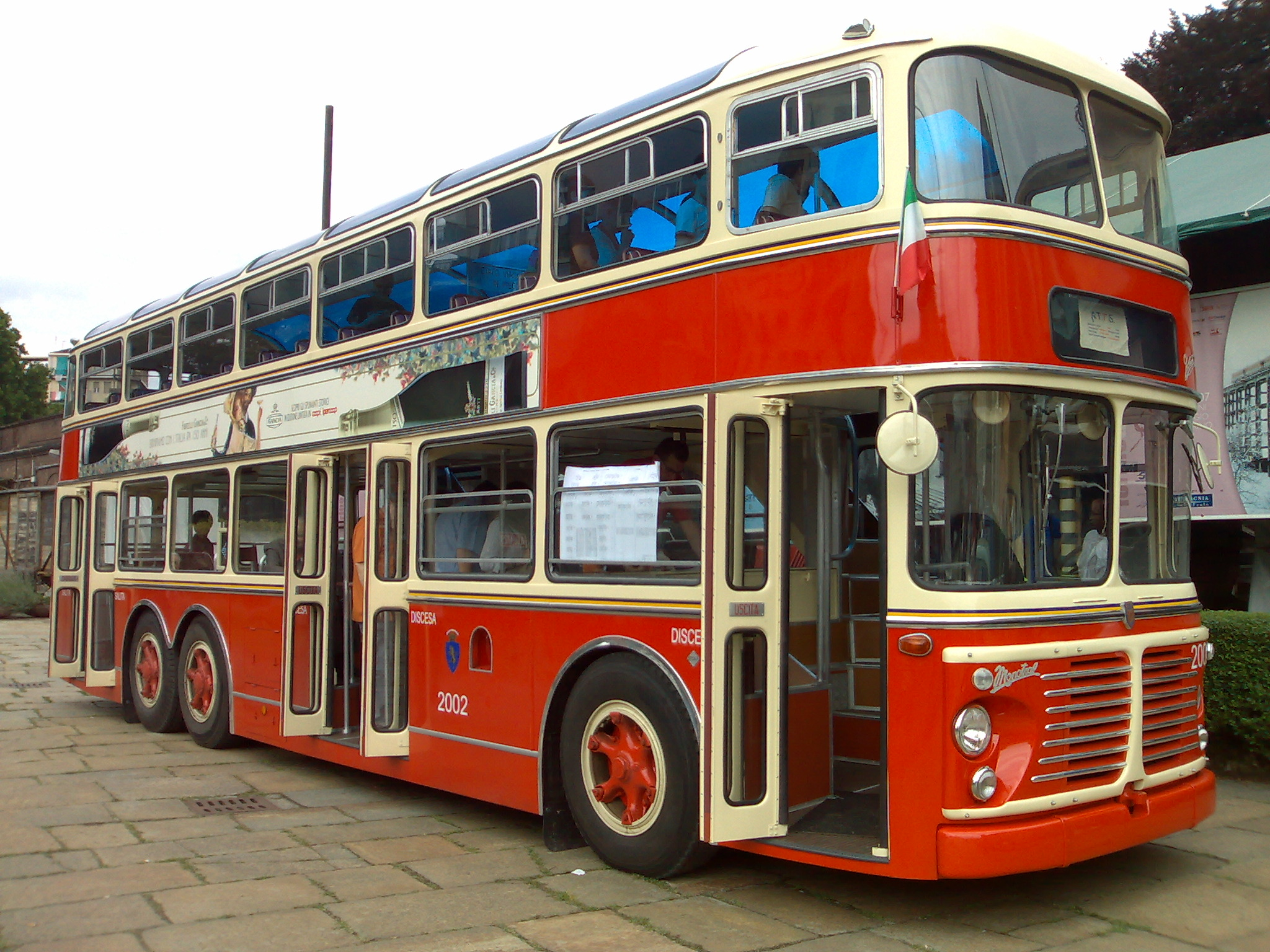
Fiat Viberti Monotral CV61

== See also ==
- Pegaso
- Bus manufacturing
