= Wielton =

Welton SA "manufacturer of tippers and tautliners for traction units in Poland"

Wielton SA
- Type: Incorporation
- Industry: Utility Vehicles
- Founded: 1996; 30 years ago
- Headquarters: Wieluń (Poland)
- Area served: Europe, Asia, Africa
- Key people: Paweł Szataniak (President)
- Products: Trailers
- Revenue: €146 million
- Net income: 16,500,000 euro (2018)
- Number of employees: 3100
- Website: www.wieltongroup.com

Wielton SA is a Polish manufacturer of tippers and tautliners for traction units. The company is the third biggest producer of semi-trailers in Europe and market leader in several countries of Central- and Eastern Europe as well as Central Asia.

== History ==
The predecessor company of Wielton was founded in 1996 by two Polish engineers during the democratic transition of Poland. In the first years, the main object of business was to satisfy the growing demand for utility vehicles. In 1996 the company was restructured and started its own production line. In 2007, it went public on the Warsaw Stock Exchange. Since 2012 the company operates a second assembly plant in Russia to serve the markets in the countries of the Commonwealth of Independent States.

Between 2014 and 2017 the company took over its competitors Italiana Rimorchi including the brands Cardi, Merker and Viberti in Italy, Fruehauf in France, Langendorf in Germany and Lawrence David in the United Kingdom. The business group belonging to it, besides includes five further subsidiary firms in the sales, investment and logistics sector. In 2016, the company opened an assembly plant in Abidjan, Ivory Coast for the whole Economic Community of West African States. The same year, the company received an economic award Narodowy Sukces (The National Success) conferred by the President of Poland.

In February 2022, Wielton announced an agreement with Amazon to deliver several hundred box-type semi-trailers through its British-based subsidiary Lawrence David. The value of the deal is to reach approximately PLN 120 million (GBP 22 million).

In March 2022, following the full-scale Russian invasion of Ukraine, the company suspended its business operations and delivery of its products to Russia. In 2021, the Ukrainian and Russian markets constituted 11% of the company's revenue.

In 2024, a subsidiary, Wielton Defence, was established, specializing in providing transportation solutions dedicated to the defense sector. In 2025, the company signed a framework cooperation agreement with Jelcz, under which the company will supply structural components and provide assembly and production services to the Polish truck manufacturer.

== Gallery ==
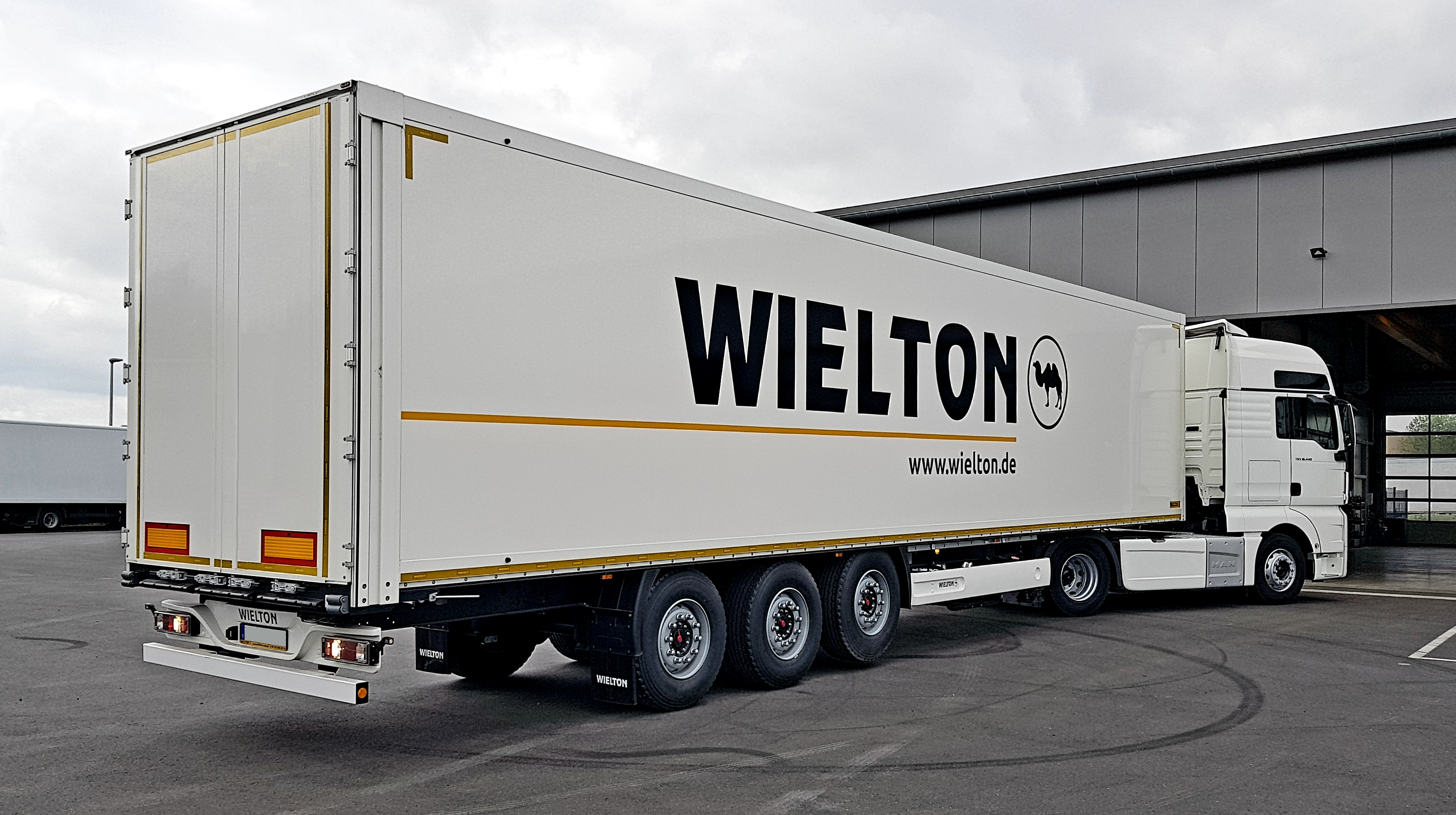
Box semi-trailer made of polyurethane panels.

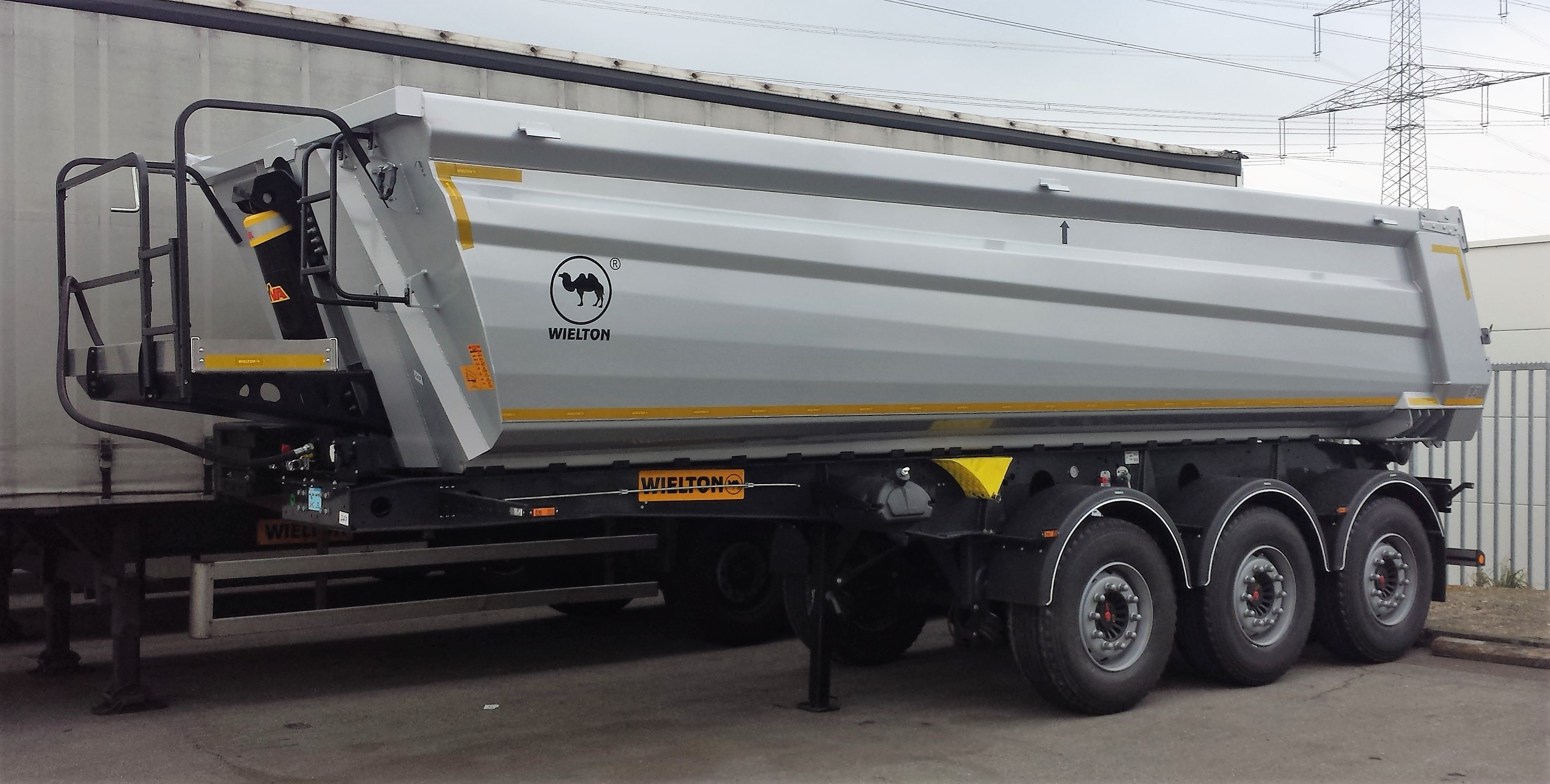
Modern konic formed steel tipper semi-trailer for bitumen.

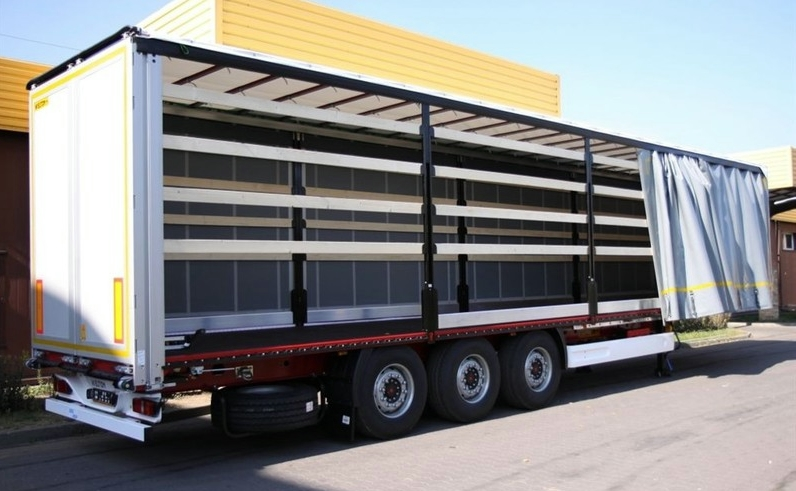
Typical tautliner semi-trailer with a sidecurtain.

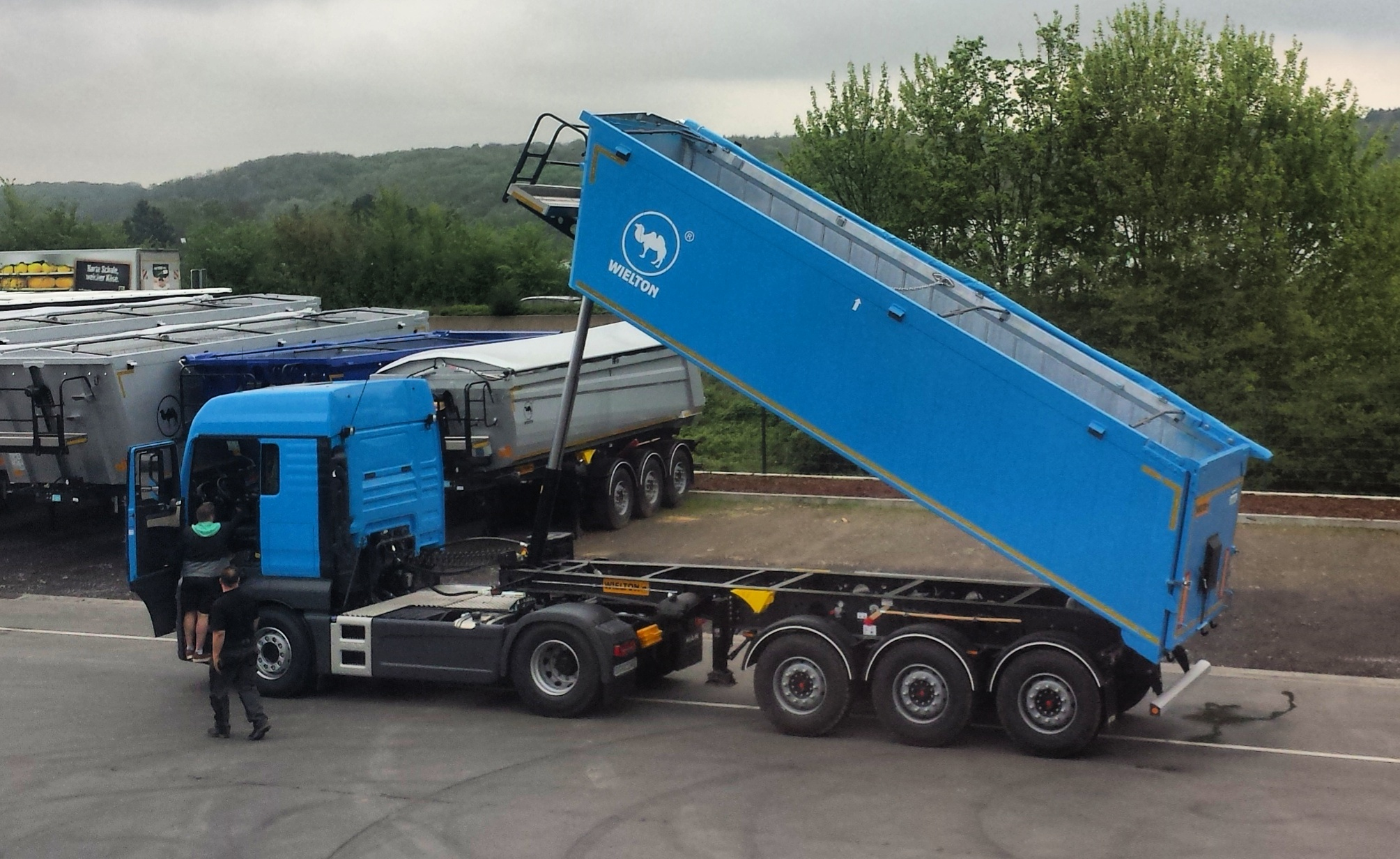
Classic aluminium tipper semi-trailer for grain.

== See also ==
- Economy of Poland
- List of Polish companies
