= SPA-Viberti AS.42 =

Italian desert reconnaissance and patrol vehicle

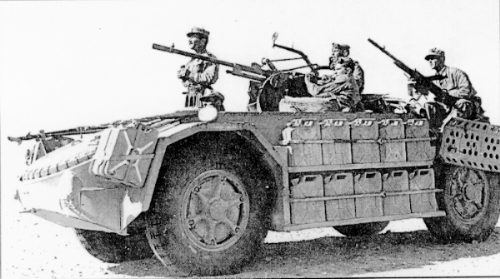
- An AS.42 desert patrol vehicle of the Auto-Saharan Company
- Type: Reconnaissance vehicle
- Place of origin: Italy

Service history
- In service: 1942-1954
- Used by: Royal Italian Army
- Wars: World War II

Production history
- Designed: 1942
- Manufacturer: Viberti
- Produced: 1942-1943
- No. built: c.100

Specifications
- Mass: 4,500 kg (9,900 lb)
- Length: 5.620 m (18 ft 5.3 in)
- Width: 2.260 m (7 ft 5.0 in)
- Height: 1.800 m (5 ft 10.9 in)
- Crew: 5
- Main armament: see Armament
- Engine: 4,995 cc 6-cylinder petrol 100 hp (75 kW)
- Payload capacity: 1,500 kg (3,300 lb)
- Transmission: 6 forward 1 reverse
- Operational range: 300 km (190 mi), with spare cans 1,500 km (930 mi); 30 litres/100 km fuel consumption
- Maximum speed: 84 km/h (52 mph)

The Camionetta Desertica Model 42 (also known as the SPA-Viberti AS.42 or Sahariana) was an Italian reconnaissance car of World War II. The AS.42 (Africa Settentrionale = North Africa) was developed by SPA-Viberti using the same chassis as the AB 41 armoured car, including its four-wheel steering, but with a 2x4 transmission specifically for desert operations, primarily in a reconnaissance role. Its origins trace back to requests stemming from units operating on the North African front for a long range, highly maneuverable vehicle, similar to those widely used by the highly successful British reconnaissance and raiding force, the Long Range Desert Group (LRDG).

== Design ==
The AS.42 was a 4x2 unarmored vehicle with a boat hull based on the chassis of the AB 41 armored car, but with a 2x4 transmission. The 100 horsepower (75 kW) SPA ABM 3 6 cylinder petrol engine was located in the rear. The open compartment's only overhead protection was a waterproof canvas sheet. Besides the driver’s seat, the crew that served the on board weapons were seated on four folding seats on the sides. The AS 42 had internal fuel tanks of 145 liters with an additional 20 jerrycans externally mounted on both sides between the wheels plus 4 on the front fenders, holding a total of 80 liters of water and 400 liters of fuel. One source claims that a full fuel tank and the additional fuel canisters allowed a maximum range of 1,400 km (870 mi), and another source claims a maximum range of 2,000 km (1,200 mi). Crew complement consisted of 3-6 troops

A second model, the SPA 43, called Camionetta II or Metropolitana, entered service in Italy in 1943. It differed from the first model by the absence of the two upper side rows of petrol jerrycans, replaced by two large caissons for ammunition, and the presence of a canvas top. In addition, this version was fitted with new Pirelli Artiglio, Sigillo Verde or Raiflex tires adapted to mud and snow of the mainland, unlike the previous Pirelli Tipo Libia or Superflex sand tires.

== Gallery ==
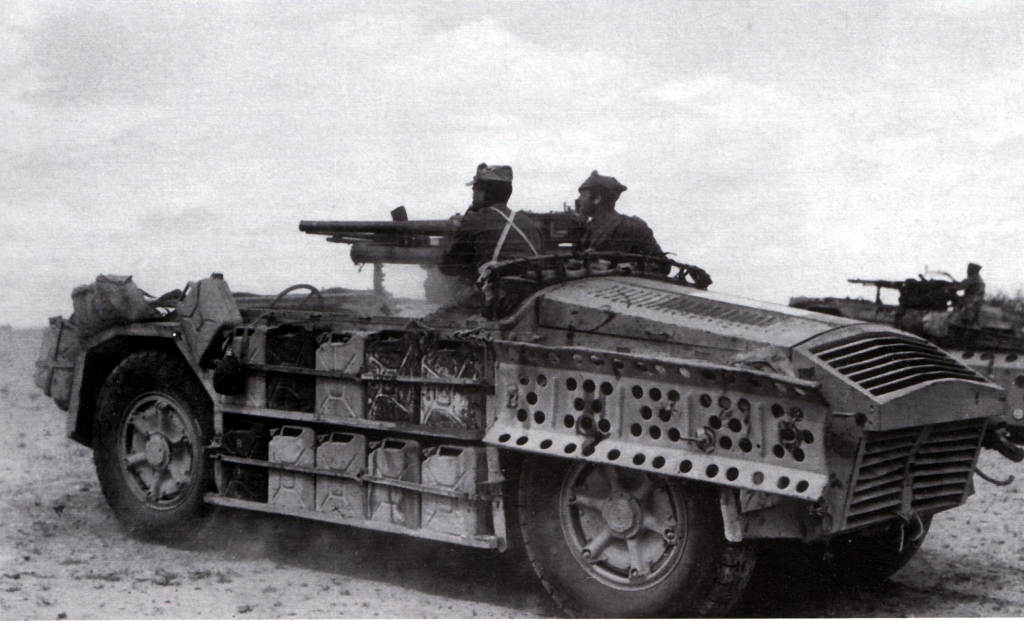
Equipment: cans, sheets and piece of Cannone da 47/32.

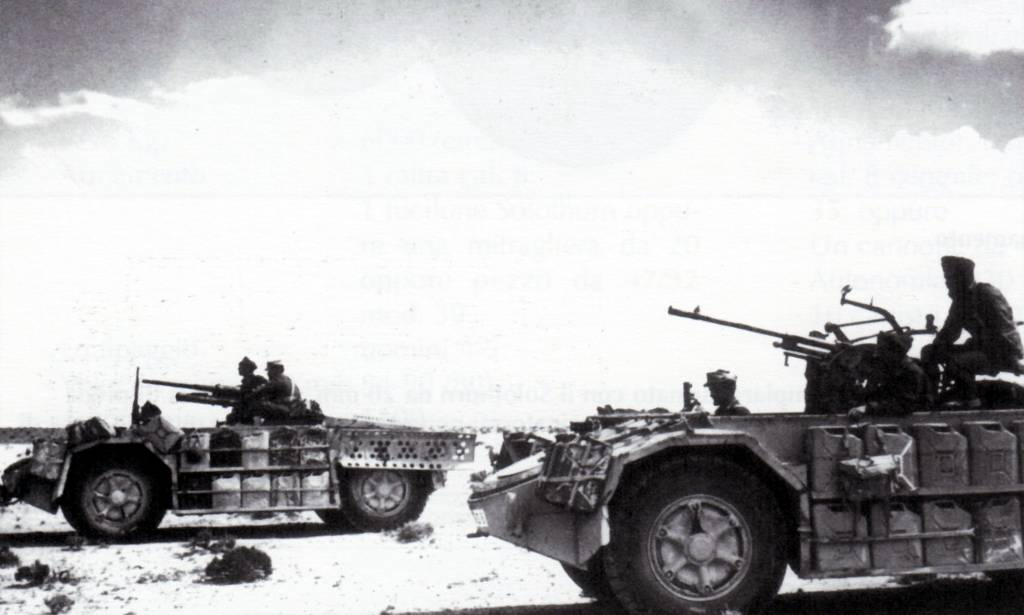
In the foreground an AS42 armed with a Breda 20/65 Mod. 1935 anti-aircraft machine gun; in the background an army with the 47/32 Mod. 1935 anti-tank gun.

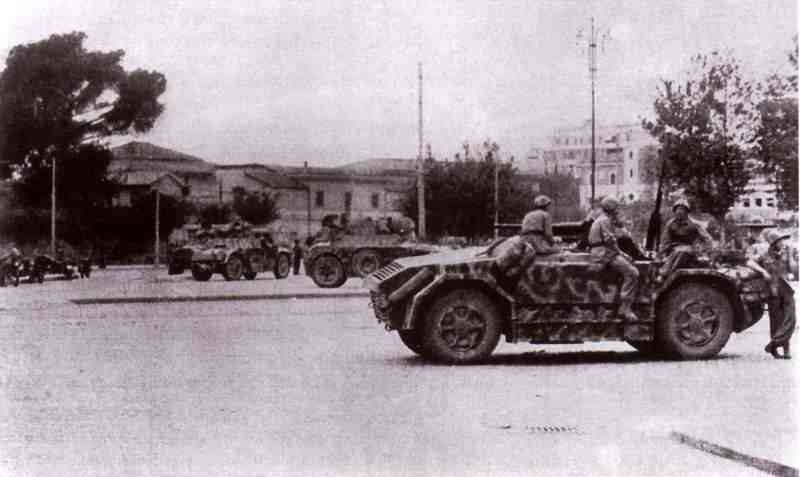
An AS42 Metropolitana of the Motorized Assault Battalion in Rome on 9 September 1943, the eve of the Porta San Paolo clashes.

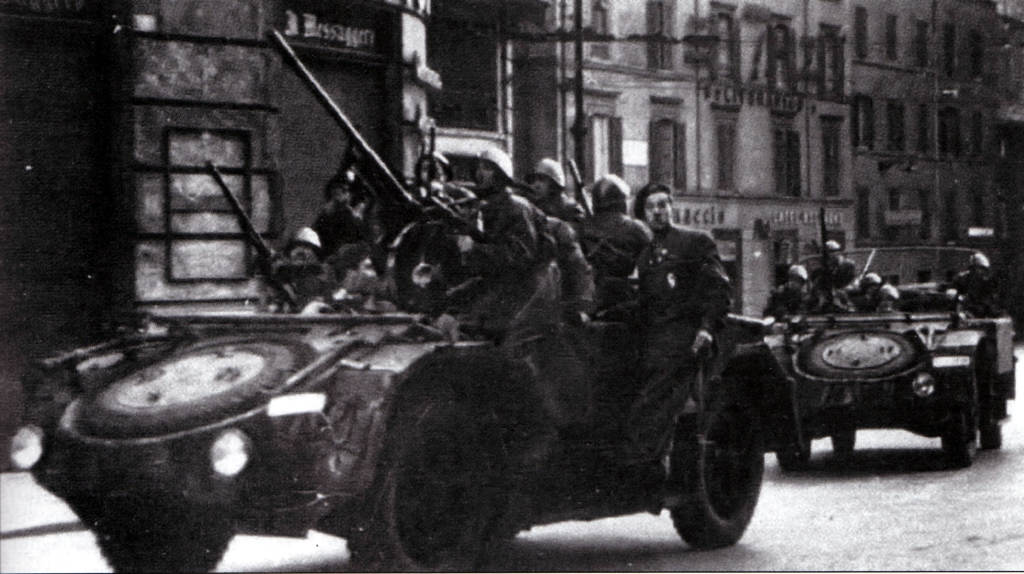
AS42 of the "Barbarigo" Battalion in Rome.

== Armament and armor ==
The main weapon fitted was either a 20 mm (0.79 in) Breda Model 35 autocannon, a 20 mm Solothurn S-18/1000 anti-tank rifle or a 47 mm (1.9 in) Breda M35. They were also fitted with one to three Breda M37 or Breda 38 8 mm machine-guns. The second model did not make use of the S-18/1000. Armor was 17mm thick around the entire chassis, with three 12mm plates of bulletproof glass for the windshield.

== Service ==
From September to November 1942, the first batch of 14 vehicles was delivered to the Regio Esercito. The unit that gave the AS 42 its baptism of fire in November 1942 was the "Raggruppamento Sahariano AS". The good results achieved by the "Raggruppamento Sahariano AS" quickly led to the formation of at least four more "Compagnia Arditi Camionettisti": the 103rd, 112th, 113th, and 123rd.

Saharianas were stationed in North Africa, Sicily, and Rome. The vehicle's low profile allowed it to hide behind desert dunes and wait for the arrival of the enemy unseen, and its great capacity for autonomous action allowed it to chase enemy forces for long periods. The AS.42 participated in the final stages of the Libyan campaign and the entire campaign in Tunisia. It was mainly assigned to aviation companies of the Auto-Saharan Company and the 103rd Battalion.

Surviving vehicles were later used by the 2nd Battalion of the 10th Regiment in the defense of Sicily and southern Italy. The same unit and the Motorized Assault Battalion employed the "Sahariana" and "Metropolitana" models in the defence of Rome on 8 September 1943. After that, a few Saharianas stayed in Northern Italy with Mussolini's Italian Social Republic. Seven vehicles fought on the Eastern Front as part of the 2. Fallschirmjäger Division. They were in service throughout 1944 and 1945 as reconnaissance vehicles on the Eastern Front, in France, Belgium and the Netherlands. In 1943 the Polizia dell'Africa Italiana, including the "Barbarigo" battalion of the Xª MAS Flotilla, used the Sahariana for patrols in Rome. On June 4, 1944 an AS.42 stumbled across an M4 Sherman that sent a shell through the vehicle, destroying both front and rear spare tires.

After the war, seven vehicles were supplied to the Polizia di Stato. They were modified by the removal of weapons, pioneering tools, and Jerry cans, and painted amaranth red. In Udine and Bologna they were used until 1954. An unknown quantity were produced specifically for the Italian State Police in 1946.

== See also ==
- S.P.A. (Società Piemontese Automobili)
