= SPA AS.37 =

Italian military light truck used during World War II

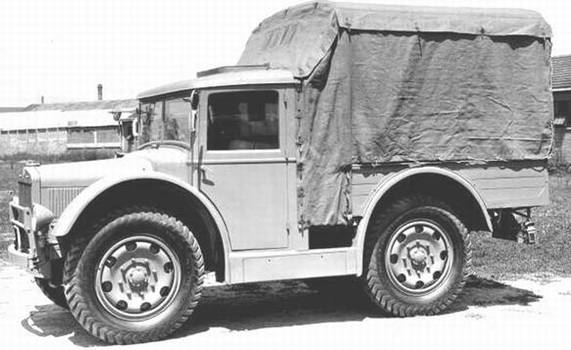
- Type: Light Truck
- Place of origin: Italy

Service history
- Used by: Italy
- Wars: World War II

Production history
- Designed: 1937
- Manufacturer: FIAT
- Produced: 1938-1943
- No. built: at least 802 AS.37 / 200 AP.37

Specifications
- Mass: 3.770 kg
- Length: 4.670 m
- length: wheelbase 2.500 mm
- Width: 2.020 m
- Height: 2.650 m
- Crew: 4
- Engine: SPA petrol 4-cylinder of 4053 cm^{3} 52 PS (38 kW) at 2,000 rpm
- Payload capacity: 1,530 kg
- Transmission: 4 forward 1 reverse
- Suspension: 4x4
- Ground clearance: 390 mm
- Operational range: 870 km
- Maximum speed: 50 km/h

The SPA AS.37 was an Italian military light truck, used during World War II. The AS.37 Autocarro Sahariano was developed from 1937 on the frame of the TL.37 artillery tractor and was especially conceived to be employed in the North African desert. The most significant improvement of this new vehicle was its increased range: 900 km with added water tanks. The A.S.37 could transport 8 men and their equipment in its rear cargo box.

The Autocarro Protetto 37 (A.P.37) was a light armoured personnel carrier variant. At least 200 were built and served in the Balkans and in Italy.

== Overview ==
The military authorities did not judge the problem of desert vehicles urgent. FIAT, supported by Marshal Italo Balbo, Governor of Libya, launched its own initiative which resulted in the A.S.37. The first 200 A.S.37 specimens were sent Libya in 1938 and were assigned to Commando del Sahara Libico and to Autogruppo della Tripolitania. Marshal Balbo wanted to use A.S.37's for the motorization of the Company Sahariane, which was to have 22 vehicles. In March 1942, 584 A.S.37 were in service, and by 30 April 1943 a total of 802 were in service in North Africa. AS.37 crews praised their vehicles for not getting readily stuck in mud and autonomy when carrying out missions, but did feel that the cabin made for a tall silhouette. The German Wehrmacht continued to use the AS.37 after the Armistice of Cassibile in 1943.

The AS 37 (Modificato) (commonly known as the Camionetta Desertica AS.37) started as an unofficial field modification created in 1941 at Hun, Libya. Initially only two vehicles were modified, which consisted of the covered cabin being removed (to reduce visibility), additional fuel and water tanks stored in racks on the sides and front fenders, and a rotating platform installed at the rear in which a cannon was mounted. One vehicle was armed with a Breda 20/65 mod.35 anti-aircraft gun and the other with a Cannone da 47/32 anti-tank gun. The Centro Studi Motorizzazione (Motor Studies Center) built around 11 vehicles based on this idea for the Battaglione d' Assalto Motorizzato (Motorised Assault Battalion) soon after the first two were introduced.

The A.P.37 was a specialized armored carrier variant protected with 6-8mm of armor and usually armed with 1 x 8mm Breda machine gun. Troop carrying capacity was typically 7x troops. The A.P.37 was only deployed to Italy and the Balkans.

== Bibliography ==
- Gli Autoveicoli tattici E logistici del Regio Esercito Italiano fino Al 1943, tomo secondo, Stato Maggiore dell' Esercito, Ufficio Storico, Nicola Pignato & Filippo Cappellano, 2005
- Gli Autoveicoli del Regio Esercito nella Assisted Guerra Mondiale, Nicola Pignato, Storia Militare
- Dal TL 37 all ' A.S. 43, It trattore leggero, the autocarro sahariano, I derivati, artigliery, GMT, Nicola Pignato, Filippo Cappellano
