= Autoblindo Fiat-Ansaldo =

Italian armoured car

Autoblindo 40, Autoblindo 41 and 43
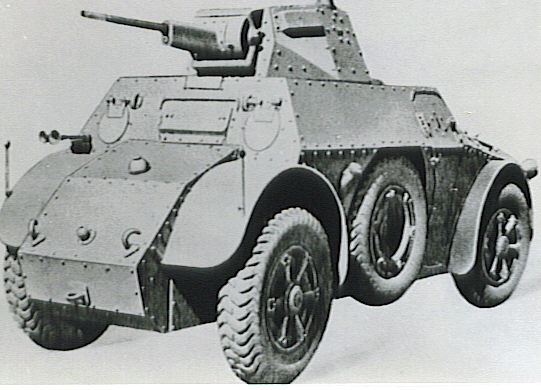
- An Autoblindo 41
- Type: Armoured car
- Place of origin: Kingdom of Italy

Service history
- In service: 1941–1945
- Used by: Kingdom of Italy; Nazi Germany; Italian Social Republic; Italy
- Wars: World War II

Production history
- Designed: 1940
- Manufacturer: Fiat-Ansaldo
- Produced: 1941–1944?
- No. built: 600-700 (AB40: 24 units later partly modernized / AB41: about 600 units / AB43: about 70 units)
- Variants: AS 42 "Camionetta Sahariana", SPA-Viberti AS.42

Specifications
- Mass: 7.518 tonnes
- Length: 5.21 m (17 ft 1 in)
- Width: 1.93 m (6 ft 4 in)
- Height: 2.48 m (8 ft 2 in)
- Crew: 4 (forward driver, rear driver, gunner and commander)
- Armour: 18 mm maximum
- Main armament: AB 40: 2 × 8 mm Breda mod. 38 machine guns; AB 41: 1 × 20 mm Breda mod. 35 autocannon 456 rounds; AB 43: 1 × 47 mm Cannone da 47/32 M35 anti-tank gun 63 rounds
- Secondary armament: 2 × 8 mm Breda mod. 38 machine guns (one in rear hull, one coaxial with main gun); 1,992 rounds
- Engine: AB 40, 41: SPA I6 petrol 88 hp (AB 40) and 120 hp (AB 41)
- Ground clearance: 40 cm (16 in)
- Operational range: 400 km (250 mi)
- Maximum speed: 78 km/h (48 mph) on road

The Autoblindo 40, 41 and 43 (abbreviated AB 40, 41 and 43) were Italian armoured cars produced by Fiat-Ansaldo and which saw service mainly during World War II. Most autoblinde were armed with a 20 mm Breda 35 autocannon and a coaxial 8 mm machine gun in a turret similar to the one fitted to the Fiat L6/40, and another hull mounted rear-facing 8 mm machine gun.

== Development ==
During 1937 the Italian Ministry of War issued specifications for a new armoured car (autoblindomitragliatrice), to fulfil the requirements of both colonial police long range patrols and army reconnaissance units for the new armoured formations. In May 1939 the Fiat-SPA and Ansaldo-Fossati consortium unveiled its armoured car proposal, named Abm 1, at the inauguration of the new Fiat Mirafiori plant near Turin; two prototypes had been built, one outfitted for military and one for police use.

After trials by the Army, in May 1940 the armoured car was standardised, adopted with the official designation Autoblindo 40, and a first batch of 176 vehicles ordered. At the request of the Army the prototype had undergone numerous changes before it was adopted: redesigned front hull, recessed headlamps under armoured covers, improved ventilation, new cast spoked wheels, and flat, shortened mudguards. The first AB 40s were delivered in March 1941.

== Description ==
=== Autoblindo 40 ===
The Autoblindo 40 was built in small numbers in 1940. Armament consisted of two 8 mm machine guns in a turret. During production a need for heavier armament was envisioned and so the AB 40 was redesigned as the AB 41 which was the same vehicle except for a new turret with a 20 mm Breda 20/65 mod.35 autocannon. Most of the 24 AB 40s that had been built were then converted to AB 41s.

=== Autoblindo 41 ===
The Autoblindo 41 (named after its first year of production, 1941) was a further development of the machine gun armed AB 40. Made with an all-riveted construction, the AB 41 had four-wheel drive and a four wheel steering system that proved troublesome. The spare wheels fitted to its sides were free to rotate, thus helping the vehicle over rough terrain and allowing it to drive over higher obstacles. It could also be fitted with wheels that would allow it to run on railway tracks and some were modified further to better serve in this role, with the addition of sand boxes and rail guards to deflect objects from the rails. This version was designated AB 41 Ferroviaria.

It had six forward gears and four reverse gears, with a driving position at the front and one in the rear, so two crew members were drivers. Overall the AB 40/41 family was well thought out, with a top speed of over 70 km/h (45 mph), good armour (15 mm on the front plates) and good road and cross-country performance, but there were some examples of poor detail design like difficult access to the powerplant, an unprotected fuel tank, one-man turret, exposed traverse gear and lack of an interior bulkhead separating the engine and crew compartments. Nevertheless, the AB 41 was considered a good vehicle and one of the best armoured cars of its era. Its chassis was later used as a basis for the SPA-Viberti AS.42. About 550 vehicles were built in all.

=== Autoblindo 43 ===
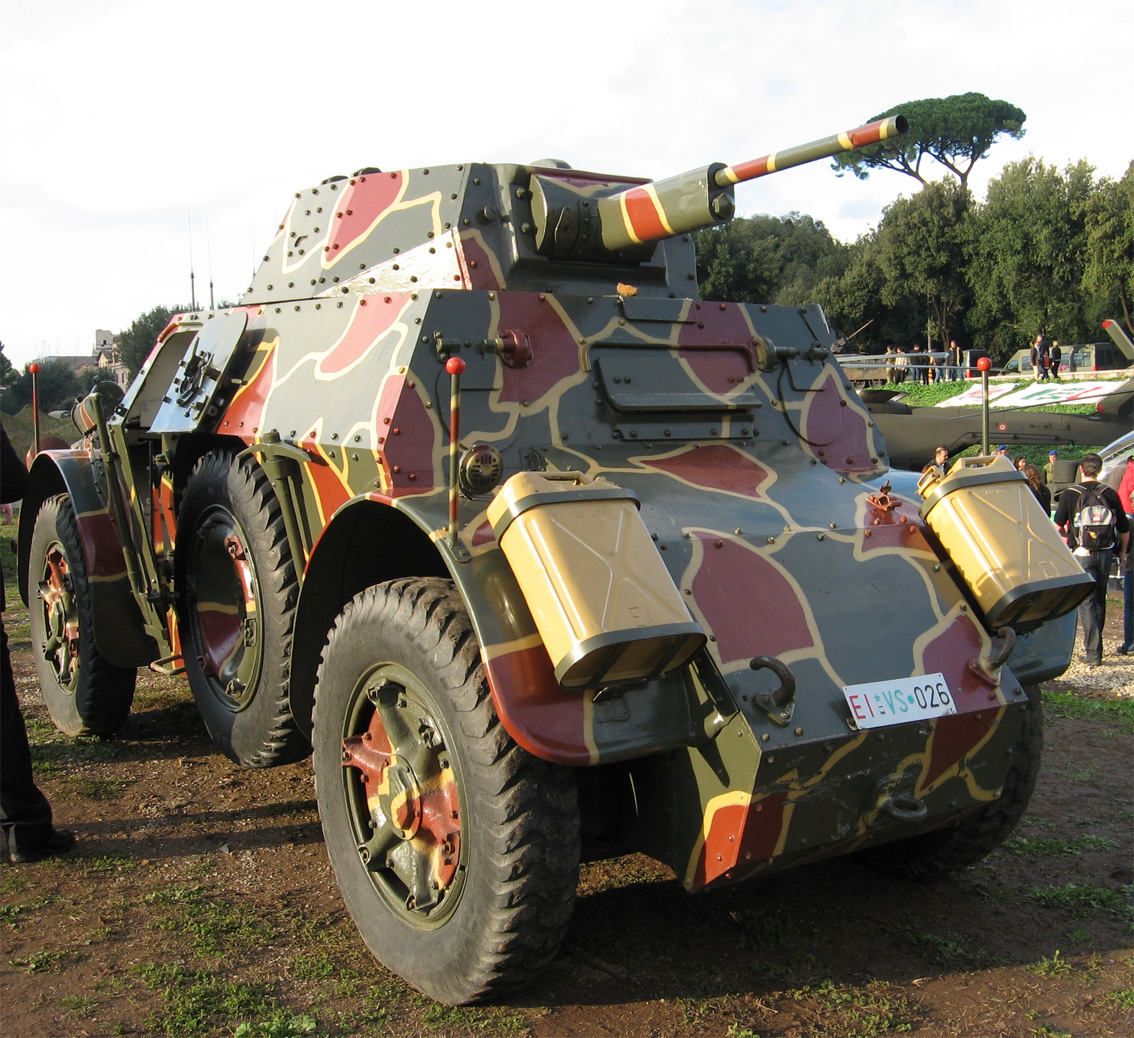

The Italians planned to upgrade the AB 41 with a 47 mm anti-tank gun as the AB 43, but those plans were disrupted by the Armistice of Cassibile in September 1943.

== Combat history ==
During World War II, the AB 41 operated in North Africa, Yugoslavia, Italy, Hungary, and on the Eastern Front. Italy issued the AB 41 only to cavalry, Italian Africa Police (PAI) and Bersaglieri units. The AB 41 was also organized into reconnaissance battalions (or cavalry groups) of three or four companies each. Each armoured car company consisted of three armoured car platoons of four armoured cars each, one armoured car for the company commander, and one armoured car for the company HQ (Headquarters) totalling 42 or 56 AB 41s in all. Each fully equipped independent armoured car company proved highly suitable for reconnaissance, escort and security duties.

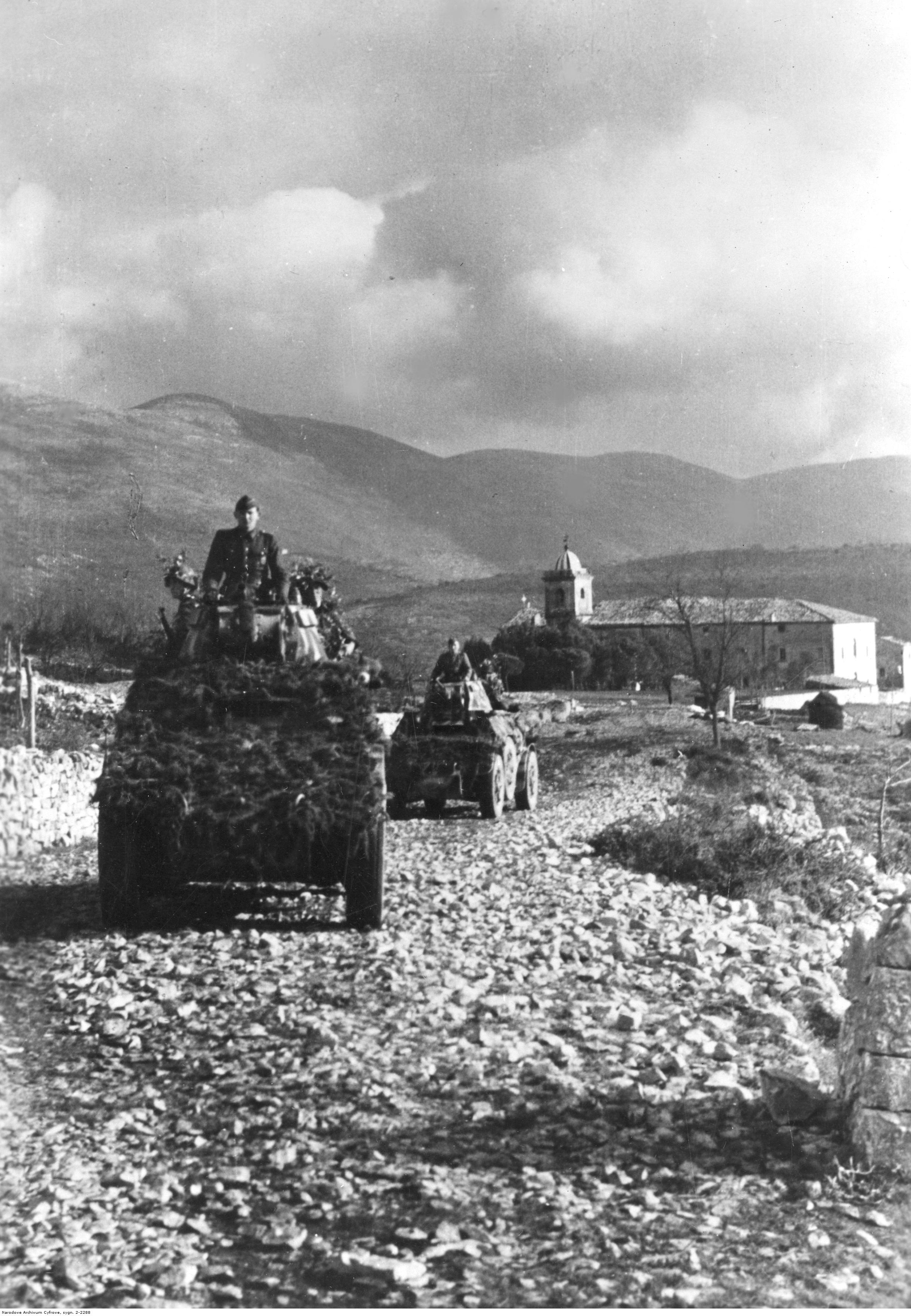
German reconnaissance troop with Autoblinda AB 41 armored cars in front of a church in southern Italy.

The AB 41 could be quickly adapted for operation on any terrain. Sand tires could be fitted for desert work and it could run on railway tracks with special bogies and extra lights. The rail-converted vehicles were primarily used in anti-partisan patrols in the Balkans. After the Armistice the Germans confiscated some 57 AB 41s and also built 120 more. The German designation was Panzerspähwagen AB41 201(i).

== Users ==
The Autoblinde were used by the following countries and organisations:

- Australia
- Croatia
- Free France
  - Army of Africa
  - French Forces of the Interior
- France
  - French Army
  - National Gendarmerie
- Germany
  - Wehrmacht
- Greece
  - Greek People's Liberation Army
- Kingdom of Italy
  - Regio Esercito
  - Polizia dell'Africa Italiana
  - Italian Co-Belligerent Army
- Italy
  - Esercito Nazionale Repubblicano
- Italian partisans
- Italy
  - Carabinieri
  - Polizia di Stato
  - Reggimento genio ferrovieri (Esercito Italiano)
- Poland
  - Polish Armed Forces in the West
- Romania (see Romanian armored cars during World War II)
- United Kingdom (evaluation only)
- Yugoslavian partisans
- Socialist Federal Republic of Yugoslavia

== See also ==
- AB md. 41, a similar Romanian vehicle
- Fiat-Ansaldo AB 43 , Vehicle in Museo Roma Italy

Test drive AUTOBLINDO ANSALDO AB 43
