= AB md. 41 =

Romanian prototype armored car

Autoblindat model 1941
- Type: Armored car
- Place of origin: Kingdom of Romania

Service history
- Wars: World War II

Production history
- Manufacturer: Reșița works
- Produced: 1941
- No. built: 1 prototype

Specifications
- Main armament: 1 x 37 mm gun (probably Škoda)

The AB md. 41 (Autoblindat model 1941) was a Romanian-produced armored car prototype from World War II. It was produced by the Reșița works just before Romania had entered the war. The vehicle's main armament was a Czechoslovak-produced 37 mm gun (probably by Škoda). The project didn't pass the prototype stage.

== See also ==
=== Comparable vehicles ===
- France: Gendron-Somua AMR 39
- Germany: Sd.Kfz. 234/1
- Italy: Autoblindo Fiat-Ansaldo
- United Kingdom: Coventry armoured car
- United States: T17E1 Staghound
