= TL.37 =

Italian military artillery tractor

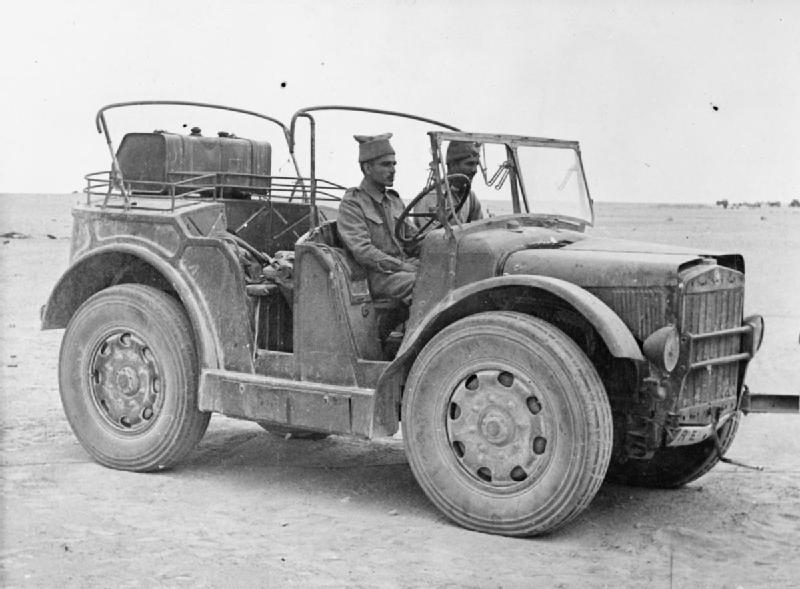
- Indian troops drive a captured Fiat-SPA TL.37 (Dec. 1941)
- Type: Light truck
- Place of origin: Kingdom of Italy

Service history
- Used by: Italy
- Wars: World War II

Production history
- Designed: 1937
- Manufacturer: SPA
- Produced: 1938-?

Specifications
- Mass: 3,560 kg (7,850 lb)
- Length: 4.13 m (13 ft 7 in)
- Width: 1.83 m (6 ft 0 in)
- Height: 2.18 m (7 ft 2 in)
- Crew: 4
- Engine: 4 cylinder of 4,053 cm^{3} developing 52 hp at 2,000 rpm
- Payload capacity: 1,530 kg
- Transmission: 4 forward 1 reverse
- Suspension: 4x4
- Ground clearance: 345 mm
- Operational range: 170 km
- Maximum speed: 38 km/h

The TL.37 was an Italian military artillery tractor of World War II. It was manufactured by SPA (Società Piemontese Automobili), an Italian car maker that was a subsidiary of Fiat.

== Development and history ==
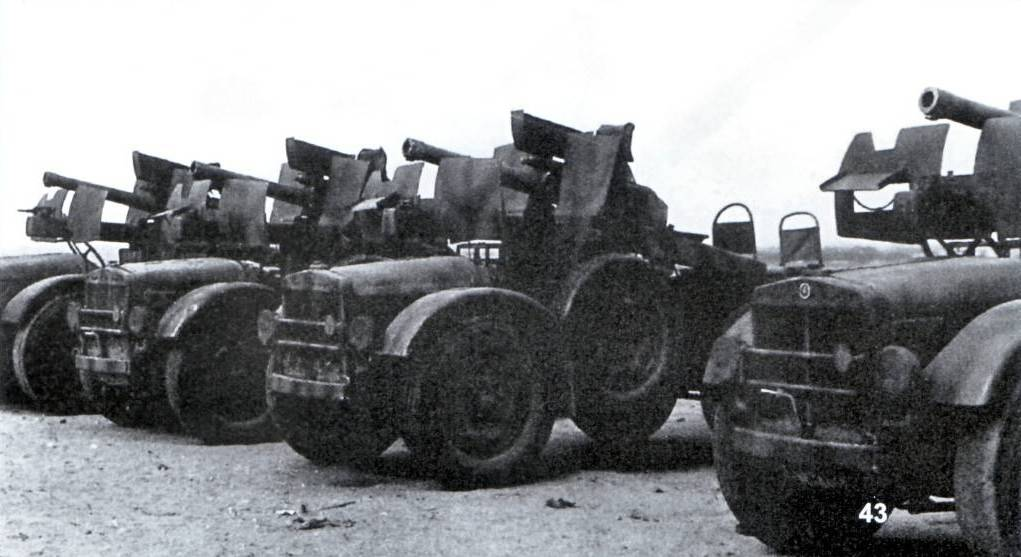
Several, self-propelled gun variant TL.37's

While the Pavesi P4/100 artillery tractor was popular and was produced in large numbers, it was considered bulky and the suspension inadequate for rough terrain and Spanish roads. A request by the Royal Italian Army was placed in 1935 for a new artillery tractor with the specifications that it have four-wheel drive, accept either solid rubber or inflatable tires, a crew of six, be able to climb a 60 degree slope, and have the capacity to tow up to 100mm artillery pieces at 40 km/h across rough terrain. Fiat-S.P.A. met this call with the TLa (Trattore Leggero per artiglieria). In 1937 the TLa competed against a design from Breda Meccanica Bresciana and won, so was adopted and renamed the TL.37 with production beginning in October 1937. 24 units were sent to Libya for extended testing in 1938, towing Cannone da 75/27 modello 06 guns and 100-round ammunition trailers, where performance was found to be satisfactory. On 1 March, 1942, 1,021 tractors were in service with 1,021 on order. By 30 April, 1943, 2,267 were in service with a further 479 on order. In 1941 captured units were evaluated by Australian troops, who considered the TL.37 as the best artillery tractor being used in North Africa.

Hungary purchased an unknown quantity of TL.37s, and after the Italian Armistice in 1943 they continued to be used by German forces as well as the Italian Social Republic. Post–war, it was in service until 1948 with the Italian Navy.

A self-propelled gun variant was also built, with a Cannone da 75/27 modello 11 fitted at the rear. The TL.37 was also the basis for a general–purpose truck, the Fiat–SPA AS.37, and two armoured cars the Fiat–SPA S37 (Fiat-SPA Autoprotetto S37) and the Fiat-SPA AS43.

== Variants and further developments ==
- TL.37 Libia - Equipped with rigid Artiglio tires, 2.5 ton winch, and additional oil and air filters for desert use.
- TL.37 Sahariana - Equipped with additional fuel tanks.
- TL.37 Coloniale - Used by engineers and equipped with additional fuel tanks.
- TL.37 Pontiere - For constructing pontoon bridges, 3.5 ton winch.
- AS.37 - Truck based upon the TL.37
- Autocannone da 75/27 su FIAT-SPA T.L.37 - Self-propelled gun created by mating a TL.37 with a Cannone da 75/27 modello 11.
- S.37 Auroprotetto - Armored personnel carrier.

== Bibliography ==
- Gli Autoveicoli tattici E logistici del Regio Esercito Italiano fino Al 1943, tomo secondo, Stato Maggiore dell' Esercito, Ufficio Storico, Nicola Pignato & Filippo Cappellano, 2005
- Gli Autoveicoli del Regio Esercito nella Assisted Guerra Mondiale, Nicola Pignato, Storia Militare
- Dal TL 37 all ' A.S. 43, It trattore leggero, the autocarro sahariano, I derivati, artigliery, GMT, Nicola Pignato, Filippo Cappellano
- Trattore leggero SPA TL 37, Notiziario Modellistico GMT 2/91, Nicola Pignato (pp. 4–15)
