= Fiat 634 =

Italian military heavy truck

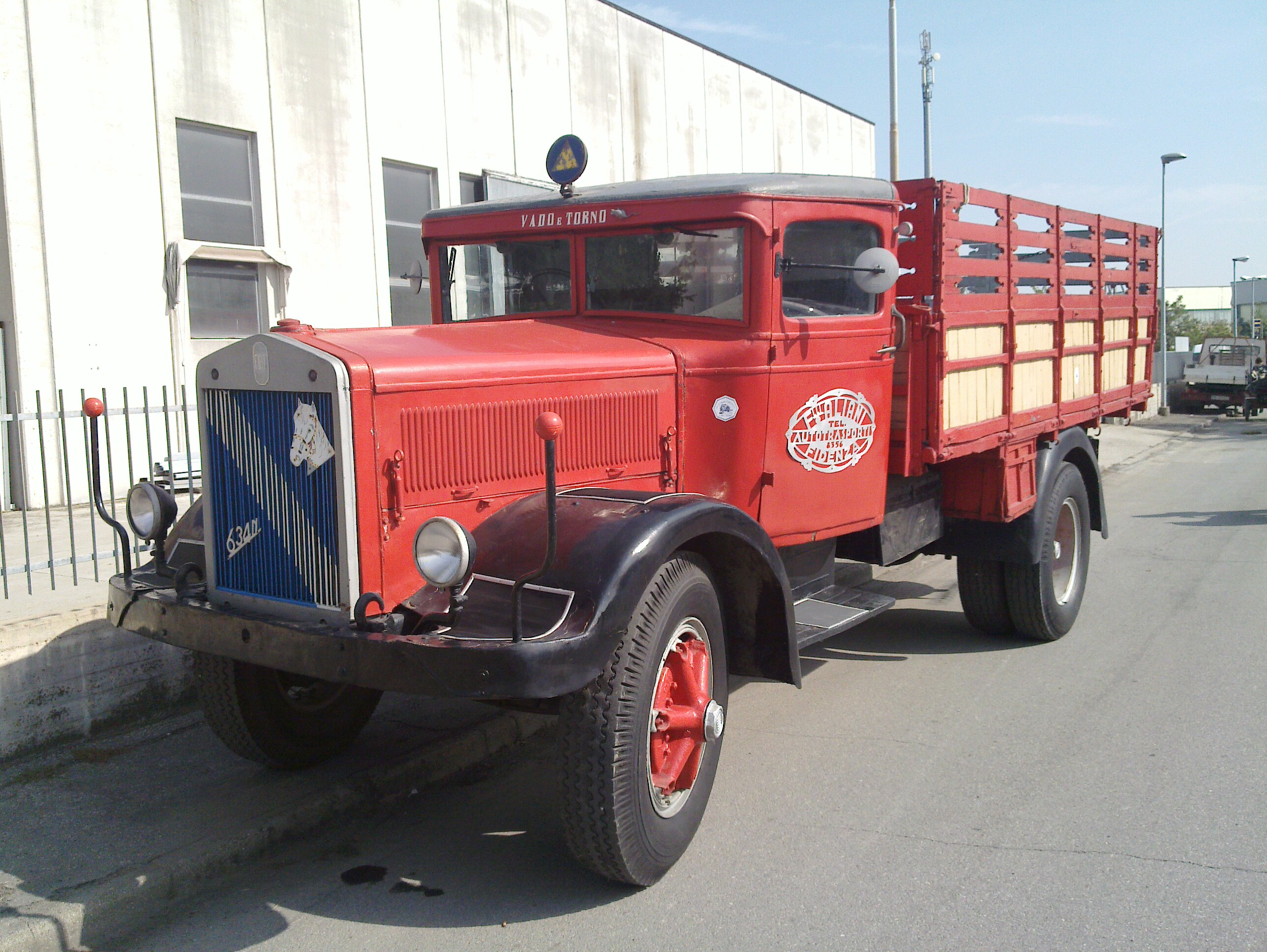
The FIAT 634N

The FIAT 634N (Nafta [diesel]) is the military variant of the civilian FIAT 632 heavy truck manufactured by Italian manufacturer FIAT from 1931 to 1939.

It was used by the Regio Esercito units to transport troops or supplies.

== Specification ==
The 634N was initially launched with the Fiat 355 engine, a 6-cylinder 8.3-litre (8312 cc) diesel engine producing 75 hp (56 kW). In 1933, the engine was upgraded to the Fiat 355C unit, a slightly larger 8.4-litre (8355 cc) engine producing 80 hp (60 kW).

- Height: 3.24 metres (10.6 ft)
- Length: 7.434 metres (24.39 ft)
- Width: 2.40 metres (7 ft 10 in)
- Maximum Speed: 40 km/h (25 mph)
- Maximum Payload: 7,640 kg (16,843 lb)
