= Battle sled =

Tank-towed armoured sled from World War II

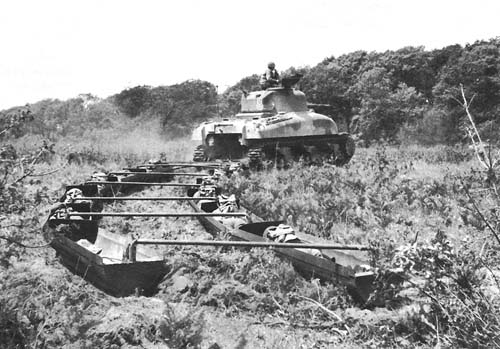
M4 Sherman tank pulling battle sleds in a demonstration at Nettuno, Italy, in 1944

A battle sled (battle sledge, tank sledge or armoured sledge) is a protective device dragged behind an armored vehicle that is used to carry infantry closer to the front lines of a battle zone. They were used by multiple combatants during World War II.

== United States ==
The United States Army trialed battle sleds during the World War II Battle of Anzio. General John W. O'Daniel, commander of the 3rd Infantry Division, ordered torpedoes to be cut in half for the purpose. Six torpedo halves, each carrying one prone infantryman, were then chained together into a unit, with one tank pulling two such chains. A total of 360 such sleds were manufactured and used during the Battle of Anzio.

The sleds were disliked by the infantrymen, who "felt like 'dead ducks'" in them. Their use was also impeded by rough ground and the loss of the tanks pulling the chains of sleds. O'Daniel himself viewed the combat trials as "inconclusive". Salvaged sleds were used later in the invasion of Southern France.

== German battle sled ==
A Stug III tows a sled with infantry

In World War II, Nazi Germany built large battle sleds that were towed behind an assault gun. These large sleds were less likely to tip over on hills. They were tested in the winter in snow and ice in Tirol, Austria. Like the US sleds, few saw combat. The sleds were towed often by the Stug III, an assault gun or a Panzer III tank. The goal was the infantry could quickly unload from the sleds and help the assault gun when needed.

== Russian battle sled ==
Russian battle sled used in the Winter War in the winter battles in Karelian Isthmus against Finland

In World War II, the Soviet Union used armored battle sleds in Winter War in winter battles in the Karelian Isthmus against Finland. The sleds were smaller with one line of infantry behind an armored plate towed by a tank. The armored sleds carrying infantrymen helped to resolve the problem of deep snow slowing down the foot soldiers.

== United Kingdom ==
Testing a Royal Engineers troop armoured sledge (on left side), not used in the war. On right side, a Churchill Crocodile fuel tank

The United Kingdom tested armoured sledges, but did not use them in battle for troops. A Churchill tank was used to tow an experimental armored sled in the test. The AVRE trailers test was done by the Armoured Vehicle Royal Engineers. United Kingdom battle sleds were used to move battle stores and ammunition. Centaur tanks and M7 Priest were used to tow the ammunition porpoise sledge at the Normandy landings on Juno Beach. The porpoise sledge had a low profile and was stored under the tanks on the landing crafts. The porpoise sledge has water tight storage bays for the ammunition.

== See also ==
- Hobart's Funnies
- NKL-26
- Aerosledge
