= Tupolev A-3 Aerosledge =

Soviet amphibious transport vehicle

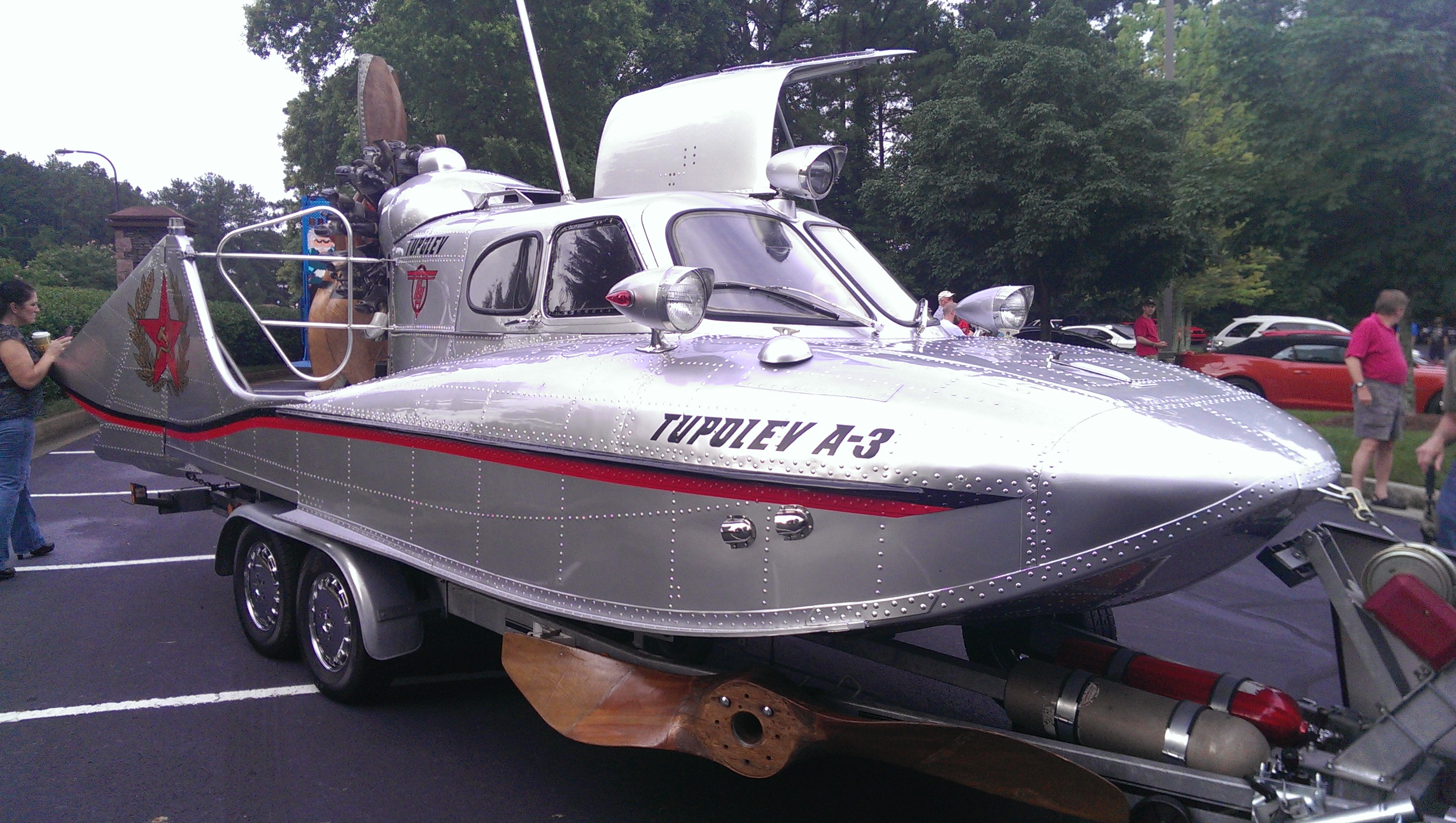
- N007 in July 2013

Class overview
- Name: A-3 Aerosledge
- Builders: Tupolev Design Bureau
- Operators: Soviet Union
- Completed: Over 800

General characteristics
- Type: Aerosled
- Tonnage: 1,779 lbs
- Length: 13 feet 2 inches
- Beam: 7 feet
- Height: 4 feet 5 inches (cabin)
- Draft: 2 inches
- Propulsion: 1 AI-14R five-cylinder radial engine producing 260 horsepower and driving a single 6 foot 2 inch twin-bladed propeller
- Speed: 74.6 mph (snow), 40.4 mph (water)
- Capacity: 1,433 lbs (snow) 661 lbs (water)
- Troops: 4
- Crew: 1

The Tupolev A-3 Aerosledge is an all-metal amphibious aerosledge, designed to transport passengers and light freight in remote areas of the Soviet Union. Officially known as the A-3 "Hope" ("Nadezhda" in Russian), it uses a single pusher propeller mounted behind the enclosed cabin to propel the craft over snow or water. A prototype was constructed in 1961, and the A-3 entered into production in 1964.

== Survivors ==
- A 1978 A-3, registered N007 (possibly the only one imported to the U.S.), was offered at a Barrett-Jackson auction in 2007. This specific A-3 was upgraded to a 9-cylinder Vedeneyev M14P engine, which drove the standard twin parallel-rotating propellers. This A-3 was sold at Barrett-Jackson's 2015 Scottsdale auction for $220,000 and again at the 2020 edition of the same auction for $143,000.

== See also ==
- Aerosani
- Airboat
- KRISTI snowcat
