= Hobart's Funnies =

Modified tanks first used in the Normandy Landings

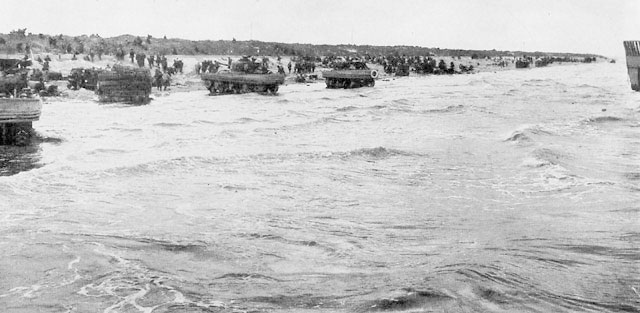
- Amphibious DD tanks await blowing of breaches in the sea wall on Utah Beach. This photo was taken shortly after H Hour.
- Type: Modified tank variations
- Place of origin: United Kingdom

Service history
- In service: 1944–1945
- Used by: 79th Armoured Division or by specialists from the Royal Engineers
- Wars: World War II

Production history
- Designer: Various
- Designed: 1941–1944
- Manufacturer: Various

Hobart's Funnies is the nickname given to a number of specialist armoured fighting vehicles derived from tanks operated during the Second World War by units of the 79th Armoured Division of the British Army or by specialists from the Royal Engineers.

They were designed in light of problems that more standard tanks experienced during the amphibious Dieppe Raid, so that the new models would be able to overcome the problems of the planned invasion of Normandy. These tanks played a major part on the Commonwealth beaches during the landings. They were forerunners of the modern combat engineering vehicle and took their nickname from the 79th Division's commander, Major-General Percy Hobart.

The vehicles converted were chiefly Churchill tanks and American-supplied M4 Sherman tanks.

== History ==
Plans to invade continental Europe were completely revised after the failure of the raid on Dieppe in 1942. Allied units in Normandy would need to overcome terrain, obstacles and coastal fortifications if the invasion were to succeed. General Sir Alan Brooke, Chief of the Imperial General Staff decided in 1943 to create special units and assigned responsibility to armoured warfare expert Percy Hobart for the development of vehicles and training crews to use them in action.

Many of the ideas had already been tried, tested or were in experimental development both by Britain and other nations. For example, the Scorpion flail tank, a modified Matilda tank, had already been used during the North African campaign to clear paths through German minefields. Soviet T-34 tanks had been modified with mine-rollers. Close-support tanks, bridgelayers, and fascine carriers had been developed elsewhere also. However, the Funnies were the largest and most elaborate collection of engineering vehicles available.

By early 1944, Hobart could demonstrate to Generals Eisenhower and Montgomery a brigade each of swimming Duplex Drive (DD) amphibious tanks, "Crab" mine clearers, and AVRE tanks along with a regiment of Churchill Crocodile flame-thrower tanks.

Montgomery considered that the US forces should use them. A third of the "funnies" were offered to the Americans of all the vehicles available, but take-up was minimal. Eisenhower was in favour of the DD tanks but left the decision on the others to General Bradley. The Americans were reluctant to make use of the funnies because it was thought that they would require specialised training and an additional support organisation, and those based on the Churchill tank would entail the logistical complexity of adding another tank model to their inventory.

Bradley did request 25 flail tanks and 100 Churchill Crocodiles shortly after the demonstration in February 1944, and the British War Office agreed to supply them as well as British-crewed AVREs. However, there was judged to be insufficient time to produce the vehicles and train crews for the Normandy invasion, so on the day American forces were limited to DD tanks and their own Sherman bulldozer tanks and armoured bulldozers. 42 Assault Brigade, instead of supporting the US beaches, became a reserve for the British and Canadian beaches.

Considering results of the US landing on Omaha Beach, Bradley's decision has been criticised as it was felt that use of the range of "Funnies" could have saved American lives. After D-Day, American forces did make limited use of the Sherman Crab mine-clearing tank.

== Designs ==
The majority of the designs were modified forms of the Churchill tank or the Sherman tank. Both were available in large numbers. The Churchill had good (though slow) cross-country performance, heavy armour, and a roomy interior. The Sherman's mechanical reliability was valued.

Among the many specialist vehicles and their attachments were:

The Churchill Crocodile was a Churchill tank modified by the fitting of a flame-thrower in place of the hull machine gun. An armoured trailer, towed behind the tank, carried 400 Imperial gallons (1,800 litres) of fuel. The flamethrower had a range of over 120 yards (110 metres), far greater than man-portable units. Regarded as a powerful psychological weapon, this flame tank proved highly effective at clearing bunkers, trenches and other German fortifications.

The main vehicle in the 79th Armoured Division was the Assault Vehicle Royal Engineers (AVRE) which was a Churchill tank adapted for attacking defensive fortifications. The Churchill's main gun was replaced by a spigot mortar (known as "Petard") that fired a 40lb (18 kg) HE-filled projectile nicknamed the "flying dustbin" around 150 yards (140 m). This was capable of destroying concrete obstacles such as roadblocks and bunkers. The mortar had to be reloaded externally by opening a hatch and sliding a round into the mortar tube from the hull. The crew of six were drawn from the Royal Engineers, except for the driver who came from the Royal Armoured Corps. One of the RE crew was a demolitions NCO sapper responsible for priming the "flying dustbin" as well as leading or supervising when they dismounted from the tank (which was easily done through the side hatches) to place demolition charges ("Wade" charges). Various attachments were designed to be carried and operated by the AVRE to enhance its capabilities. This equipment included

- Bobbin: A reel of 10-foot (3.0 m) wide canvas cloth reinforced with steel poles carried in front of the tank and unrolled onto the ground to form a "path", so that following vehicles (and the deploying vehicle itself) would not sink into the soft ground of the beaches during the amphibious landing.
- Fascine: A bundle of wooden poles or rough brushwood lashed together with wires carried in front of the tank that could be released to fill a ditch or form a step. Metal pipes in the centre of the fascine allowed water to flow through.
- Small Box Girder: An assault bridge that was carried in front of the tank and could be dropped to span a 30-foot (9.1 m) gap in 30 seconds.
- Bullshorn Plough: A mine plough intended to excavate the ground in front of the tank to expose and detonate any land mines.
- "Double Onion": Two large demolition charges on a metal frame that could be placed against a concrete wall and detonated from a safe distance. The tank could place demolition charges at heights up to 12 feet. The tank was driven against a wall, and the framework was lowered into the ground against the wall. The tank then backed up 100 feet, laying out an electric detonating cable. The explosives were then detonated by the tank driver. It was the successor to the single-charge device "Carrot". It was also called the "Jones Onion". A larger development was called "Goat".

Other vehicles included

- ARK (Armoured Ramp Carrier): A turretless Churchill tank that had extendable ramps at each end; other vehicles could drive up the ramps and over the vehicle to scale obstacles, effectively using it as a mobile bridge.
- The Churchill great eastern ramp
- Crab: A modified Sherman tank equipped with a mine flail, a rotating cylinder of weighted chains that exploded mines in the path of the tank.
- DD tank (from "Duplex Drive"): An amphibious version of the Sherman created by fitting M4A1 and M4A4 with a large watertight canvas housing. This increased displacement so the tank was able to float and reach the shore after being launched from a landing craft up to several miles from the beach. They were intended to give support to the first waves of infantry that attacked the beaches. A Valentine tank version was developed first but used for training only.
- Armoured bulldozer: A conventional Caterpillar D6 or D7 bulldozer fitted with armour to protect the driver and the engine. Their job was to clear the invasion beaches of obstacles and to make roads accessible by clearing rubble and filling in bomb craters. Though frequently said to have been converted by UK Caterpillar importer Jack Olding & Company Ltd of Hatfield, these vehicles were built complete with armoured cab and bulldozer blade by Caterpillar itself in the USA.
- Centaur Bulldozer: A Centaur tank with the turret removed and fitted with a simple winch-operated bulldozer blade. These were produced because of a need for a well-armoured obstacle-clearing vehicle that, unlike a conventional bulldozer, would be fast enough to keep up with tank formations. They were not used on D-Day but were issued to the 79th Armoured Division in Belgium during the latter part of 1944.
- Canal Defence Light: A powerful carbon-arc searchlight carried on several types of tank inside a modified turret. The name of the device was deliberately inaccurate in order to help keep it secret; its true purpose was to illuminate enemy positions during a night attack, providing light and dazzling defenders. It was designed to allow light to flood out of a comparatively small slit in the armour, minimising the chance of damage by enemy fire. This was not used on D-Day, but was used during the November 1944 Operation Clipper attack on the Geilenkirchen salient to create indirect artificial daylight. The Americans tested the CDL at the secret Camp Bouse in Bouse, Arizona.

The 79th also used the LVT "Buffalo", the British name for the American LVT2 and LVT4 lightly armoured amphibious landing vehicles. The latter had a ramp to ease loading of cargo. They were used in several operations, including the crossing of the Rhine.

== Gallery ==
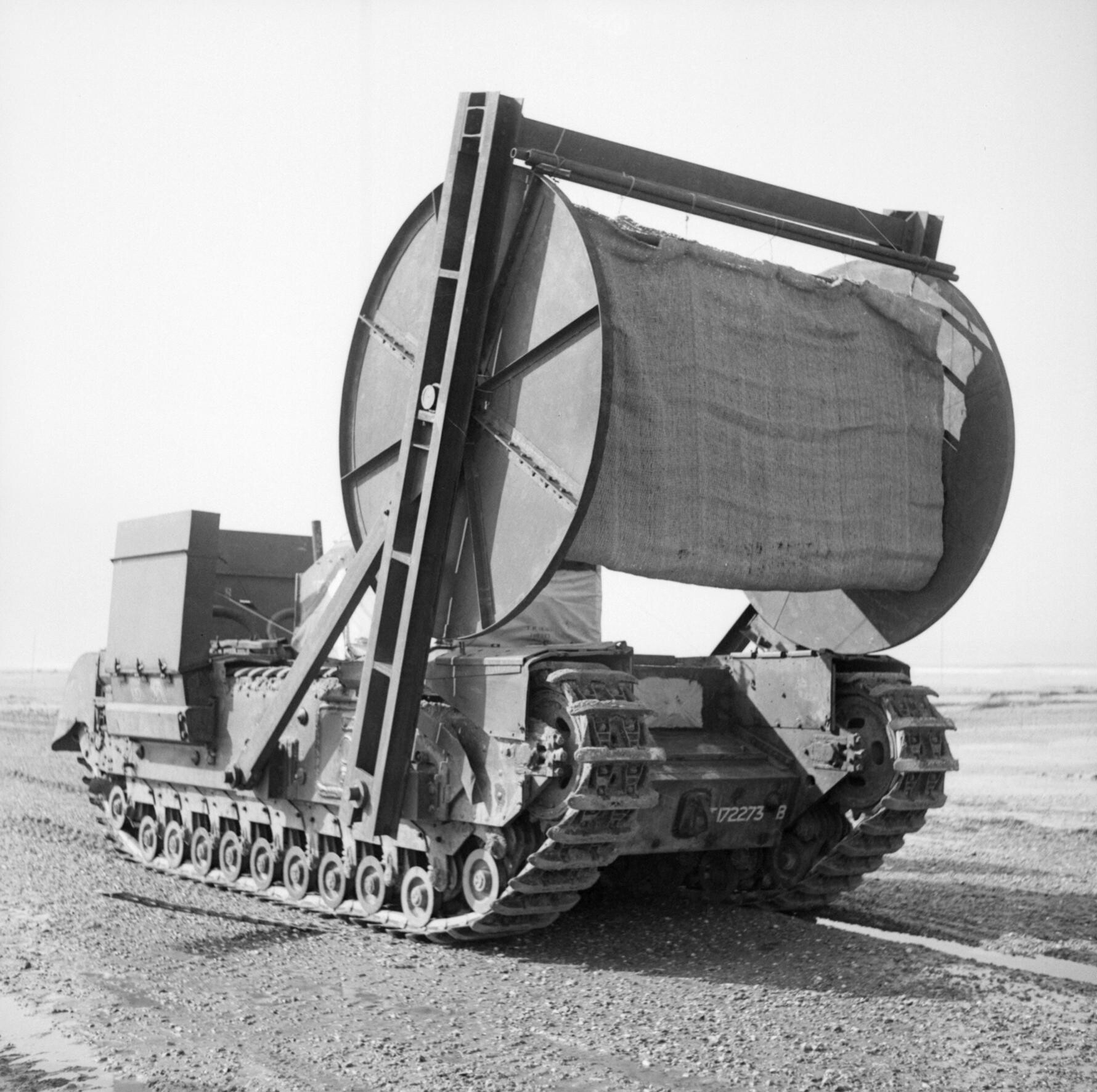
Churchill AVRE with a "bobbin"

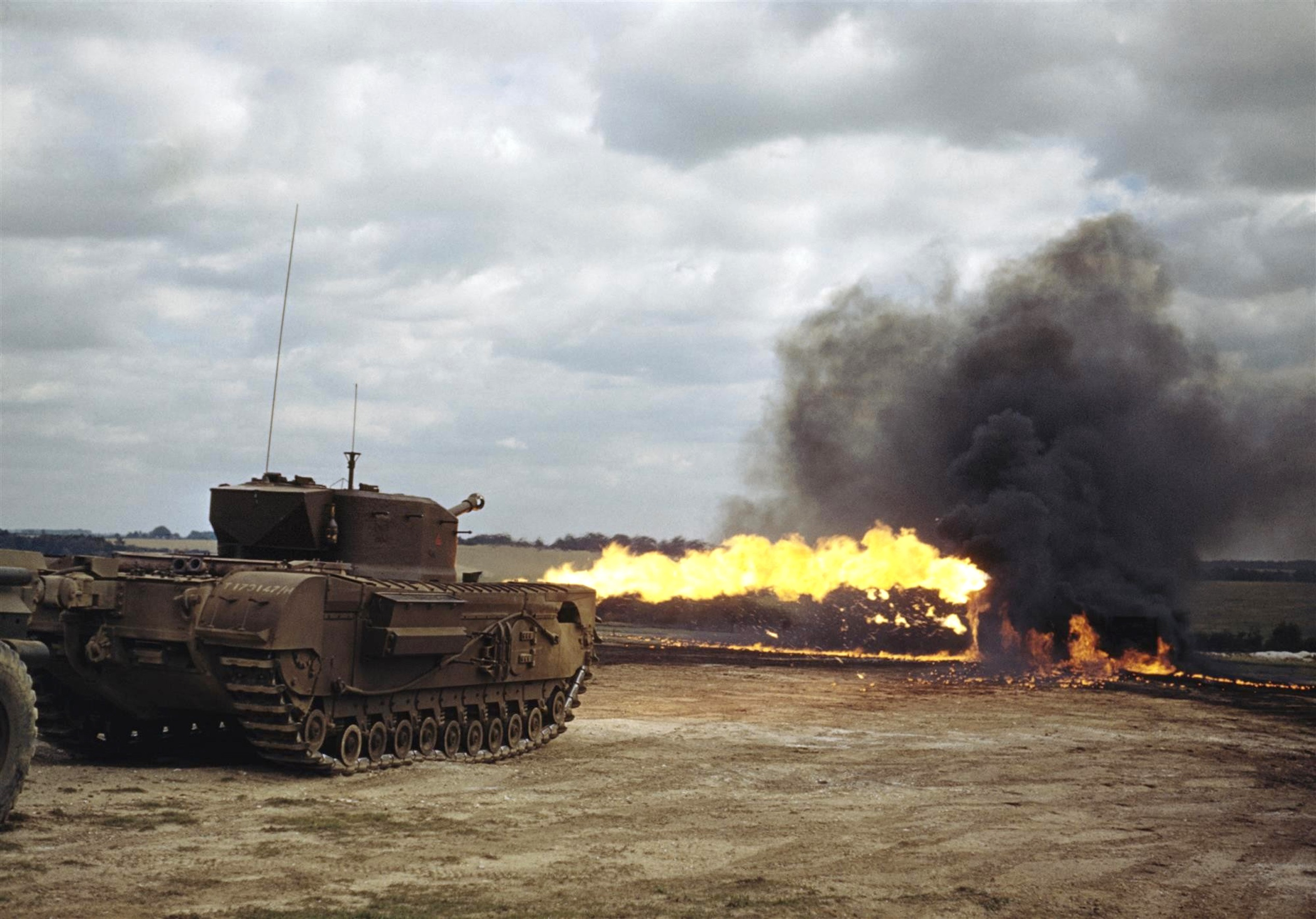
Churchill Crocodile in action

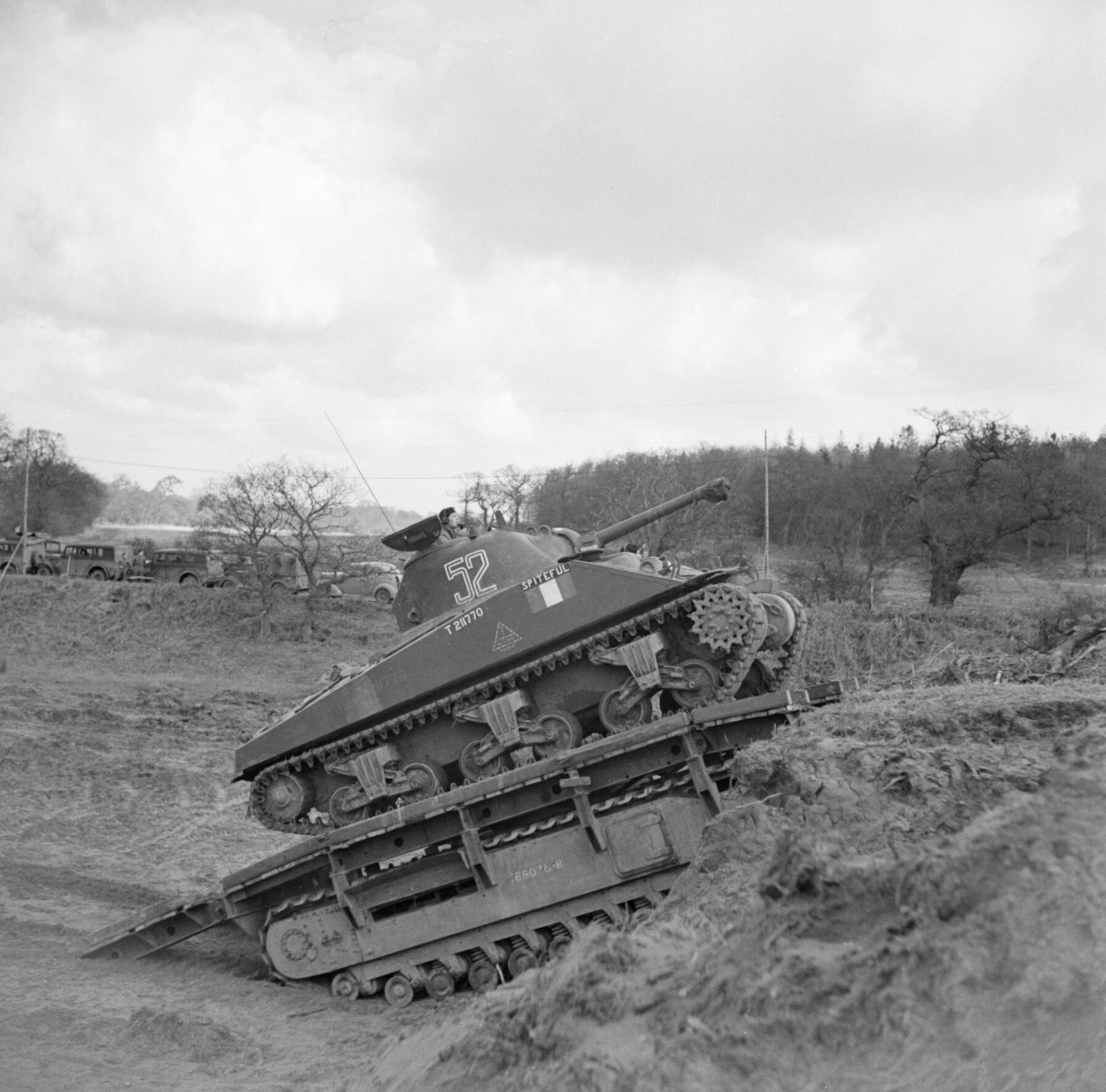
A Sherman tank uses a Churchill Ark to climb an escarpment during a training exercise

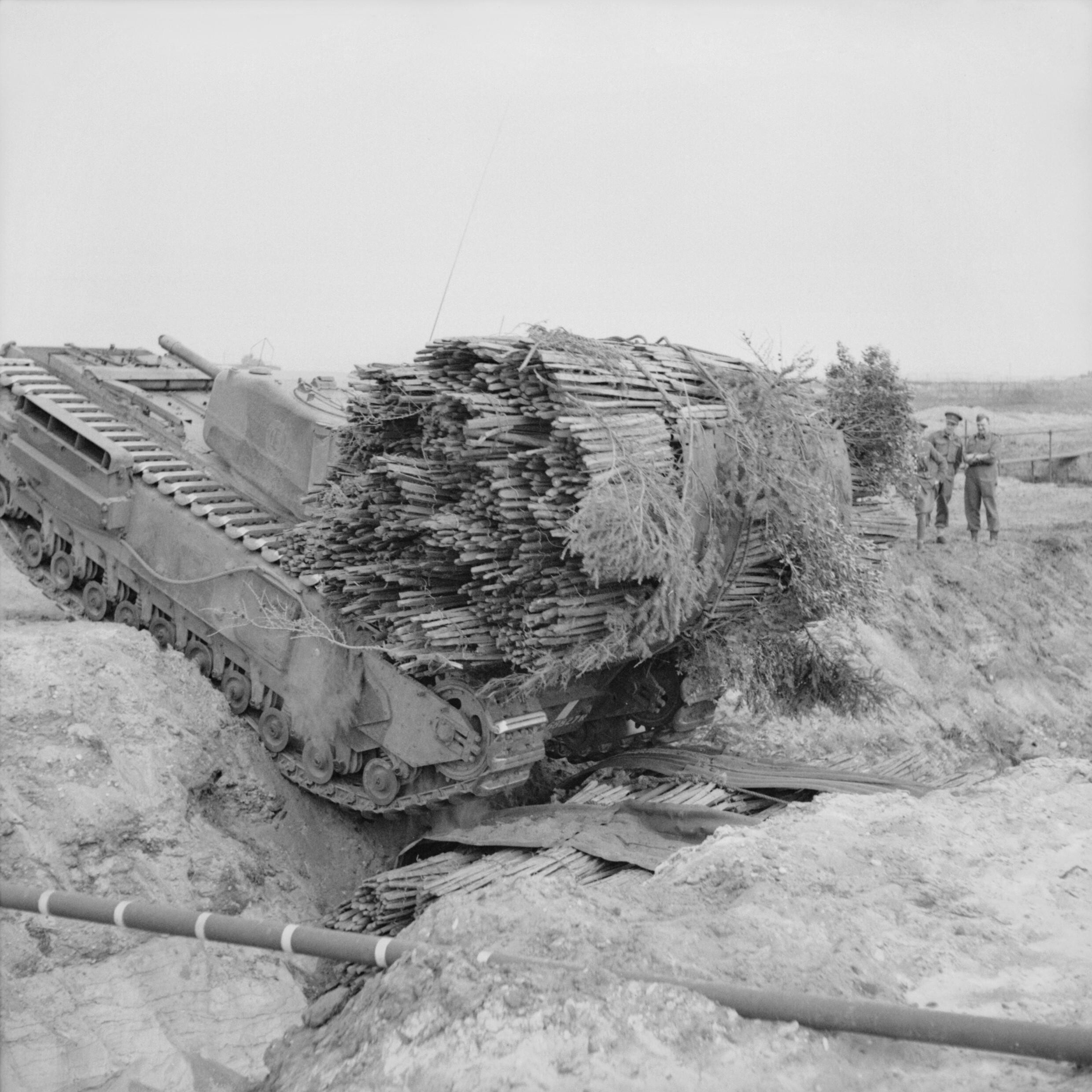
A Churchill AVRE, carrying a fascine, crosses a ditch using an already deployed fascine, (1943)

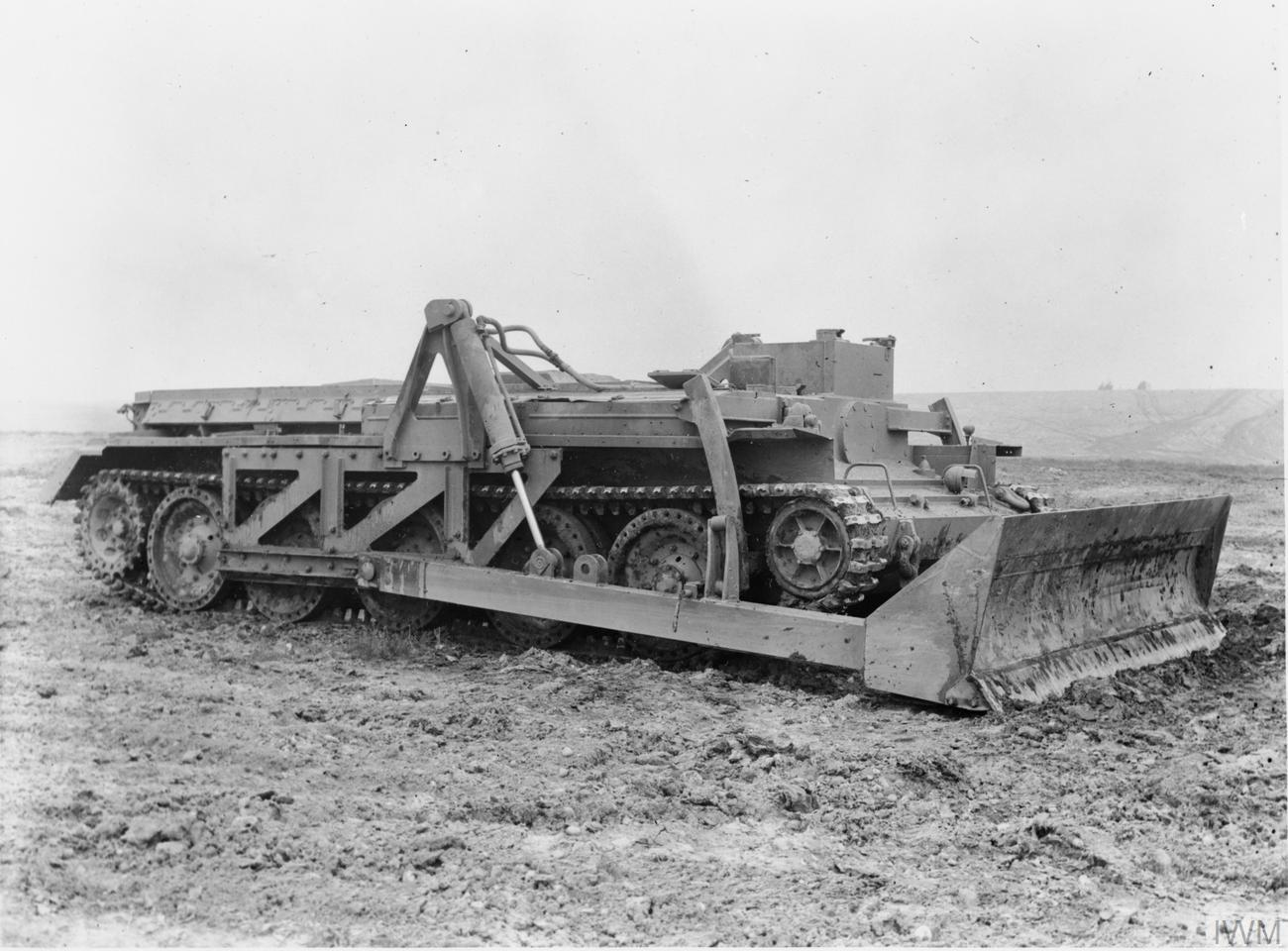
Centaur Bulldozer

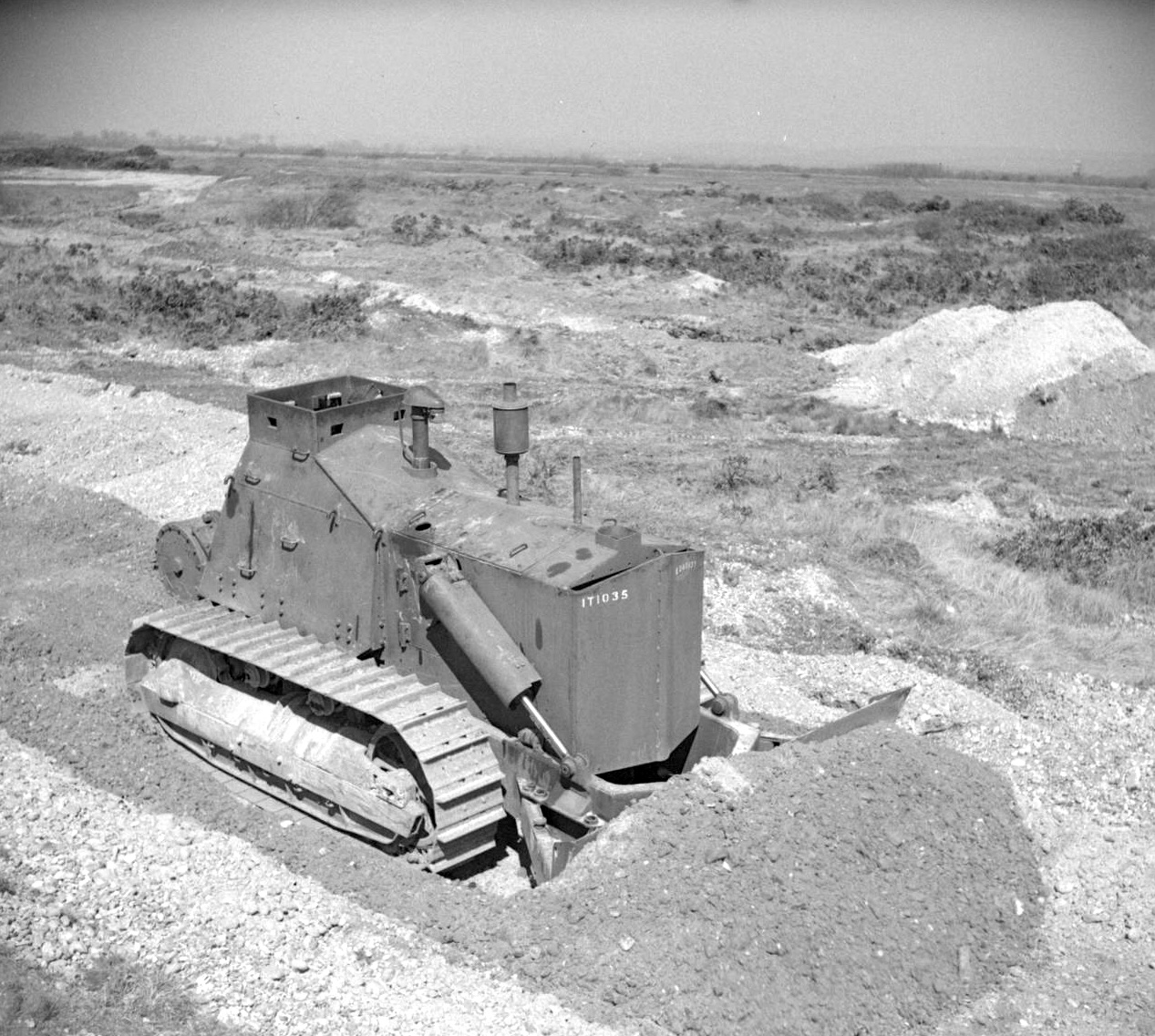
A D7 armoured bulldozer

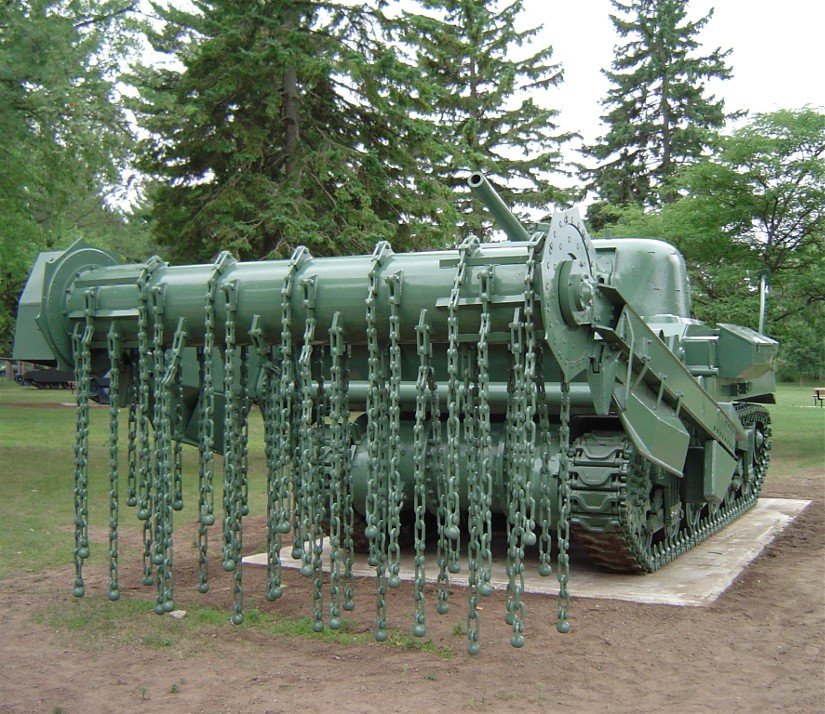
Sherman Crab – an M4 Sherman tank fitted with a Mine flail

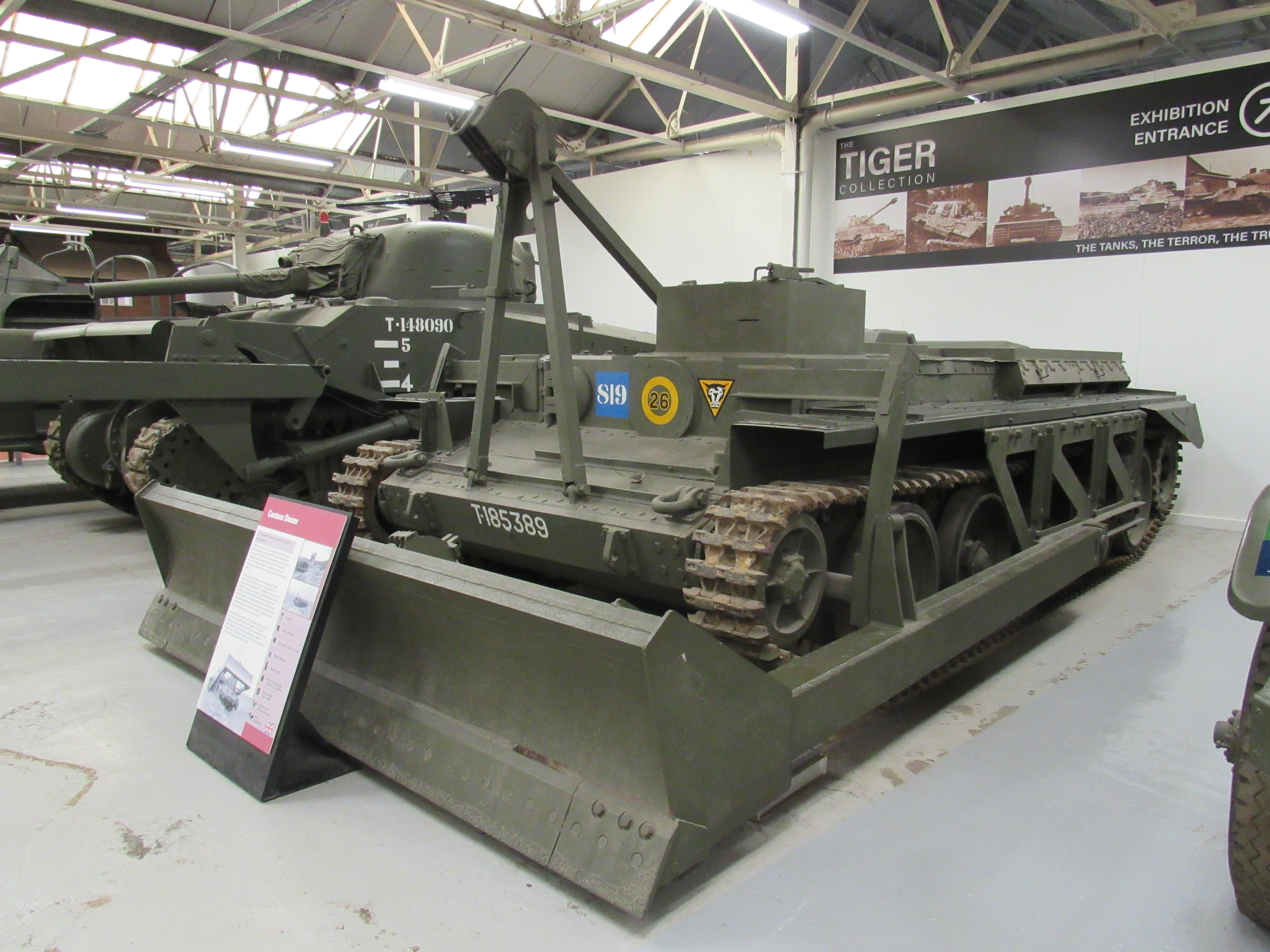
Centaur Bulldozer at The Tank Museum, Bovington

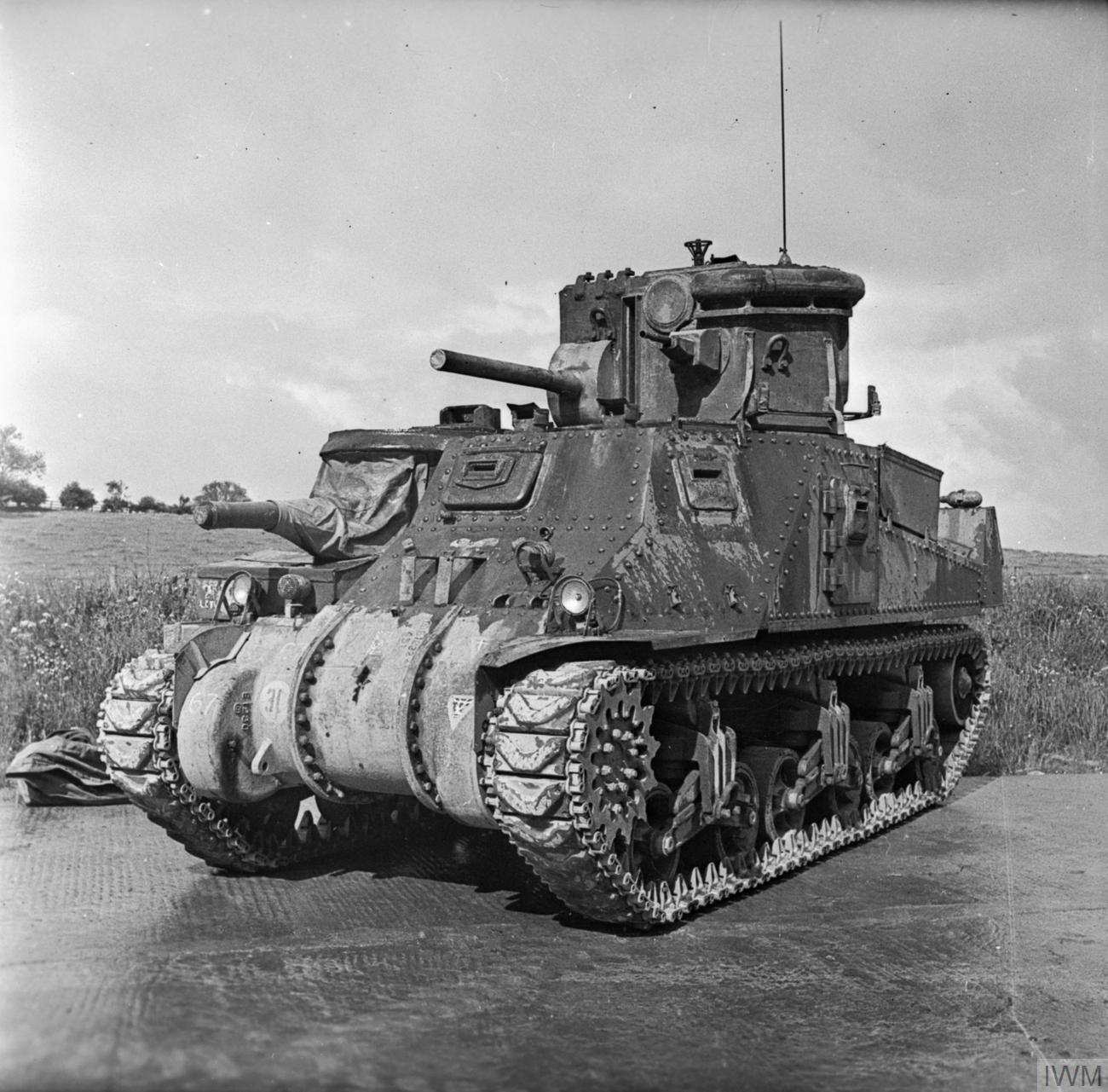
A Canal Defence Light turret fitted to an M3 Grant tank; the CDL turret is fitted with a dummy gun

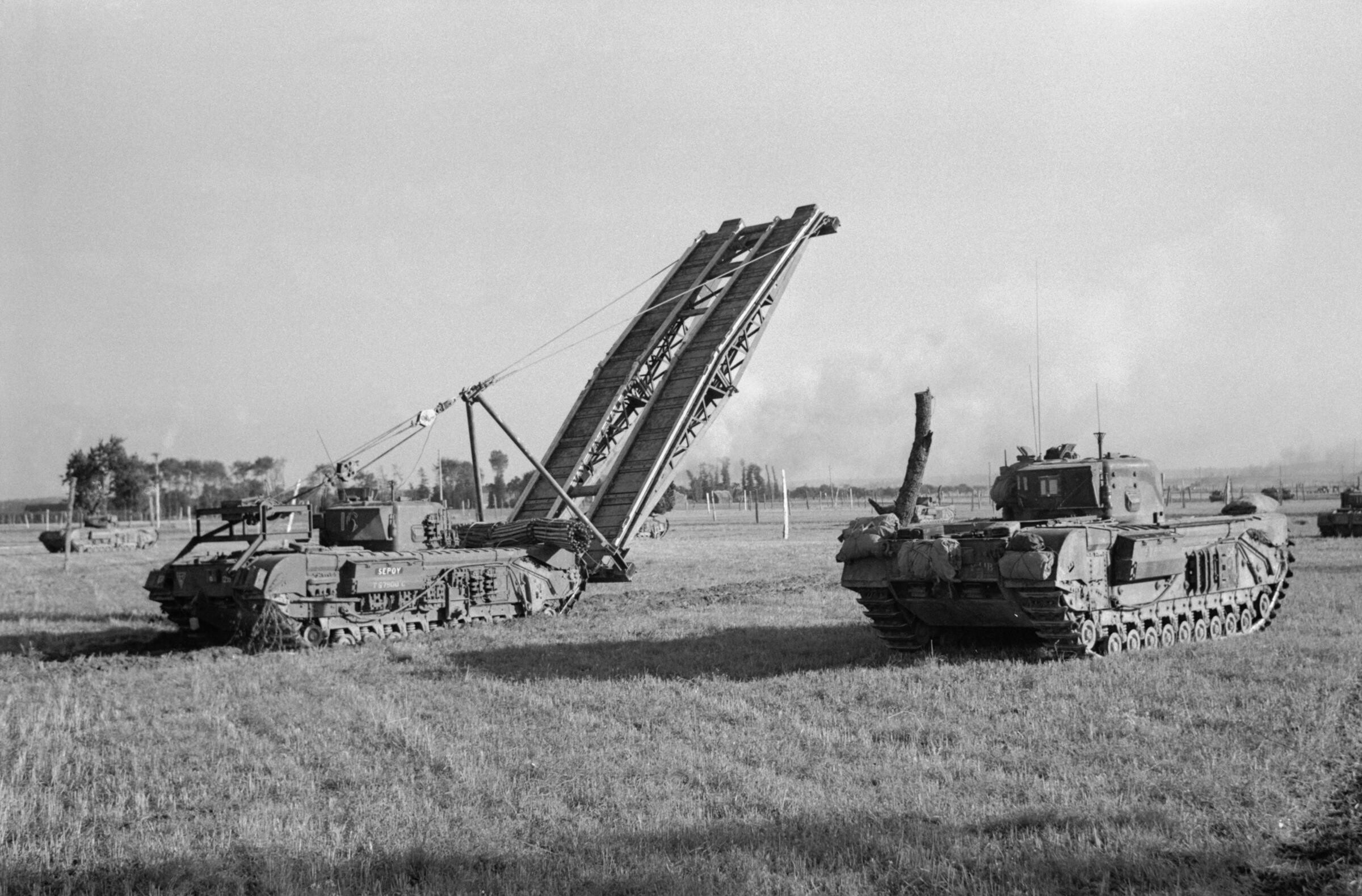
A Churchill AVRE with Small Box Girder Bridge and Churchill tanks on 13 September 1944

Ammunition-carrying Porpoise sledge

Many of the prototypes and their auxiliary equipment were developed by AEC.

== Post–Second World War use ==
The Centaur bulldozer continued to be used by the British Army for some years after the Second World War and saw action during the Korean War, as did the Churchill Crocodile. Also, small numbers of Churchill AVREs and Sherman BARVs were used until the 1960s, when they were replaced with similar vehicles based on the Centurion Tank. The Royal Engineers subsequently used modified Centurion and Chieftain tanks that are designed to fulfill the same roles in battle as the Funnies. The last examples of FV4003 Centurion Mk 5 AVRE 165 saw combat in the Gulf War/Operation Granby of 1991. The most recent vehicles in this line are the Titan and Trojan variants of the Challenger 2 tank.

Other nations developed their own armoured bulldozers after the war, such as the Soviet IMR variant of the T-72 tank, the US army's Rome plow, and the Israeli Armored CAT D9. Armoured bulldozers are still in use today for counter-insurgency by the Israel Defense Forces, the Egyptian army, and the Lebanese army.

== Surviving vehicles ==
This is an incomplete list:

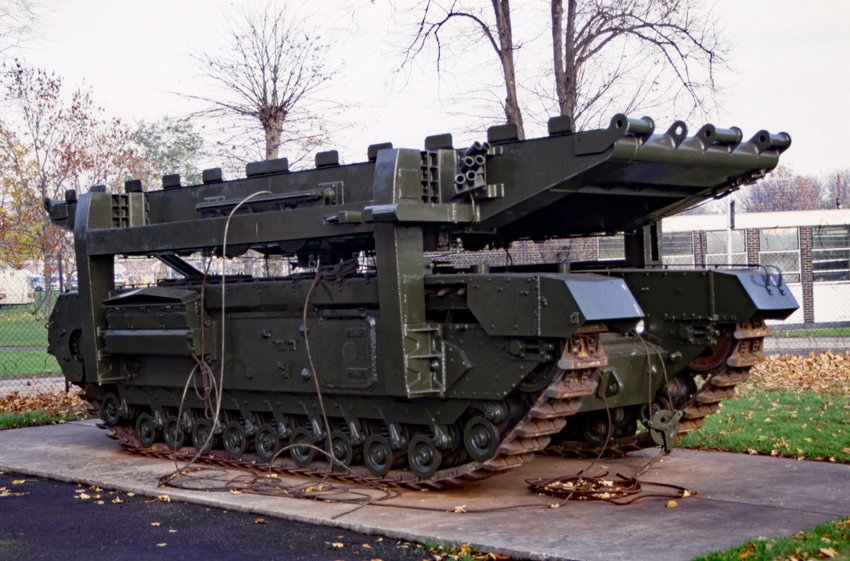
Churchill ARK self-propelled ramp layer at Chatham

- Churchill ARK: A Churchill ARK is in South Africa, owned by the School of Engineering, Kroonstad. There is another at the Royal Engineers museum in Chatham.

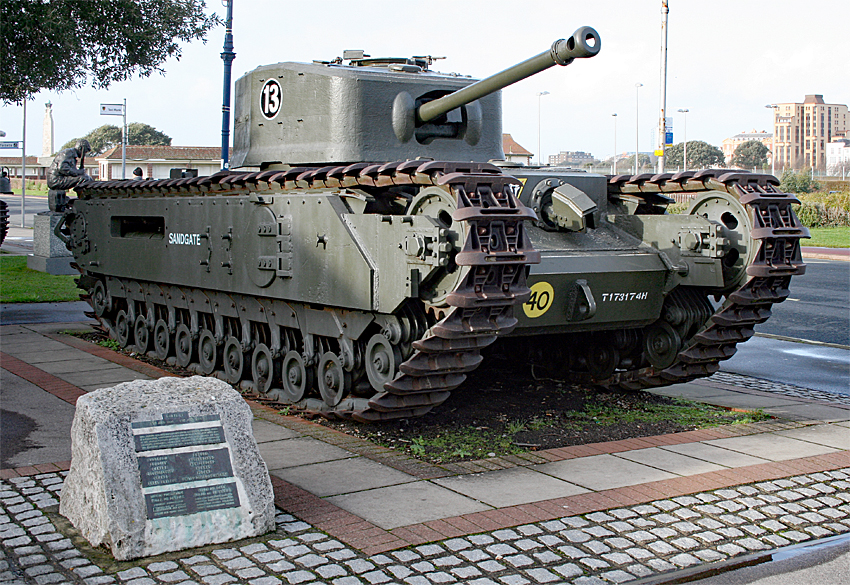
Churchill Crocodile at Southsea

- Churchill AVRE: The collection at The Tank Museum, Bovington includes a working Mark III Churchill AVRE. Another example is located in a hamlet of Graye-sur-Mer in Normandy; it is unusual in having been buried on D-Day in the shell-hole it fell into and then being recovered later as a memorial. MkIV AVREs are at the Imperial War Museum Duxford, the South African Armour Museum, and the National Museum of Military History, Johannesburg. A MkVII AVRE is a Gate guardian at the Allenby Barracks, at the Bovington army camp, headquarters of the Royal Wessex Yeomanry; another is at the Royal Engineers museum at Chatham, Medway. Several more AVREs still exist as wrecks on gunnery ranges.
- Churchill Crocodile: There is one example, without trailer, on display at the Bayeux Museum of the Battle of Normandy. A complete vehicle with trailer is held at Bovington. Mark VII Crocodiles are owned by the Muckleburgh Collection in Norfolk, the Cobbaton Combat Collection in Devon, the D-Day Story, the Wheatcroft Collection, the Kubinka Tank Museum in Russia, and the Museum of the Regiments, Calgary, Alberta. A Mark VIII is at the Royal Australian Armoured Corps Museum. Two (one in running order) are privately owned in the UK. One example at Fort Montbarey near Brest, France, where they were used in September 1944. Another example is displayed outside The D-Day Story museum in Southsea.
- Churchill Great eastern ramp: Only one Churchill great eastern ramp is known to survive today of the ten Mk.IV Churchill tanks converted. They saw virtually no combat use, as the need never arose. Only two were delivered to the 79th Armoured Division for trials in early 1945. The surviving unit was one of two sent to Canada for post-war testing and was recovered from a scrapyard in Kemptville, Ontario, in 1972. It is now held by the Canadian War Museum in Ottawa Ontario.
- Sherman DD: Five Sherman DDs are in museums; one is nearly intact, and four were sunken wrecks that were salvaged. See the main article for details.
- DD Valentine: One, restored to running condition, is in private ownership in Wolverhampton, England.
- Sherman Crab: Sherman Crabs are displayed at the CFB Borden Military Museum, Ontario, Canada; The Tank Museum, Bovington; the Yad La-Shiryon museum in Latrun; and the Overloon War Museum in the Netherlands. The Sherman serving as a war memorial on the sea dyke at Westkapelle, Netherlands, was a Crab but had its mine flail equipment removed after the war.
- Centaur Dozer: One is part of the collection at Bovington. Another is part of a private collection in the UK.
- Canal Defence Light: The Tank Museum, Bovington has a Matilda tank fitted with a Canal Defence Light turret. A CDL-equipped M3 Grant is displayed at Cavalry Tank Museum, Ahmednagar in India.
- Buffalo aka Amtrac LVT4: The Tank Museum, Bovington has an example.

== See also ==
- Allied technological cooperation during World War II
- BARV a Beach Armoured Recovery Vehicle developed at the same time as Hobart's Funnies by the Royal Electrical and Mechanical Engineers.
- History of the tank
- MD1 (military R&D organisation)
- Rhino tank a tank fitted with prongs to breach obstacles (such as hedgerows)
- Tanks in World War I
- Tanks in World War II
