= RF-8 =

Light Aerosani used in the second world war

RF-8 aerosani
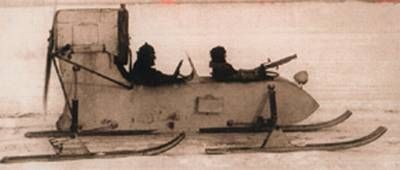
- Place of origin: Soviet Union

Production history
- Designer: GAZ

Specifications
- Mass: 0.892 t (1,970 lb)
- Length: 5.110 m
- Width: 2.525 m
- Height: 2.710 m
- Crew: 2
- Armor: none
- Main armament: 7.62mm DT machine gun
- Secondary armament: hand grenades
- Engine: 3.3L GAZ M-1 I4 (RF-8/GAZ-98); 8.6L (525 ci) Shvetsov M-11 air-cooled five-cylinder radial (GAZ-98K); 50 hp (37 kW) (RF-8/GAZ-98); 110 hp (82 kW) (GAZ-98K)
- Power/weight: 56 hp/tonne (RF-8/GAZ-98); 123 hp/tonne (GAZ-98K)
- Suspension: skis
- Maximum speed: 50 km/h (31 mph)

The RF-8, or GAZ-98, was an aerosan used by the Soviet Union during the Second World War and developed by Gorki Narkorechflota. The GAZ-98K was a version with a more powerful GAZ Shvetsov M-11 five-cylinder air-cooled 110-hp radial aviation engine in place of the standard automotive engine.

The Aerosan, which is Russian for "aero-sleigh" or propeller driven sleigh, was military vehicle that was used operationally in snowbound winter regions of Northern Europe by several nations during the first half of the 20th century; however it was Russia that made the most use of these specialised winter combat vehicles. The vehicles operated very successfully in these snowbound isolated areas with their poor road infrastructures, where tracked and wheeled vehicles were restricted by heavy snowfalls. These aerosans were organised into both combat aerosled battalions (BASB) and transport aerosled battalions (TASB).

The RF-8 was one such vehicle. Its design name was River Fleet 8 and was built by The Gorkiy Automobile Factory under the name GAZ-98, it soon acquired the commonly used designation RF-8-GAZ-98. This diminutive vehicle entered service in January 1942 and it is thought approximately 2000 were built throughout the war period.

It was constructed of aviation plywood and if like other aerosans was screwed and glued to a wooden frame. The vehicle sat on four wooden skis mounted on sprung suspension, and was powered by the same engine used in the GAZ-MM 4×2 truck, driving a two bladed 2.35m diameter rear mounted metal propeller. Compared to other aerosans of the time, the engine was comparatively low down giving it a low centre of gravity and therefore it was quite stable at speed, and the metal propeller fared better in wooded areas where it was less prone to damage from trees and light undergrowth. The crew compartment was typical of aviation design; a two-man crew sat in tandem; the driver at the rear and the commander/gunner at the front, who was armed with a ring mounted 7.62 mm DT machine gun, allowing 300° of traverse.

The RF-8-GAZ-98 was fast, stable effective; and was perfect for reconnaissance, communication, patrolling and raiding roles especially in support of ski troops; often operating behind enemy lines. In the winter of 1942/43 a large number were fitted with aircraft radial engines and designated (RF-8) GAZ-98K. The RF-8 operated into the 1950s with the Soviet border guards.
