= Aerosledge =

Propeller-driven sled, sleigh or toboggan

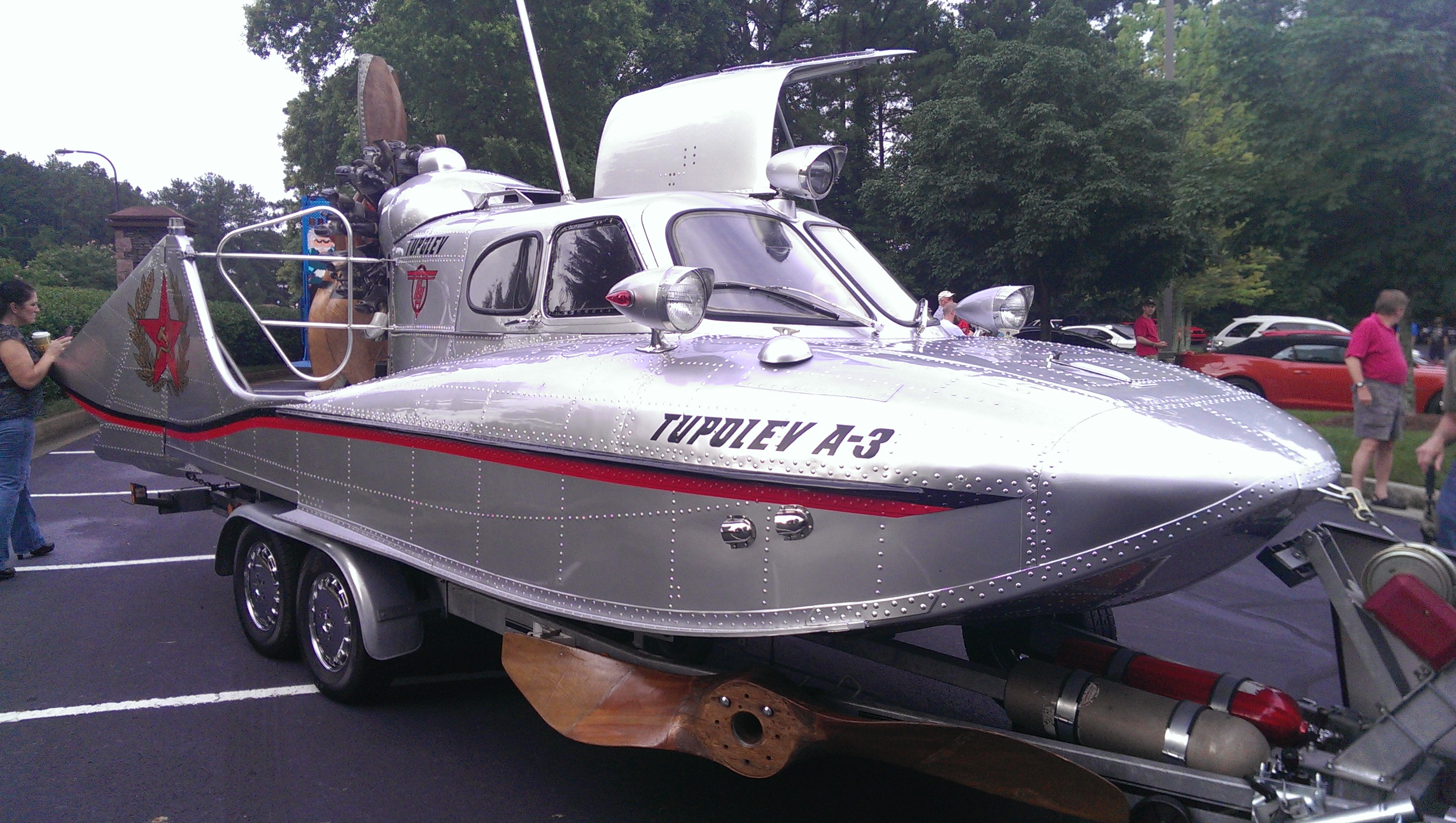
Tupolev A-3 Aerosledge

An Aerosledge (Russian: aэросани, "aerosani") is a propeller-driven sledge, sleigh or toboggan which slides on runners or skis. Aerosledges are used for communications, mail deliveries, medical aid, emergency recovery, and patrolling borders in countries such as northern Russia, as well as for recreation. Aerosani were used by the Soviet Red Army during the Winter War and World War II.

The first aerosledges may have been built in 1903–1905 by Sergei Nezhdanovsky. In 1909–10, young Igor Sikorsky designed and tested an aerosledge, before going on to build multi-engine airplanes and helicopters. They were light plywood vehicles on skis, powered by used vintage aircraft engines and propellers.

== Military usage ==
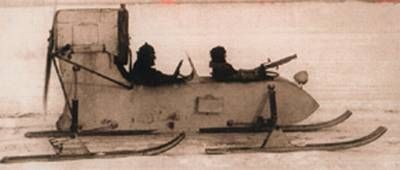
The RF-8, a smaller World War II model, powered by an inexpensive automotive engine

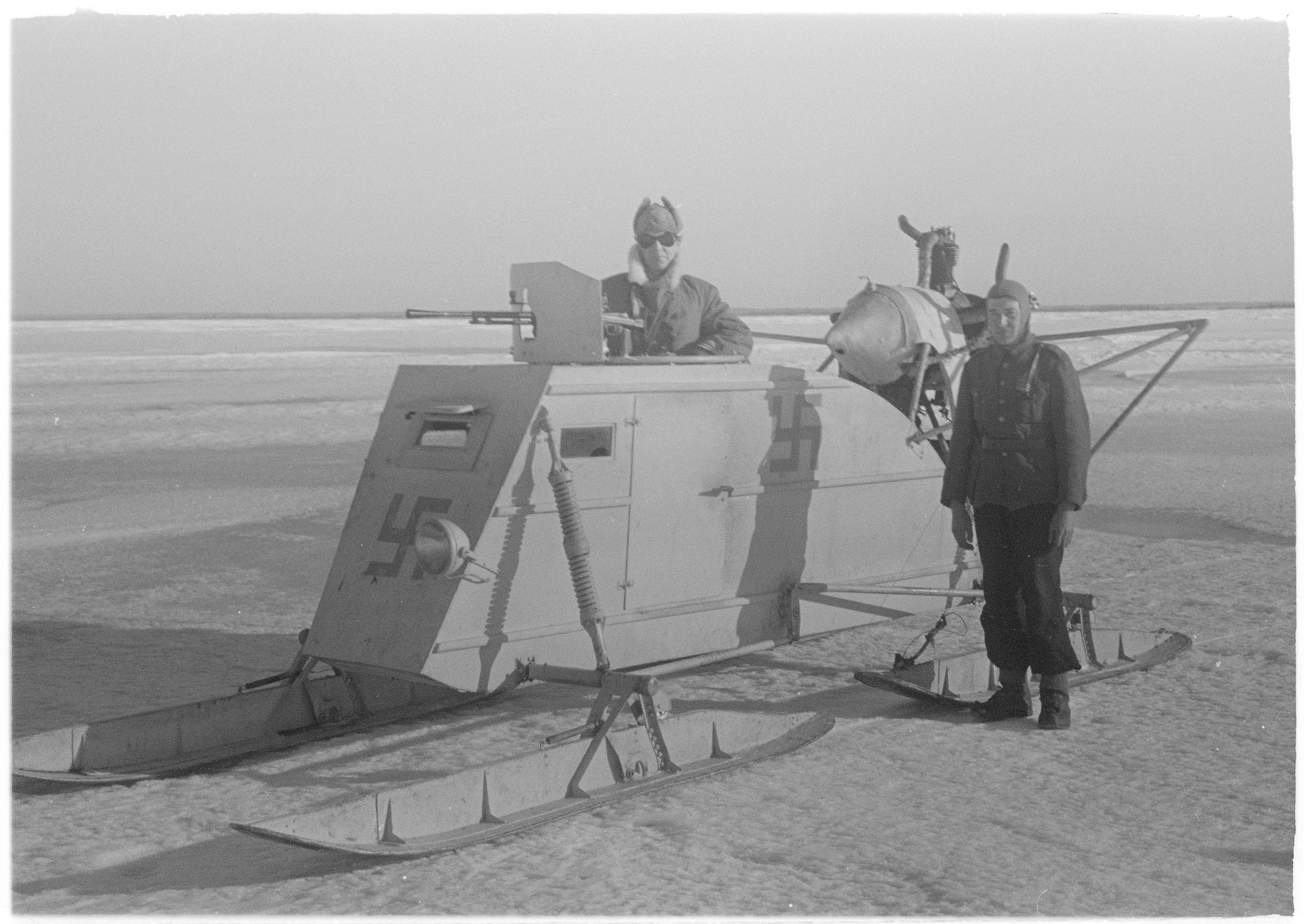
A NKL-26 aerosan captured from the Soviets and put to use by the Finnish military

Military use of the aerosani goes back to at least the 1910s. During World War I, aerosani were used for reconnaissance, communicating, and light raiding in northern areas. During the 1939–40 Winter War against Finland some were equipped with a machine gun ring mount on the roof. They could carry four or five men and tow four more on skis. The aerosani were initially used for transport, liaison, and medical evacuation in deep snow, mostly in open country and on frozen lakes and rivers because of their poor hill-climbing ability and limited maneuverability on winding forest roads.

During World War II aerosani were used for reconnaissance, communication, and light raiding in northern areas thanks to their high mobility (25–35 km/h) in deep snow, where many vehicles could not move at all. Responsibility for aerosani was transferred to the Soviet Armoured Forces (GABTU) and orders were submitted for design and fabrication of lightly armoured versions, protected by ten millimetres of steel plate on the front. They were organized into transport or combat battalions of 45 vehicles, in three companies, often employed in cooperation with ski infantry. Troops were usually carried or towed by transport aerosani, while fire support was provided by the heavier machine gun-armed, armoured models. Aerosani were not used for direct assault because of their vulnerability to explosives such as mortar rounds.

The ANT-I through ANT-V were a successful series of aerosani of the 1920s and 1930s, designed by aircraft engineer Andrei Tupolev. A claim exists that in 1924 the Soviets obtained plans and specifications for 'air sleighs' from Chester B. Wing, an aviator, automobile dealer and former mayor of St. Ignace, Michigan, U.S. He had built practical aerosleds to aid transportation across the ice between St. Ignace and Mackinac Island, and for use by fishermen. The Spring 1943 issue of the magazine Science and Mechanics states that "from his aerosleds the Russians developed their present battle sled." The claim though has to be viewed in the context of a pre-World War I picture of an Igor Sikorsky machine in Kiev.

The first military aerosani used in Finland, the KM-5 and OSGA-6 (later called NKL-6), were initially built at the Narkomles Factory in Moscow. During World War II, improved NKL-16/41 and NKL-16/42 models were built, and production started at the ZiS and GAZ car factories, and at smaller industries such as the Stalingrad Bekietovskiy Wood Works. In 1941 the armoured NKL-26, designed by M. Andreyev, started production at Narkomles. The following year, Gorki Narkorechflota developed the smaller, unarmoured GAZ-98, or RF-8, powered by a GAZ-M1 truck engine and a durable metal propeller. There was also an ASD-400 heavy assault sled used in World War II.

== See also ==
- Airboat
- Hydrocopter
- Ekranoplan
- Armoured fighting vehicle
- KRISTI snowcat
- Battle sled
- Multi-passenger snowmobiles

== Bibliography ==
- Zaloga, Steven J., James Grandsen (1984). Soviet Tanks and Combat Vehicles of World War Two, pp. 185–87, London: Arms and Armour Press. ISBN 0-85368-606-8.
- Science and Mechanics, Spring 1943, p. 49.
