= John W. O'Daniel =

United States Army general (1894–1975)

John Wilson O'Daniel
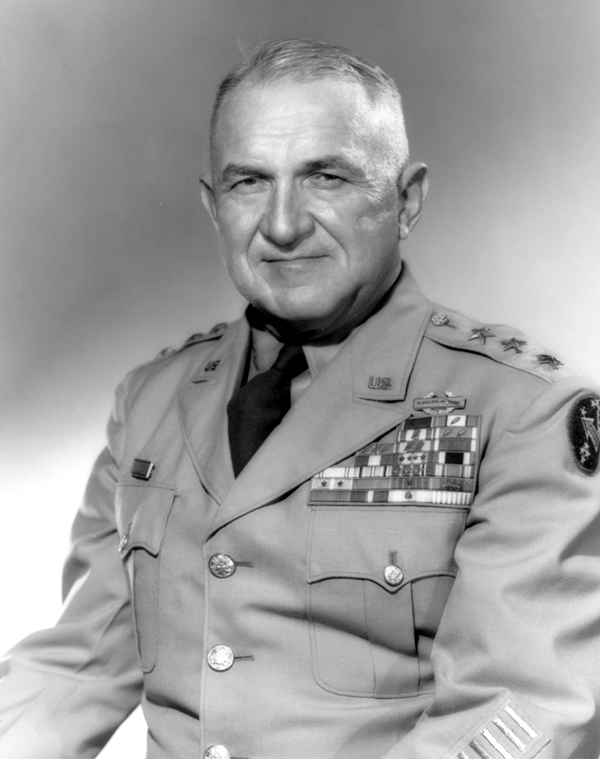
- Born: February 15, 1894; Newark, Delaware, U.S.
- Died: March 27, 1975 (aged 81); San Diego, California, U.S.
- Military career
- Allegiance: United States
- Branch: United States Army
- Service years: 1913–1955
- Rank: Lieutenant General
- Nickname: "Iron Mike"
- Service number: 0-7342
- Unit: Infantry Branch
- Commands: 2nd Battalion, 24th Infantry Regiment; 168th Infantry Regiment; 3rd Infantry Division; United States Army Infantry School; I Corps; United States Army Pacific; Military Assistance Advisory Group
- Conflicts: World War I World War II; Korean War
- Awards: Distinguished Service Cross; Army Distinguished Service Medal (4); Silver Star; Legion of Merit; Bronze Star; Purple Heart; Air Medal; Commendation Ribbon

Lieutenant General John Wilson O'Daniel (February 15, 1894 – March 27, 1975), nicknamed "Iron Mike", was a senior United States Army officer who served in World War I, World War II, and the Korean War. He is perhaps best known for serving with the 3rd Infantry Division in North Africa, Sicily, Italy, and Southern France during World War II. He was the commanding general (CG) of Audie Murphy, the most decorated soldier in the U.S. Army during World War II.

O'Daniel was an athlete, a teacher, a diplomat, and a lifetime military professional. He was short of stature (five foot six inches), an outspoken, doughty, gravel-voiced, combat leader of men through three major wars (World War I, World War II and the Korean War) spanning a forty-year military career. His motto was, "sharpen your bayonet". In his memoirs, General Dwight D. Eisenhower called him "one of our outstanding combat soldiers". The press likened him to General George S. Patton Jr. for his strong personal opinions and his fearless demeanor, as well as his dash and daring in moving the 3rd Infantry Division across the European Theater of Operations (ETO).

== Early life ==
John Wilson O'Daniel was born in Newark, Delaware on February 15, 1894. He graduated from high school at Oxford, Pennsylvania in 1912 and attended Delaware College in Newark, Delaware (now known as the University of Delaware), where he played varsity football and received the nickname "Mike". He enlisted in the Delaware National Guard in 1913 with Company E, 1st Delaware Infantry. On July 19, 1916, he was mobilized, and served as a corporal and sergeant with the First Infantry at the Mexico border in Deming, New Mexico. He was honorably discharged from service on his 23rd birthday, February 15, 1917.

== Early military career and World War I ==
After graduation from Delaware College in 1917, the same year the United States entered World War I, he was commissioned as a second lieutenant into the Infantry Branch of the United States Army Reserve on August 15 at Reserve Officers Training Camp at Fort Myer, Virginia. He received his regular commission on October 26 and was assigned to the 11th Infantry Regiment, part of the 5th Division, at Camp Forrest, Tennessee. O'Daniel was assigned to command a platoon in K Company of the regiment. His company commander, First Lieutenant Mark W. Clark, would go on to become a great friend and would be destined to play a large part in the newly commissioned O'Daniel's future military career.

In May 1918 he was, together with the rest of his battalion and division, shipped out to the Western Front to reinforce the American Expeditionary Forces (AEF), commanded by General John J. Pershing, for the remainder of the war and many months afterward. He took over command of the K Company when Clark, now a captain, was promoted to command the battalion, only to be wounded soon after. O'Daniel participated in the Battle of Saint-Mihiel, where he was badly wounded on September 12, 1918, the first day of the battle. Testifying to his endurance and aggressiveness in battle was his nickname, "Iron Mike", awarded by his peers, said to be a result of his actions at Saint-Mihiel, where he fought for twelve hours, even though he was hit in the face by a German machine gun bullet and severely wounded. It was for this action that he was later awarded the Distinguished Service Cross (DSC), the nation's second highest award for valor, for his actions, as well as the Purple Heart. The citation for his DSC reads:

The President of the United States of America, authorized by Act of Congress July 9, 1918, takes pleasure in presenting the Distinguished Service Cross to Second Lieutenant (Infantry) John Wilson O'Daniel (ASN: 0-7342), United States Army, for extraordinary heroism in action while serving with 11th Infantry Regiment, 5th Division, A.E.F., near Bois-St. Claude, in the St. Mihiel salient, 12 September 1918. After being severely wounded in the head early in the action Lieutenant O'Daniel continued in command of his platoon, leading his men for several hours until forced to give in to complete physical exhaustion, thus displaying most exceptional courage, determination, and devotion to duty.

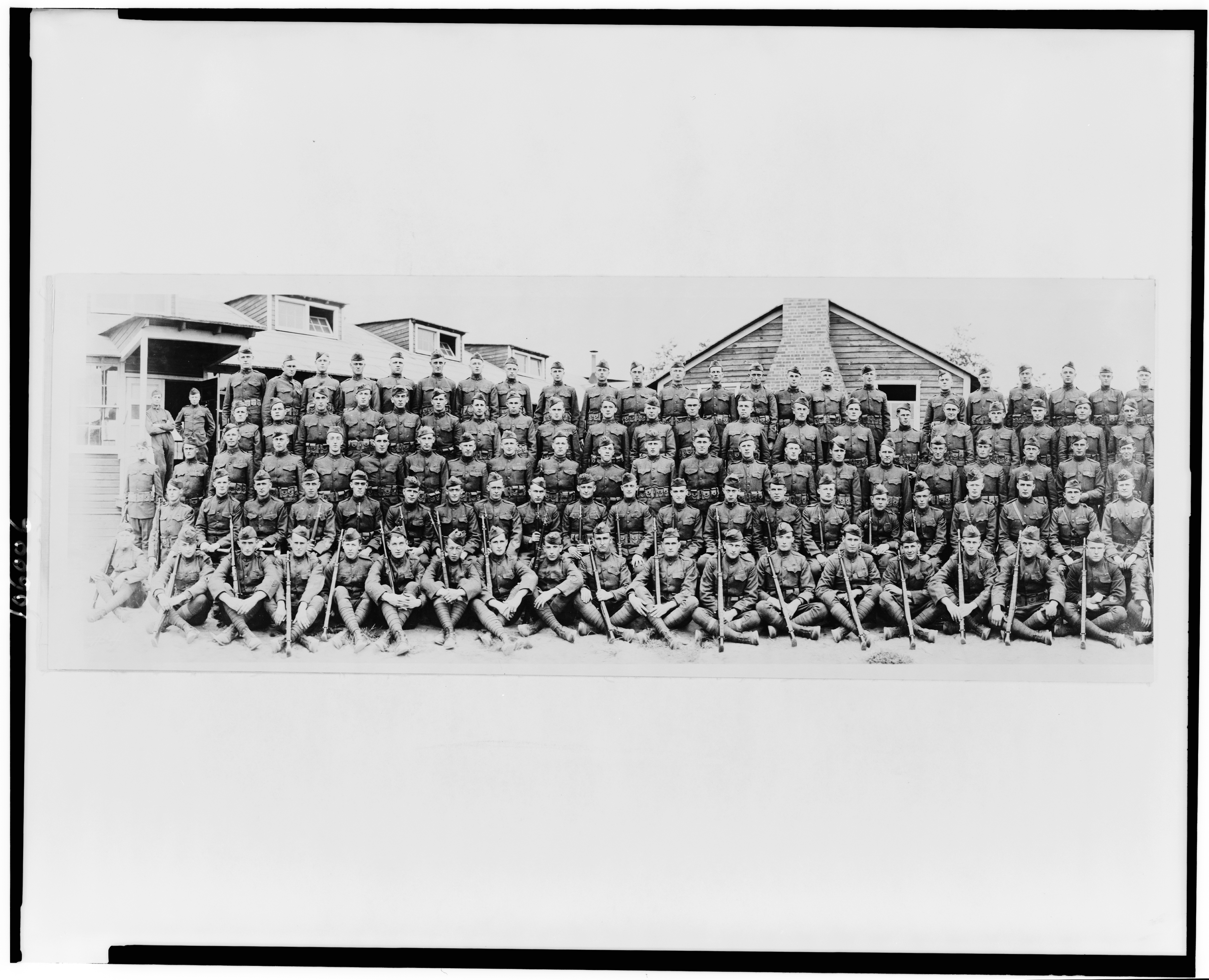
File:Co. "H", 3rd Army composite reg., (Pershing's own), Capt. J. W. O'Daniels, Commanding.

He recovered shortly afterward and went on to participate in what was, and still is, the largest battle in the history of the U.S. Armed Forces, the Meuse–Argonne offensive.

After the war ended, on November 11, 1918 at 11:00am, he returned with the regiment to the United States in September 1919 and was later transferred to the 25th Infantry Regiment at Camp Stephen D. Little at Nogales, Arizona.

== Between the wars ==
O'Daniel became an infantry instructor with New Jersey National Guard at Trenton in May 1924. In September 1927 he entered the Infantry School at Fort Benning Georgia and graduated in May 1928. He was transferred in July 1928 to the 21st Infantry at Schofield Barracks, Hawaii and in January 1930 was placed in command of the Military Police Detachment of the Hawaiian Department at Fort Schafter. In October 1931 he joined the 12th Infantry at Fort Howard, Maryland.

In the 1930s with the country locked in the Great Depression, O'Daniel undertook a series of assignments that departed from traditional military roles. In May 1933, O'Daniel became assistant to the Officer in Charge of the New York Port of Embarkation for the Pilgrimage of War Mothers and Widows. From September to November 1933, he was on Civilian Conservation Corps duty at Smokemont, North Carolina and then was assigned to the 22nd Infantry Regiment at Fort Oglethorpe, Georgia. In July 1934 he was appointed Army liaison officer with the Tennessee Valley Authority. In March 1935 he became adjutant of District "D" of the Civilian Conservation Corps at Fort McClellan, Alabama. He was named Executive Officer of District "D" in July 1935, earning advancement to major in August, and a year later he became Professor of Military Science and Tactics at the Academy of Richmond County at Augusta, Georgia.

O'Daniel entered the Command and General Staff School at Fort Leavenworth, Kansas, in September and graduated in June 1939. He was then assigned to Fort Brady, Michigan as an instructor of the Citizen's Military Training Camp and Officer's Reserve Corps. In August 1939 he became branch instructor in the Michigan Military Area with headquarters in Detroit. On August 18, 1940, O'Daniel was promoted to the rank of lieutenant colonel.

== World War II ==
In January 1941, during World War II (although the United States was still neutral), he became commander of the 2nd Battalion, 24th Infantry Regiment at Fort Benning with which he participated in the Third Army maneuvers in Louisiana–a critical test of logistical and combat capabilities for the later fighting in World War II. O'Daniel's regimental commander, Colonel Charles Lockett, "wrote that Iron Mike was the best battalion commander he had ever seen".

Shortly after the American entry into the war, on December 24, 1941, he was promoted to colonel and became Assistant Chief of Staff for operations of the Third Army and Director of the Junior Officers Training Center in San Antonio, Texas. In June 1942 he was named Operations Officer of the Amphibious Training Center at Camp Edwards, Massachusetts.

=== North Africa, Sicily and Italy ===
In July 1942 O'Daniel was transferred to Allied Forces Headquarters (AFHQ) in Europe as Commander of the American Invasion Training School in the United Kingdom. In September he assumed command of the 168th Infantry Regiment, part of the 34th Infantry Division, a National Guard formation under Major General Charles W. Ryder, leading it in the Allied invasion of French North Africa (Operation Torch), and led the regiment on November 8–9, 1942 in the capture of Algiers and the subsequent run for Tunis. He was also rewarded with a promotion to the one-star general officer rank of brigadier general, on November 20. In December, he was assigned by Lieutenant General Mark W. Clark (who had served with O'Daniel in the 11th Infantry in World War I) to organize the U.S. Fifth Army Invasion Training Center in North Africa which trained the forces for future amphibious landings.

In July 1943 O'Daniel landed in Sicily (which was given the codename of Operation Husky) with the 3rd Infantry Division, under Major General Lucian Truscott. On July 24, 1943, two weeks after the initial landings on Sicily, he returned to Algiers and was attached to the inexperienced 36th "Texas" Infantry Division, another National Guard formation, recruiting from Texas, under the command of Major General Fred L. Walker, for the Salerno landings (Operation Avalanche) in September. Although not required to do so, he chose to land with the troops at Salerno, landing with the 36th's 142nd Infantry Regiment, and, in the words of his biographer, Timothy R. Stoy, "played a significant role in defending the beachhead, as well as the conduct of beach operations for the 36th Infantry Division". His performance during the fighting continued to impress his more senior commanders, in particular with Walker, who had served with "Mike" in the 1920s, and who later personally awarded O'Daniel with the Silver Star.

Again, his stay was short as he became officer in charge of amphibious operations for the Fifth Army on October 10, and the following month he succeeded Brigadier General William W. Eagles as the assistant division commander (ADC) of the 3rd Infantry Division, still commanded by Major General Truscott, which had landed in Italy the month before. The division crossed the Volturno Line and advanced up the spine of Italy until being held up by the formidable German Winter Line (also known as the Gustav Line) defenses. The division, after spearheading the Fifth Army's advance and having seen much hard fighting and sustaining heavy casualties, was withdrawn for rest in November.

He took part in the landings at Anzio (Operation Shingle) in January 1944. Operation Shingle was an amphibious assault around the Italian town of Anzio in an attempt to outflank the Gustav Line and capture the Italian capital of Rome. In February O'Daniel assumed command of the 3rd Infantry Division from Major General Truscott, who was promoted to the command of VI Corps from Major General John P. Lucas, while still on the Anzio beachhead. While under his command the division repelled several furious German counterattacks, finally breaking out of the beachhead encirclement in May during Operation Diadem and driving to Rome, where he was promoted to the two-star rank of major general. He was also awarded the Army Distinguished Service Medal for his service in Italy and, on May 30, 1944, he was promoted to major general.

Much publicized, if not completely reported, was the comment he made at a staff meeting in response to a question from British General Sir Harold R. L. G. Alexander, Commander-in-Chief (C-in-C) of the Allied Armies in Italy (later redesignated the 15th Army Group). "I believe your division did not give an inch", asked General Alexander. "Is that true?" The reply from O'Daniel was "Not a God-damned inch."

=== Western Europe ===
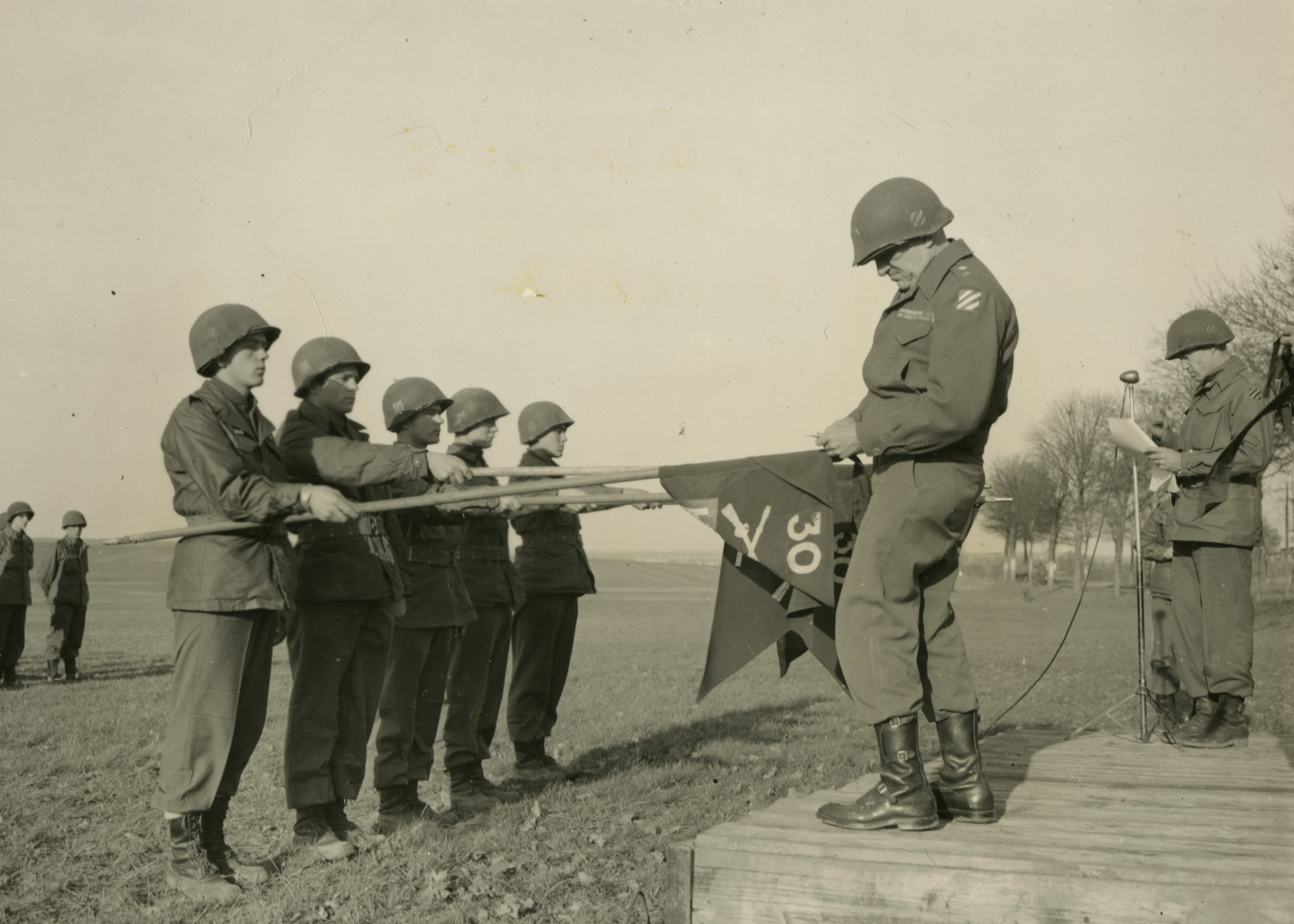
G.I.'s of the 3rd Battalion, 30th Infantry Regiment, 3rd Division, receiving the Presidential Unit Citation from their division commander, Major General O'Daniel, in France, November 1944.

He served there until August 1944 when O'Daniel and his 3rd Division landed at the St. Tropez Peninsula in Southern France and drove north through the Vosges Mountains to Germany. O'Daniel led the 3rd Division up the Rhône Valley to Strasbourg, in the Colmar Pocket where it decimated German forces in January 1945 and when it smashed across the Siegfried Line at Zweibrücken in March 1945. He frequently flew over the front lines in a light airplane dropping notes to the troops below, exhorting them to advance. He led the division across the River Rhine and participated in the capture of the Nazi citadel at Nuremberg on April 20, 1945, after ruthless house to house fighting. O'Daniel hoisted his flag over Adolf Hitler Square in the center of the city and paid a rousing tribute to the exhausted infantrymen around him for having "driven the hun" from one of the last remaining Nazi strongholds.

Just before noon on April 20, 1945–Adolf Hitler's birthday–the 2nd Battalion of the 30th Infantry Regiment reached the Adolf Hitler Platz in the center of the town after taking its ground in a building-to-building fight. The street markers in the square were replaced by others bearing the name "Eiserner Michael Platz" (Iron Mike Square) in honor of the 3rd Division's CG, Major General John W. O'Daniel, who was known to his intimate friends and to thousands of Marnemen as "Iron Mike."

At 1830, in the battered Adolf Hitler Platz, a rifle platoon from each regiment, as well as tanks, TDs, and Flak wagons, stood in silent array. Old Glory ascended an improvised flagpole and the band played the National Anthem. Major General John W. O'Daniel then spoke.

"Again the 3d Division has taken its objective," he said. "We are standing at the site of the stronghold of Nazi resistance in our zone. Through your feats of arms, you have smashed fifty heavy antiaircraft guns, captured four thousand prisoners, and driven the Hun from every house and every castle and bunker in our part of Nuremberg.

"I congratulate you upon your superior performance. . .

The band broke into "Dogface Soldier." A few bewildered civilians contemplated the red, white, and blue banner flying at half-staff in mourning for President Franklin D. Roosevelt.

The 3rd Infantry Division went on to conquer Augsburg, Munich, and Salzburg. It ended the war with the capture of Berchtesgaden, Hitler's mountain stronghold in May 1945. Representatives of German Generalfeldmarschall Albert Kesselring surrendered to him and he turned them over to General Jacob L. Devers, commander of the 6th Army Group, near Munich on May 5, 1945. One of O'Daniel's proudest trophies from the war was a pair of Hermann Göring's trousers. He called them "a lot of pants". At war's end it was reported that O'Daniel's "Rock of the Marne" 3rd Division had been awarded one fourth of all Medals of Honor presented during the war for its feats in North Africa, Sicily, Italy, France and Germany.

In July 1945, O'Daniel was assigned temporary duty with Army Ground Forces Headquarters in Washington, D.C. Later that month he became the commandant of the U.S. Army Infantry School at Fort Benning, Georgia, and in November 1946 was also appointed Commanding General there.

== Cold War and later military career ==
O'Daniel was soon in the midst of the Cold War. He was named Military Attaché at Moscow Russia in June 1948 and after temporary duty with the Intelligence Division at Army headquarters, assumed that position the following September, serving until August 1950 when he was appointed Infantry Inspector in the Office of the Chief of Army Field Forces at Fort Monroe, Virginia. He once recalled that it was the only time he ever wore all of his military decorations he had received, "to dazzle the Russians who were impressed with his medals." After returning from Moscow he made news when he wrote a lengthy magazine article about his experience and was quoted as saying, "For all its advertised glory, Moscow first impressed me, and still does, as a vast slum." The Soviet newspaper Pravda responded by accusing him of being a spy and a liar.

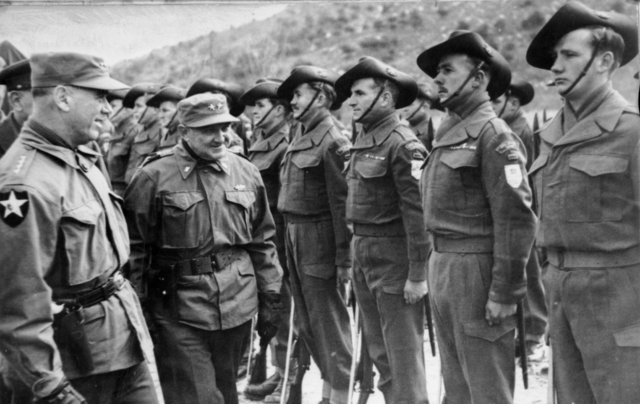
Lieutenant General James Van Fleet (left), commanding the U.S. Eighth Army, inspects members of the 3rd Battalion, Royal Australian Regiment after awarding a Presidential Unit Citation to the battalion in December 1952. To Van Fleet's left is Major General O'Daniel, commanding the U.S. I Corps.

In July 1951, he went to Korea to command I Corps (United States), U.S. 8th Army for his last combat assignment. During his service in Korea, he was awarded the Air Medal for meritorious achievement on flights from July 21 to August 14, 1951, and the Commendation Ribbon for meritorious achievement on July 18, 1951. O'Daniel gained an appreciation for the use of airpower saying "The airlift to Korea is one of the greatest developments of this war. It gives a commander advantages he never had in wars before." He pinned on his third star on December 20, 1951.

On September 1, 1952, O'Daniel became commanding general of U.S. Army Forces Pacific returning once again to Fort Schafter, Hawaii.

In April 1954, at the behest of President Eisenhower, he was posted as the Chief of the Military Assistance Advisory Group for Indo-China, leading the vanguard of America's involvement in Indochina. America was seeking to bolster wavering French resolve against Communist aggression. O'Daniel took a voluntary drop in rank so he would not outrank the French commander at that time. His appointment was somewhat controversial because some viewed him as not having the requisite tact and sophistication. Eisenhower defended him, believing that his critics underestimated him. "Despite his nickname and his tough exterior", Eisenhower wrote, "General O'Daniel was a man of great ability and tact". He had been chosen for the assignment largely on the basis of his successful role in creating and supervising the training programs which had transformed the South Korean Army into an effective fighting force during the Korean War. Eventually, he came to lead the 342-man group tasked with building South Vietnam's defense forces, as permitted by the Geneva Accord.

He was optimistic that with American help Communism in Southeast Asia could be held at bay. He recommended an increased American presence as France disengaged from the area. His advice was taken, and he proceeded with 350 additional men to train and equip a more competent and professional South Vietnamese military. "Iron Mike" became a forceful advocate of the U.S. commitment to South Vietnam, calling it "a test of our guts and our resilience." At the end of 1955, he passed his command to Lt. Gen. Samuel Tankersley Williams. A monument to O'Daniel was erected at Quang Trung National Training Center, about 10 miles (16 km) northwest of Saigon, the site of the largest training camp in the country at the time.

O'Daniel retired from active service on December 31, 1955. At his retirement ceremony General Maxwell Taylor, the U.S. Army Chief of Staff, paid a personal tribute during a Pentagon ceremony. Commenting that "'Iron Mike' always gets his objective", General Taylor told the story of how O'Daniel captured Berchtesgaden in May 1945. Racing down one side of the Autobahn and finally putting his forces across the single available bridge, O'Daniel's men won the spirited race to the prized objective from the soldiers of the 101st Airborne Division. General Taylor had been in command of the 101st at the time. O'Daniel was awarded a third oak leaf cluster to his Distinguished Service Medal at the ceremony.

== Decorations ==
His military decorations include the French Croix de Guerre, the British Order of the Bath, the Italian Medaglia d'Argento al Valore Militare, the Distinguished Service Cross, the Army Distinguished Service Medal with three Oak Leaf Clusters, the Silver Star with Oak Leaf Cluster, the Legion of Merit with three Oak Leaf Clusters, the Bronze Star with three Oak Leaf Clusters, and the Purple Heart.

He was given Delaware's highest civilian medal, the Governor's Medal as well as the Conspicuous Service Cross of Delaware. He was awarded an honorary PhD from the University of Delaware in 1956.

- Distinguished Service Cross
- Army Distinguished Service Medal with three Oak Leaf Clusters
- Silver Star with Oak Leaf Cluster
- Legion of Merit with three Oak Leaf Clusters
- Bronze Star with three Oak Leaf Clusters
- Purple Heart
- Croix de guerre 1939-1945
- Order of the Bath
- Silver Medal of Military Valor

== Later life ==
After returning from South Vietnam and retiring, he was chairman of a civilian group called American Friends of Vietnam, demonstrating his personal commitment to the Vietnamese people.

He attended a reunion in Newark at the University of Delaware also attended by retired Marine Corps Lieutenant General Robert T. Pepper, and General Julian C. Smith in 1967. O'Daniel sent his alma mater a portrait given to him by Ngo Dinh Diem, the first president of South Vietnam. The Middletown Transcript recorded his last visit to Delaware on Nov 28 1971: "Lt. Gen. John W. "Iron Mike" O'Daniel, World War II hero, returned to Newark to settle the estate of his aunt Miss Etta J. Wilson."

A 1945 oil portrait of O'Daniel by Stanley Arthurs hangs in Alumni Hall at the University of Delaware.

He died in San Diego on March 27, 1975, survived by his wife Gretchen, a daughter, Mrs. Ruth Snyder of Pacific Grove California, and four grandchildren. His first wife, Ruth died in 1965. His only son, John W. O'Daniel Jr., a paratrooper, was killed in action in World War II, near Arnhem in September 1944 during Operation Market Garden, while serving in the 505th Parachute Infantry Regiment, part of Major General James Gavin's 82nd Airborne Division. A brother, J. Allison O'Daniel, was killed in an air crash while serving in World War I.

== See also ==
- O'Daniel's Battle sled

== Bibliography ==
- Stoy, Lieutenant Colonel Timothy R. (2022). Sharpen Your Bayonets: A Biography of Lieutenant General John Wilson "Iron Mike" O'Daniel, Commander, 3rd Infantry Division in World War II. Casemate. ISBN 978-1-63624-240-8.

Military offices
Preceded by Lucian Truscott	Commanding General 3rd Infantry Division; 1944–1945	Succeeded by William R. Schmidt
Preceded by Fred L. Walker	Commandant of the United States Army Infantry School; 1945–1948	Succeeded by Withers A. Burress
Preceded by Frank W. Milburn	Commanding General I Corps; 1951–1952	Succeeded by Paul Wilkins Kendall
Preceded by Henry Aurand	Commanding General United States Army Pacific; 1952–1954	Succeeded by Clark L. Ruffner
