= NKL-26 =

Soviet armoured aerosledge

NKL-26 (Rz 2612)
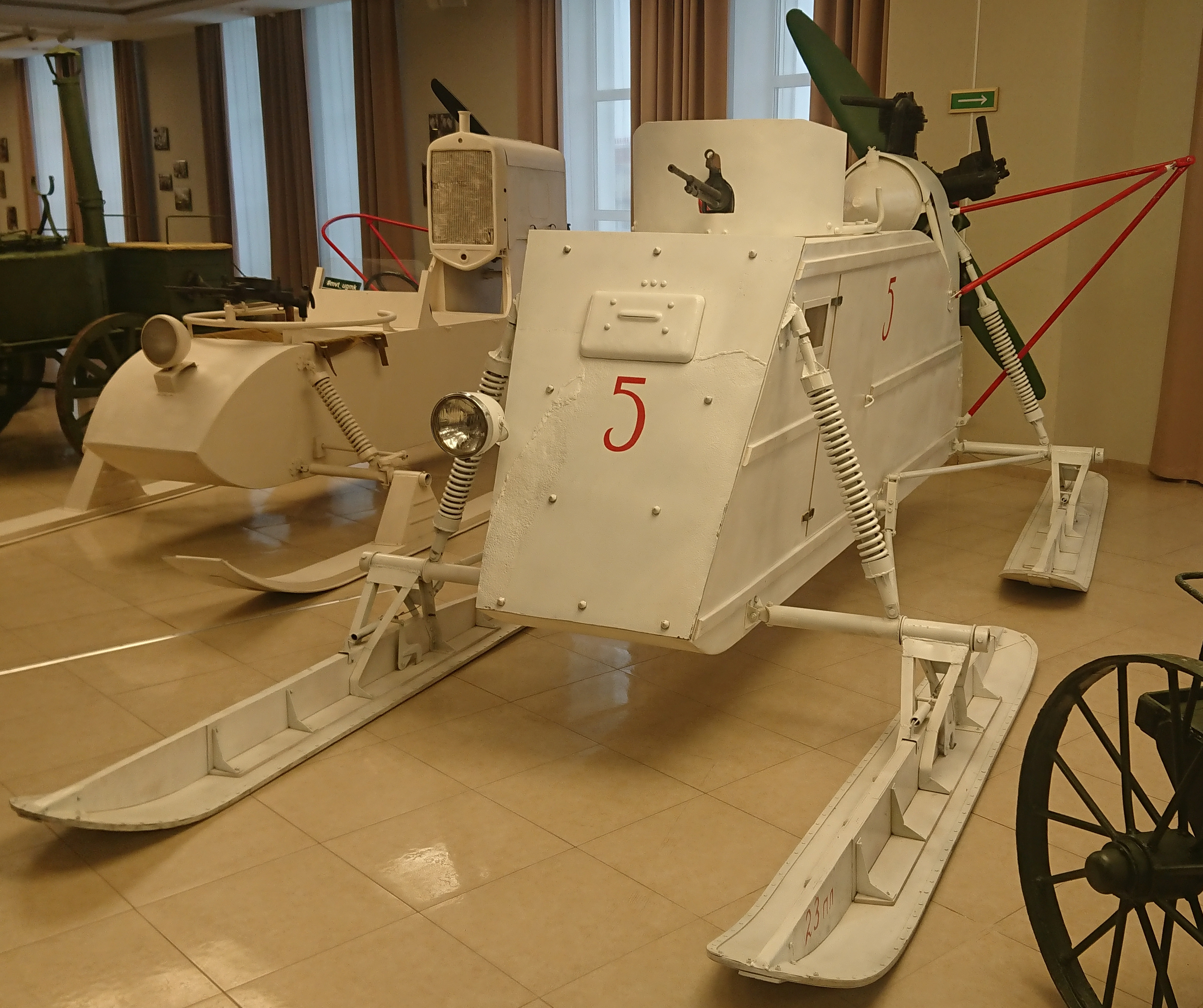
- Place of origin: Soviet Union

Specifications
- Crew: 2
- Armor: 10 mm (front only)
- Main armament: 7.62mm DT machine gun
- Engine: 8.6L (525 ci) Shvetsov M-11G
- Operational range: 250 km
- Maximum speed: 50 km/h (31 mph)

The NKL-26 was an armoured aerosan introduced by the Soviet Union during the Second World War, based on the earlier NKL-6 (OSGA-6). It was made of plywood and had a ten-millimetre armour plate on the front only, and was armed with a 7.62mm DT machine gun in a ring mount. It was powered by an M-11G aircraft engine.

Each NKL-26 was operated by two crewmen. NKL-26s were organized into battalions of 30 NKL-16s with a transport company of NKL-16s - each with three companies of 10. Each company was organized as three platoons of three vehicles, and a commanders vehicle.

Combat Aerosans often worked with ski infantry battalions, and could carry four ski troops riding outside the vehicle on its skis or towed behind.
