= SOMUA MCG =

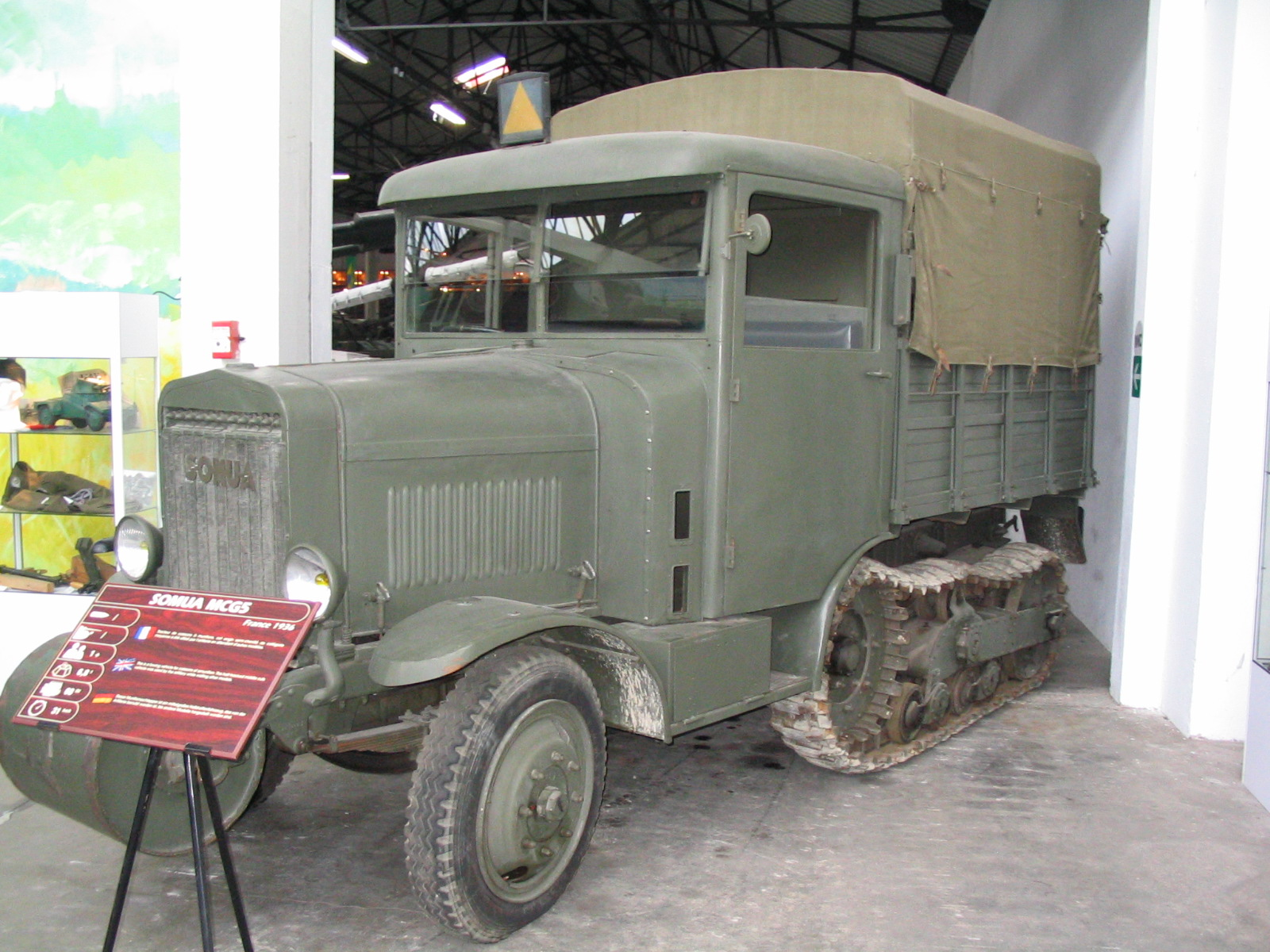
- MCG5 on display at Musée des Blindés
- Type: Artillery tractor, armored recovery vehicle
- Place of origin: France

Service history
- Used by: (Kingdom of Greece) Kingdom of Greece; Nazi Germany

Production history
- Manufacturer: Somua, Tangalakis

Specifications
- Mass: 6.8 t (6.7 long tons; 7.5 short tons)
- Length: 5.30 m (17 ft 5 in)
- Width: 2.17 m (7 ft 1 in)
- Height: 2.85 m (9 ft 4 in)
- Crew: 2 + 8 passengers
- Engine: 4-cylinder, petrol, 4712 cc 60 hp (45 kW)
- Payload capacity: 1,500 kg (3,300 lb)
- Maximum speed: 31 km/h

The SOMUA MCG was a half-track artillery tractor and recovery vehicle of the French forces during World War II.

Manufactured by the Somua company under licence from Citroën, it was used to tow medium artillery pieces such as the 155 mm mle 1917 howitzer and the 105 mm mle 1936 field gun, as well as their specific ammunition trailers. Of this main version 345 were produced: 264 until 1 September 1939 and another 81 until the end of May 1940.

There was also a recovery version, fitted with a crane, to recover broken-down tanks, of which about 440 were produced.

== Foreign use ==
After France's surrender, many SOMUA MCG and SOMUA MCL half-tracks were captured by the Germans and put to use in the German Army. Some were used as artillery tractors. Most were converted by Major Alfred Becker's workshop (Baustokommando Becker) into armoured half-tracks. These were used to fill a variety of roles in the 21st Panzer Division, when it was reformed after its destruction in North Africa campaign. Variants of these included an armoured rocket launcher with an 8 cm Raketen-Vielfachwerfer, a self-propelled mortar mounting an 8 cm Reihenwerfer multiple mortar array and a tank destroyer version with a 7.5 cm Pak 40 anti-tank gun.

Greece acquired 48 Somua MCG5 half-tracks and used them to tow 85 mm guns and 155 mm howitzers. An unknown quantity also went to Turkey.

== Gallery ==
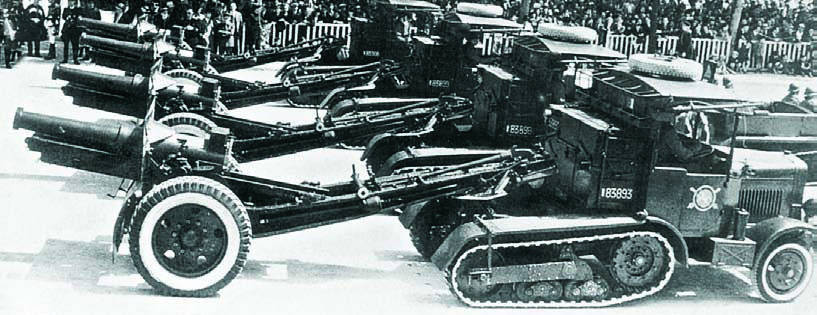

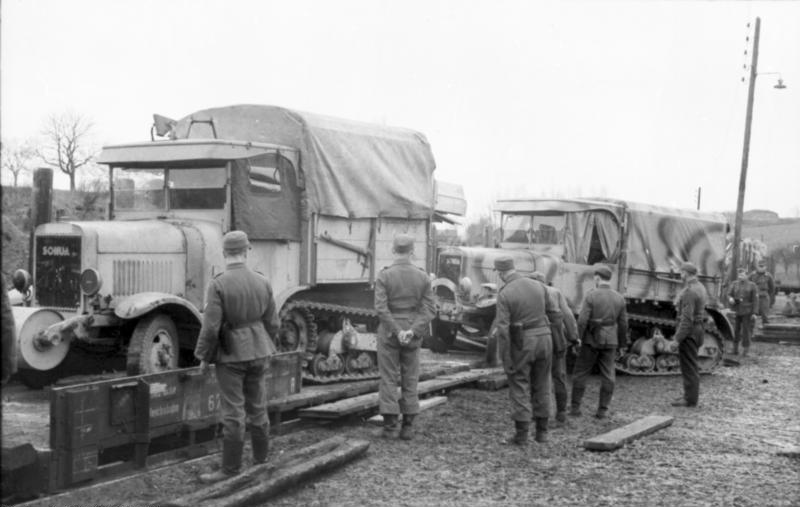

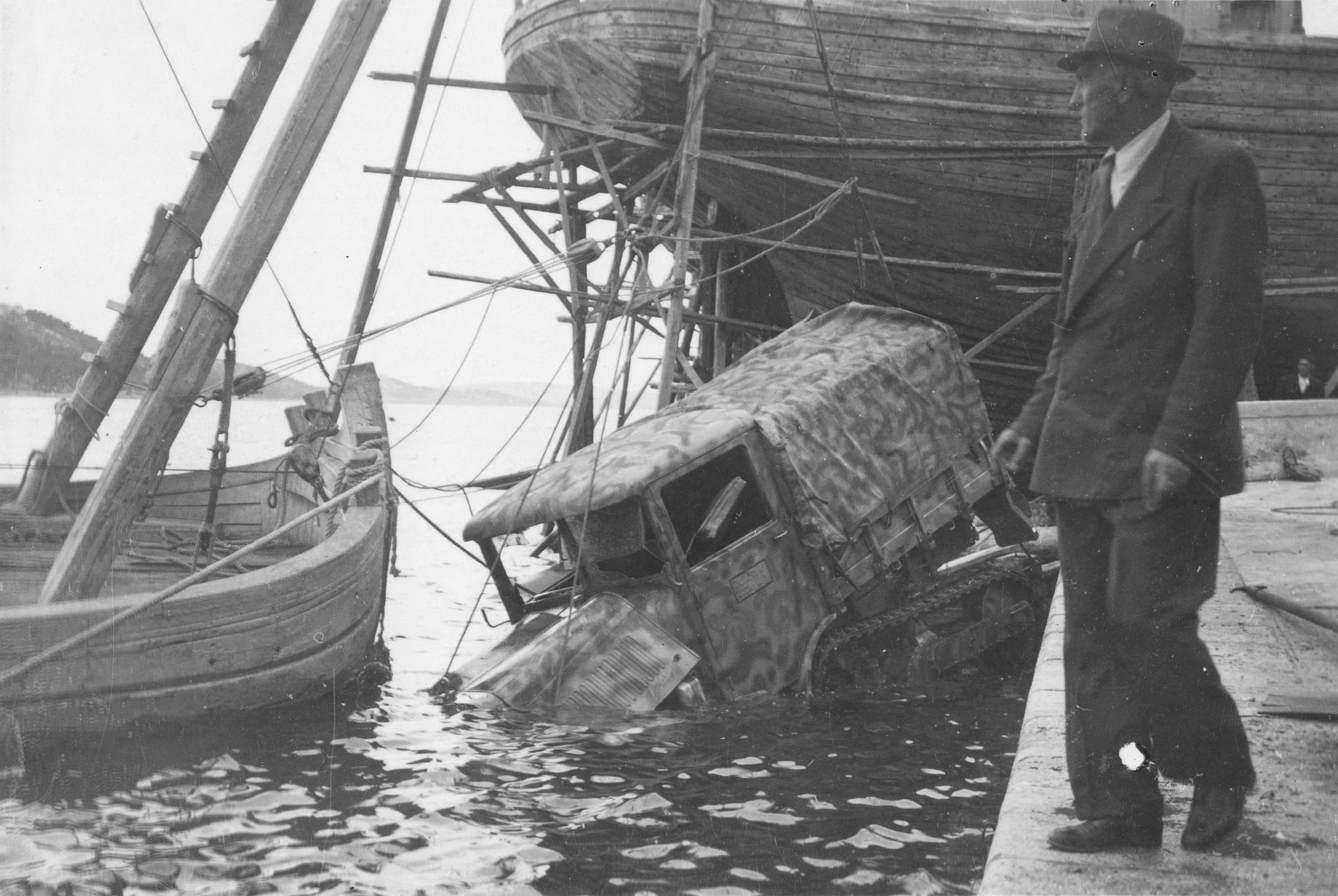
Somua MCG recovery in Lussinpiccolo 1943

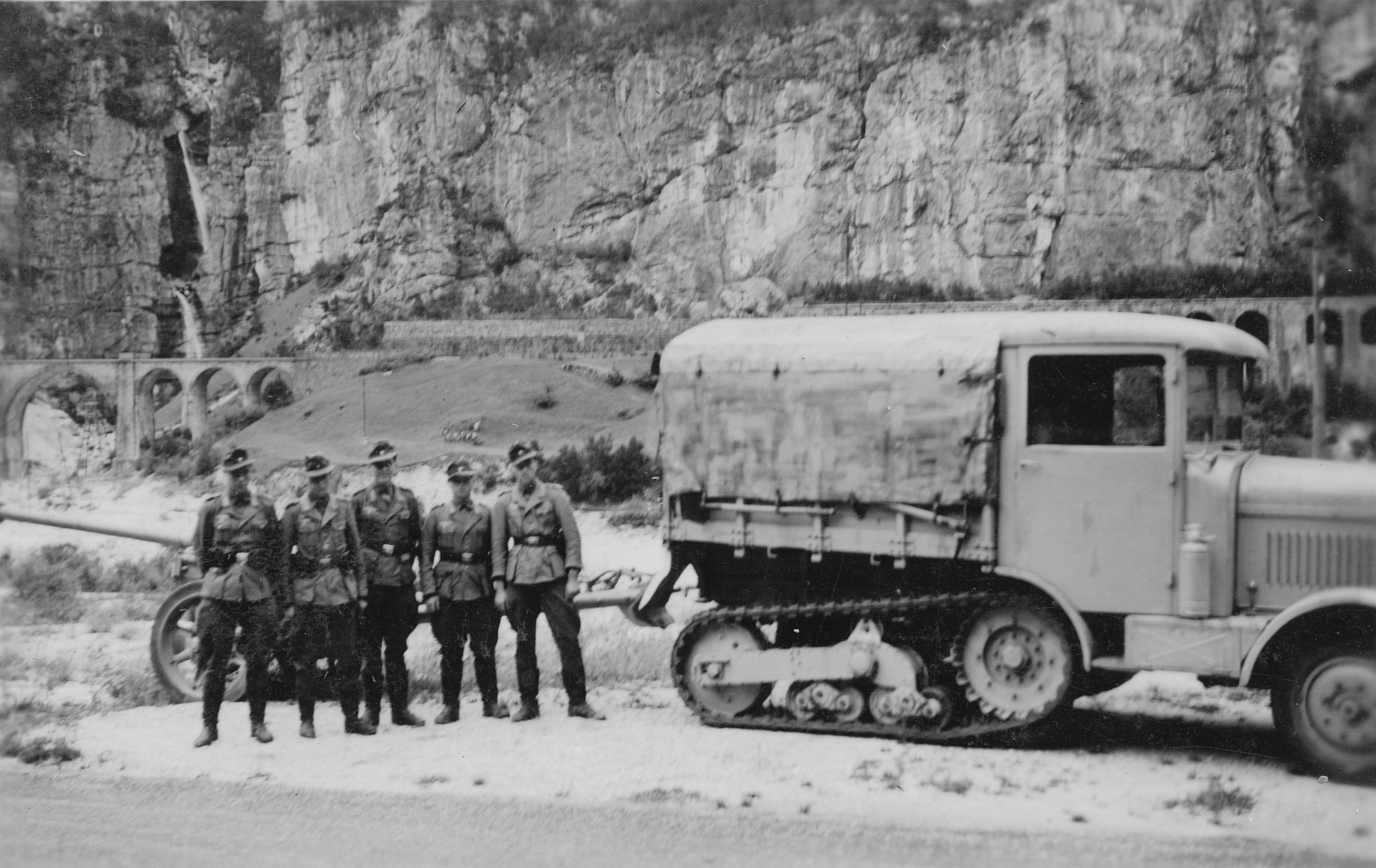
SOMUA MCG with PaK 40 in north Italy.

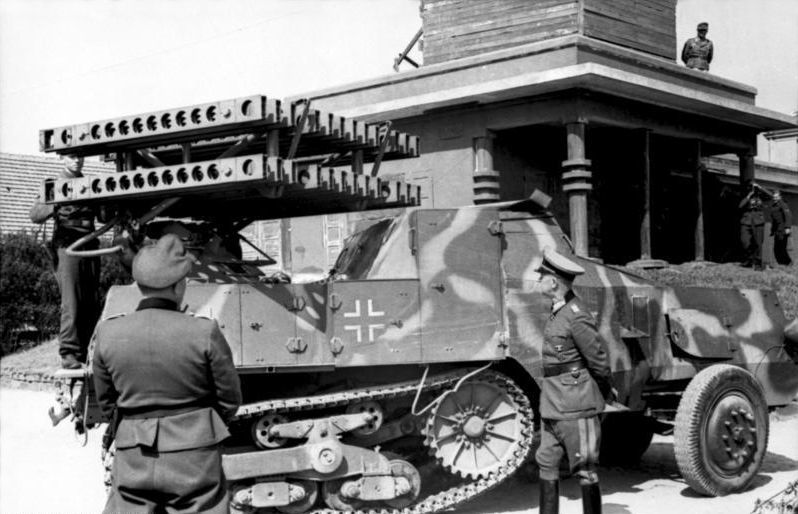
Armoured SOMUA MCL modified by Alfred Becker for use by the Wehrmacht

== Greek Made SOMUA MCG by Tangalakis SA. ==
The Greek army received 48 vehicles purchased from France in 1936. To save money, a complete vehicle was ordered as a model and the rest were ordered without a body, where they were manufactured in Greece by the company P. Tangalakis SA. Later known as Temax. They were used for the 48 disc Schneider 85mm/25 long guns.

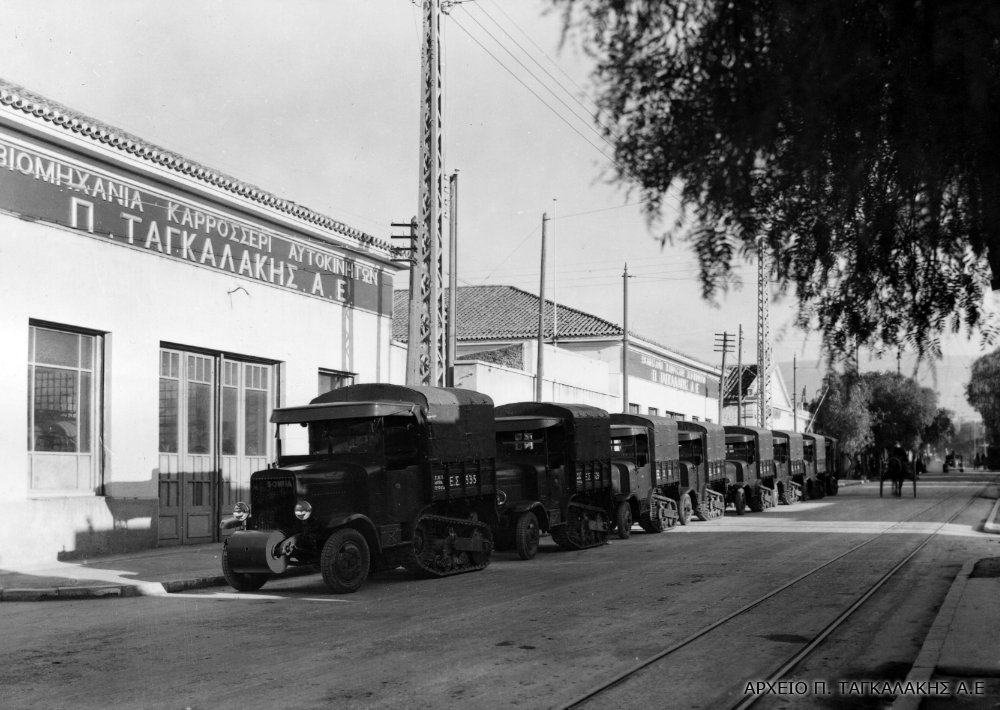
Tangalakis SOMUA MCG production

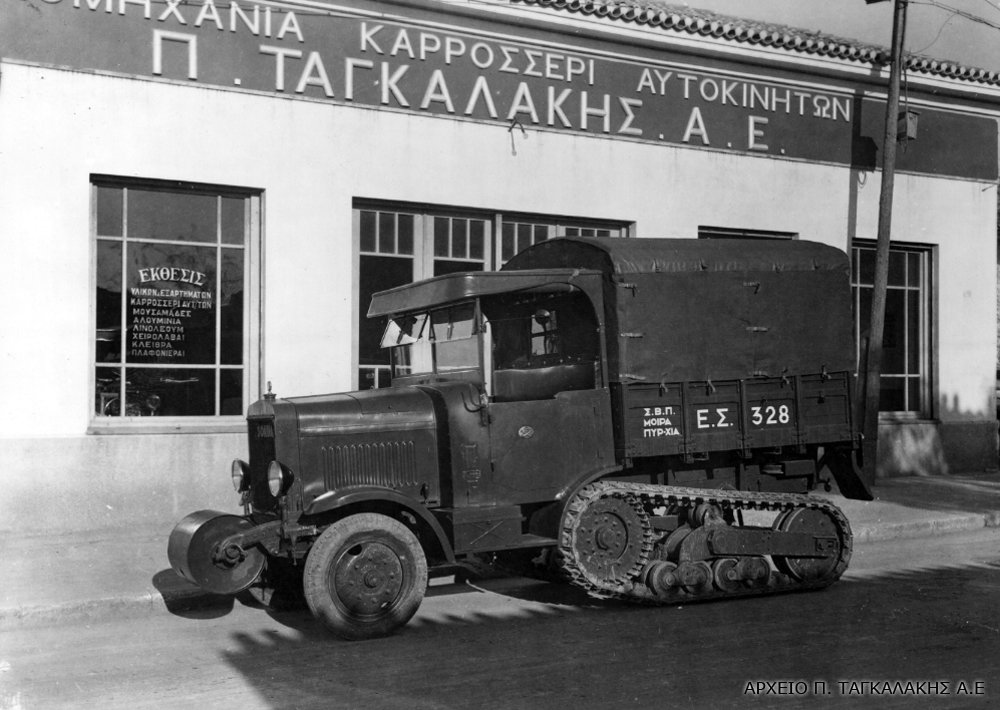
SOMUA MCG made by Tangalakis in Greece

== See also ==
- Adolphe Kégresse
- Kegresse track
- Unditching roller

== Bibliography ==
- Vauvillier, F. & Touraine, J.-M. L'automobile sous l'uniforme 1939-40, Massin, 1992, ISBN 2-7072-0197-9
