= Somua =

French machinery and vehicle manufacturer

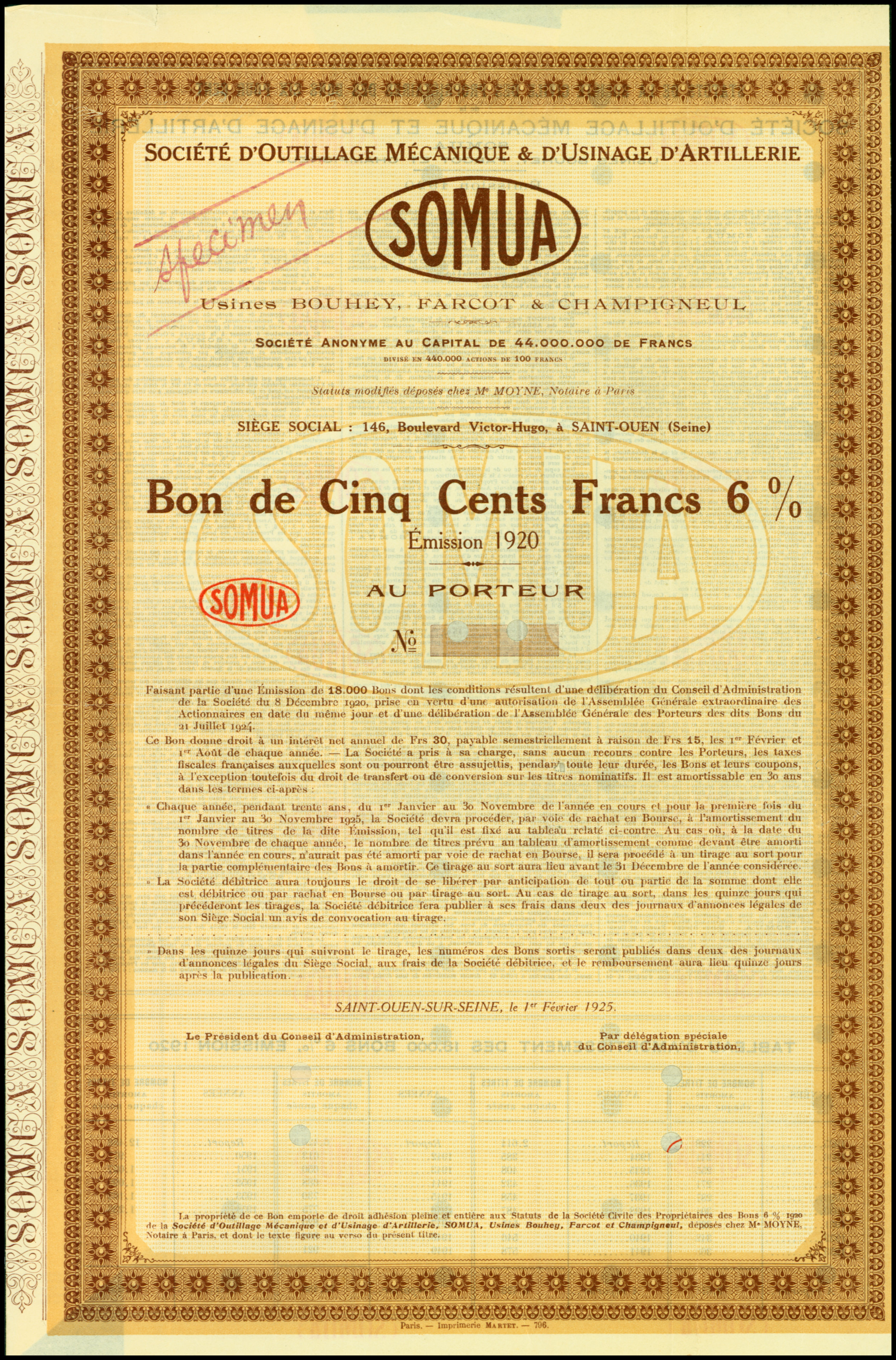
Bon of Somua, issued 1. February 1925

Somua (stylised in all caps), an acronym for Société d'outillage mécanique et d'usinage d'artillerie (lit. 'Mechanical Tooling and Artillery Machining Company'), was a French company that manufactured machinery and vehicles. It operated between 1914 and 1955. A subsidiary of Schneider-Creusot until sold to Renault in 1955, Somua was based in Saint-Ouen, a suburb of Paris.

== Overview ==
In 1930 Somua introduced several models of trucks equipped with advanced diesel engines, half cabins and three axles and with payloads from 10 to 13 tonnes. Somua also produced a lighter range with five to eight tonnes payload, equipped with gasoline engines. In 1936 Somua produced a railcar for PLM, the XS 1 to 11.

Arguably the most famous product in Somua's history was its 20-ton World War II tank, the Somua S35 and the Somua S40. Furthermore, France's first tank in 1916, the Schneider CA1, as well as later in 1918 some Renault FT tanks, were manufactured by Somua in their Saint-Ouen facility during World War I.

Somua's production of trucks practically ceased between 1943 and 1946. However, in 1944 the company developed a truck under license from the Swedish Hesselman company. Named the JL 12 and equipped with a flex-fuel four cylinder engine, the vehicle did not impress the "Commission des plans de modernisation de l'automobile", which decided in 1946 to combine Somua with Willème and Panhard to form a new grouping, the Générale française de l'automobile (GFA).

In 1946 Somua launched a new range of trucks, named JL 15, with a five-speed transmission to exploit the 130 horsepower delivered by the 8.6 liter six-cylinder diesel engine. It was available with six choices of chassis: 6.30 meters to 10.89 meters and 2 or 3 axles, supporting 11 to 16 tonnes payload. The JL 15 was available in truck or bus configuration - the models were respectively the JL 15T and JL 15LO.

In 1948 Somua built two double 1500 V DC EMU rail engines for SNCF. They mainly operated in the South West region of France.

Delivery began in 1950 of the Somua OP5 bus model to Paris public transport operator RATP.

In 1955 Somua introduced the JL 19, available with two or three axles and powered by a six-cylinder diesel engine, the D615 9.3 liter engine, producing 180 hp and with a manual ten-speed transmission. The JL 19 was available as a carrier or tractor, with five different chassis and with engines from a variety of manufacturers, and bore a payload of up to 26 tonnes. Around this time Latil (the heavyweight vehicle division of Renault) and Somua were merged under the LRS brand, which later became Saviem. Saviem kept manufacturing the JL as the Saviem JL 20, fitted with its own diesel engines.

The company was a minor manufacturer of trolleybuses, building a total of just 55: one in 1938 and the others in the period 1947–1955. Another French manufacturer, Vétra, supplied the "overwhelming majority" of trolleybuses in use on French systems during the relevant period. Somua-built trolleybuses used electrical propulsion equipment from Westinghouse.

== Gallery ==
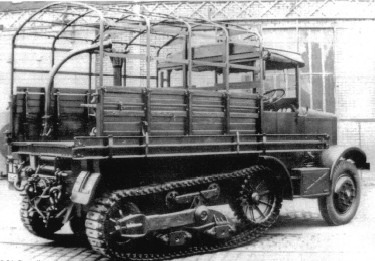
French medium Kégresse track SOMUA MCL-5 in 1939

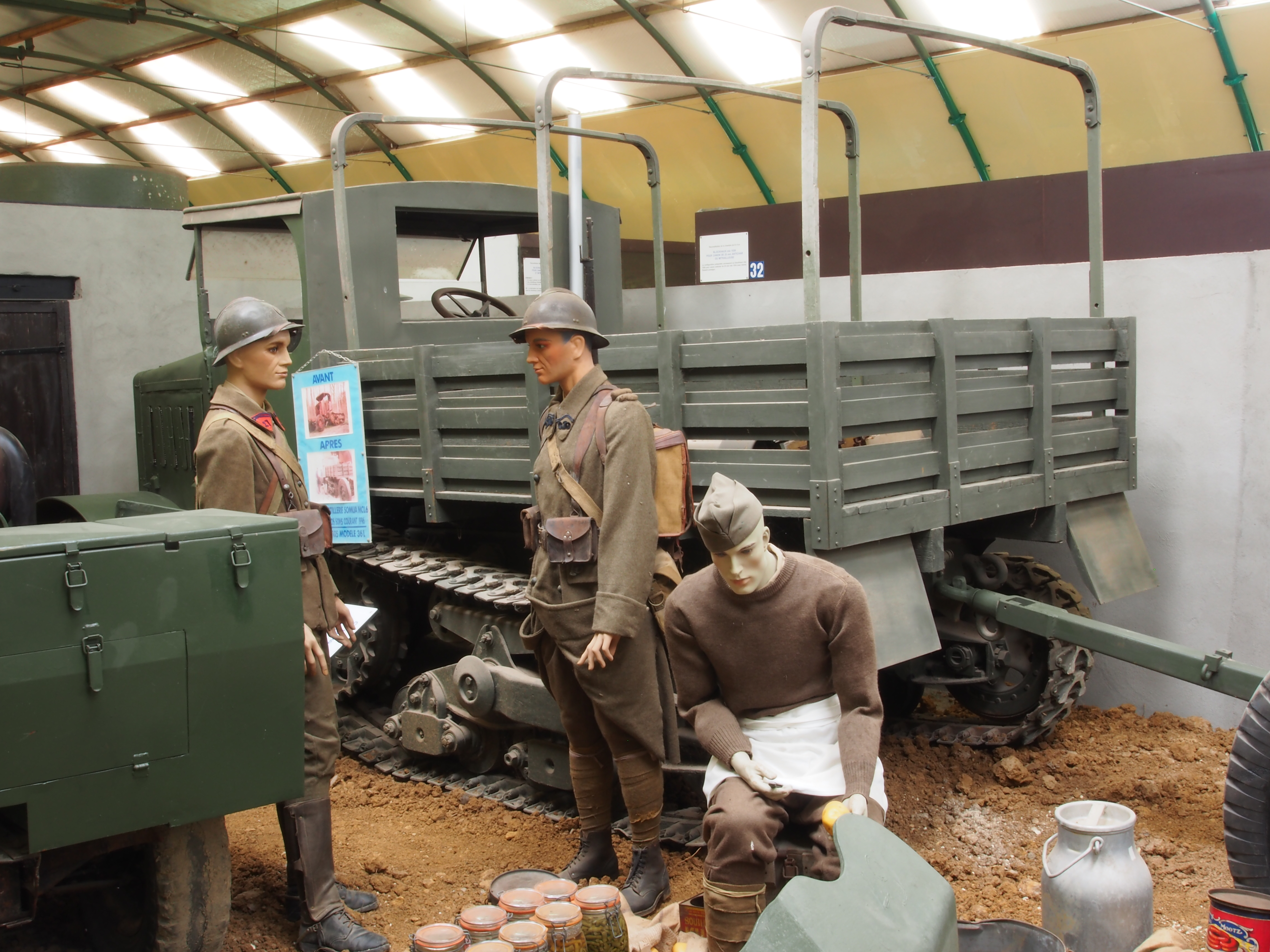
SOMUA MCL6 heavy artillery Kégresse track tractor, Fort de Fermont museum

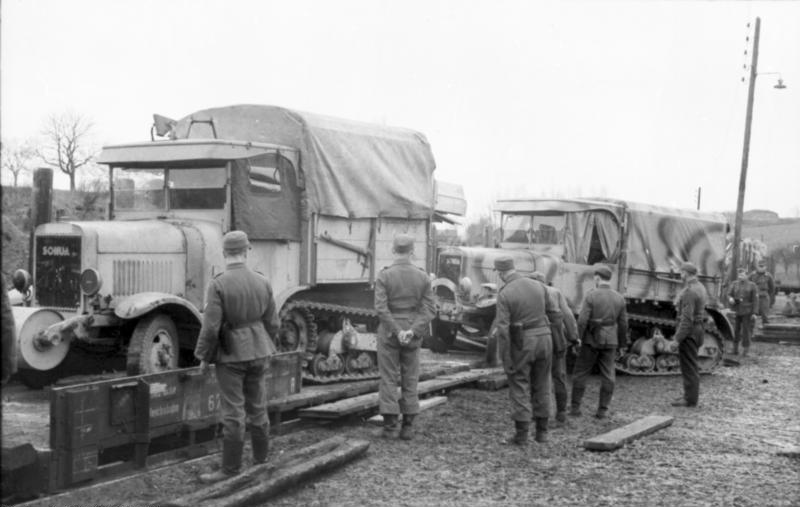
SOMUA MCG

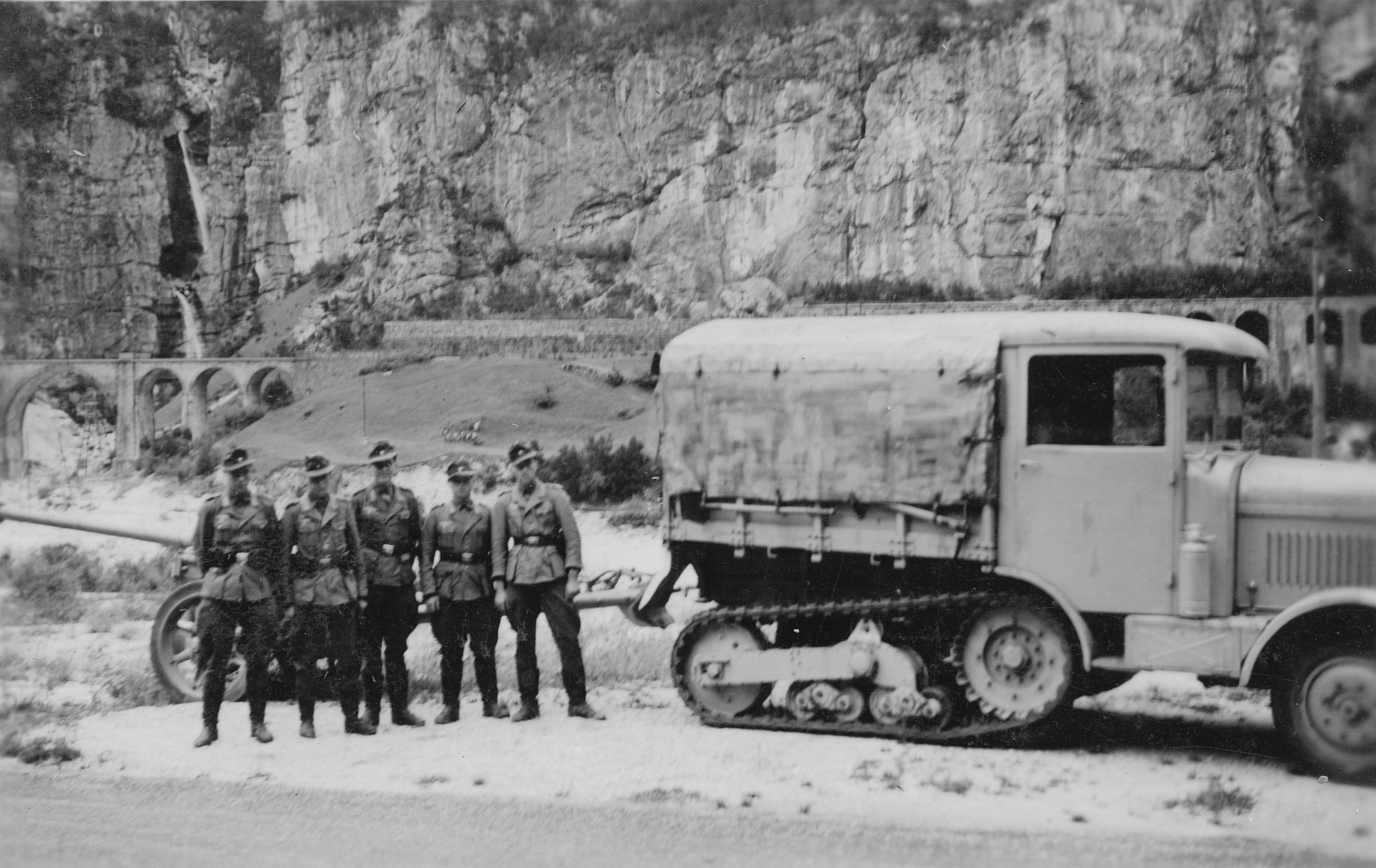
SOMUA MCG Kégresse track with PaK 40 in north Italy.

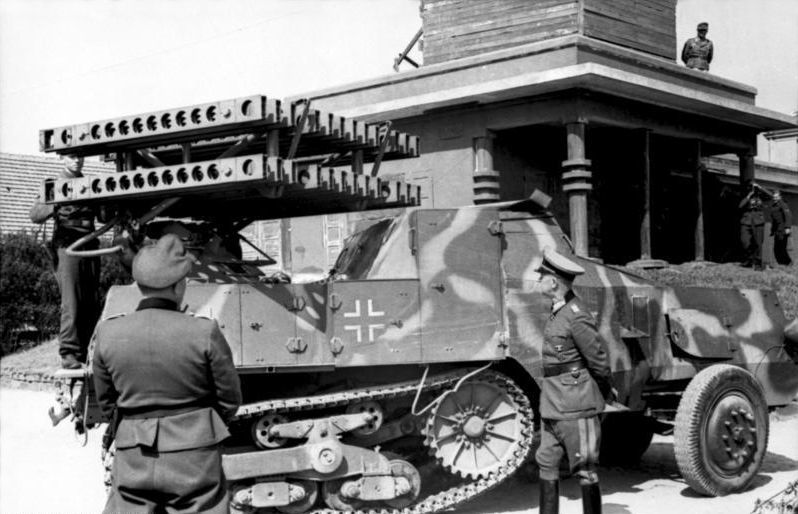
Armoured SOMUA MCL Kégresse track modified by Alfred Becker for use by the Wehrmacht

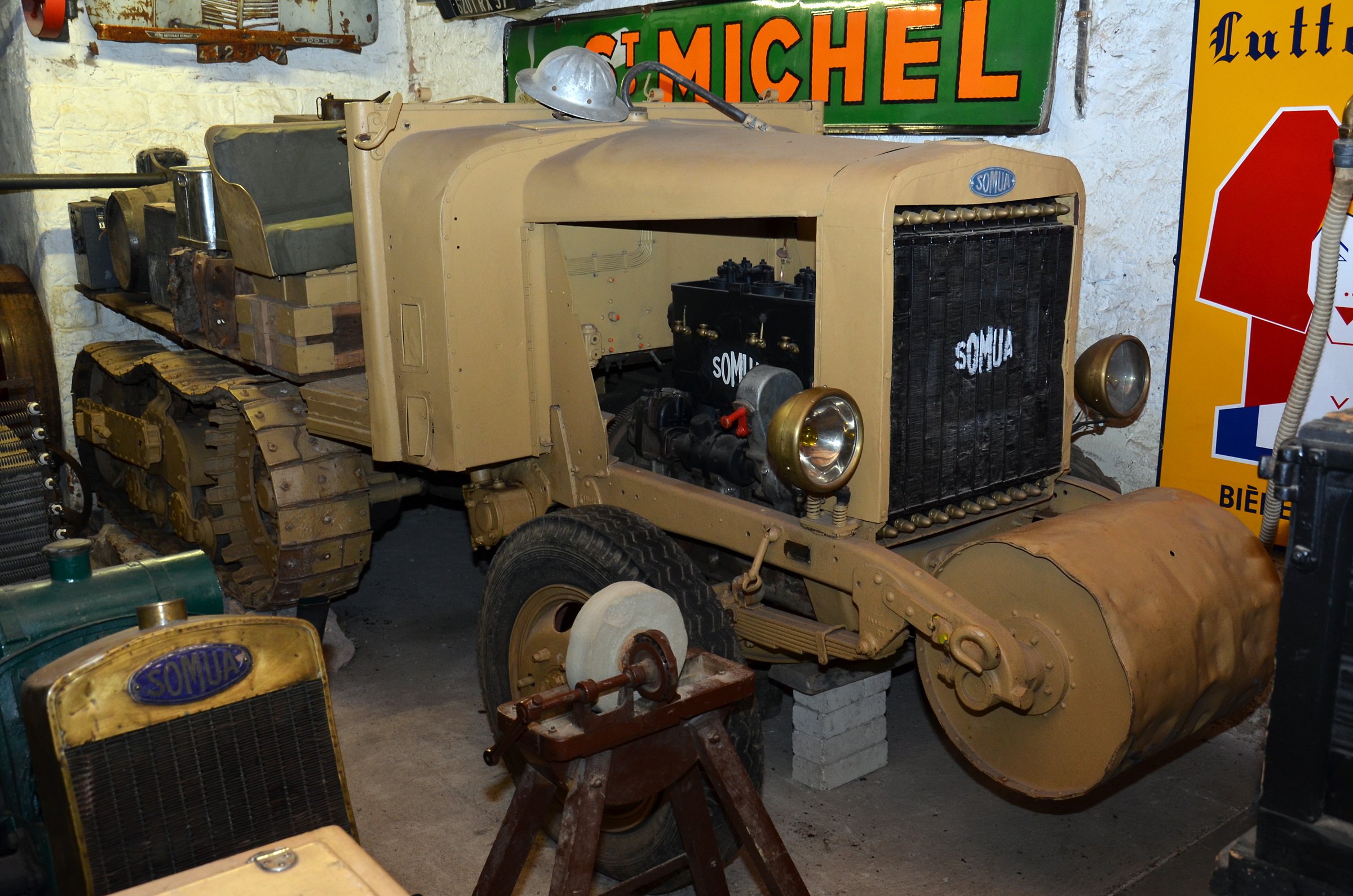
SOMUA Kégresse track tractor

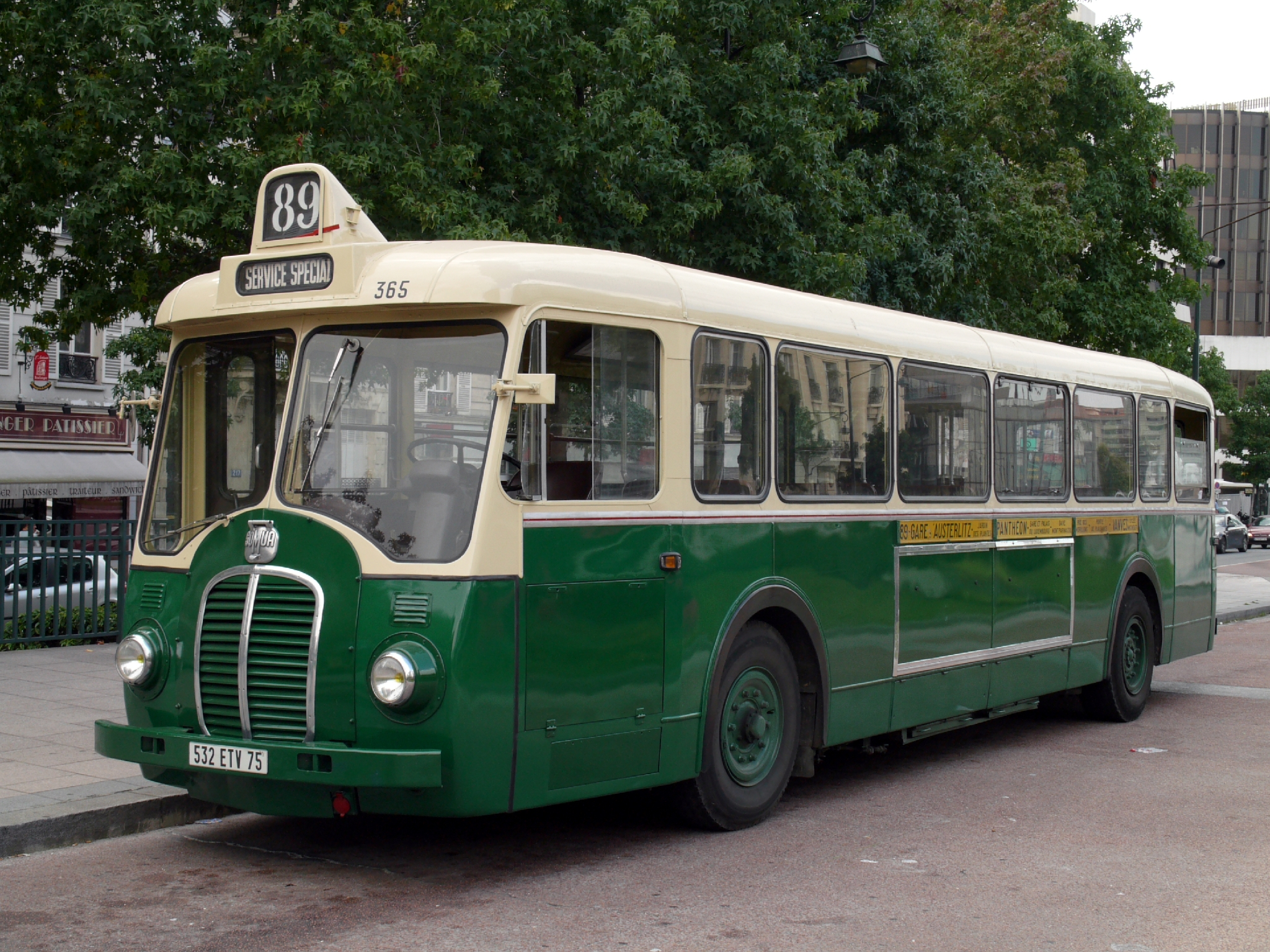
SOMUA OP5 Paris bus

== See also ==
- SOMUA MCG
- SOMUA SM
- SOMUA S35
