= P107 =

Type of Half-track prime mover/cargo transport

Unic P107 BU
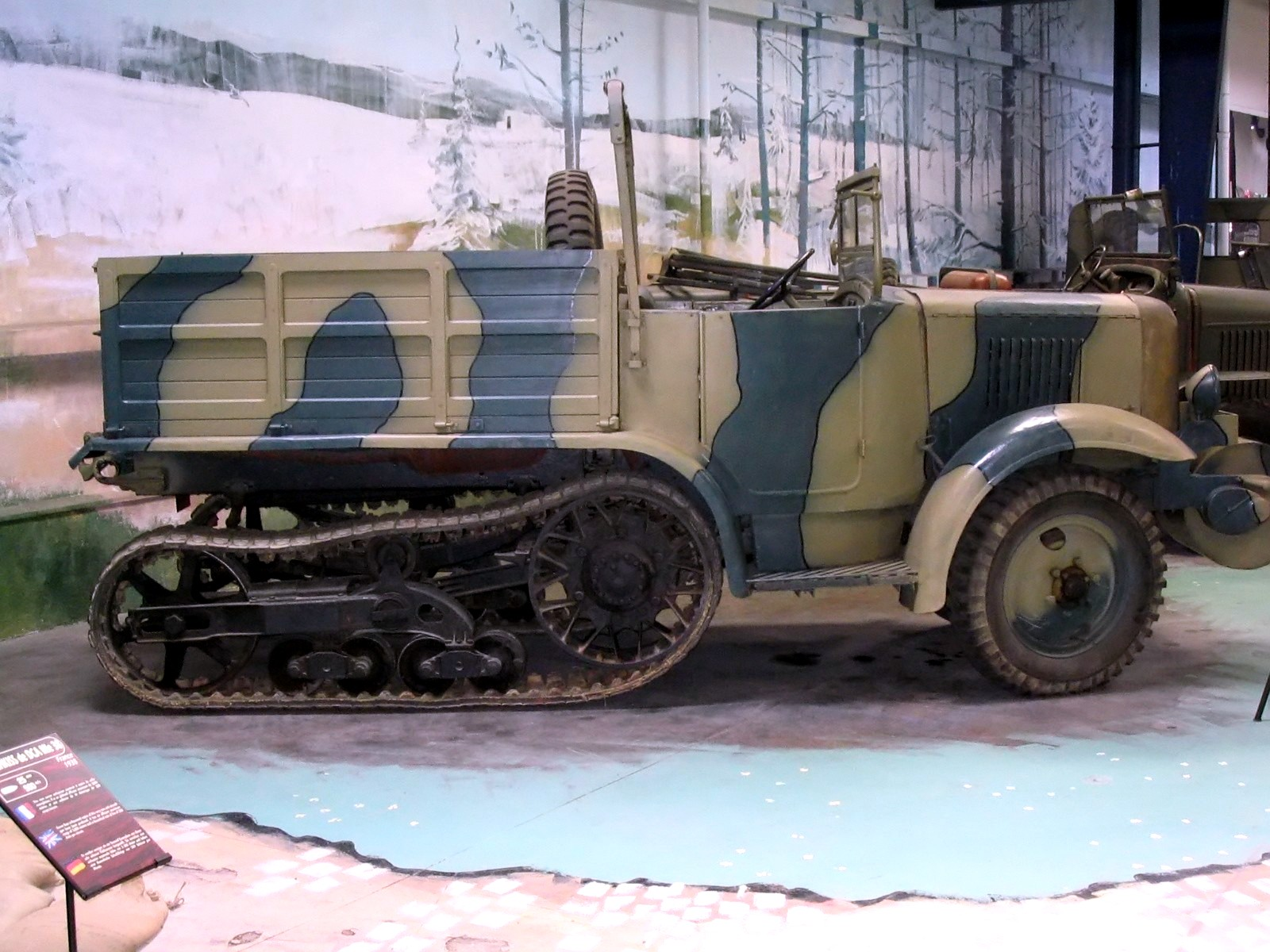
- P107 at Musée des Blindés
- Type: Half-track prime mover/cargo transport
- Place of origin: France

Service history
- Used by: France, Nazi Germany

Production history
- Designed: 1934
- Manufacturer: Unic
- Produced: 1935-1940
- No. built: 3,276

Specifications
- Mass: 3,500 kg (3.4 long tons) empty 5,000 kg (4.9 long tons) loaded
- Length: 4.85 m (15 ft 11 in)
- Width: 1.80 m (5 ft 11 in)
- Height: 2.28 m (7 ft 6 in)
- Crew: 2+5
- Armor: none
- Engine: P39 liquid-cooled 4-cylinder, 4-stroke OHV, 3450cc 62 hp (46 kW) at 2800 rpm
- Payload capacity: 1,500 kg (3,300 lb)
- Suspension: Leaf-spring
- Maximum speed: 45 km/h (28 mph)

The P107 was a World War II French half-track.

== History ==
In the 1920s and 1930s Citroën developed a long line of half-tracks based on the Kégresse patent. In 1934, the company introduced its newest and more powerful P107 model as a successor to the Citroën-Kégresse P17. But before mass production could take place, Citroën went bankrupt and its new owner, Michelin, chose to focus on the civilian markets. Unic was therefore able to acquire a license for the Kégresse patent, and took over the production of the P107. From 1937, the vehicles built by Unic received various designations, such as P 107 B, P 107 BU or P 107 U1.

The first order was made in 1935. Two main variants of the P107 were accepted in French military service: a light prime mover for the 75 mm, short 105 mm Bourges and short 105 mm Schneider guns, and a platform cargo transport for engineer units. A third version was also delivered to transmission units. 1,274 examples were delivered before the war and 1,896 more were delivered until June 1940.

== Foreign use ==
60 P 107s were ordered by Poland on 27 August 1939 but on 22 September they were recalled to France while en route to Poland.

During World War II, the Germans used these captured half-tracks extensively under the name leichter Zugkraftwagen 37 U304(f) to tow various anti-tank guns. With German half-tracks in short supply, Major Alfred Becker of the 21. Panzerdivision (which in 1944 was stationed near Caen in Normandy) suggested converting captured French vehicles. He ordered the conversion of available Unic half-tracks into leichter Schützenpanzerwagen ("light armoured personnel carriers").

== Sources ==
- Vauvillier, François; Touraine, Jean-Michel (1992). L'automobile sous l'uniforme 1939-40 (in French). Massin. ISBN 2-7072-0197-9.
