= Alfred Becker =

German engineer and military officer (1899–1981)

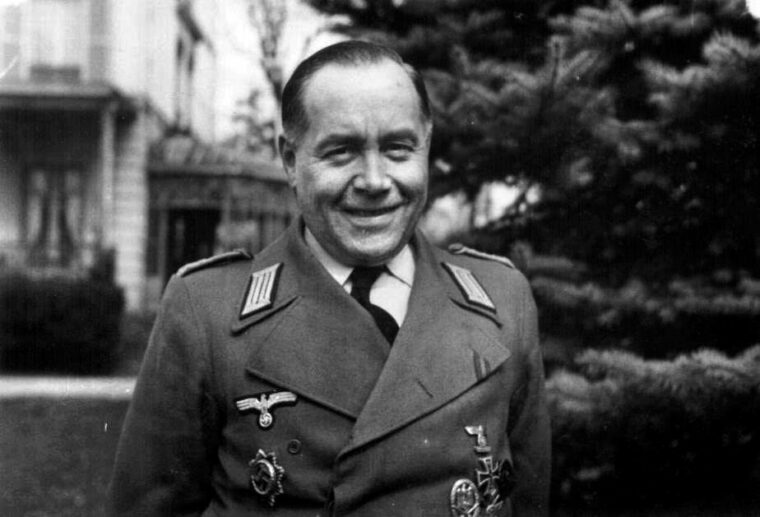
- Becker c. 1943-44
- Born: 20 August 1899; Krefeld, Rhine Province, Kingdom of Prussia, German Empire
- Died: 26 December 1981 (aged 82); Viersen (Krefeld am Rhein), West Germany
- Military career
- Allegiance: German Empire (to 1918); Nazi Germany (to 1945)
- Branch: Imperial German Army; German Army
- Service years: 1916–1918; 1939–1945
- Rank: Major
- Commands: 12th Battery, 227th Artillery Regiment, 227th Infantry Division; Baustocommando Becker; Sturmgeschütz Abteilung 200
- Conflicts: World War I World War II: Battle of the Netherlands; Siege of Leningrad; Battle of Normandy
- Awards: Knight's Cross of the War Merit Cross; German Cross in Gold

Alfred Becker (20 August 1899 – 26 December 1981) was a German engineer and artillery officer who served during the First and Second World Wars. During the Second World War he took captured British and French vehicles and refurbished and rebuilt them to supply the German army with armoured fighting vehicles. With his engineering and organizational skills, he converted the Hotchkiss plant on the outskirts of Paris into a vehicle modification and fabrication center. He used the vehicles to motorize German guns, rocket launchers and mortars. Working with Altmärkische Kettenwerk Gmbh (Alkett), steel shielding was shipped from Germany to armour the vehicles. The men from his artillery command did the metal work and conversion on 1,800 recovered vehicles.

During the winter of 1943-44 Becker's work focused on equipping the 21st Panzer Division. He used the tracked carriages of French light tanks to mobilize the 7.5 cm Pak 40 anti-tank gun and the 10.5 cm leFH 18 howitzer. Becker had the tank turrets removed, mounted the guns upon the chassis and placed steel plates around the crew compartment to give them some measure of protection. The vehicles were formed into a fire support unit, the Sturmgeschütz Abteilung 200. Becker was made the commander of this motorized assault gun battalion, and led the unit during the battles in Normandy. Some of Becker's unit escaped the encirclement at Falaise and they retreated across France and into Belgium. Becker was captured in Alsace on the French/German border in December 1944.

== First World War ==
Becker was born and raised in Krefeld. At the outset of The Great War, Becker volunteered at the age of 15. He served in the artillery and became an officer. He was awarded the Iron Cross for his actions at Verdun and again at Cambrai. He was injured by poison gas a few weeks before the end of the war.

== Interwar period ==
Following the armistice Becker attended university and earned a doctorate in mechanical engineering. He worked as a designer in the textile industry and was co-owner of the company Volkmann & Company in Krefeld. He also formed a small manufacturing firm, Alfred Becker AG of Bielefeld.

== World War II ==
=== Battery chief ===
On 28 August 1939 Becker was called up to serve in the 227th Infantry Division "Rhine-Westphalian", drawn from the Krefeld area during the 3rd wave mobilization. Becker was made an officer in the division's 15th Artillery Regiment, under the command of Lieutenant-Colonel Edgar Feuchtinger. He was rapidly promoted to the rank of captain and made Batterychief of Battery #12. When Germany invaded Poland the 227th Infantry Division was on the western frontier with the 5th Army performing border protection in the Eifel region, near Belgium.

In December 1939 Becker's division was reassigned and became a part of Army Group B under command of Generalfeldmarshall Fedor von Bock, in preparation for Fall Gelb. Becker's artillery regiment was re-numbered the 227th Artillery Regiment. On 10 May 1940 the division engaged in the offensive into the Netherlands and Belgium as part of the 18th Army. Becker's artillery battery provided fire support as the division made its way through Enschede and Deventer. All the guns in Becker's artillery regiment were pulled by horse drawn limbers and caissons, the standard practice for infantry divisions of the Heer. Becker's division reached the Grebbe line, where it was held up for three days. An attack on 13 May supported by artillery fire was unable to break the line. That night the Dutch forces withdrew under the cover of night. When the 227th went in to resume the attack the next morning they found the positions abandoned. Becker and the 227th crossed the Leie and continued the advance, taking Amersfoort just before the Dutch capitulation on 19 May 1940.

While his unit was at Amersfoort Becker came across the abandoned motor transport of a well-equipped Dutch artillery regiment. There were a large number of heavy vehicles which he believed he could use. To pull the artillery pieces, a battery such as Becker's depended on the use of 126 horses. To replace them, Becker chose the large wheeled Brossel TAL artillery lorry. Becker used other captured Belgian trucks to motorize the field piece transport of his division's reconnaissance battalion, thereby increasing this unit's mobility as well. The limbers were left behind, and later transported to France by rail. Motorizing the transport for his battery made it far more mobile, allowing his battery to keep up with the advance of the division's lead elements.

=== Early conversions ===
Following the German victory in France in July 1940 the 227th Division was assigned occupation, security and coastal defense duties along the Normandy coast near Le Havre. There Becker came across many discarded British light tanks and light personnel carriers. After achieving improved mobility by use of motor tractors, Becker considered the benefits that could be derived from mounting the guns directly onto the abandoned motorized carriages. Becker selected the light but reliable British Light Tank Mk.VI, more than 300 of which had been left behind, for the undercarriage. The design of this British light tank made them suitable for use as artillery self-propelled guns, since the motor, transmission, steering assembly and drive wheels were all grouped together in the front of the chassis, leaving the rear of the vehicle available for the gun and crew. The superstructure and turret of the tanks were removed, replaced by the installation of an artillery gun. The vehicle used a four-man crew. Though the men in his battery had occupation duties, like Becker they were from Krefeld, an area with a strong manufacturing heritage. Many of his men had worked in manufacturing jobs and were skilled metal workers. Recruiting the men of his battery and working by shift day and night, he set about his project. Becker had the machine gun turret removed and mounted a 10.5 cm leFH 16 howitzer upon the chassis. The lightweight chassis of the Mk VI did not provide much mass to act as a counter to the heavy gun. To stabilize the howitzer when firing, Becker arrived at the solution to direct the recoil forces to the ground through a lowered rear spur. Becker's personal relationship with Deutsche Edelstahlwerke Gmbh in Krefeld secured the 20 mm thick armor plates used to protect the crew compartment. In six months his unit succeeded in creating a complete battery, mobilizing twelve of the battalion's 10.5 cm leFH 16 howitzers to make the 10.5 cm leFH 16 Geschützwagen Mk VI 736 (e), and he mounted six of the larger 15 cm sFH 13 guns on a larger chassis. In addition, he built twelve munitions-carrying versions of the Mk.VI, several munitions-carrying versions of the Bren gun carrier and four armoured command tank versions of the Mk. VI.

By mobilizing his guns Becker had built the first battery of self-propelled artillery. This marked the start of a development that led to the creation of a separate tank artillery, and was a significant contribution to the further development of the panzer division. The battery's initial test firing was done at the range at Harfleur near Le Havre, France. The complete battery was tested at the training grounds at Beverloo, Belgium. For his work on mobilizing the artillery pieces Becker was awarded the German Cross in Gold.

In June 1941 the German army invaded Soviet Russia. In September Becker and his 227th Infantry Division were transferred to Army Group North. His was the only infantry division on the Eastern Front to have a motorized artillery battery. By December the division had become involved in fighting near Leningrad. Becker's homemade self-propelled guns of the 12th Battery proved successful. Due to its mobility, Becker's unit was used as a fire brigade to reinforce areas that were in distress.

Over the course of the campaign it became apparent that German infantry formations had great difficulty defending against Soviet tank attacks. The standard anti-tank gun in use, the 3.7 cm Pak 36, did not have the penetrative power to stop the larger Soviet tanks, and the high mobility of the Soviet tank forces made it difficult to get the higher caliber weapons to where they were needed. Alkett had earlier made a conversion vehicle when they mounted a 4,7 cm Pak (t) anti-tank gun on a French Renault R35 chassis, and from May to October in 1941 had produced 174 of these Panzerjäger Geschützwagen. They also used the Renault R35 to produce the Führungsfahrzeuge ausgeliefert, which simply was the R35 with the turret removed to make a tractor. They produced 26 units of the tractor version.

Becker was ordered back from the east front to the Alkett company to consider a means by which they might mobilize the 7.5 cm Pak 40 anti-tank gun. Becker and the Alkett consultants worked closely together on the solution of the overall concept. Among the vehicles they considered for the project was the French built Lorraine tractor, about 360 of which had fallen into German hands. Due to its reliability, the Lorraine was well suited to the maneuver warfare battles the Germans favoured. The captured tractors had been first used by the Germans to pull artillery pieces, and were renamed the Lorraine Schlepper (f). These tractors provided the German army with a fully tracked vehicle to carry supplies or tow artillery pieces. Such a vehicle was badly needed due to the extremely poor road conditions in Russia, all the more so as the Germans had not yet produced such a vehicle themselves. The Lorraine chassis looked to be a good choice, as unlike German tank designs, the engine in the Lorraine was housed in the front of the vehicle, leaving the rear portion open for the housing and operation of the gun.

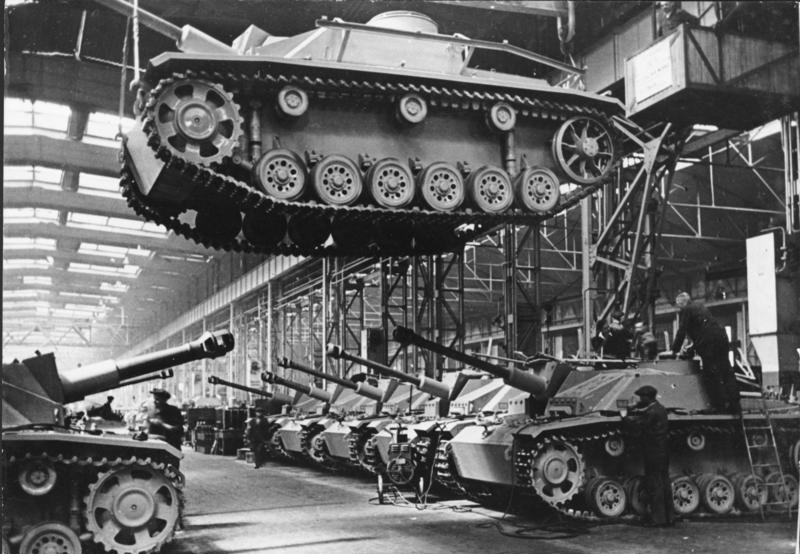
The Alkett production plant

On 25 May 1942 a presentation of a self-propelled gun based on the Lorraine tractor was made. The presentation was successful and the decision made that all 160 Lorraine tractors still available should be converted into self-propelled guns, with 60 of them mounting the 7.5 cm Pak 40. On 4 June 1942, a final decision was made by Field Marshal Wilhelm Keitel on the 78 Lorraine tractors repaired at the HKP Bielitz, and another 24 tractors were released for mounting of the 7.5 cm Pak 40. This became the Marder I tank hunter that was used initially to provide a mobile anti-tank defense for infantry divisions in the east.

In August 1942, one of the Becker-designed vehicles was withdrawn at the request of the German Army High Command, the Oberkommando des Heeres (OKH), and shipped to Berlin. On 2 September 1942 it was presented in the garden of the Reich Chancellery by Becker and one of his crews to Adolf Hitler and officers in charge of the Army Ordnance Office. The demonstration was a success. The OKH chose Alkett in Berlin-Spandau to create more of these self-propelled artillery pieces. The Army Ordnance Department had made use of the Alkett plant in Berlin for this kind of work previously due to their manufacturing flexibility and workers skilled in solving problems in tank construction. Becker was transferred to this company and given access to their experience and expertise.

Becker's assignment at Alkett was to create mobile field pieces for Rommel in North Africa. The battles of the open desert placed a premium on mobility. Becker chose the French Lorraine Schlepper ammunition carriers as the platform for a self-propelled 150 mm sFH 18 heavy field howitzer. The Lorraine chassis, with its forward engine design, lent itself to this conversion. This vehicle, known then as 15 cm sFH13/1 (Sf) auf Geschützwagen Lorraine Schlepper (f), met with great approval from the OKH. The vehicles were shipped to North Africa for use with the Afrika Korps. (Note: Of the thirty vehicles shipped, seven were lost in transit when their cargo vessel was sunk. Twenty-three arrived safely and were put into use by the Afrika Korps.)

After Becker had completed this project he was ordered by Hitler to return to France, take an inventory of all remaining British and French armored vehicles, and determine if they were suitable for German requirements. He was then to collect them and convert them to practical German use. The order required Becker to create enough usable equipment to form "at least" two panzer divisions.

=== Baukommando Becker ===
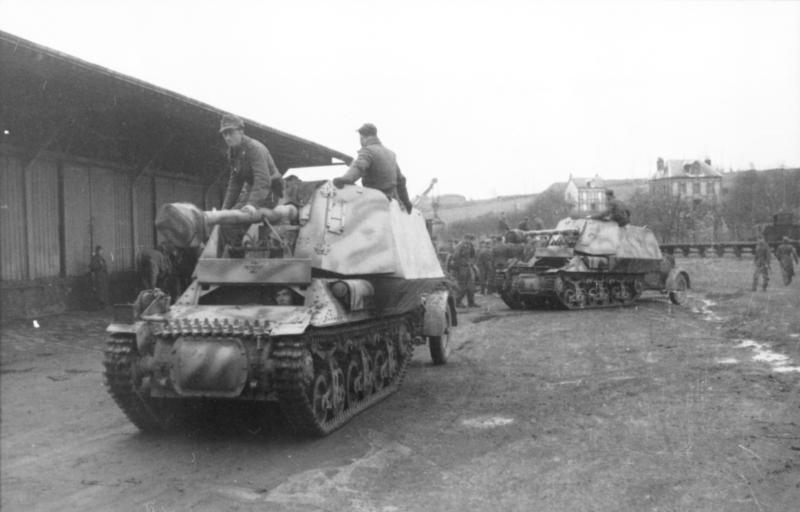
Marder Is in France, 1943

Under the authority of the Reich Minister for Armaments and War Production Baukommando Becker (Construction Unit Becker) was created. The command made use of three factories in France, the Matford Factory, the Talbot Factory and the Hotchkiss Factory, all near Paris. A large quantity of damaged Allied military vehicles were available in France, but their utility in 1942 was in serious doubt. Those French armoured vehicles undamaged following the campaign of 1940 had been assigned to occupation forces, training units and anti-partisan forces. These early French built tanks, designed with small gun turrets and mounting small caliber main guns, were of little value in 1942 for combat against such weapons as the Soviet T-34. The German army did not assign them to front line troops. Though lightly armoured and under-gunned by the combat standards of the day, these were fully tracked vehicles, a feature which Becker believed could be usefully exploited. In addition to the wrecked and captured French and British tanks, Becker also had access to a large number of soft-skinned half-tracked vehicles such as the SOMUA MCG and the smaller Unic P107. These vehicles were in various states of disrepair, mostly located in northern France but present throughout the whole country, often left out and rusting in the elements. The task before Becker was enormous. Becker set up his headquarters at the Matford Factory in Poissy in the Paris outskirts, just northwest of the city. He organized his men into special parties to commence a thorough search of the occupied territory in the west for wrecked vehicles previously thought useful only for scrapping. Vehicles were recovered from streams, rivers and fields and collected at the repair facilities near Paris. The vehicles collected were divided into three main groups: those requiring minor repairs and refits, those requiring major repair and refits, and those that were beyond use and were to be used as a source for spare parts. Becker was assigned an engineering staff, who set about their work modifying what was available.

The wrecks were disassembled, cleaned, and changes to the design were worked out. Then an assembly line was set up at one of the factories to do a production line on the type and a run of the modified vehicles was created. The bodies of the overhauled vehicles were given purpose appropriate superstructures. Becker's basic idea for the conversion was straightforward in principle: he would build a prototype of the replacement superstructure by framing it out of wood panels and sending these to Alkett. Alkett would then produce a run of replacement superstructures made out of steel. These were then shipped back to France where Becker had completed the engineering plans for the conversion. The conversion process was streamlined, the Hotchkiss assembly line was brought up and a run of assembly was completed. The vehicles were refitted and repaired by importance, all of one type at a time. Remaining parts were stored away for spares. A special effort was made to guarantee that a spare parts supply would be available. For important parts subject to special wear a 10% supply of parts was created, while for parts subject to general wear a 30% supply of parts was stored up. Leftover materials were shipped back to the steelworks.

The most innovative aspect of the work was the battle-value assessment of the vehicles, that is determining how to make the most effective use of each vehicle type in relation to the current battlefield conditions. From 1942 through 1943 Becker salvaged all the usable tank wreckage that could be found in France. Some 1,800 armoured fighting vehicles were created at his Baukommando Becker, which produced a variety of innovative designs. From July to August 1942 Becker converted 170 armoured vehicles into the Marder I. A further 106 chassis were converted into self-propelled artillery pieces, with 94 conversions to carry the 150 mm howitzer, and 12 more for the 105 mm. In addition, he produced 30 artillery observation vehicles using this same chassis.

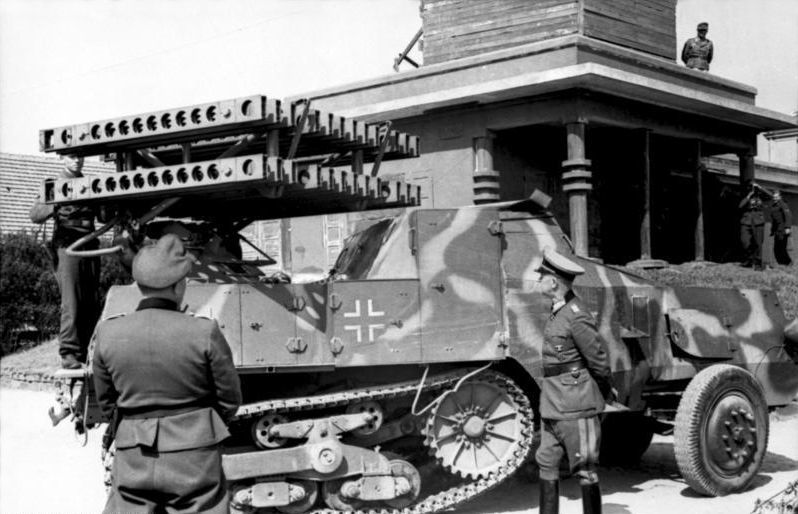
Becker stands by during presentation of one of his Vielfachwerfer, mounted on an armourized French SOMUA MCG.

The artillerymen of the 12th Battery that Becker had left in Russia were in harsh conditions. Battling the cold and engaged in heavy fighting, over time their vehicles were slowly lost, either due to mines or from direct fire from Soviet tanks. When their guns were lost the surviving crews were put to use as infantrymen. The 227th Infantry Division was involved in heavy fighting near Leningrad defending against the Red Army's main offensive at Sinyavino Heights and the south shore of Lake Ladoga. From August through September 1942 the division suffered many casualties in this offensive, which was called the Battle of Lake Ladoga. Concerned for the men in his old unit and needing their skills for the work he was doing, Becker requested the transfer of the men from the 12th Battery back to his command in Paris. Strict rules prohibited such transfers of operational troops from Russia to France. Contacting his old divisional commander, Becker devised a work around. Making use of mandatory leave requirements, the commander of the 227th Infantry Division sent ten of Becker's Krefelders back to Germany each week. When their leave was up the men were ordered to France to report for duty at Baustab Becker. By Christmas 1942 almost all of Becker's men had reached Paris. In exchange Becker provided the commander of the 227th Infantry Division with 20 of his armoured vehicles.

In 1943 Becker began conversion of the Hotchkiss H35 and H39 light tanks, which had carried a 37 mm gun. He refitted them to mount a 7.5 cm Pak 40 anti-tank gun or 10.5 cm leFH 16 howitzer assault gun. These were the units that were used extensively in the equipping of the reformed 21st Panzer Division, and can be seen in images of Rommel reviewing the unit in May 1944.

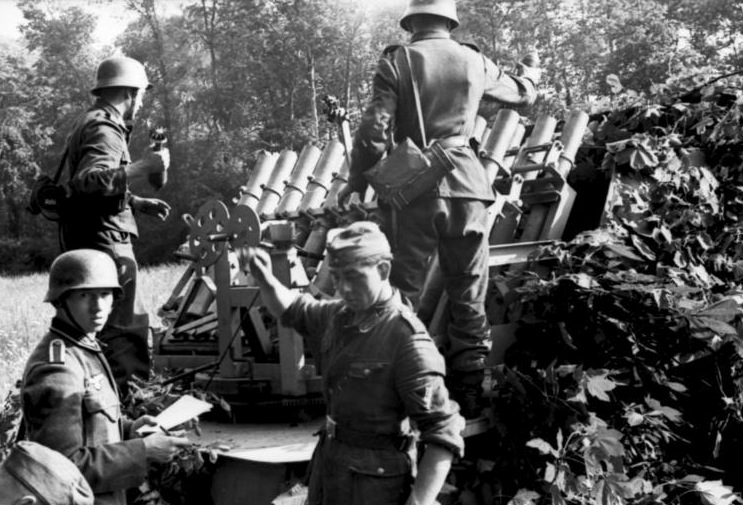
A Reihenwerfer mounted on a SOMUA MCL being loaded

Another major project undertaken at this time was the work he did on the soft-skinned French half-tracked vehicles, the SOMUA MCG and the Unic P107. Both these vehicles were armoured to make them more survivable in the battle environment. In addition he used the SOMUA MCG as a platform for a number of weapons, including the Nebelwerfer, the Vielfachwerfer, and the Reihenwerfer, his own creation of a battery of up to twenty 81 mm mortars. The smaller Unic P107 light halftrack was reinforced with armour and used primarily as a troop carrier in substitute for the Sd.Kfz. 251.

Early in 1943 the Baustab Becker was visited by Albert Speer, and the Matford factory was reviewed by Speer, with General Feuchtinger and Major Becker. Film taken at this time documents the visit and shows many of the conversions completed at the site. A notation in the film states the film was taken so that Hitler could see what was being done there. Over the course of 1943 a number of other high ranking German officers visited Baukommando Becker, including Erich Marcks, Gerd von Rundstedt, and Heinz Guderian.

On 15 March 1943 Major Becker's unit, the gepanzerte Artillerie Brigade of Schnelle Brigade West, participated in a memorial to the men of 15 Batterie Artillerie Regiment 227 killed in action during the Leningrad siege of 1941-42. Becker and his officers laid wreaths in their memory.

=== Schnelle Division West ===
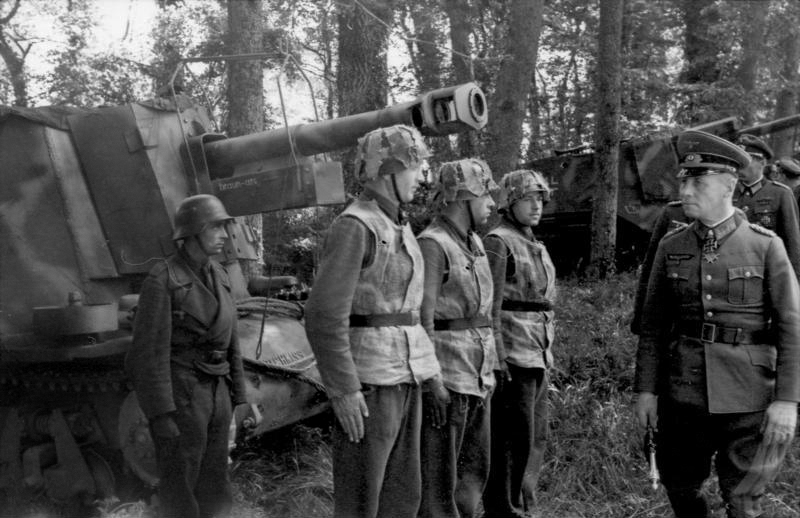
Assault gun battalion troops stand before their 10.5 cm leFH18(Sf) auf Geschützwagen 39H(f) during review, May 1944

Edgar Feuchtinger was appointed commander of a forming unit called Schnelle Division West (Fast Division West). The schnelle divisions were conceived as highly mobile units that would be stationed in France to serve as a rapid response force. Being highly motorized, they were to be able to cover a great deal of ground to reach any point of invasion. The schnelle divisions were to be more completely motorized than a panzer division. (Note: Feuchtinger had organized the annual Nazi party rallies in Nuremberg during the 1930s, and held his command for political reasons. He had commanded Becker's 227th Artillery Regiment on the Eastern Front in 1942 but had no experience in leading armored units prior to assuming command of the 21st Panzer.)

By 1943 German industry was hard pressed to produce the arms and vehicles needed to replace losses on the Eastern Front. Vehicles were in short supply, and as OKH was well aware of the production out of Baustab Becker, they made the unusual requirement that the reforming 21st Panzer Division not make a request for any equipment or vehicles. The OKH instruction issued 27 June 1943, read: "Equipment and vehicles are not allotted. It is expressly forbidden to requisition material for 21. Panzer Division in any way. The necessary equipment and motor vehicles are to be secured exclusively from captured French vehicles or from OB West." Feuchtinger turned to Becker, whom he had known from early in the war, to generate the equipment needed to motorize his unit. The brigade was equipped with captured French built tanks, which were under-gunned by 1943 standards. Becker produced a great many vehicles for Schnelle Brigade West, soon to be expanded into a division. In the summer of 1943 Feuchtinger gave Becker command of the Sturmgeschütz Abteilung 200, a part of his rebuilding 21st Panzer Division. Sturmgeschütz Abteilung 200 formed from the Panzer Artillerie Abteilung West with four batteries. Becker's unit was equipped with his conversion assault guns. In addition, he had two batteries of 88 mm guns under his command. Becker produced a great number of half-tracks making use of captured and refurbished French vehicles. These he armoured. He produced enough of these to motorize one of the two infantry regiments of the 21st Division. To provide the division with mobile firepower he also mounted rockets, mortars and even 7.5 cm Pak 40 guns on these armoured half-tracks. The majority of this work was completed at Baustocommando Becker.

In early 1944, Becker's combat unit, Sturmgeschütz Abteilung 200, moved to its new deployment area near Mauron in Brittany. The unit's headquarters were in the town of Voves, south-east of Chartres. Later that spring Erwin Rommel, the new commander of Army Group B moved the 21st Panzer Division up towards the Normandy coast near Caen. Rommel visited the Normandy defenses twice in May, and reviewed the various mobile gun platforms that had been created. By this time Becker had built his assault gun battalion up to five batteries, but the crews were still green in the use of the vehicles. By combining the 7.5 cm anti-tank guns with the 10.5 cm howitzers, he had formed a new type of fire support unit. He recorded in his archive his assessment of the unit's effectiveness in Normandy:

The self-propelled armoured gun group was a trial unit with the purpose of obtaining a concentrated fire effect whilst in action. Each battery was furnished with six 7.5 cm guns. The front shields were 40 mm thick. Furthermore, four 10.5 cm guns were attached to each battery. These guns were constructed for direct fire, but were capable of firing indirectly. So the 10.5 cm guns were positioned some 500 to 1,000 meters behind the 7.5 cm anti-tank guns.

From advanced positions the commander of the battery was able to direct the action of every gun from his scout vehicle by means of wireless transmission. The fire effect was very high grade, mainly because wireless sets of the latest design were available. These sets enabled us to escape enemy targeting by using very low frequency and relaying through many tanks.

=== Battle of Normandy ===
In the Battle for Normandy the 21st Panzer Division was the only mechanized unit near the area of the invasion, and was the only one with an opportunity to realize Rommel's intentions and meet the invaders at the beach. A number of problems in command and control resulted in the division failing to go into action on the night of 5/6 June when the area was inundated with British paratroopers from the 6th Airborne Division. Becker's assault gun unit did not take part in the first day's fighting, but by 9 June three of his batteries were providing fire support for the 125th Panzergrenadier Regiment. Both the 105 mm howitzers and the 75 mm Pak 40s were effective anti-tank weapons. Allied troops commonly mistook the 7.5 cm PaK40/1 auf Geschuetzwagen Lorraine Schleppers to be armed with 88s.

==== Operation Goodwood ====
Following six weeks of combat with limited gains, General Bernard Montgomery ordered Operation Goodwood to try and break the Normandy stalemate. It is this engagement that Becker and his command are most famous for. In Operation Goodwood, Montgomery committed three armoured divisions in a narrow attack intended to pressure and degrade the German defenders and potentially break out into the open tank country just beyond at Falaise. The route of the attack would take the British armour through positions held by primarily by the 21st Panzer Division's 125th Panzergrenadier Regiment, under command of Hans von Luck. His command had been supplemented by a battalion of Panzer Mk IV tanks from the 22nd Panzer Regiment, a battalion of Tiger tanks from the 503 Heavy Panzer Battalion, and Becker's StuG 200. The Germans termed such an amalgamation a Kampfgruppe ("battle group") and used them throughout the war. Kampfgruppen were usually named after their commanders, in this case "Kampfgruppe Luck". The area of defense was farmland, interrupted by a scattering of small farm villages. The Germans anticipated an attack through this sector, and had prepared a defense in depth to check such an attack. Taking advantage of the stone walls of the old Norman buildings, the villages had been developed into strongpoints. The range of the German anti-tank guns allowed overlapping fields of fire. Though the land was considered good tank country, the German defenders did not make use of mines as they felt that would interfere with their plans of fighting a mobile defense. The area prepared, however, extended back to a depth of 12 kilometers. The defensive positions had been reviewed by Rommel on 15 July and he was reported to be satisfied.

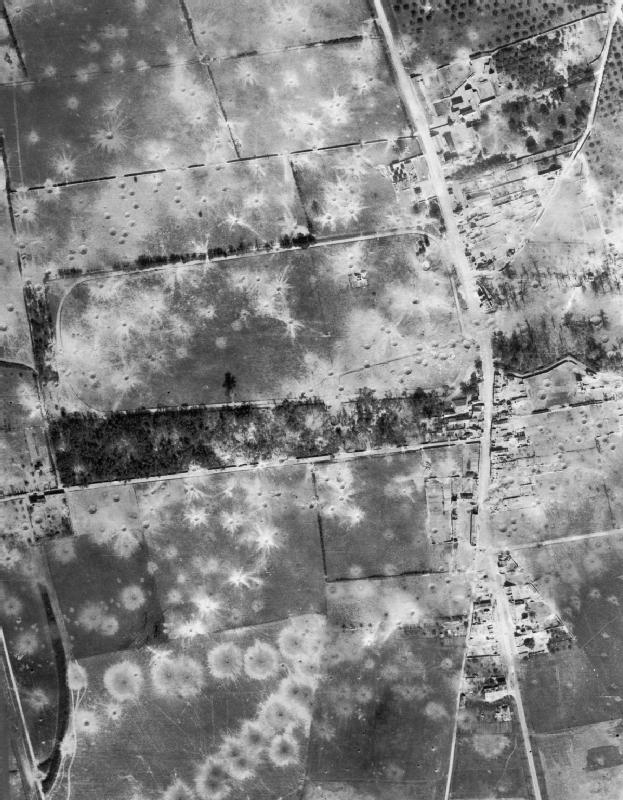
Cagny on 18 July following the Allied bombing raids.

Though engaged in battle over the previous six weeks, Becker's self-propelled assault gun battalion was still intact. It held defensive positions behind the remnants of the 16th Luftwaffe Field Division south and east of Caen. Becker's assault gun battalion was made up of five batteries each equipped with six 7.5 cm Pak 40/1 and four 10.5 cm leFH18. The batteries were situated in concealed positions in the small farm villages, with his 1st Battery in Démouville, the 2nd Battery in Giberville, 3rd Battery in Grentheville, 4th Battery in Le Mesnil Frementel, and the 5th Battery in Le Prieuré. In the event of a British attack Luck intended his Kampfgruppe to fight a mobile defensive battle, with a limited number of men tied to position defenses. Becker's battalion was a key element in the defense. The battle that unfolded proved to be the most important of his career.

In the early morning hours of 18 July the entire defensive position came under an exceptionally heavy bombardment. For nearly two hours, the most concentrated aerial bombardment of the war was delivered, with over 2,000 Allied heavy and medium bombers dropping high explosives over the avenue of the planned attack. This was followed by a naval and artillery bombardment that lasted for another 30 minutes. When it was all over the air was still and filled with floating particles of dirt. Luck had been away in Paris on a three-day leave. When he returned to his command post in Frénouville at 0900, he found the area to be strangely quiet and the air clouded with dust. From his aide he learned of the heavy bombing and attempted to contact his command, but all the communication lines had been cut and no one was answering the wireless. Mounting a Panzer IV he moved slowly forward toward Le Mesnil Frementel. Reaching Cagney he found the village largely destroyed. Reconnoitering along the western edge he saw 50 to 60 tanks of the 11th Armoured Division across the cornfield moving past to the south. These leading tanks were moving toward their first objective: the villages of Bras and Hubert Folie at the base of the Bourguébus ridge. Luck had nothing to check their advance, but as he pulled back he discovered a battery of four Luftwaffe 8.8 cm flak guns in an orchard just outside of Cagney. The anti-aircraft battery was under Luftwaffe control, but Luck commandeered them, had them moved to the northwest edge of Cagny and instructed them to fire upon the second group of advancing tanks. Promising to send his command staff infantry squad to screen them, he returned to Frénouville to try to piece together something to create a blocking position. Said Luck: "The main anti-tank defense units we had was the self-propelled assault gun battalion 200 commanded by one Major Becker."

Becker arrived at Luck's command post in Frénouville and reported he had established radio contact with all of his battery commanders. Becker's unit communicated using a low frequency radio that had limited range but prevented the detection of the signal of origin by the Allies. The short range signals had to be passed through the battalion by relay. The commander of the battery in Démouville reported that all ten of the self-propelled guns of his 1st Battery had been destroyed in the bombardment. The 2nd Battery at Giberville reported suffering damage but was still operational, while the 3rd, 4th and 5th Batteries were undamaged.

Directing his unit from von Luck's command post, Becker fought his batteries using ambush tactics and a mobile defense. The leading elements of the 11th Armoured Division were approaching their objective of Bourguébus and Hubert Folie when they were hit by the self-propelled guns of Becker's Stug 200 firing from Grentheville, Le Mesnil Frementel and Le Prieuré. Becker's vehicles were well hidden and camouflaged. Firing into the flank of the advancing British armour, they caused considerable damage. Major Bill Close, the commander of A Squadron, noted: "In the cornfield around us were many mortar positions which were firing over our heads. They were dealt with quickly, in some cases by simply running over them with the tank. But the self-propelled anti-tank guns of Major Becker's were a different matter. Opening fire from concealed positions at almost point blank range, they hit three of my tanks out of the 19 in action, and they burst into flames. I could see a squadron from 3rd Royal Tank Regiment to my left also had several tanks burning."

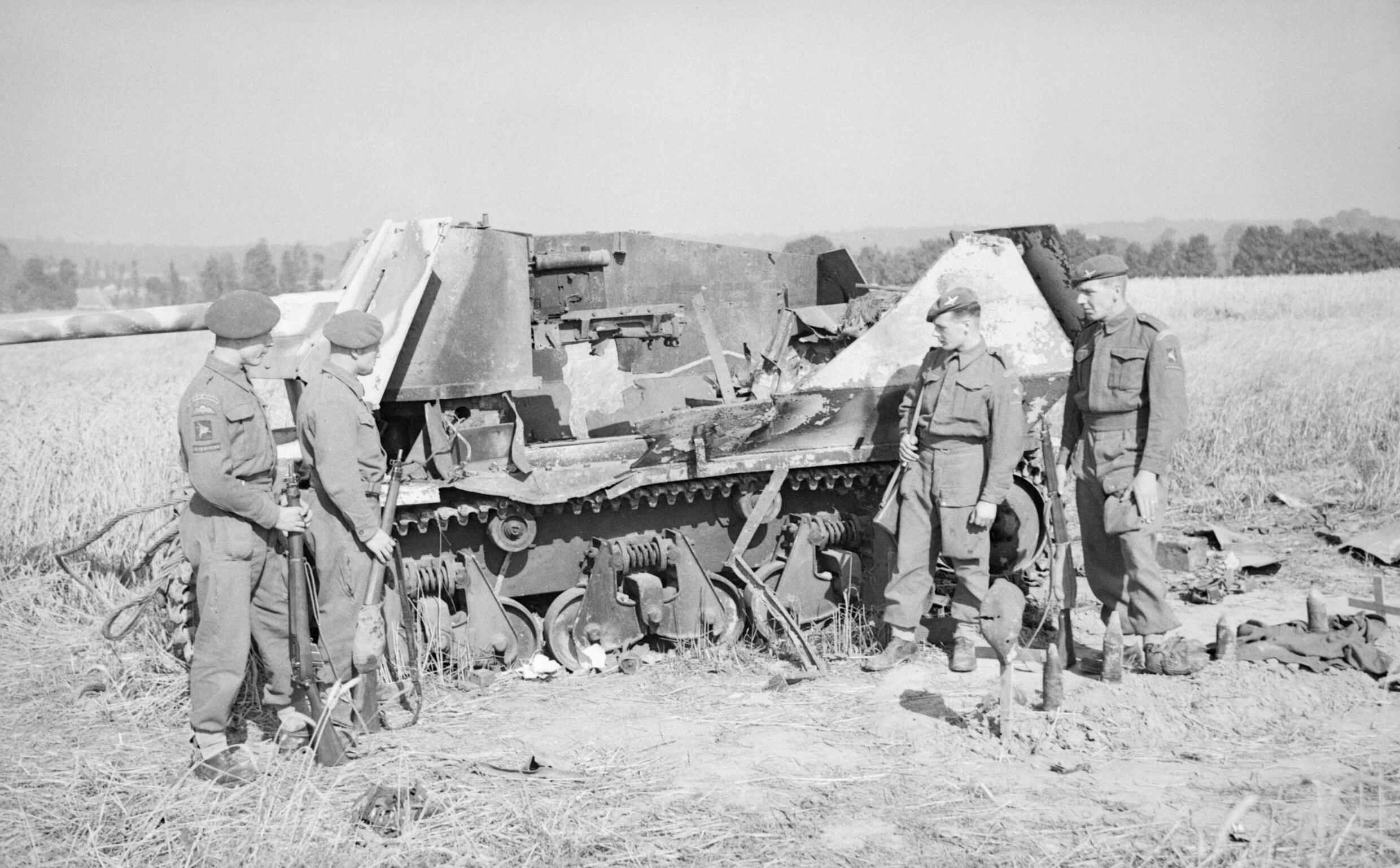
Men of the 6th Airborne Division investigate a destroyed 7.5 cm PaK40/1 auf Geschützwagen 39H(f)

Before the capture of Le Prieuré Major Becker withdrew the 5th Battery back to Le Poirier, while he moved the 4th Battery from Le Mesnil Frementel to the southeast of Four. Becker moved the 2nd Battery from Giberville back to Hubert-Folie, while he kept the 3rd Battery in Grentheville. Following the 23rd Hussars, the 2nd Fife and Forfar Yeomanry were hit while crossing the cornfields to the east and suffered similar damage. With Becker's anti-tank battalion and the Luftwaffe guns at Cagney, Luck was able to check the British advance long enough to allow reinforcements to come up. By mid-afternoon the attack had lost its impetus. The leading British division in the assault, the 11th Armoured Division, had lost 126 tanks by the end of the first day, with the 3rd Royal Tank Regiment losing 41 tanks, the 2nd Fife and Forfar losing 43, the 23rd Hussars losing 26 and the Northamptonshire Yeomanry reporting 16 tanks lost. The crisis for the defenders had passed

The following day the British 11th Armoured Division was largely withdrawn and the fighting was pressed forward with the Guards Armoured Division and the 7th Armoured Division. On the German side the fight was dominated by the 1st SS Panzer and the 12th SS Panzer divisions, reinforcements that had been drawn in to the battle. Operation Goodwood ended having engaged and degraded the German armour, but well short of the threatened breakout.

The last major engagement of Becker's unit was Operation Bluecoat, another British offensive drive where Becker's weakened unit was committed to slow the progression of the 11th Armoured Division south of Saint-Martin-des-Besaces. On 1 August 1944 while in Le Tourneur Becker was injured in the left thigh by shrapnel from an artillery round. Those assault guns of Becker's battalion that survived this engagement were destroyed in the Falaise Gap. Becker and some of his men managed to escape the encirclement and retreated across northern France and into Belgium.

=== Retreat across France, capture, and post-war life ===
As the remnants of the 21st Panzer Division retreated across the Seine and back to the frontier, Becker reached Belgium on 22 August and set up his battalion headquarters in Fosses-la-Ville, castle of Taravisée. On 2 July 1944 Major Becker had been recommended for the award of the Ritterkreuzes zum Kriegsdienstkreuz mit Schwerter, or the Knight's Cross of the War Service Cross with Swords. It was awarded to him at the end of 1944. Major Becker fled from Fosses-la-Ville on 3 September at 4PM, just before being arrested by the local resistance (Secret Army) who arrived too late at 8PM in Taravisée. After reaching the Rhineland, Becker was captured in late December 1944 in Alsace. He survived the war and in 1947 married a French woman he had met in Normandy while recovering from wounds. He restarted a machining business in Düsseldorf, the Alfred Becker Gesellschaft mit beschränkter Haftung, which initially produced machines for the textile industry. The business continues to this day, and is managed by a Thomas Becker. Alfred Becker died on 26 December 1981.

== Summary ==
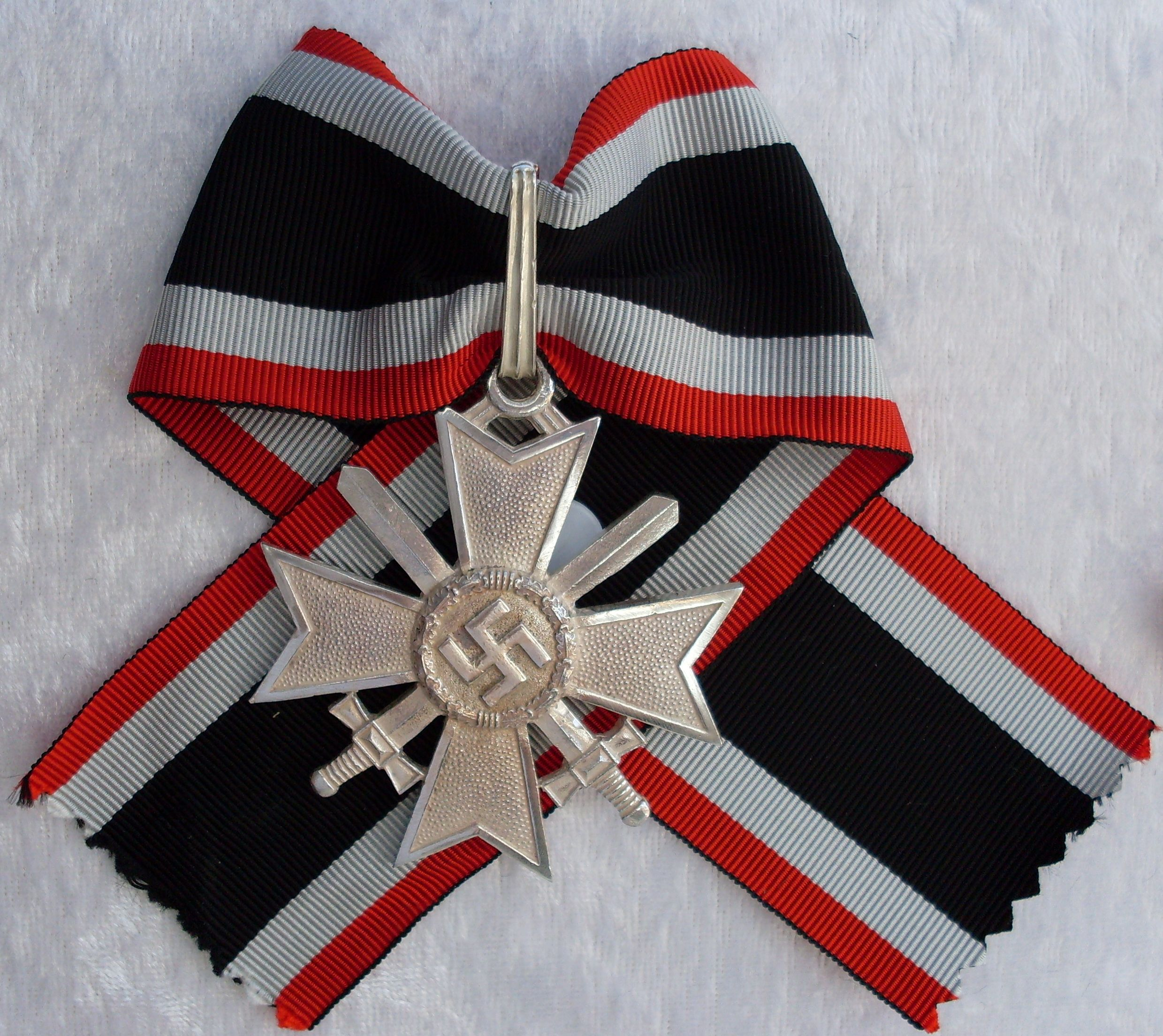
Knights Cross of the War Merit Cross with Swords

Major Becker was an industrialist and engineer with a knack for mechanical inventiveness. He demonstrated a remarkable talent for improvisation in building useful self-propelled guns and reconnaissance vehicles from wrecks and obsolete captured equipment. The great numbers of trucks and half-tracks Becker was able to refurbish provided much needed transport to the German army. Many of the mobilized guns and armoured half-tracked vehicles were used to equip the reconstituted 21st Panzer Division, providing the division with a mobility and capability it otherwise would not have had. The self-propelled assault guns of his Sturmgeschütz Abteilung 200 proved very effective when handled as ambush weapons, as was demonstrated at Operation Goodwood and Operation Bluecoat.

Becker kept detailed records. These included notes on his designs and photographs of his projects in various stages of completion. Films were also made at his workshops and practice grounds for review by Adolf Hitler. His extensive archive was used by the British Ministry of Defence for their 1979 battlefield training film Operation Goodwood. Ten years later Walter Spielberger made extensive use of Becker's records and photographic images in his 1989 book Beute-Kraftfahrzeuge und Panzer der Deutschen Wehrmacht (Captured Halftracks and Tanks of the German Military). To this day, wargamers and scale modellers continue to be fascinated by the many unusual and effective vehicles that Becker designed.

Becker's importance to the German war effort during the Second World War underscores the fact that by 1943 German industry lacked the productive capacity to keep up with the massive losses in equipment they were suffering in the east.

== Military awards ==
- Iron Cross (1914), 2nd and 1st Class
- Clasp to the Iron Cross (1939)
  - 1939 Bar to the 1914 Iron Cross 2nd Class (18 May 1940)
  - 1939 Bar to the 1914 Iron Cross 1st Class (3 June 1940)
- German Cross in Gold (Deutsches Kreuz in Gold als Oberleutnant und Chef 15. (Stu.Gesch.) / Artillerie-Regiment 227) (13 May 1942)
- War Merit Cross 1st class with Swords (Kriegsverdienstkreuz 1.Klasse mit Schwertern) (1 September 1942)
- Knight's Cross of the War Merit Cross with Swords (Ritterkreuz des Kriegsverdienstkreuzes mit Schwertern) (either December 1944 or 20 April 1945)

== Becker conversions ==
=== Fully tracked armoured fighting vehicles ===
Conversions based on the FCM 36 medium tank

- 7.5 cm Pak 40 (Sf.) auf Geschützwagen FCM 36 (f) (10 built)

A 7.5 cm Pak 40 L/46 mounted on the chassis of the FCM 36, with steel plates formed to create a protected crew compartment. Also referred to as the Marder I.

- 10.5 cm leFH 16/1 (Sf.) auf Geschützwagen FCM 36 (f) (12 built)

A 10.5 cm leFH 16 field howitzer mounted on the chassis of the FCM 36, with steel plates formed to create a protected crew compartment. It is similar to the Sd.Kfz. 124 "Wespe".

Conversions based on the Hotchkiss H35/H38/H39 cavalry tank

- 7,5 cm PaK 40 (Sf.) auf Geschützwagen 39H (f) (60 built)

A 7.5 cm Pak 40 L/46 mounted on the chassis of the Hotchkiss H 39, with steel plates formed to create a protected crew compartment. Also referred to as the Marder I.

- 10.5 cm leFH 16 (Sf.) auf Geschützwagen 39H (f) (12 built)

A 10.5 cm leFH 16 howitzer mounted on the chassis of the Hotchkiss H 39, with steel plates cut and welded to form a protected crew compartment. It is similar to the Sd.Kfz. 124 "Wespe".

- 10.5 cm leFH 18 (Sf.) auf Geschützwagen 39H (f) (48 built)

A 10.5 cm leFH 18 howitzer mounted on the chassis of the Hotchkiss H 39, with steel plates cut and welded to form a protected crew compartment. It is similar to the Sd.Kfz. 124 "Wespe".

- Artillerieschlepper 38H (f)

The Hotchkiss H 38 simplified to a tractor to pull a field gun.

- großer Funk-und Beobachtungspanzer 38H(f) (30 built)

A command and artillery observation vehicle based on the Hotchkiss H 38.

- Panzerkampfwagen 35H (f) mit 28/32 cm Wurfrahmen

The standard Hotchkiss H 35 with its issue small turret, supplemented with four to six 28 or 32 cm rockets mounted in their crates to the sides of the tank.

Conversions based on the Renault AMR 35/Renault ZT light cavalry tank

- 8 cm Schwerer Granatwerfer 34 auf Panzerspähwagen AMR 35(f) / 8 cm Schwerer Granatwerfer 34 auf Panzerspähwagen ZT 702(f)

A small mortar carrier with a 8 cm Granatwerfer 34 mortar built on the AMR 35 chassis, with steel plates formed to create a protected crew compartment.

Conversions based on the British Mk VI light tank

- 7.5 cm PaK 40 auf Geschützwagen Mk.VI 736(e) (1 incomplete prototype)

A 7.5 cm Pak 40 mounted onto the chassis of the British Mk VI Light Tank, with steel plates cut and welded to form a protected crew compartment. It is similar to the Marder I.

- 10.5 cm LeFH 16 auf Geschützwagen Mk.VI 736(e) (12 built)

A German 10.5 cm leFH 16 field howitzer mounted onto the chassis of the British Mk VI Light Tank, with steel plates cut and welded to form a protected crew compartment. It is similar to the Sd.Kfz. 124 "Wespe".

=== Fully tracked armoured carriers ===
Conversions based on the Lorraine 37L light tractor

- 7.5 cm PaK 40/1 (Sf.) auf Geschützwagen Lorraine Schlepper (f) (280 built)

The Marder I (Sd.Kfz. 135), a 7.5 cm Pak 40 L/46 mounted on the chassis of the Lorraine Schlepper (f) chassis, with steel plates formed to create a protected crew compartment.

- 10.5 cm leFH 18 (Sf.) auf Geschützwagen Lorraine Schlepper (f) (60 built)

A 10.5 cm leFH 18 howitzer mounted on the chassis of the Lorraine Schlepper (f) chassis, with steel plates formed to create a protected crew compartment. It is similar to the Sd.Kfz. 124 "Wespe".

- 12.2 cm FK(r) auf Geschützwagen Lorraine Schlepper (f) (one built)

A 12.2 cm s.F.H.396(r) (Captured Soviet 122 mm M-30 howitzer) on the Lorraine Schlepper (f) chassis, with steel plates formed to create a protected crew compartment.

- 15 cm sFH13/1 (Sf.) auf Geschützwagen Lorraine Schlepper (f) (72 built)

Official German designation Sd.Kfz. 135/1. A 15 cm sFH 13 howitzer mounted on the chassis of the Lorraine Schlepper (f) chassis, with steel plates formed to create a protected crew compartment. It is similar to the Grille Ausf. K.

- Gefechtsfeld-Versorgungsfahrzeug Lorraine 37L (f)

An battlefield armoured munitions carrier.

- großer Funk-und Befehlspanzer auf Lorraine Schlepper (f) (24 built)

An artillery command vehicle using the Lorraine Schlepper (f) chassis.

- großer Funk-und Beobachtungswagen auf Lorraine (f) (30 built)

An artillery observation vehicle using the Lorraine Schlepper(f) chassis.

- Munitionstransportkraftwagen auf Lorraine Schlepper (f)

An armoured munitions carrier.

Conversions based on the Renault UE light mover

- Kleiner Funk- und Beobachtungspanzer auf Infanterie-Schlepper UE (f) (40 built)

A small command and artillery observation vehicle built on the chassis of the Renault UE.

Conversions based on the Universal Carrier light mover

- 4,7 cm Pak 35/36 L/35.6 (ö) “Böhler” auf Sfl. Bren 731(e)

A small tank destroyer based on the Universal Carrier mounting a 4,7 cm Pak 35/36 L/35.6 (ö) “Böhler” (a Cannone da 47/32 with a L/35.6 barrel, pepper box style muzzle brake and had a slightly greater performance).

=== Halftrack vehicles ===
Conversions to armoured troop or weapons carriers based on the SOMUA MCL halftracks

- Zgkw. S303(f)

The SOMUA MCL light-halftrack, an unarmoured and essentially unmodified softskin vehicle.

- m.SPW S303(f)

An armoured personnel carrier halftrack based on the SOMUA MCL. Equivalent of the Sd.Kfz. 251/1.

- 8 cm Raketen Vielfachwerfer auf m.Gep.Zgkw. SOMUA S303(f) (6 built)

A 8 cm Raketen-Vielfachwerfer multiple rocket launcher, mounted on the SOMUA MCL. The rocket launcher consisted of 8 cm rockets mounted on rails, with two racks of twelve rails for total of twenty four 80 mm rocket rounds per load. The rockets are similar to the 'Stalin's Organ' Katyusha rockets.

- 8 cm Reihenwerfer auf m.Gep.Zgkw. SOMUA S303(f) (16 built)

20 tubes of 8.14 cm GrW 278/1(f) mortars (Captured 81 mm French Brandt Mle 27/31 mortars) set on two tiers and mounted on the back of the armored SOMUA MCL.

Conversions to armoured troop or weapons carriers based on the SOMUA MCG halftracks

- Zugkraftwagen S307(f)

The SOMUA MCG halftrack modified with armour plate covering to the front over the radiator and to the windscreen, short armoured bed, otherwise a softskin half-track.

- m.SPW S307(f) auf SOMUA MCG

An armoured personnel carrier halftrack based on the SOMUA MCG. Equivalent of the Sd.Kfz. 251/1.

- Pionier Panzerwagen auf m.SPW S307(f)

An armoured personnel carrier halftrack based on the SOMUA MCG. Equivalent of the Sd.Kfz. 251/7 Pionierpanzerwagen: an assault engineer vehicle with special tools, explosives and fittings to carry assault bridge ramps on the sides.

- Munitions Zugkrafwagen auf m.SPW S307(f)

An armoured munitions carrier based on the SOMUA MCG. Similar to the Sd.Kfz. 250/6 leichter Munitionspanzerwagen.

- Panzerjäger-Fahrzeuge mit 7.5cm PaK 40 auf Fahrgestell S307(f) (72 built)

An armoured SOMUA MCG half-track mounting a 7.5 cm PaK 40 L/46. This vehicle preceded development of the Sd.Kfz. 251/22 by a year.

- 8 cm Reihenwerfer auf m.Gep.Zgkw. SOMUA S307(f) (36 built)

16 tubes of 8.14 cm GrW 278/1(f) mortars (Captured 81 mm French Brandt Mle 27/31 mortars) set on two tiers and mounted on the back of SOMUA MCG.

Conversions to armoured personnel or weapons carriers based on the Unic P107 Halftrack

- Zgkw. U304(f)

A softskin half-track transport based on the Unic P107 halftrack.

- le.SPW U304(f)

An armoured version of the P107 halftrack, a lighter version of the Sd.Kfz. 251/1 armoured personnel carrier.

- le.SPW U304(f) (Funk)

An equivalent of the Sd.Kfz. 251/3 or 251/8 radio/command vehicles.

- Sfl. für 2 cm FlaK 38 (teilgepanzert) auf Unic P107 U304(f) (18 built)

A 2 cm FlaK 38 single mount on the Unic P107 with an armored rear area and an unarmored cabin. Built as an emergency reconstruction. Similar to the Sd.Kfz. 11/1.

- le.Sfl. für 2 cm FlaK 38 (gepanzert) auf Unic P107 U304(f) (72 built)

A 2 cm FlaK 38 single mount on the armoured Unic P107 (similar to the Sd.Kfz. 11/1).

- 3.7 cm PaK 36 auf le.SPW U304(f)

A 3.7 cm PaK 36 mounted on the armoured Unic P107 (similar to the Sd.Kfz. 251/10, but built by Becker about a year before).

- 8 cm GrW auf le.SPW U304(f)

A 8.14 cm GrW 278/1(f) mortars (Captured 81 mm French Brandt Mle 27/31 mortars) mounted inside the armoured Unic P107 (similar to the Sd.Kfz. 251/2 Schützenpanzerwagen (Granatwerfer)).

=== Other conversions ===
- Mannschaftstransportpanzer Halbkette (120 built)

A Panzer recovery half-track.

- Munitions-Lastkraftwagen mit Anhänger (48 built)

An ammunition truck.

- Werkstatt-Lastkraftwagen (28 built)

A repair vehicle.

- Treibstoff-Lastkraftwagen (64 built)

A fuel truck.

- Arzt-Personenkraftwagen (12 built)

A physician vehicle.

- Krankenkraftwagen (48 built)

An ambulance vehicle.

- Sanitäts-Lastkraftwagen (12 built)

A medical service vehicle.

- Operationswagen (6 built)

A mobile surgical suite vehicle based on the Isobloc Typ W 843 bus.

- Mannschaftstransportwagen (60 built)

An armoured personnel carrier.

- Küchenwagen (32 built)

A baker's truck.

- Befehlswagen (40 built)

A command vehicle.

- Funkwagen (24 built)

A radio vehicle.

- Fernsprechwagen (24 built)

A telephone line vehicle.

- Tross-Lastkraftwagen 3 ton (120 built)

A three ton heavy supply truck.

- Tross-Lastkraftwagen 3 ton geländegängig (24 built)

A three ton heavy supply truck (off road).

- Tross-Anhänger 3 ton (40 built)

A three ton supply truck.

- Krafträder, solo (72 built)

A motorcycle.

- Krafträder und Beiwagen (24 built)

A motorcycle and sidecar.

Note: production details as per Spielberger.

== Gallery ==
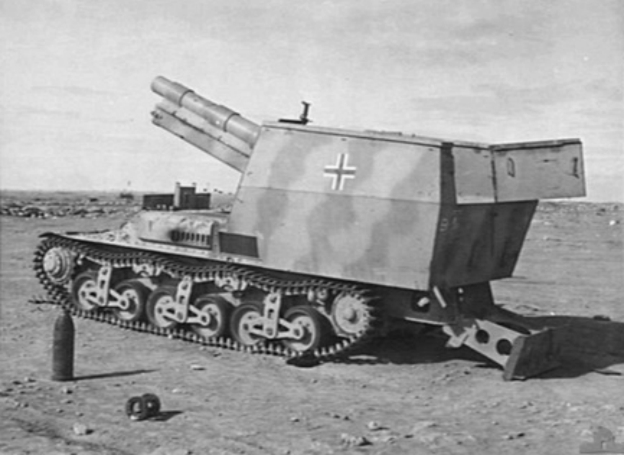
Abandoned Sd.Kfz. 135/1 with recoil brake extended, Libya 1943

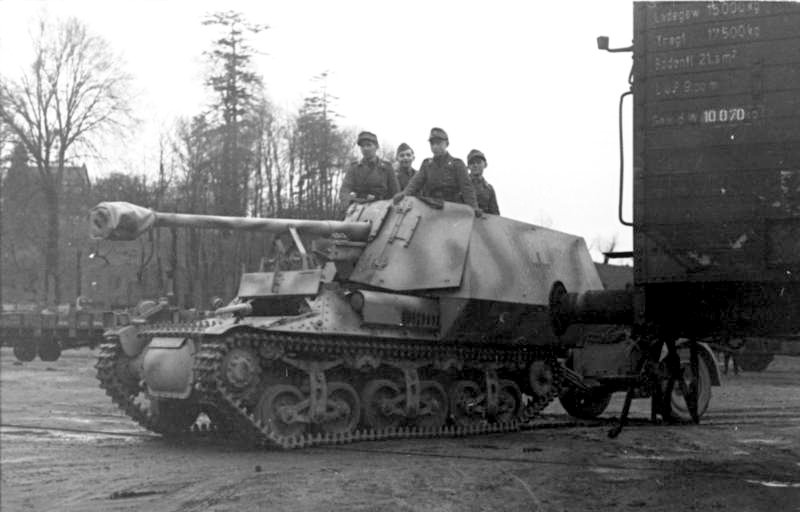
The Marder I had little room for storage, and carried about 40 rounds

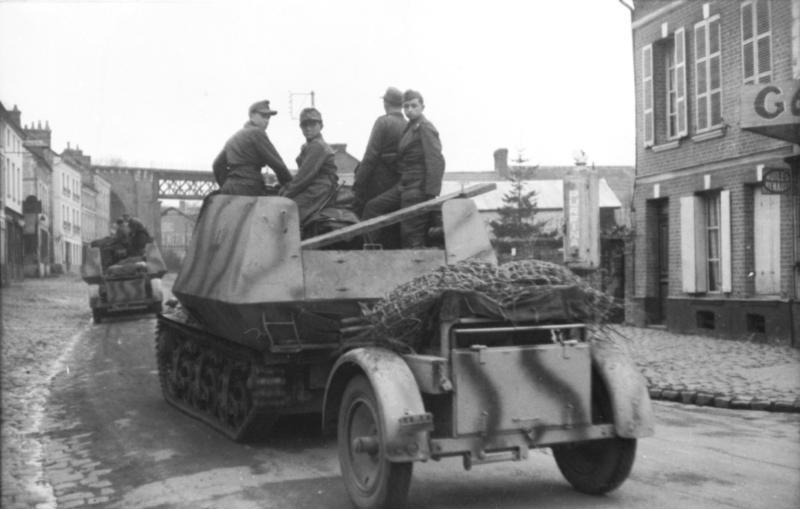
An ammunition trailer was produced for the Marder I

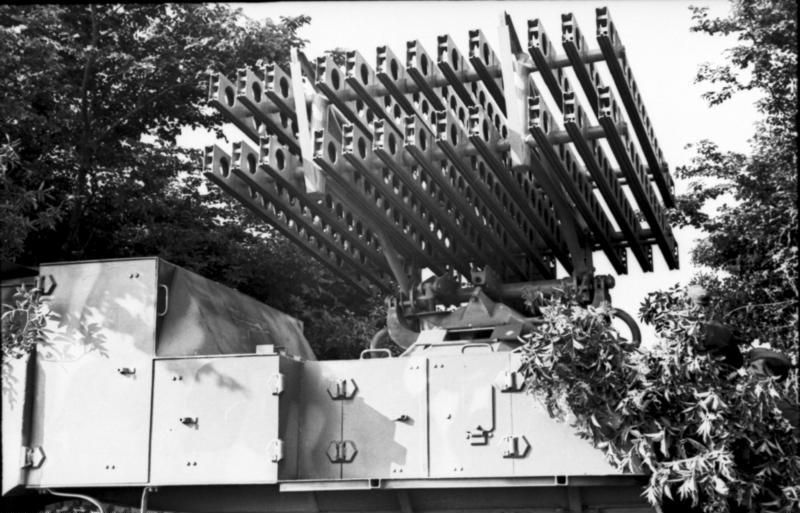
8-cm-Vielfachwerfer, a double rail launcher that fires twenty Katyusha-like rockets mounted on an armoured SOMUA MCG halftracked vehicle

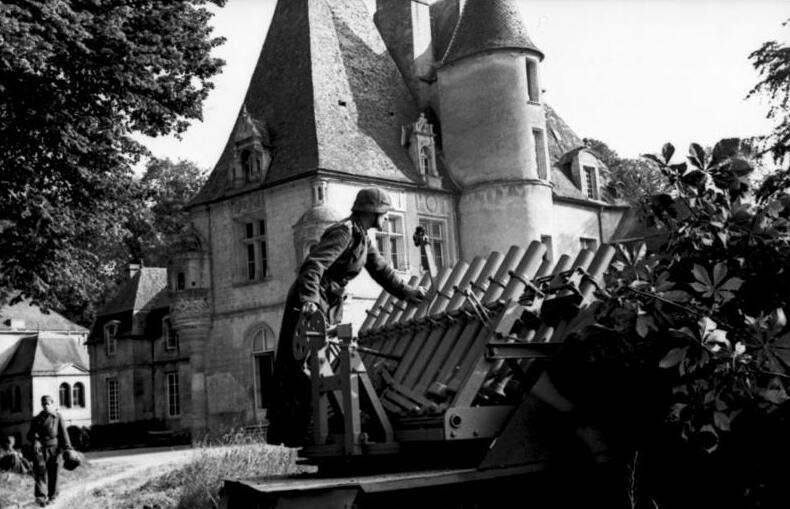
Reihenwerfer mounted on an armoured SOMUA MCG halftracked vehicle

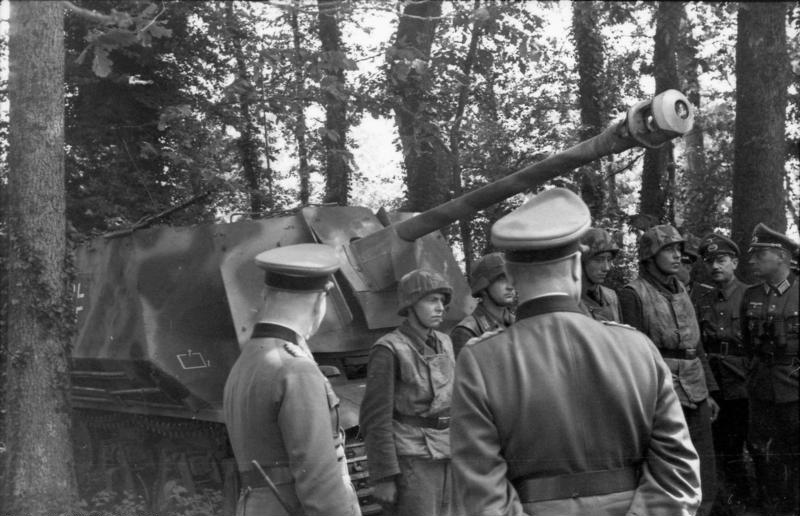
Hotchkiss H39 based GW H39 7.5 cm Pak 40 under review, May 1944
