= Reihenwerfer =

Mittlerer Schützenpanzerwagen S303(f) mit Reihenwerfer
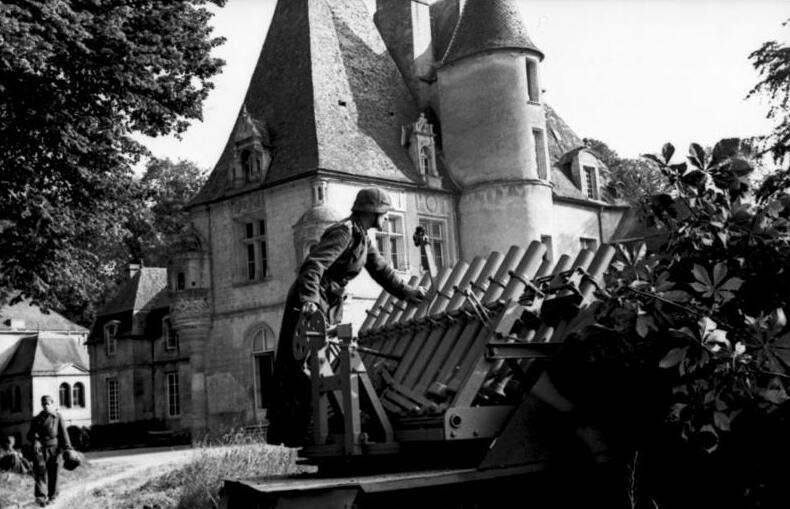
- A Reihenwerfer near Riva-Bella (close to Sword Beach), Northern France on 30 May 1944. (Note: The description for both photos mistakenly identify the Reihenwerfer as a 8 cm Raketen-Vielfachwerfer.)
- Type: Barrage Mortar
- Place of origin: Nazi Germany

Service history
- Used by: Nazi Germany
- Wars: Second World War

Production history
- Designer: Alfred Becker
- Manufacturer: Alfred Becker

Specifications
- Mass: 7,118 kg (15,693 lb)
- Length: 5.3 m (17 ft 5 in)
- Barrel length: 1.26 m (4 ft 2 in) L/15.6
- Width: 2.17 m (7 ft 1 in)
- Height: 2.85 m (9 ft 4 in)
- Shell weight: Light: 3.25 kg (7 lb 3 oz); Heavy: 6.5 kg (14 lb 5 oz)
- Caliber: 81 mm (3.2 in)
- Barrels: 20
- Elevation: +35° to +90°
- Traverse: 360°
- Muzzle velocity: 174 m/s (570 ft/s)
- Maximum firing range: Light: 2.8 km (1.7 mi); Heavy: 1.2 km (0.75 mi)
- Armor: 12 mm (0.47 in)
- Main armament: 20 x 81 mm GrW 278(f) mortars with 90 rounds of ammunition
- Secondary armament: MG34 or MG42
- Engine: 4-cylinder, petrol, 4712 cc 60 hp (45 kW)
- Transmission: 5 forward and 1 reverse gears
- Suspension: Half-track
- Fuel capacity: 80 L (18 imp gal)
- Operational range: 180 km (110 mi)
- Maximum speed: 31 km/h (19 mph)

The Reihenwerfer or Mittlerer Schützenpanzerwagen S303(f) mit Reihenwerfer was a self-propelled barrage mortar used by the German armed forces during World War II.

== History ==
After the fall of France in 1940 large amounts of French military hardware fell into German hands. Two systems that were captured in sizable numbers were the SOMUA MCL half-track artillery tractor and the 81 mm Brandt Mle 27/31 mortar. Since the Germans were short of resources both were issued to German units. The SOMUA MCL was given the German designation S303(f) and the mle 27/31 was given the designation GrW 278(f). (Note: The "f" indicating of French origin)

The Reihenwerfer consisted of 20 GrW 278(f) barrels in two rows of ten which were mounted on a common framework that was attached to a base mounted on the back of an armored S303(f) chassis. The mortars and half-tracks were converted by Major Alfred Becker's workshop (Baukommando Becker) in Paris. All 20 barrels could be traversed 360° and elevated together from +35° to +90°, with the outer barrels pointing slightly outwards to increase the spread of the barrage. The vehicle carried 90 rounds of ready use ammunition and each barrel held a single round at the top of the tube until fired by pulling a lanyard. The round then slid down the tube until it hit a firing pin which launched it. In action, all 20 barrels were fired in rapid succession, but not simultaneously to saturate the target area. The Reihenwerfer was deployed by German units in Northern France during the Normandy landings.

== Gallery ==
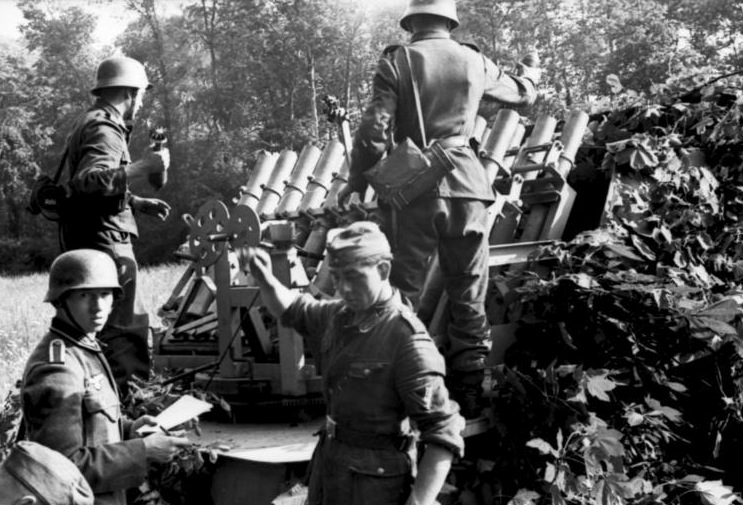
A crew loading a Reihenwerfer near Riva-Bella on 30 May 1944.
