= 10.5 cm leFH 16 Geschützwagen Mk VI 736 (e) =

German self-propelled artillery piece

10.5cm leFH 16 Geschützwagen Mk VI 736 (e)
- Type: Self-propelled artillery
- Place of origin: Germany

Service history
- In service: 1940–1942
- Used by: Nazi Germany
- Wars: World War II

Production history
- Designer: Alfred Becker
- Designed: 1940
- No. built: 12

Specifications
- Mass: 8,200 kg (18,100 lb)
- Length: 5.38 m (17 ft 8 in)
- Width: 2.0 m (6 ft 7 in)
- Height: 2.26 m (7 ft 5 in)
- Crew: 4
- Armour: 4–14 mm
- Main armament: 10.5 cm leFH 16
- Secondary armament: MG 34
- Engine: Meadows 6-cylinder petrol 88 hp
- Power/weight: 16.9 hp/ton (Mark VIB and VIC)
- Transmission: Wilson pre-selector gearbox
- Suspension: Horstmann inclined springs
- Ground clearance: 10 inches
- Fuel capacity: 30 imperial gallons (140 L; 36 US gal)
- Operational range: 130 miles (210 km)
- Maximum speed: 35 miles per hour (56 km/h) (25 miles per hour (40 km/h) off road)

The 10.5 cm leFH 16 Geschützwagen Mk VI 736 (e) was a German self-propelled artillery piece. It was created by mounting the German 10.5 cm leFH 16 field howitzer onto the chassis of the British Light Tank Mk VI. The vehicle was created by engineer Alfred Becker, who was battery chief of the 12th Battery in the 15th Artillery Regiment, 227th Infantry Division. Becker found abandoned vehicles while his unit was performing coastal protection duties in France. He made use of his artillery crews to build this vehicle and a number of others to motorize his battery. Becker's unit operated the first purpose-built self-propelled artillery of the war. A previous rough-and-ready conversion, the 15 cm sIG 33 (Sf) auf Panzerkampfwagen I Ausf B, had merely put a sIG 33 inside a superstructure, complete with wheeled carriage.

== Construction ==
Following the German victory in France in July 1940, the 227th Infantry Division was assigned occupation, security, and coastal defense duties along the Normandy coast near Le Havre. There, Becker came across British armored vehicles that had been left behind. A mechanical engineer in civilian life, Becker considered the benefits that could be derived in mobility from mounting his artillery guns directly onto the chassis of the abandoned tanks. Becker's unit had been drawn from the Krefeld area. Krefeld was a manufacturing town, and many of the men who had been called up along with Becker were skilled workers in the iron processing industry. Recruiting the men of his battery and working by shift day and night, he set about his project.

The light but reliable British Mark VI Light Tank was selected by Becker for the chassis to mount the 10.5 cm howitzer on. The Mk VI's design made it suitable for use as artillery self-propelled guns, since the engine, transmission, steering assembly and drive wheels were all grouped together in the front of the chassis, leaving the rear of the vehicle available for the gun and the crew.

The superstructure and turret of the tank was removed. He then mounted the 10.5 cm leFH 16 howitzer just aft of the midpoint of the chassis. The location of the gun's mounting allowed the crew the room they needed to work the gun, and the commander was provided a better field of vision. To protect the crew, a metal housing was erected around the rear of the vehicle. Having worked at Deutsche Edelstahlwerke in Krefeld before the war, Becker was able to have them produce the plates he needed to form the shielding for the crew. He measured out the dimensions needed and had the plates manufactured and then shipped out to France. The steel plating ranged in thickness from 11 to 22 mm (0.43 to 0.87 in) The armour was too light to stop heavy shells or armour piercing rounds, but served to protect the crew from small arms fire and shrapnel fragments.

The crew compartment was small. The commander was positioned at the rear of the vehicle on the left. He had access to a range finding periscope which was mounted to the side of the vehicle. The gunner was directly in front of the commander. A gun sight extended above the shielding in front of him. The loader was on the right, and he had access to a tray of rounds stored behind the breech. In front of the loader sat the driver.

The vehicle was open topped. A machine gun could be mounted to the front of the shielding on the right. Though not intended for close combat, the crew had access to their personal weapons as well, which they could fire over the top of the fighting compartment if need be. A tarpaulin could be fitted to the top to give the crew some protection from the weather. To provide stability when firing the relatively heavy gun from a rather light chassis, Becker used a lowered rear spur at rear to absorb the considerable recoil force. This recoil brake was made of a square steel frame reinforced with two cross bars. At the bottom were a pair of V-shaped "spades" which dug into the ground when firing.

The 10.5 cm leFH 16 main gun was a howitzer that had been first used by the German Army in World War I. (Note: leFH stands for the German words leichte FeldHaubitze (" light field howitzer") while 16 refers to the year of its development, 1916) Its maximum firing range was 9,225 m (10,089 yd), with a muzzle velocity of 395 metres per second (1,300 ft/s). The high explosive round was two-part; the high explosive shell would be loaded first followed by the cartridge propellant case. Depending on the range of the target, different sized bags of propellant were inserted into the cartridge.

Though an armour piercing round could be provided to the guns, the relatively low muzzle velocity gave it poor penetrative power. Used for direct-fire against armored vehicles, it could penetrate as much as 52 mm of armor plate at a range of 500 meters.

Over a six-month period Becker's unit succeeded in creating a complete battery, mobilizing twelve of the battalion's 10.5 cm leFH 16 howitzers. He also built six other vehicles mounting the larger 15 cm sFH 13 heavy guns, twelve munitions carrying versions of the Mk.VI, several munitions carrying versions of the Bren gun carrier and four armoured command tank versions of the Mk. VI.

Though awkward, the vehicle designation 10.5 cm LeFH 16 auf Geschützwagen Mk.VI(e) is descriptive. 10.5 cm LeFH 16 is the name of the gun mounted. auf Geschützwagen translates to 'on gun car'. Mk.VI refers to the Mk VI that is the chassis, and the letter 'e' for englisch that the vehicle was originally British manufacture. Some early images of the vehicles show the letters Gp followed by a number on the left side of the armor plate of the vehicle. Gp is an abbreviation for Geschützpanzer which translates as "gun tank" or "self-propelled gun", and the number indicates which one of those vehicles it is.

== Operational history ==
The battery's initial test firing was done at the range at Harfleur near Le Havre, France. The complete battery was tested at the training grounds at Beverloo, Belgium.

The vehicles saw their first use in combat when the 227th Infantry Division was transferred to Army Group North. In September 1941 the division was given orders to transfer from France to the east, and arrived there by rail later that autumn. The division took up positions in the forests south of Lake Ladoga as the German forces took up a defensive posture. The 227th was the only division on the Eastern Front to have a motorized artillery battery. When the 254th Infantry Division was under pressure and required extra artillery support, the 12th battery was temporarily transferred there. The fact that the battery could be moved easily and quickly made Becker's battery soon recognized as a ready, mobile force whose firepower could be quickly brought to bear. The battery was used to provide support to a variety of units through the next two months, however, when called upon to provide direct fire support for an infantry attack the battery suffered its first casualties. Four men, including Captain Becker, were wounded; their vehicles were small and lacked the heavy armour of an assault vehicle.

On 11 November 1941 a platoon of the battery was engaged with Soviet T-40 light tanks of the 2nd Tank Brigade. These light tanks mounted machine guns, but no heavy gun. A German battle report noted one of the self-propelled guns was hit 16 times, but its armor plate was not penetrated. The battery was again ordered to operate as assault guns on 15 November to support an attack of the 223rd Infantry Division. One of the vehicles was heavily damaged after running over a mine and three men were killed. The vehicle had to be left behind, but was recovered three days later.

The battery continued to conduct artillery fire support missions over the winter and spring of 1942. The battery's division, the 227th Infantry Division, continued to be engaged in fighting south of Lake Ladoga around the village of Pogost'ye. On 16 February 1942 the battery encountered KV-1 heavy tanks of the 124th tank battalion of the Soviet 54th Army. The 10.5 cm armour piercing ammunition used by the German gun crews was unable to knock out the KV-1s, and three of the 10.5 cm LeFH 16 auf Geschützwagen Mk.VI(e) self-propelled guns were destroyed.

In March 1942 three vehicles provided close support for troops moving along roads near Pogostyle. Over the next several months the self-propelled guns were gradually lost, most often by mine damage, but one was destroyed by direct fire from a tank of the 98th Tank Brigade. In August 1942 the OKH requested one of the Becker-designed vehicles be withdrawn and shipped to Berlin. On 2 September 1942 Becker and one of his crews presented the vehicle to Adolf Hitler and officers of the Army Ordnance Office in the garden of the Reich Chancellery. Following this meeting, Becker was withdrawn from the Eastern front and sent to France to build conversions using other captured or damaged vehicles.

== Further development ==
Becker had built the first German battery of purpose-built self-propelled artillery. This marked the start of a development that led to the creation of a separate mobilized artillery branch in the German army. This had been envisioned by Heinz Guderian as a component of the panzer division, but, apart from the Sturmpanzer I, such vehicles had not been developed thus far due to limitations in material and the priority on tank production. Subsequently, Germany produced self-propelled guns based on its own armored vehicle chassis, such as the Wespe using the Panzer II light tank and the Hummel based on the Panzer IV medium tank. The mobile artillery battery was a significant contribution to the further development of the panzer force. For his work on mobilizing the artillery pieces Becker was awarded the German Cross in Gold.
