= 8 cm Raketen-Vielfachwerfer =

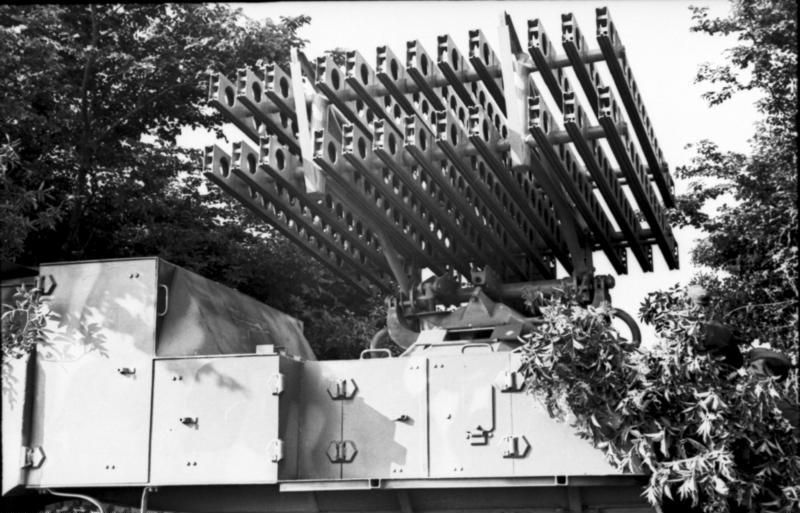
- A SOMUA MCL with an 8 cm Raketen-Vielfachwerfer launcher
- Type: Multiple rocket launcher
- Place of origin: Nazi Germany

Service history
- In service: 1943–1945
- Used by: Nazi Germany
- Wars: World War II

Production history
- Produced: 1943–1945
- No. built: 300
- Variants: 24 or 48 round launcher

Specifications
- Mass: Loaded: 6,853 kg (15,108 lb); Empty: 6,200 kg (13,700 lb)
- Crew: 6
- Shell: .72 m (2 ft 4 in)
- Shell weight: 6.9 kg (15 lb 3 oz)
- Caliber: 78 mm (3.1 in)
- Elevation: 0° to +37°
- Traverse: 360°
- Muzzle velocity: 290 m/s (950 ft/s)
- Maximum firing range: 5.3 km (3.3 mi)
- Filling weight: .6 kg (1 lb 5 oz)

The 8 cm Raketen-Vielfachwerfer was a German rocket launcher of the Second World War. The launcher was a near-copy of the Soviet BM-8 Katyusha rocket launcher produced under the influence of the Waffen SS.

== History ==
The Soviet BM-8 Katyusha rocket launchers first encountered during Operation Barbarossa left a big impression on the invading Germans. Proposals to copy the Katyusha for German use were soon made but there wasn't much spare industrial capacity available for new projects. There also wasn't a great deal of enthusiasm for the project because the German Army had already committed to the production of spin-stabilized rocket systems such as the 15 cm Nebelwerfer 41.

Since the Waffen-SS was the military wing of the Nazi Party it was often in competition with the German armed forces (Wehrmacht) for resources. The Waffen-SS often used its political influence to create its own network of suppliers outside the influence of the Wehrmacht to supply its troops. A product of this competition for resources was the 8 cm Raketen-Vielfachwerfer which was almost a direct copy of the BM-8 and often armed Waffen-SS units.

== Design ==
The launcher consisted of two rows of parallel perforated steel rails which the rockets were mounted on. The launch rails could launch either German or captured Russian rockets. The rails were then mounted on tubular steel frames on a variety of vehicles. Two of the most common mounts were an armored SOMUA MCL (German designation Raketenwerfer S303 (f) auf SOMUA MCL) a French half-track artillery tractor modified by Alfred Becker for use by the Wehrmacht or a German Sd.Kfz. 4 half-track truck.

The rocket - the 8 cm Raketen Sprenggranate - was a simple cordite fueled, fin-stabilized, 78 mm (3.1 in) diameter, high-explosive rocket patterned closely on the Russian M-8. The body was simple and inexpensive to produce due to the use of stamped sheet metal components, unlike the more expensive machined venturis used by spin-stabilized rockets. The fins of the 8 cm Raketen Sprenggranate differed from the M-8 and were mounted at 2° to impart spin to improve accuracy.

== Comparison ==
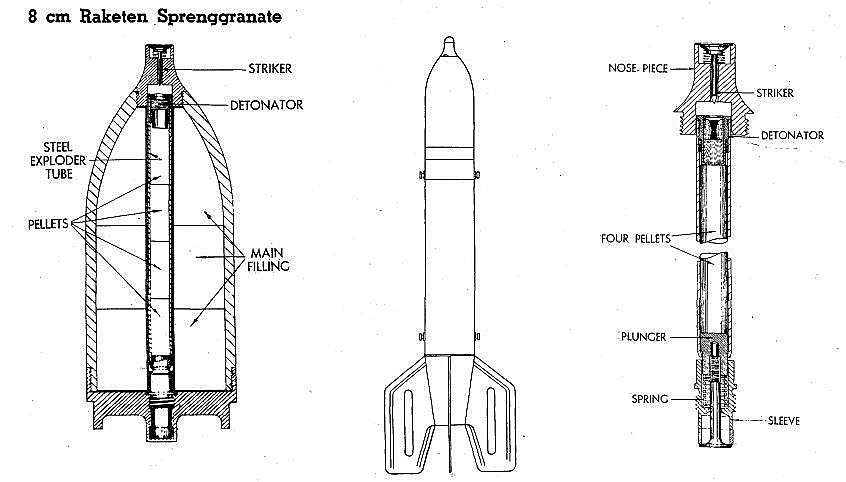
8 cm Raketen Sprenggranate components

Comparison
	Soviet	German
Diameter:	82 mm (3.2 in)	78 mm (3.1 in)
Length:	600 mm (2 ft)	724 mm (2 ft 4.5 in)
Total weight:	6.8 kg (15 lb)	6.9 kg (15 lb 3 oz)
Fuel weight:	1.1 kg (2 lb 7 oz)	1.9 kg (4 lb 3 oz)
Explosive content:	0.64 kg (1 lb 7 oz)	0.6 kg (1 lb 5 oz)
Speed:	340 m/s (1,100 ft/s)	290 m/s (950 ft/s)
Range:	5.9 km (3.7 mi)	5.3 km (3.3 mi)

== Photo gallery ==
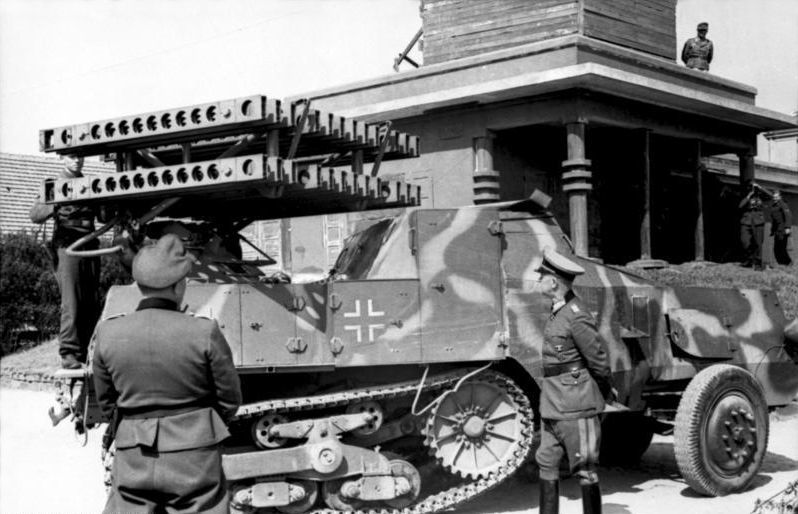
A weapons demonstration of a 24-round 8 cm Raketen-Vielfachwerfer on an armoured SOUMA MCL half-track. Located in Northern France, Atlantic Coast, Riva Bella, 30 May 1944.

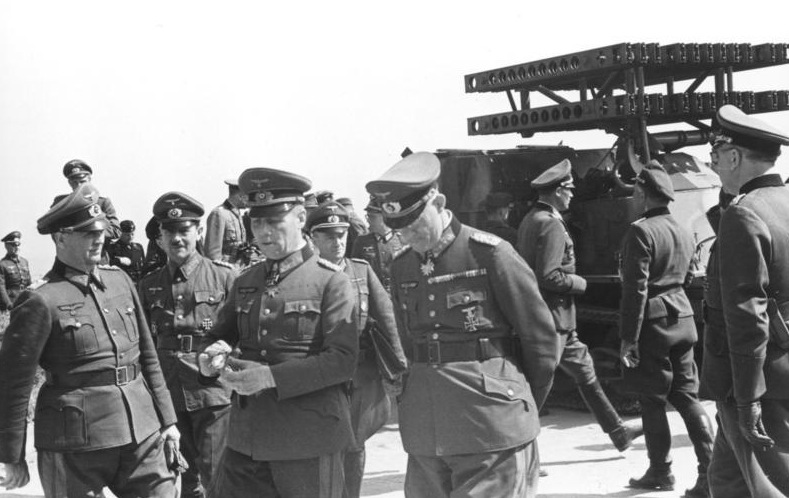
A collection of German officers including Generalfeldmarschall Erwin Rommel at Riva Bella 30 May 1944.

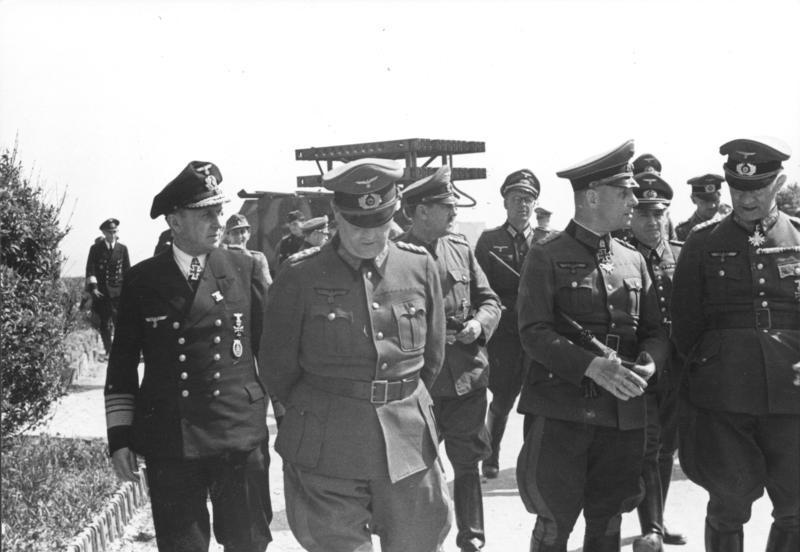

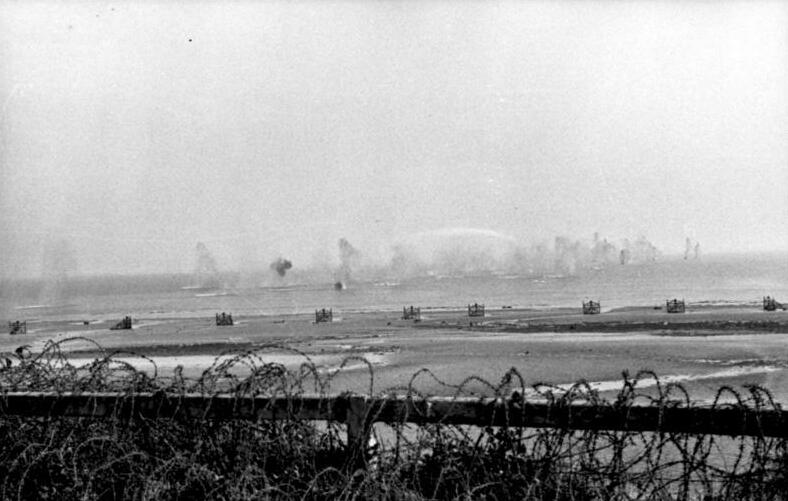
Shell splashes in the waters off Riva Bella (Sword Beach), May 30, 1944.
