= AMX 38 =

- Type: Light tank
- Place of origin: France

Production history
- Designed: 1937
- Manufacturer: Ateliers de construction d'Issy-les-Moulineaux
- Produced: 1939
- No. built: 2

Specifications
- Mass: 16.5 t (36,000 lb)
- Length: 5.28 m (17 ft 4 in)
- Width: 1.93 m (6 ft 4 in)
- Height: 2.22 m (7 ft 3 in)
- Crew: 2 (Commander/Gunner, Driver)
- Armour: 60 mm
- Main armament: 37mm SA 38 mle. 2 gun
- Secondary armament: 1x 7.5mm Reibel machine gun
- Engine: Aster; 160 hp
- Power/weight: 9.69 hp/tonne

The AMX 38 was a prototype French tank designed in 1937 at the AMX works. Designed as AMX's response to the 20-tonne tank programme intended to replace the aging Char D2, it was a faster and heavier alternative to Renault R35, in practice a cross-over between a light tank and medium tank.

== History ==
Ateliers de construction d'Issy-les-Moulineaux (AMX) participate in the competition to create the next generation light tank for the French Army. The AMX company started development in July 1937 and their tank project later received the designation "AMX 38".

== Design ==
The AMX 38 was designed to have better mobility than the Char D1, while having the same armour and a small weight increase. It was planned to have a 100-horsepower CLM diesel engine, 37mm SA 18 gun and the new APX-R turret.

== First prototype ==
When the first prototype was completed in the end of 1939, it differed vastly from the initial design. The vehicle was equipped with a 37mm SA 38 gun and a 7.5mm Reibel machine gun. The weight of the first prototype was 13.5 tons. It had a 130 hp Aster engine and a power-to-weight ratio of 9.62 hp/t. The maximum speed of the first prototype was 25 km/h. The turret was replaced by one designed by AMX, which closely resembles the turret of FCM 36. The AMX 38 had a tail piece at the rear to help the vehicle cross trenches. The crew consisted of two people, a driver and a commander/gunner.

However, the AMX 38 first prototype was proved to be inferior to other current French tanks both in armor and armament. As a result, the AMX company continued to redesign and improve the AMX 38.

== Second prototype ==
In December 1939, the second prototype was constructed. It was armed with the 47mm SA 35 gun, replacing the older 37mm SA 38 gun. The gun had better penetration and could destroy any German tank of that period. Additionally, the frontal turret and hull armor was increased to 60mm which is impenetrable by the standard German 3.7 cm Pak 36. The second prototype weight increased to 16.5 tons. The suspension had to be changed and the engine was to be upgraded to a more powerful Aster engine of 160 horsepower. The power-to-weight ratio of the second prototype was projected to increase to 9.69 hp/t.

== Development ==
Trials of both prototypes were underway when war broke out. The project was abandoned after the Fall of France.
