= FCM 36 =

French light infantry tank

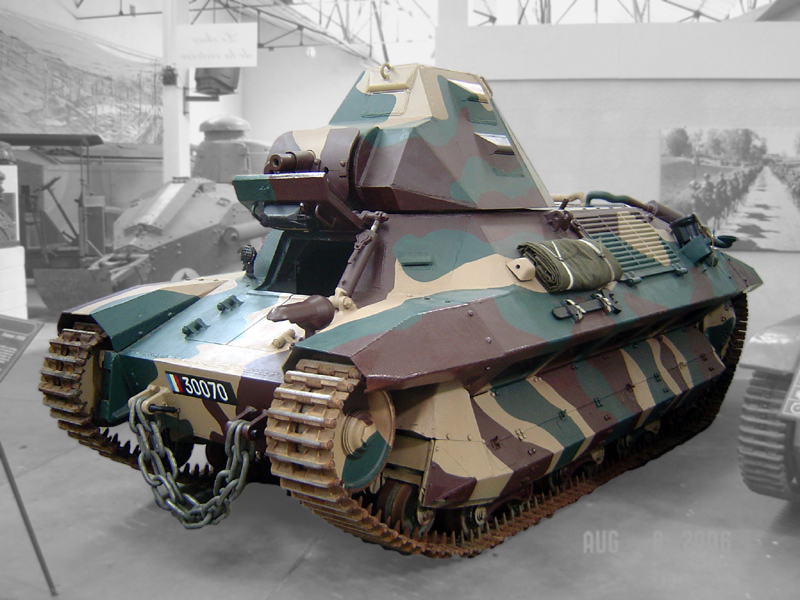
- The last surviving FCM 36 in the Musée des Blindés in Saumur
- Type: Light infantry tank
- Place of origin: France

Service history
- Wars: World War II

Production history
- Designed: 1933–1936
- Manufacturer: Forges et Chantiers de la Méditerranée
- Unit cost: ₣ 450,000
- Produced: 1938–1939
- No. built: 100

Specifications
- Mass: 12.35 metric tons
- Length: 4.46 m (14 ft 8 in)
- Width: 2.14 m (7 ft 0 in)
- Height: 2.20 m (7 ft 3 in)
- Crew: 2 (commander, driver)
- Armor: 40 mm
- Main armament: 37 mm L/21 SA 18 gun
- Secondary armament: 7.5 mm MAC31 Reibel machine gun coaxial
- Engine: V-4 Berliet diesel engine 91 hp (67 kW)
- Power/weight: 7.36 hp/tonne
- Transmission: 5 forward, 1 reverse
- Suspension: vertical coil spring
- Ground clearance: 0.36 m
- Fuel capacity: 217 litres
- Operational range: 225 km
- Maximum speed: 24 km/h (15 mph)

The FCM 36 or Char léger Modèle 1936 FCM, was a light infantry tank designed for the French Army prior to World War II. It had a crew of two and was equipped with a short 37mm main armament and a 7.5mm coaxial machine gun.

The FCM 36 was developed from 1934 onwards as part of a programme to replace the obsolete Renault FT. As it was more expensive to produce than competing designs, only a limited production of a hundred was authorised. It featured some advanced technologies such as a diesel engine and extensive use of welded sloped armour.

In 1940, the type equipped the 503e Groupement de Bataillons de Chars, which unsuccessfully counterattacked the decisive German breakthrough at Sedan.

== Development ==
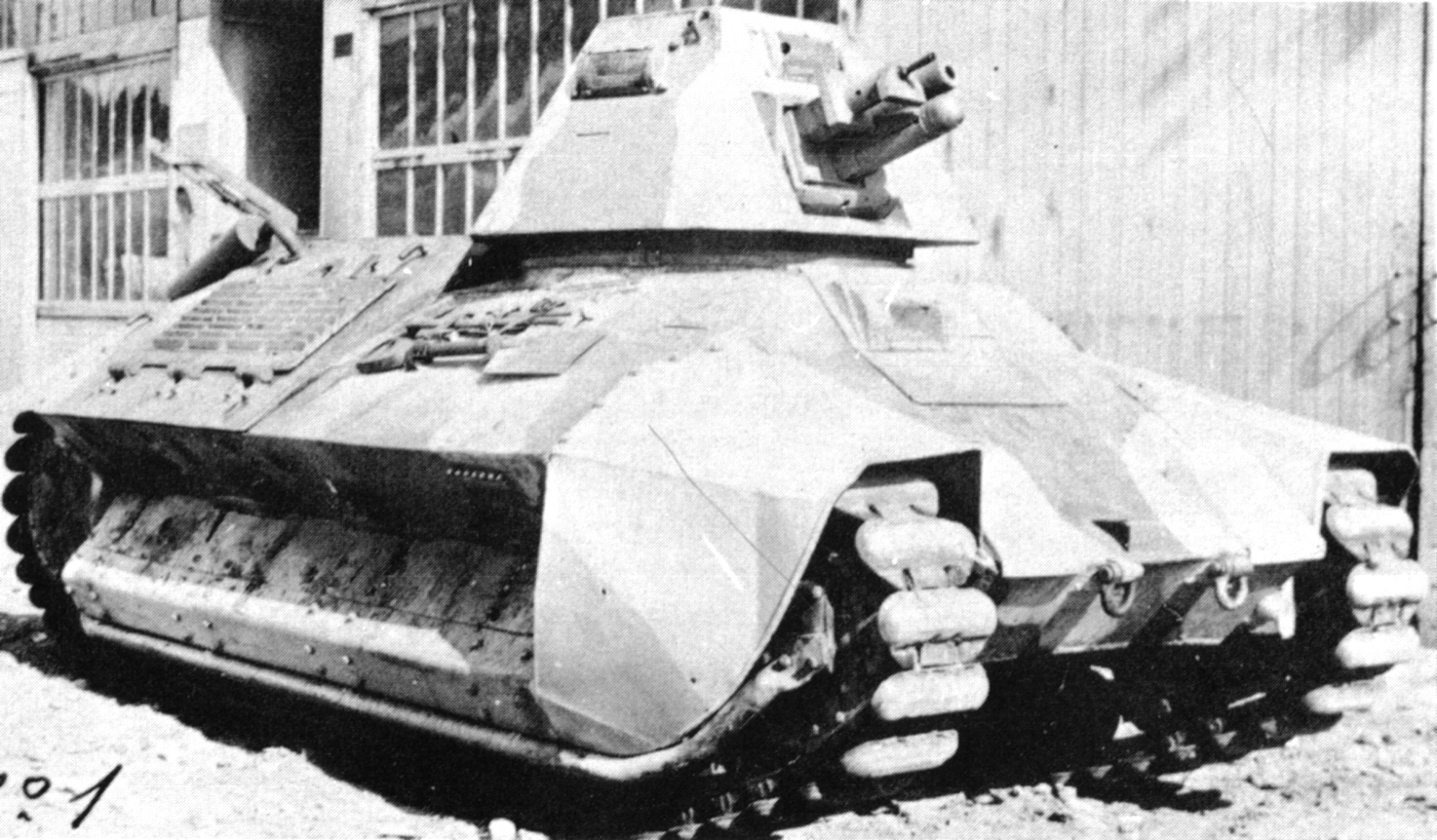
FCM 36 prototype

In 1933, the Hotchkiss company proposed to build a cheap mass-produced light infantry tank. In reaction to this proposal the French Army invited the whole of French industry to offer alternative designs. In the end, three of the competing prototypes would be taken into production: the Hotchkiss H35, the Renault R35 and the FCM 36.

The Forges et Chantiers de la Méditerranée (FCM), located at Toulon, had some previous experience with tank production as it had constructed the ten giant Char 2C tanks in 1921 and had been involved in the development of the Char B1. Engineer Bourdot, who had designed the suspension of the Char B, was ordered to create a modern tank design taking full advantage of the large electro-welding capacity of the wharf. In March 1934 he presented a wooden mock-up that was approved by the Army. On 2 April 1935 the prototype was delivered to the Commission de Vincennes, with a turret equipped with two machine-guns. The commission was quite impressed by the vehicle, especially because of its welded sloped armour and the use of a diesel engine promising a good range. It was a bit heavier than the specified nine metric tons at 10,168 kilogrammes. However the prototype was untestable because of mechanical problems. After the first evaluation had been finished on 9 June it was sent back to the manufacturer.

In fact FCM had not tested the prototype itself yet; this was now done and many shortcomings became apparent. As a result, the vehicle was completely redesigned with a new and lighter hull and turret configuration, suspension and track. The roof of the engine compartment was now bolted on to ease replacement. On 10 September it was again sent to Vincennes only to be sent back on 23 October to have its suspension reinforced. On 19 December it returned to be tested until 14 May 1936. It was then approved on the provision that the armour would be thickened from 30 to 40mm, according to the new specifications. This was done by welding an appliqué 10mm armour plate on top of the main armour, a feature maintained for the production vehicles. The prototype was now brought to the attention of the Commission d'Infanterie, who declared on 9 July that it was the best of all competitors, especially since it had been proven on 17 June to be completely gas-proof, a unique quality that was considered a very desirable feature at the time.

== Production ==
Even before the type had been approved, however, because of Germany's remilitarization of the Rhineland, on 26 May an order was hastily made for a hundred vehicles of the Char léger Modèle 1936 FCM for 450,000 FF a piece. The production vehicles had to be equipped with a 37 mm gun. The Hotchkiss H35 and Renault R35 would also be taken into production, and as these competing types were a lot cheaper they would constitute the bulk of the French light infantry tanks produced. The reason to coproduce the more expensive third type was its development potential. The FCM 36 was seen as the most advanced French tank and should function as a test bed for further improvements. This also meant there was no hurry to start series production. The production facilities only began to be prepared from December 1936 and actual manufacture was delayed for a year to first test a newer design with a stronger engine and a lighter track. Only when this did not render the expected results, the original type was produced, with the first delivery on 2 May 1938. During 1938 and 1939 several modifications were tested on vehicle number 30,057 including a new track, clutch and engine, but none of these would be applied on the existing vehicles.

On 12 May 1938 and 3 February 1939 two additional orders were made of a hundred each. However, when the last tank, series number 30,100, of the original order was delivered on 13 March 1939, FCM suddenly announced that it would permanently cease production unless the price was raised to at least 900,000 FF, apparently the actual cost of production. Also FCM indicated that given its increased demanded production quota of the Char B1, there simply would be no capacity to manufacture any FCM 36s before September 1940. In view of these circumstances Inspector-General Jacomet allowed the production of the hull to be discontinued. The FCM turret however had already been planned to become the standard for all light tanks, as the old standard APX-R turret in the beginning suffered from serious production delays; when these eased an earlier proposal to have it replaced after number 1350 was postponed; but it was still considered to cease production after number 2000 as the APX-R turret was heavier (1,552 to 1,287kg) and yet inferior in protection to the FCM turret because of constant quality problems with its cast steel that was either too soft or too brittle. However, this issue was complicated by the planned introduction of the longer 37 mm gun as tests showed that the welds of the FCM type had to be reinforced to prevent them from cracking by the stronger recoil; as a result the existing vehicles would not be fitted with the new gun.

== Description ==
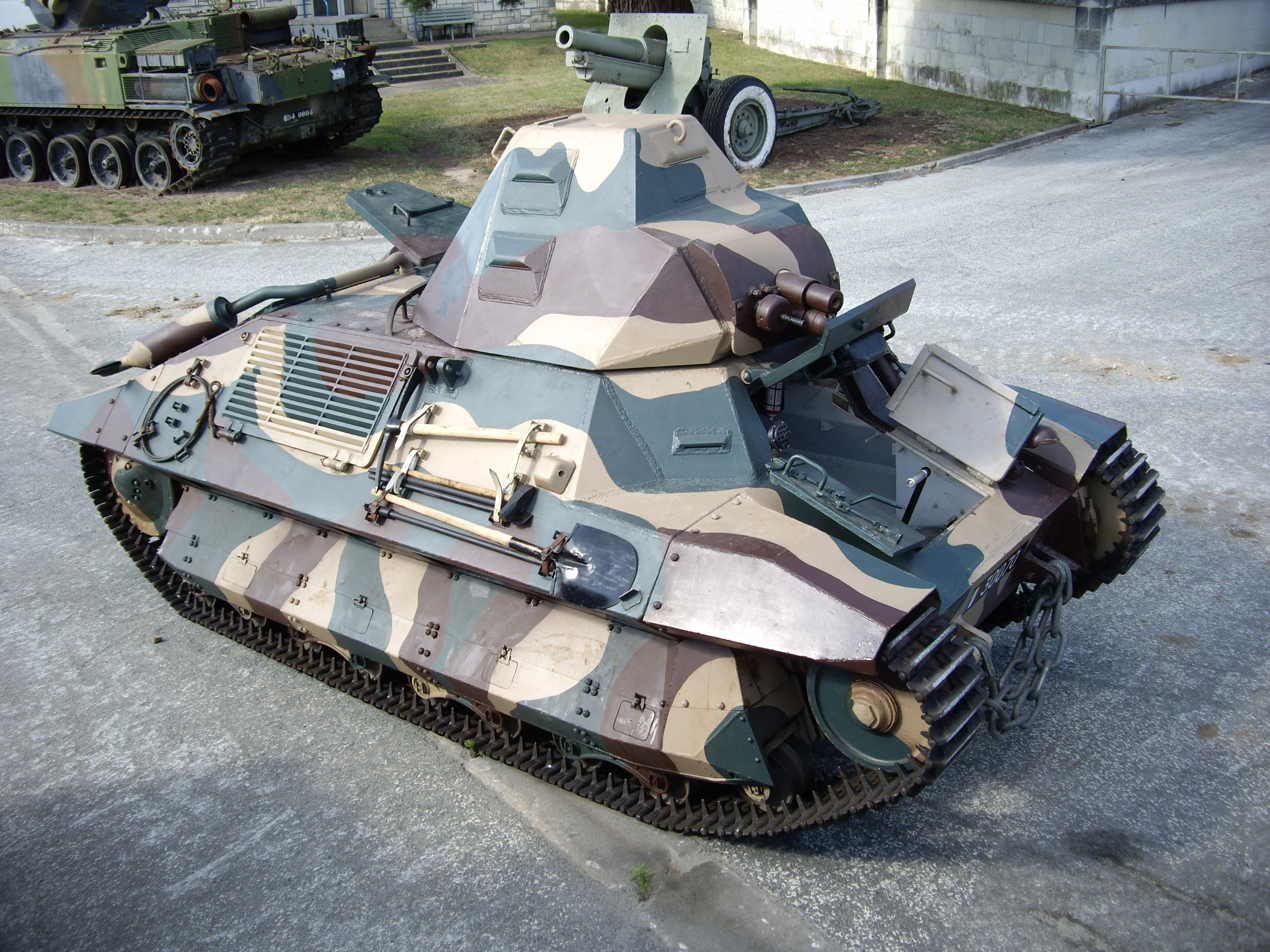
The FCM 36 at Saumur

The FCM 36 was a small vehicle, 4.46m long, 2.20m high and 2.14m wide, with a crew of two. It had a weight of 12.35 metric tons. The armour consisted of many panels electro-welded together into an pyramidal shape to avoid shot-traps and fully implement the principle of sloped armour. Such a configuration was unique at the time. This included the upper track run and the suspension units, protected by zig-zag armour plates. The engine deck is the only armour which is bolted as this enables easier access to the engine. As the armour is of good quality, the 40mm thickness angled at 30 to 45 degrees from the vertical, renders an equivalence of about 45–55mm, enough to regularly defeat the standard anti-tank guns of its day, even when the gun was ideally positioned. The reclining armour implied that more raking shots would quickly start to deflect. The type was the only actually produced French tank of the period that featured a diesel engine, which gave the vehicle a superior range of 225 kilometres from a fuel tank of 217 litres.

In other aspects, it conformed to the French design standards. French tanks were usually slow compared to their German, British or Soviet counterparts. The V-4 91hp Berliet diesel allowed for a top speed of just 24 km/h (15 mph). The suspension was accordingly simplistic, consisting of eight road wheels per side sprung by eight vertical coil springs. The tank could cross a two metres trench and climb a 70cm obstacle or an 80% slope. Also very limited is the armament: apart from the 7.5mm Châtellerault MAC31 machine gun, the standard short L/21 37mm SA 18 gun was fitted, a cannon with very poor anti-armour capacity.

== Operational history ==
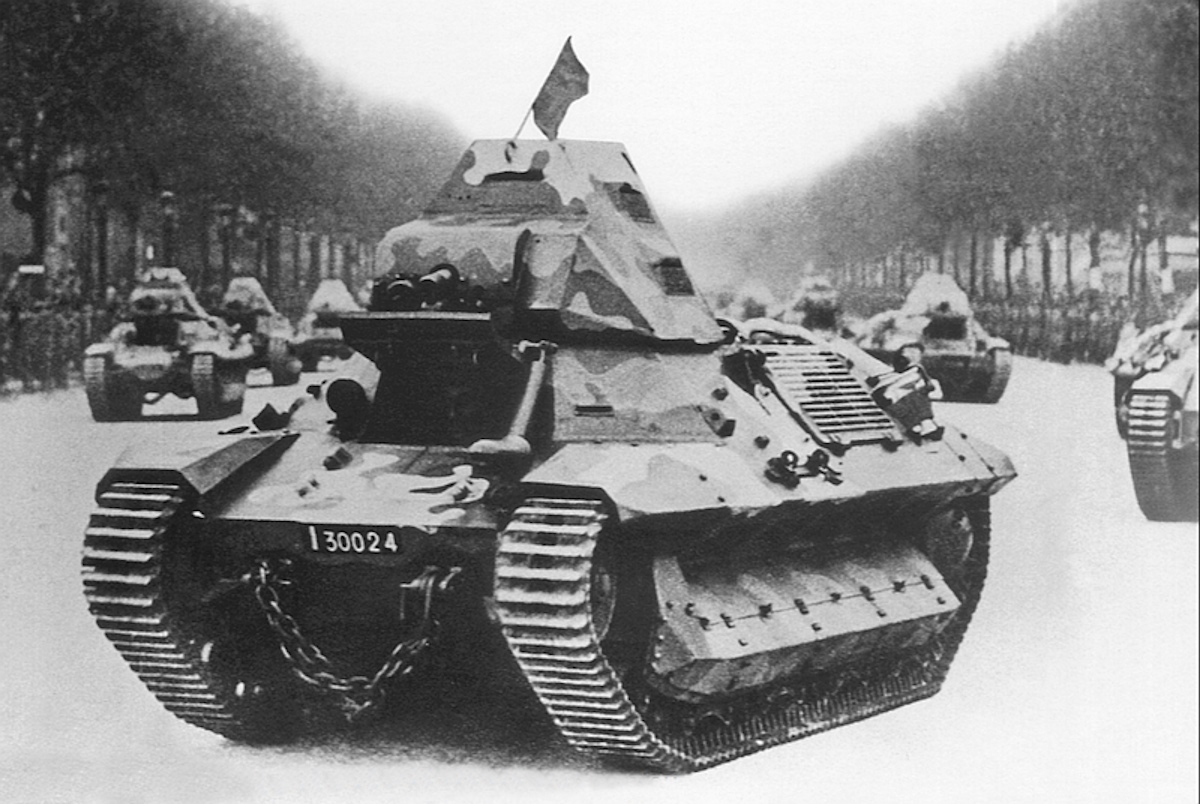
FCM 36s parading

As very few FCM 36s were to be produced, only a limited number of units would be equipped with the type. However these would happen to participate in the key event of 1940 during the Battle of France: the crossing of the Meuse river, by XIX Army Corps of Heinz Guderian on 14 May 1940.

In March and April 1939 two battalions were created. Unique among those battalions equipped with light infantry tanks, these units would be called Bataillon de Chars Légers or BCLs: the 4e and 7e BCL, that each received 45 FCM 36s. They had an organic strength of 39 (three companies of thirteen), a materiel company of six and used five tanks for driver training. Of the other ten tanks, eight were used for driver training, one was destroyed testing the efficiency of the German Teller mine, and one remained with the factory to serve as a test bed. On 25 August 1939, upon mobilisation, the BCLs were renamed Bataillons de Chars de Combat. The 7e BCC was incorporated into the 503e Régiment de Chars de Combat, the 4e BCC into the 502e RCC.

After war was declared against Germany in September 1939, both FCM 36 battalions were combined, together with 3e BCC, a R 35 unit, into the 503e Groupement de Bataillons de Chars, the armour reserve of the Second Army. When German infantry on 13 May 1940 established a bridgehead over the Meuse at Sedan, the FCM 36 battalions were late in the afternoon ordered to counterattack and reduce it, cooperating with an infantry regiment, as they themselves had no organic infantry component. Due to the rout of the last French defence line at Bulson during the night and the ensuing confusion, the approach march could not begin until early in the morning of the 14th, when the first German tanks started to cross the river on pontoon bridges. The German armoured vanguard and 7e BCC collided near Bulson. The French tanks destroyed some lighter German armoured fighting vehicles, but their weak guns were insufficient to deal with the Panzerkampfwagen III, armoured with 30 mm plate, though the latter had likewise trouble in penetrating the FCM 36 armour, as the tungsten core APCR round was not yet made available. Both sides slugged it out, often engaging at the shortest possible distance. In the end, the appliqué armour of the FCM 36 failed and the welds, being weaker points between the plates, including the lower turret corners just above the chassis, were penetrated. The 7e BCC had to withdraw, leaving 26 of the 36 employed tanks behind.

When 7e BCC had failed, the attack by 4e BCC was halted. The battalion attacked and defended Stonne on 15 May, but was driven from this key position with some losses. Until 23 May it would be attached to 3 DIM.

Both battalions were now kept in reserve to rebuild their numbers from the matériel and training units. During Fall Rot they executed successful counterattacks on 9 and 10 June on the Aisne position, against German infantry units. Later they tried to cover the retreat of the French Army, losing most of their combined strength of 45 in fights with German tanks.

=== German use ===
The Germans captured 37 FCM 36s, using the administrative designation Panzerkampfwagen 737 FCM (f) for them. After some improvised use by units in May and June 1940, they were not as such employed by them. In 1943 ten were rebuilt as Marder I tank destroyers, with the 75mm PaK 40 anti-tank gun and officially called 7.5cm PaK40(Sf) auf Geschützwagen FCM(f). These were employed by 21 Panzerdivision in the Battle of Normandy in 1944. Twelve were in 1942 rebuilt as self-propelled artillery, the 10.5cm leFH 16/18 (Sf) auf Geschuetzwagen FCM (f).

=== Postwar ===
One FCM 36 survives at the Musée des Blindés at Saumur. It has been restored to running condition.
