= Atelier de Construction de Puteaux =

French Army arsenal

The Atelier de Construction de Puteaux (APX) (English translation: "Puteaux Construction Workshops") was a state arsenal belonging to the French Army. It was located at 8, quai national in Puteaux.

== History ==
Atelier de Construction de Puteaux was in charge of making ammunition and carrying out tests. The factories also produced small and medium-sized equipment (firearms and knives), while the so-called “manufacturing” workshops produced larger equipment (artillery pieces).

Atelier de Construction de Puteaux disappeared after the Second World War, being transferred to Satory and merged with Ateliers de construction d'Issy-les-Moulineaux (AMX), which specialized in the construction of tanks and other armored vehicles.

Atelier de Construction de Puteaux had two responsibilities:

To design new weapons for the French Army. It specialized in small arms and medium caliber weapons and their accessories: such as machine guns, cannon, tank turrets, Telescopic sights for rifles, missiles etc.

And for serial production of those weapons, alone or concurrently with other factories.

== Atelier de Construction de Puteaux achievements ==
=== Arms designs ===
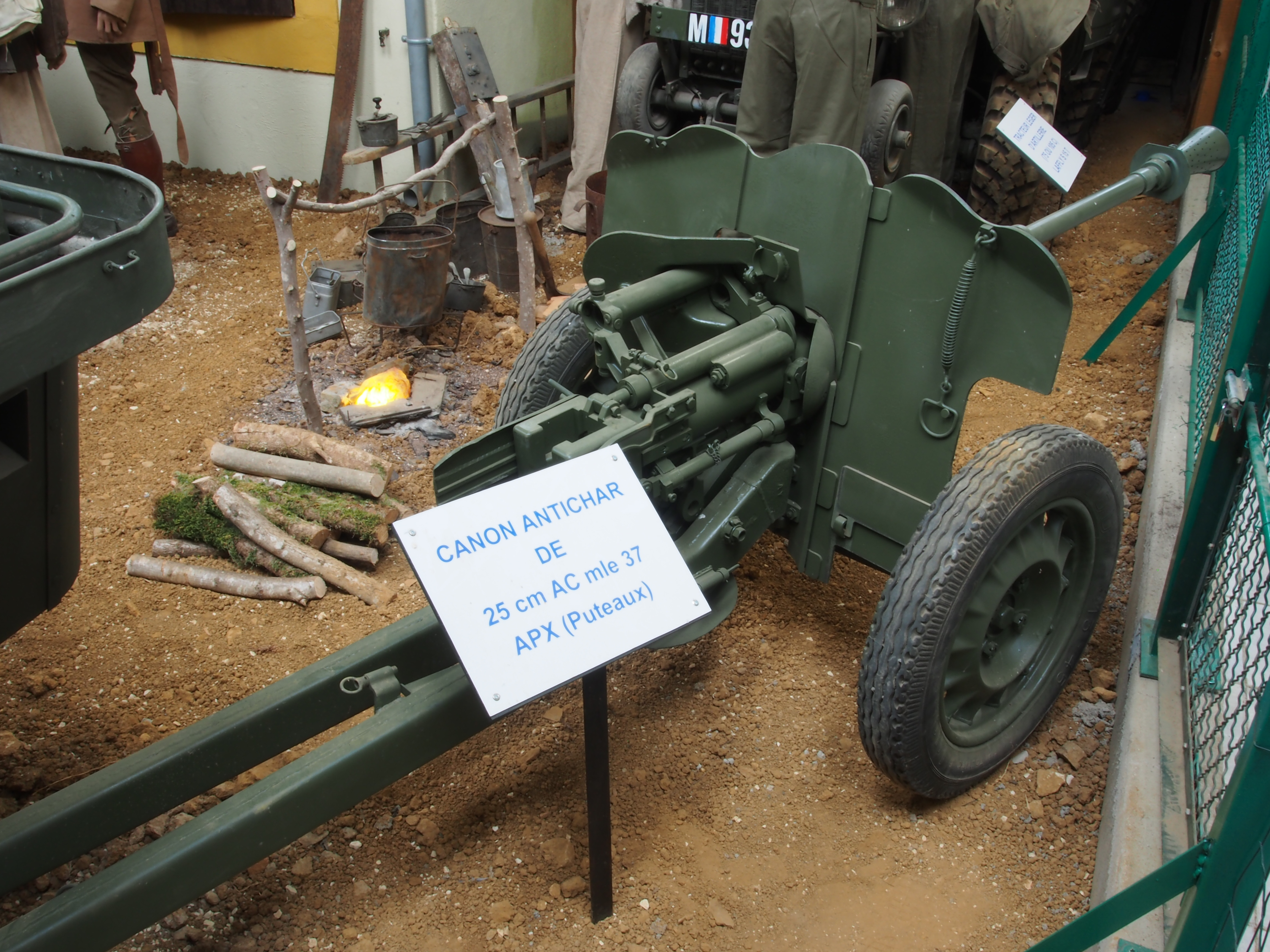
One 25 cm AC mle 37 APX.

- 1888: prototype of Berthier rifle.
- 1905: Puteaux modèle 1905 machine gun. Only a few hundred copies were made because of its many defects. It was simplified and mass-produced by the Manufacture d'armes de Saint-Étienne (MAS) as the St. Étienne Mle 1907 and used in the two world wars.
- 1910-1913: autocanon de 75 mm modèle 1913, a self-propelled anti-aircraft gun.
- 1915: prototype of the Fusil Mitrailleur Modele 1915 CSRG, better known as "Chauchat".
- 1918: 37 mm semi-automatic cannon model 1918 (37 mm SA 18) for light tanks.
- 1935: 25 mm APX modèle 1937, shortened version of the light 25 mm Hotchkiss anti-tank gun.
- 1938: 75mm high-velocity APX gun for the ARL V 39, modified from the 75mm 1929 casemate fortress gun.
- 1969: Rapid anti-tank weapon (ACRA).

=== Weapon accessories ===
- 1957: firing scope of the MAS-49 rifle.

=== Tank turret ===
- 1934: APX 3B turret fitted on the Panhard 178.
- 1935: APX 5 turret mounted on the AMR 35 ZT 2 and Gendron-Somua AMR 39.
- 1936: APX standard turret fitted on the prototype of the Hotchkiss H35, prototype of the Renault R35 and the FCM 36.
- 1938: APX-R turret fitted on the H39 variant of the Hotchkiss H35, the Renault R35 and the Renault R40. An APX-R tank turret was planned to be mounted on the AMX 38.
