= AMX Chasseur de Char =

AMX Chasseur de Chars
- Type: Tank Destroyer
- Place of origin: France

Specifications
- Mass: 34 metric tonnes
- Length: 7.38 m (24 ft 3 in) (hull); 11.12 m (36 ft 6 in) (gun forward)
- Width: 3.25 m (10 ft 8 in)
- Height: 2.7 m (8 ft 10 in)
- Crew: 4 (commander, gunner, loader, driver)
- Armor: 20-30 mm
- Main armament: Canon de 90 mm SA mle. 1945
- Secondary armament: 1x Coaxial machine gun, 1x Hull machine gun
- Engine: Maybach HL 295 12 cylinders 1200 hp
- Transmission: AK5-250 5-speed
- Suspension: Torsion bar

The AMX Chasseur de Chars (English translation: Hunter of Tanks or Tank Hunter), abbreviated as the "AMX CDC", was a French tank destroyer concept, designed in 1946.

== History ==
After World War II, there was a pressing need for the French Army to acquire a modern tank with a heavy armament.

In 1946, the AMX company presented a lightly armoured 34 tonne tank destroyer based on the AMX M4 chassis, but fitted with a modern rounded sleek turret.

The tank destroyer was equipped with the Canon de 90 mm SA mle. 1945 gun and had an autoloader. It could hold 90 shells.

The 1200 hp engine and light weight of the AMX CDC would have resulted in a fast tank destroyer. The AMX CDC fuel capacity was 1700 liters of gasoline, allowing it to operate for six hours.

The project was terminated with no prototypes having been built.
