= Renault R40 =

French light infantry tank

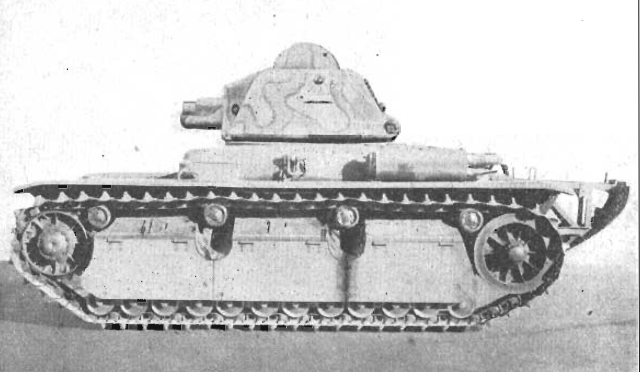
R40 with the old Puteaux SA 18 gun.

The Renault R40 or Char léger modèle 1935 R modifié 1939 was a French light infantry tank that was used early in World War II, an improvement of the Renault R35, of which it is often considered a variant.

== Development ==
In the late thirties, there had been several projects to improve the Renault R35 light infantry tank. One of these was directed to the improvement of the horizontal rubber spring suspension system that, apart from being less reliable than originally hoped for, caused an uncomfortable ride, high track and tread wear and an unfavourable weight distribution. The type tended to get stuck in soft terrain. Several solutions were proposed, among them an overdrive, new wheel tyres, a freewheel in the gear box, the fitting of grousers or studs on the existing tracks, or the adoption of a new track type. None of these were satisfactory.

Apart from Lorraine, whose proposal based on the Lorraine 37L suspension was rejected as too heavy and complicated to refit, both the AMX factory and the Renault design bureau developed several solutions to this problem from 1937. AMX had its origin in a nationalisation of parts of the Renault company, which resulted in a natural rivalry between the two design bureaux. Renault proposed a type with doubled wheels on the original bogies (which thus would result in ten road wheels per side) combined with a new track using shorter links, a second type with vertical coil springs and a third type lengthened with a sixth road wheel at the rear, which would also entail a larger wheel diameter. The systems with the six larger wheels or the ten smaller ones could also be used to upgrade existing vehicles. However, after tests from 19 May until 26 December 1938, an AMX design using six vertical coil springs covered with 8 mm armour plating with twelve road wheels per side, was selected on 16 February 1939. The type superficially resembled the suspension of the earlier Char D1 and Char D2 but was in fact inspired by the Char B1 suspension. It also used the same track as the Char B1, reducing the number of track links compared with the R35 from 125 to 56. The AMX suspension resulted in a superior speed on varied terrain and could climb steeper slopes. The Renault system with ten wheels to the contrary slowed the tank and led to a higher fuel consumption. This was not compensated by a discernible improvement of the steering qualities. However, the AMX system also had its drawbacks. It added a weight of 1.1 tonne to the tank, while the weight penalty was just seven hundred kilogrammes with the Renault six-wheel suspension and only 110 kilogrammes for the ten wheel system. Also, the longer track links caused a heavy clattering during road travel, reminiscent of the noise made by the Renault FT. Fuel consumption was 40% higher.

The variant was named the Char léger modèle 1935 R modifié 1939. At first, it was literally envisaged as a modification, also to be retrofitted to existing vehicles, but the emergency caused by the outbreak of war in September led to a change in policy: the new suspension would only be implemented on the R35 production run, from the 1501st vehicle onwards, to take place in February 1940. In late 1939, retrofitting the existing vehicles with the cheaper Renault vertical coil suspension was considered, as it could be done by field workshops and thus pose less of a burden to French industry.

== Production ==
The change, however, was delayed and went only into effect in May 1940 from the 1541st vehicle onwards. It coincided with a number of other improvements, such as a longer and thus much more powerful SA 38 Long 35 37 mm gun in the adapted cast APX-R1 turret, giving the type a good antitank capacity, and a tail to facilitate climbing. The number of rounds carried decreased from 102 to 90. A fundamental advance in tactical effectiveness compared to the R35 was that the R40s were equipped with a radio set, which had not been standard for any French light tank until then.

In May, about sixty R40s were manufactured out of a total R35/40 production that month of 91. It is uncertain how many R40s were produced before production was halted in June 1940; certainly 130 and probably 145 hulls were manufactured, but likely these did not all have their turret fitted. It had been intended to keep production levels at 120 per month for the duration of the war and introduce the lighter welded FCM turret in the second half of 1940. In May 1940, the R35 had the largest production of any Allied (or indeed Western) tank but it was planned to having it surpassed by that of the much faster "H39", reflecting the emphasis on the formation of new armoured divisions, for which the slow R40 was less than ideal; the "new" suspension was really rather old-fashioned and could not be combined with a high speed, as earlier experience with the Char D3 and Renault VO projects had shown. Nevertheless, apart from donations to allies and units already formed in June, another 800 vehicles were needed to replace the Renault FTs of eight existing battalions and raise eight new battalions to bring their number to the planned final total of fifty light tank BCCs (Bataillions de Chars de Combat), forty of these equipped with Renault tanks.

As the new vehicles looked quite differently from the original R35, they were very generally, also in army documentation, called the "R40"; however, this was never their official type designation; officially these were still Renault R35s and their production was subsumed under the R35 run in the statistics; their serial numbers are continuous with the older R35 run.

== Operational history ==
Two new tank battalions, originally intended and trained to be equipped with Hotchkiss tanks to form the half-brigade of the new 4e DCR (fourth armoured division of the Infantry), the 40e Bataillion de Chars de Combat and the 48e BCC, were during the campaign of 1940 from 19 May as an emergency measure partly equipped with the R40 (30 and 29 respectively) and attached to the 2e DCR. This reflects the large matériel reserve of Renault tanks. Some R40s perhaps replaced losses in the older battalions. One of the two tank battalions of the Polish 10th Armoured Cavalry Brigade being formed in France was also partly equipped with first 24 R40s, which were then on 31 May given to 25 BCC, after which the Polish battalion received another 28 R40s, the last thirteen on 19 June.

There are no known surviving R40 vehicles.

== Literature ==
- Pascal Danjou, 2005, Renault R35/R40, Editions du Barbotin, Ballainvilliers
- Pierre Touzin, 1979, Les Véhicules Blindés Français, Éditions E.P.A.
