= Gendron-Somua AMR 39 =

Type of Armoured Car

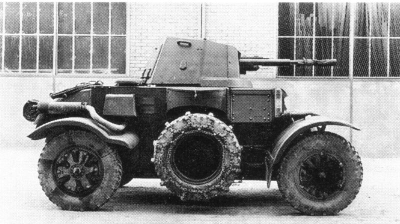
- Gendron-Somua AMR 39 third prototype
- Type: Armoured Car
- Place of origin: France

Service history
- Wars: World War II

Production history
- Designer: Mr. Gendron, Somua
- Designed: 1932-1939
- Manufacturer: Somua
- Produced: 1939
- No. built: 4
- Variants: 2

Specifications
- Mass: 6.15 t (13,600 lb)
- Length: 3.74 m (12 ft 3 in)
- Width: 2.05 m (6 ft 9 in)
- Height: 2.00 m (6 ft 7 in)
- Crew: 2 (Commander/Gunner, Driver)
- Armor: 15 mm
- Main armament: 1x 25mm SA 35 gun
- Secondary armament: 1x 7.5mm Reibel machine gun
- Engine: SOMUA; 79 hp
- Suspension: leaf spring
- Operational range: 400 km
- Maximum speed: 69 km/h

The Gendron-Somua AMR 39 was a prototype French armoured car.

== History ==
12 years after the end of World War I, the French fleet of armoured cars was still made up of obsolete White AM armoured car. On 16 January 1932, the High Command of the French Army initiated a Automitrailleuse de Cavalerie type Reconnaissance (AMR) project for a modern armoured car. Panhard, Renault, Peugeot and an independent inventor, Mr Gendron, took part in this project.

== Prototypes ==
=== First prototype ===
In 1934, Mr Gendron designed the first prototype of the Gendron-Somua AMR 39 and Somua produced it.

As Mr. Gendron noted that the French Army did not have the budget to buy expensive armored vehicles, he decided to maximise the price quality ratio by creating an unusual wheel configuration of 3x1 for the prototype. 2 pneumatic steering wheels were at the front while a single pneumatic wheel was at the back. An additional metal wheel with grousers was connected to the side to enhance cross country performance. The hull was box shaped and access for the crew was through two side doors. The driver compartment was in the front. A single sided hexagonal turret from the AMR 33 tank was mounted in the middle of the hull. A 4-cylinder petrol engine was placed at the back of the prototype and could output 75 hp. The main armament was a 7.5mm Reibel machine gun.

The prototype underwent trials but was rejected on the basis that it was unstable off road.

=== Second prototype ===
After receiving feedback from the trials, Mr Gendron switched to the conventional 4x4 wheel configuration. Two pneumatic steering wheels were at the front and back. Two metal wheels with cleated tyre chains were attached to the side. The modification to the chassis resulted in changes to the air intake, exhaust system and the location of the exhaust pipe.

The second prototype was completed in 1935. It subsequently passed trials and was approved for mass production. However, Mr Gendron lacked the means to mass produce armoured vehicles. Hence, mass production was conducted by Somua.

=== Third prototype ===
In 1938, an improved third prototype was developed by Somua. The turret changed to an APX 5 turret by Atelier de Construction de Puteaux. Main armament was upgraded to the 25mm SA 35 gun. A 7.5mm Reibel machine gun, which was the main armament of the first two prototypes, became secondary armament of the third prototype. The engine was also upgraded to 79 hp which allowed the armoured car to travel at 69 km/h. The maximum fuel consumption was 42 liters per hour. Trials were carried out and the third prototype passed as well.

== Development ==
In September 1939, an order for 150 Gendron-Somua AMR 39 was ordered by the French Army. However, due to the Fall of France, only 4 vehicles were built.

== Gallery ==
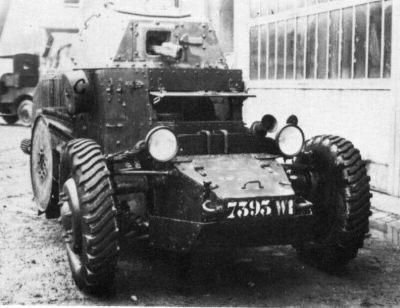
Gendron-Somua AMR 39 first prototype

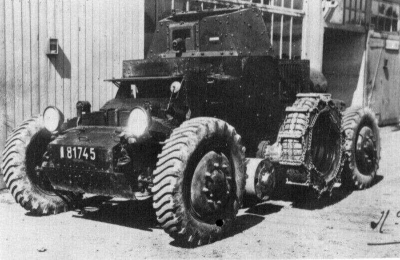
Gendron-Somua AMR 39 second prototype

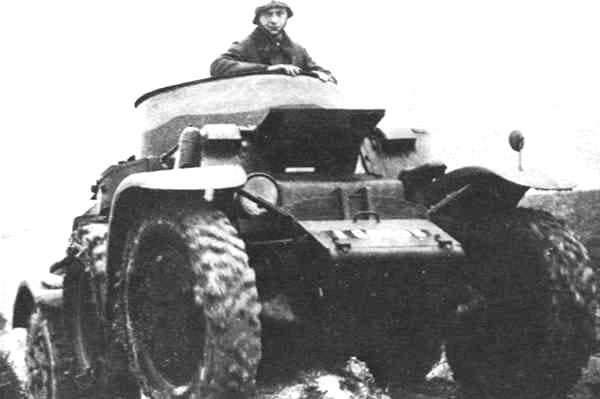
Gendron-Somua AMR 39 second prototype without turret undergoing trials

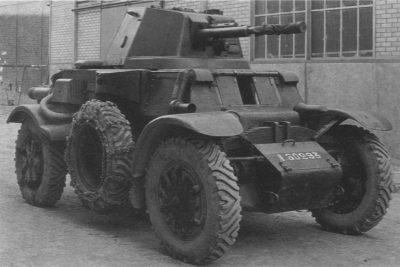
AMR 39 third prototype
