= Ateliers de construction d'Issy-les-Moulineaux =

Former French armoured vehicle manufacturer

The Ateliers de construction d'Issy-les-Moulineaux (AMX, English translation: construction workshops of Issy-les-Moulineaux) were machine shops that specialized in the construction of armoured vehicles for the French Army. They were born from the nationalization of the Renault factories in Issy-les-Moulineaux in 1936. The armored vehicles used names such as AMX-13, AMX-30.

== Models and products ==
The models below were not all mass-produced at the AMX. After its separation from Renault, AMX was mostly dedicated to the design and realization of prototype tanks and the production of vehicles specific in small series. It moved to Satory plateau where it merged with Atelier de Construction de Puteaux (APX).

Models designed but not mass-produced:

- AMX-32
- AMX 38 (prototype)
- AMX 40
- AMX-50
- AMX ELC (Engin Léger de Combat)

Models designed and mass-produced:

- AMX-10P
- AMX-10 RC
- AMX-13
- AMX-30
- AMX-30E
- AMX AuF1

This company also fabricated Puteaux SA 18 cannons.
