= Renault R35 =

French light infantry tank

Char léger Modèle 1935 R ("R35")
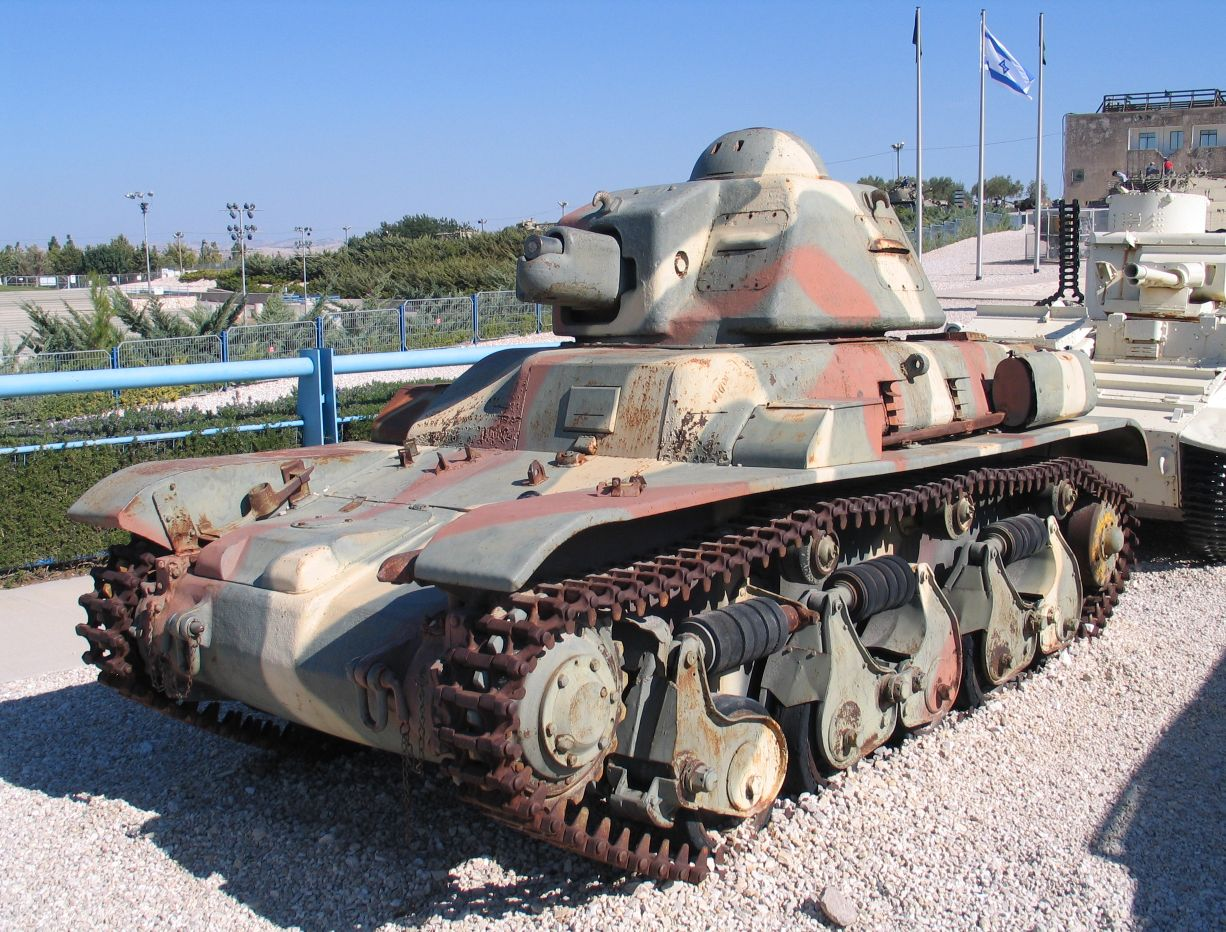
- R35 in the Yad La-Shiryon museum
- Type: Light infantry tank
- Place of origin: France

Service history
- Used by: See § Operators
- Wars: Second World War; 1948 Arab–Israeli War; 1958 Lebanon Crisis

Production history
- Designed: 1934
- Manufacturer: Renault
- Produced: 1936–1940
- No. built: R35: 1,540 "R40": 145 approx.

Specifications
- Mass: 10.6 metric tons
- Length: 4.02 m (13 ft 2 in)
- Width: 1.87 m (6 ft 2 in)
- Height: 2.13 m (7 ft 0 in)
- Crew: 2
- Armour: 43 mm
- Main armament: 37 mm L/21 SA 18 gun
- Secondary armament: 7.5 mm MAC31 Reibel machine gun coaxial
- Engine: Renault V-4 gasoline engine 82 hp
- Power/weight: 8.0 hp/tonne
- Suspension: Horizontal rubber cylinder springs
- Operational range: 130 km
- Maximum speed: 20 km/h (12 mph)

The Renault R35, an abbreviation of Char léger Modèle 1935 R or R35, was a French light infantry tank of the Second World War.

Designed from 1933 onwards and produced from 1936, the type was intended as an infantry support light tank, equipping autonomous tank battalions, that would be allocated to individual infantry divisions to assist them in executing offensive operations. To this end, it was relatively well-armoured but slow and lacking a good antitank capacity, fitted with a short 37 mm gun. At the outbreak of the war, the antitank role was more emphasized leading to the development and eventual production from April 1940 of a subtype with a more powerful longer gun, the Renault R40. It was planned to shift new production capacity to the manufacture of other, faster, types, but due to the defeat of France, the R35/40 remained the most numerous French tank of the war, with about 1,685 vehicles having been produced by June 1940. At that moment, it had also been exported to Poland, Romania, Turkey and Yugoslavia. For the remainder of the war, Germany and its allies would use captured vehicles, some of them rebuilt into tank destroyers.

== Development ==
The 1926 development plan foresaw the introduction of a char d'accompagnement, a cheap mass-produced light tank to replace the Renault FT of World War I vintage, to make it possible for the standard infantry divisions to execute combined arms infiltration tactics, seen as the only viable method of modern offensive warfare left for non-motorised units. The French army did not have the means to motorise more than a few select divisions. In 1930, this plan was replaced by a new one, giving more precise specifications. The first tank to be developed to fulfil its requirements, the Char D1, proved to be neither cheap nor particularly light. In 1933, Hotchkiss offered an alternative solution, the later Hotchkiss H35. For political reasons this proposal was turned into the Plan 1933 and the whole of French industry was in August 1933 invited to propose possible designs. Fourteen companies responded (among which Delaunay-Belleville) and five submitted a prototype: Hotchkiss itself, the Compagnie Général de Construction des Locomotives, APX, FCM and of course France's prime tank producer: Renault. Fearing that his rival Hotchkiss might well replace him as such, Louis Renault hurried to finish a vehicle; construction was soon in such an advanced stage that the changes in specification issued on 21 June 1934, to increase armour thickness from 30 to 40 mm, could not be implemented. On 20 December 1934, Renault was the first to deliver a prototype, with the project name Renault ZM, to the Commission de Vincennes.

In the spring of 1935, this vehicle was refitted with heavier armour and a standard APX turret, attached by the Atelier de Rueil between 18 and 25 April. The prototype was still being tested when international tensions increased due to German re-armament. This prompted an urgent demand for swifter modernisation of the French tank fleet. The ZM was to be put into production immediately. On 29 April 1935, an order of 300 was made, even before the final model could be finished, at a price of 190,000 French franc per hull (unarmed, without the engine and turret, the overall export price was ca. 1,400,000 francs in 1939, that is ca. 32,000 dollars by 1939 standards). The first series production vehicle was delivered on 4 June 1936 and had to be extensively tested again as it was different from the prototype.

== Description ==
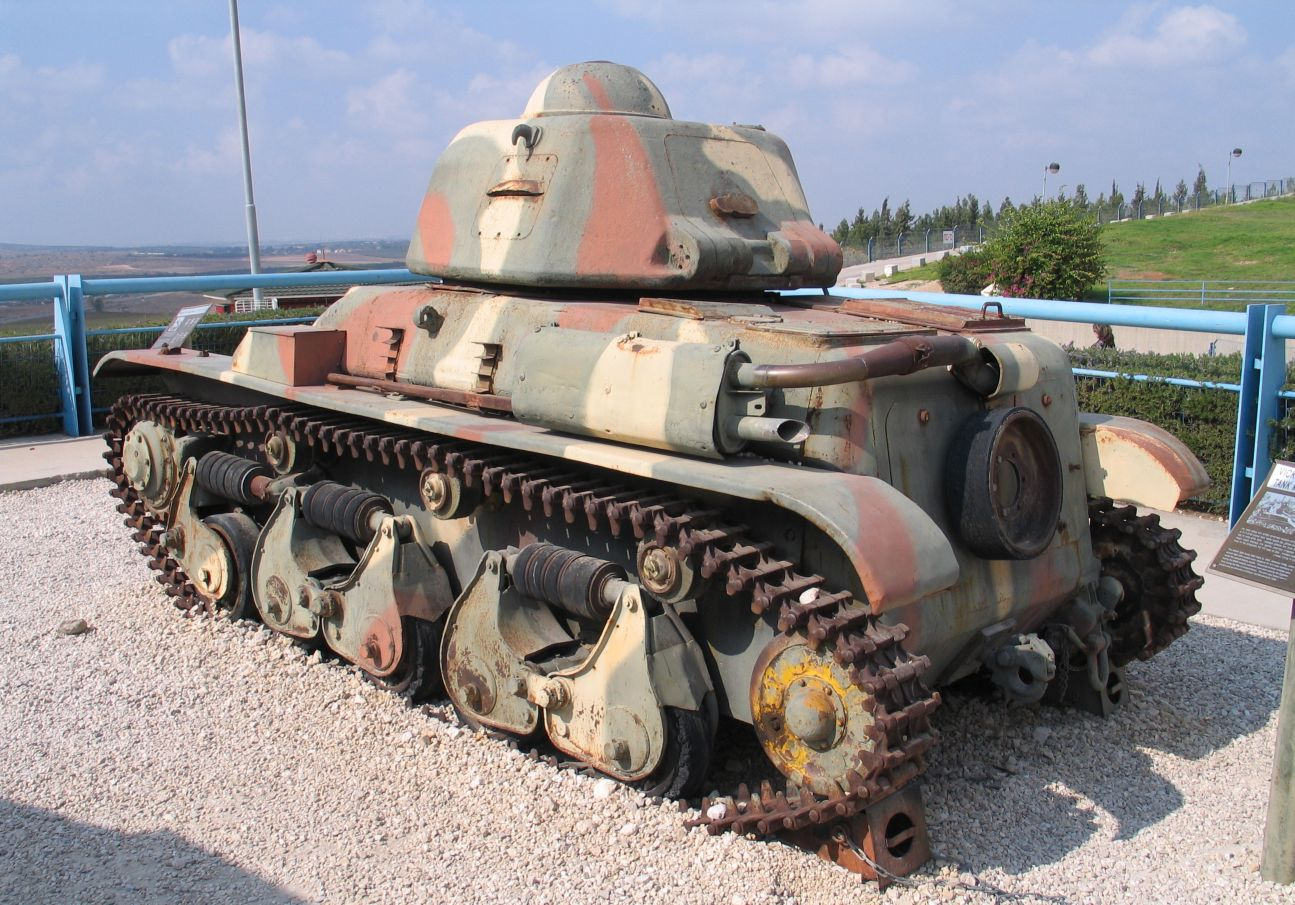
Renault R35: the hatch at the back of the turret is clearly visible

To save time, Renault based the suspension and running gear on that of the AMR 35, which had been designed for the cavalry. It had five wheels at each side, fitted with horizontal rubber-cylinder springs, like the AMC 35.

The hull, with a length of 4.02 m, consisted of three cast modules, with a maximum armour thickness of 43 millimetres, that were bolted together. Total weight was 10.6 metric tonnes (9.8 tonnes without fuel and ammunition). The bottom module carried on each side an independently sprung front wheel, two bogies and the driving sprocket at the extreme front. The final drive and differentials were housed at the right in the nose module. It was steered through a Cletrac differential with five gears and by engaging the brakes. The driver was seated somewhat to the left and had two hatches. The Renault V-4 85 hp engine was to the right in the short rear with the self sealing 166 litre fuel tank at its left. It rendered a road speed of 20 km/h and a range of 130 km. Cross-country speed did not exceed 14 km/h and the fuel consumption totaled 212 litre/100 km. From 1940 onward they were fitted with AMX tails to help in trench crossing.

The cast APX hexagonal turret had a 30 mm thick domed rotatable cupola with vertical vision slits (the highest point of 2.13 m) and had to be either hand cranked or moved about by the weight of the commander, the only other crew member. There was sometimes unofficially a seat installed for him but he most often stood. The rear of the turret had a hatch that hinged down that could be used as a seat to improve observation. The earliest vehicles were fitted with the APX-R turret (with the L713 sight) mounting the short Puteaux 37 mm L/21 SA 18 gun (the first batches were removed from Renault FT tanks which were then rebuilt as utility vehicles) and the 7.5 mm Châtellerault fortress machine gun. The cannon had a very poor armour penetration: only 12 mm at 500 metres. Afterwards the APX turret with the same cannon but the improved L739 sight and the standard Châtellerault 7.5 mm MAC31 Reibel machine gun was used because of delivery delays of the original weapon. There were also so many delays in the production of the turrets that after the first 380 hulls had been produced in 1936 and only 37 could be fitted with a turret, production was slowed down to 200 annually. The 7.5 mm machine gun's spent cartridges (from a total of 2,400) went down a chute through a hole in the floor. The tank carried 42 armour piercing and 58 high explosive rounds.

The R35 at first had no radio, except for the second battalion of the 507e Régiment de Chars de Combat (of Charles de Gaulle), but the R40 had the ER 54 installed. However, this added to the already heavy task load of the commander, who also acted as gunner and loader.

== Renault R40 and projects ==
In 1937, it had become obvious the original suspension system was unreliable and ineffective. After many trials, it was replaced in the 1940 production run, after the 1,540 vehicles had been built with the original design, by an AMX system using twelve wheels fitted with six vertical springs (AMX was the new name of the military division of Renault nationalised on 2 December 1936). About the same time, the radio and a much more powerful gun were introduced. The long-barrelled L/35 37 mm SA 38 in the adapted cast APX-R1 turret (with L767 sight) gave it an effective anti-tank capacity: 40 mm at 500 metres. The new combination was named the Char léger modèle 1935 R modifié 1939 but is more commonly known as the Renault R40. It was delivered in time to equip one battalion of the Polish 10th Armoured Cavalry Brigade of the Polish Army in France and the last two French tank battalions to be formed. It was intended to fit the R40 with the welded FCM turret in the second half of 1940, while refitting all existing R35s with the longer SA 38 gun and bringing R40 production levels up to 120 per month for the duration of the war. From January 1940, the vehicles of light tank unit commanders were gradually uparmed with the longer gun; but as absolute priority was given to tanks serving in armoured divisions, which were of the Hotchkiss type, of the 273 platoon, company and battalion commanders eligible in Renault units, only a few if any received this "R39". The only official possible exception to the rule that Hotchkiss tanks had to be modified first was made on 12 February 1940, when it was ordered to replace the turrets of 24 Infantry tanks, without specifying the type, present in depot or driver schools in order to obtain older turrets to be fitted on R35 export vehicles. In the same period, a crash programme was executed to produce 200,000 armour piercing rounds per month for the shorter gun, as there had been only minimal stocks of this ammunition type.

Several projects were based on the R35, such as a number of fascine carriers: these had frames or other contraptions mounted over the hull or turret with a fascine in them that could be dropped to fill trenches.

== Operational history ==
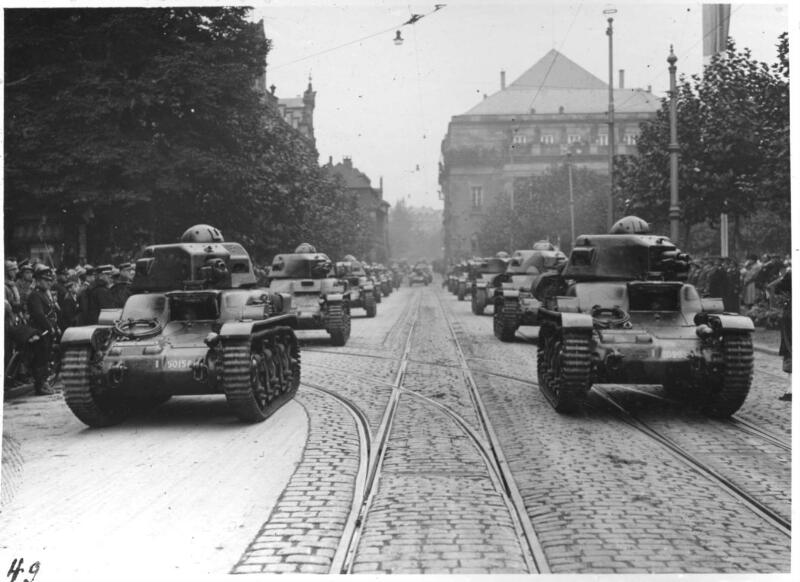
R35s parading in Strasbourg in 1938

The R35 was intended to replace the Renault FT as standard light infantry tank from the summer of 1936, but even by May 1940 not enough conscripts had been retrained and therefore eight battalions of the older tank had to be kept operational. On 1 September 1939, at the outbreak of war, 975 vehicles had been delivered out of 1,070 produced; 765 were fielded by tank battalions in France, 49 used for drive training, 33 were in depot and 45 present in the colonies. Of a total order for 2,300, at least 1,601 had been produced until 1 June 1940 — the numbers for that month are lacking — of which 245 had been exported: to Poland (50), Turkey (100; two batches of fifty each in February and March 1940), Romania (41 from an order for 200), and Yugoslavia (54). It is likely that the tanks exported to Yugoslavia (in April 1940) are not included under the 1,601 total and that overall production was 1,685; serial numbers known to be actually used indicate a production of at least 1670 vehicles.

=== France ===
On 10 May 1940, on the eve of the German invasion, in mainland France the R35 equipped 21 battalions, each fielding 45 vehicles. This gave 945 R35/R40 tanks in the French front line units. Of these, 900 were originally allocated at Army level in Groupements de Bataillons de Chars consisting of several battalions:

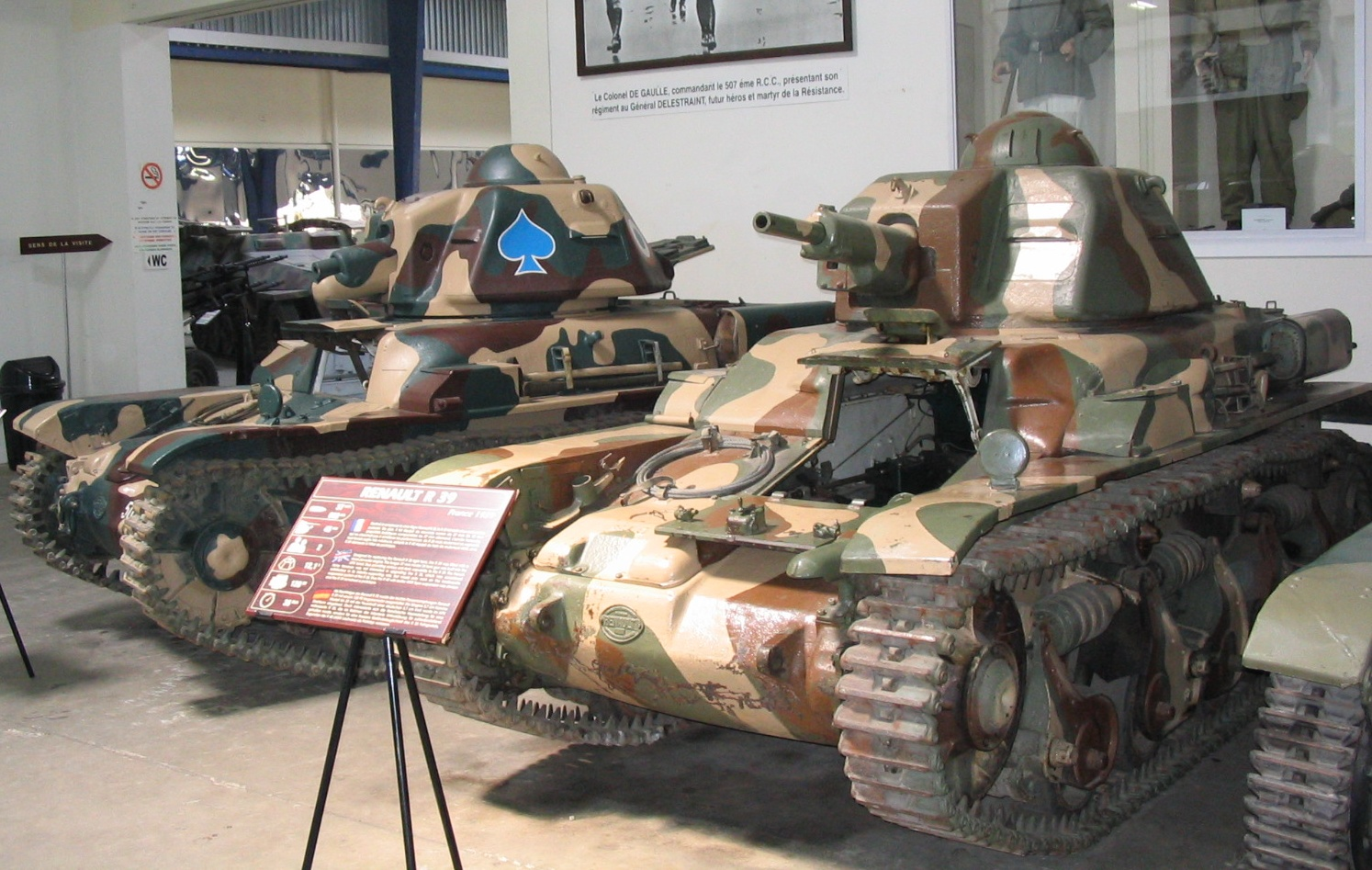
"R39" at the Musée des Blindés at Saumur next to an R35. Notice the longer gun, in this case a postwar conversion for the Gendarmerie.

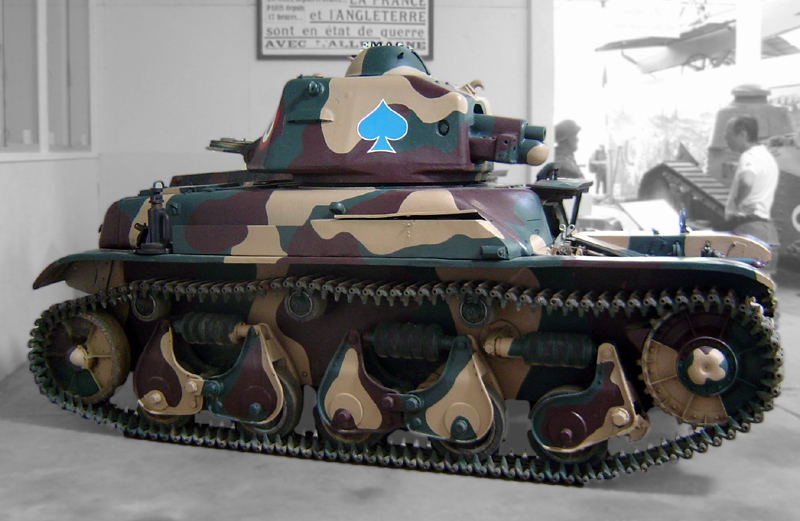
The R35 at Saumur

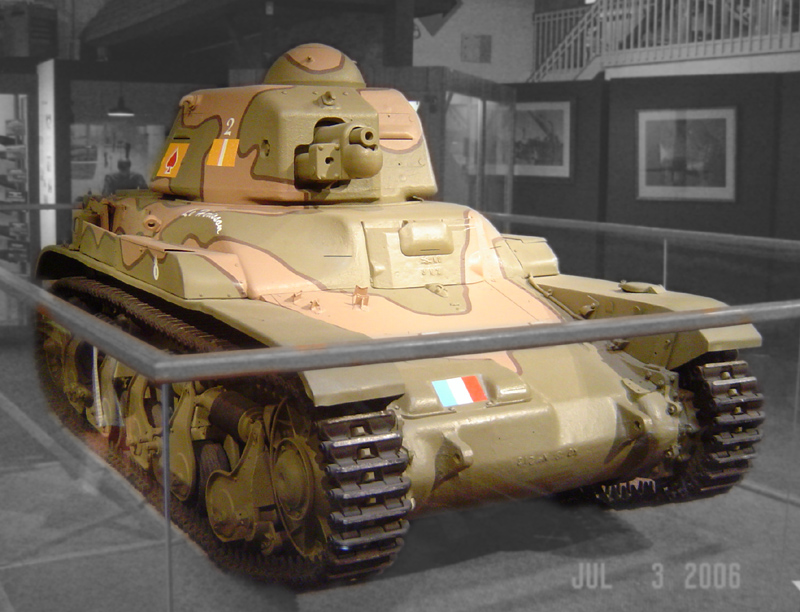
The R35 at Aberdeen

- VIIe Armée
  - GBC 510
    - 9eBCC (R35)
    - 22BCC (R35)
- Ie Armée
  - GBC 515
    - 13BCC (H35)
    - 35BCC (R35)
  - GBC 519
    - 38BCC (H35)
    - 39BCC (R35)
- IXe Armée
  - GBC 518
    - 6eBCC (R35)
    - 32BCC (R35)
    - 33BCC (FT)
- IIe Armée
  - GBC 503
    - 3eBCC (R35)
    - 4eBCC (FCM 36)
    - 7eBCC (FCM 36)
- IIIe Armée
  - GBC 511
    - 5eBCC (R35)
    - 12BCC (R35)
  - GBC 513
    - 29BCC (FT)
    - 51BCC (Char 2C)
  - GBC 520
    - 23BCC (R35)
    - 30BCC (FT)
  - GBC 532
    - 43BCC (R35)
- IVe Armée
  - GBC 502
    - 20BCC (R35)
    - 24BCC (R35)
  - GBC 504
    - 10BCC (R35)
    - 343 CAC (FT)
    - 344 CAC (FT)
- Ve Armée
  - GBC 501
    - 1rBCC (R35)
    - 2eBCC (R35)
    - 31BCC (FT)
  - GBC 508
    - 21BCC (R35)
    - 34BCC (R35)
  - GBC 517
    - 19BCC (Char D2)
- VIIIe Armée
  - GBC 506
    - 16BCC (R35)
    - 36BCC (FT)
    - 17BCC (R35)
    - 18BCC (FT)
- Armée des Alpes
  - GBC 514
    - Bataillon de Chars des Troupes Coloniales (FT)

These pure tank units had no organic infantry or artillery component and thus had to cooperate with infantry divisions. However, on 15 May, 135 R35s (2, 24 and the new 44 BCC) were allocated to the provisional 4th DCR (Division Cuirassée). Two more new battalions, the 40th and 48th Bataillion de Chars de Combat, though still not having completed training, were used to reinforce 2nd DCR, the first equipped with 15 R35s and 30 R40s, the second with 16 R35s and 29 R40s bringing the total organic strength to 1035. In addition the 1st and 2nd Tank Battalion of the Polish 10th Armoured Cavalry Brigade, at first training with Renault FTs, were equipped with 17 R35s and about 24 R40s in late May; in June the R40s had been given back but replaced by 28 new ones. At the same time, 1, 6, 25, 34 and 39 BCC were used to reconstitute 1DCR, 10 BCC reinforced 3DCR and 25 BCC was reconstituted with 21 R35s and 24 (ex-Polish) R40s. As about 300 tanks from the materiel reserve were issued to these units as well, around 800 of the 1,440 available R35s ended up in armoured divisions after all.

==== French colonies ====
Two R35 battalions (63 and 68 BCC) with 45 and 50 tanks respectively were in Syria, a French mandate territory, and 30 were in Morocco, 26 serving with 62 BCC and four in depot. The tanks in Syria would fight during the allied invasion of that mandate territory in 1941 and then be partly taken over by the Free French 1e CCC; those in North Africa fought during Operation Torch in November 1942.

==== Postwar ====
Some R35s served after the war in the Gendarmerie, as "R39s" refitted with SA 38 guns. They were phased out from 1951 in favour of the Sherman tank.

=== Germany ===
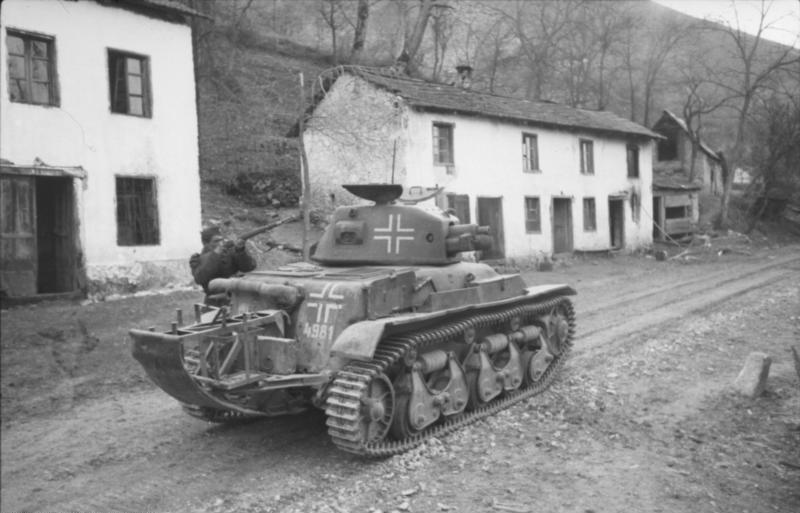
A Renault R35 in German service in 1942

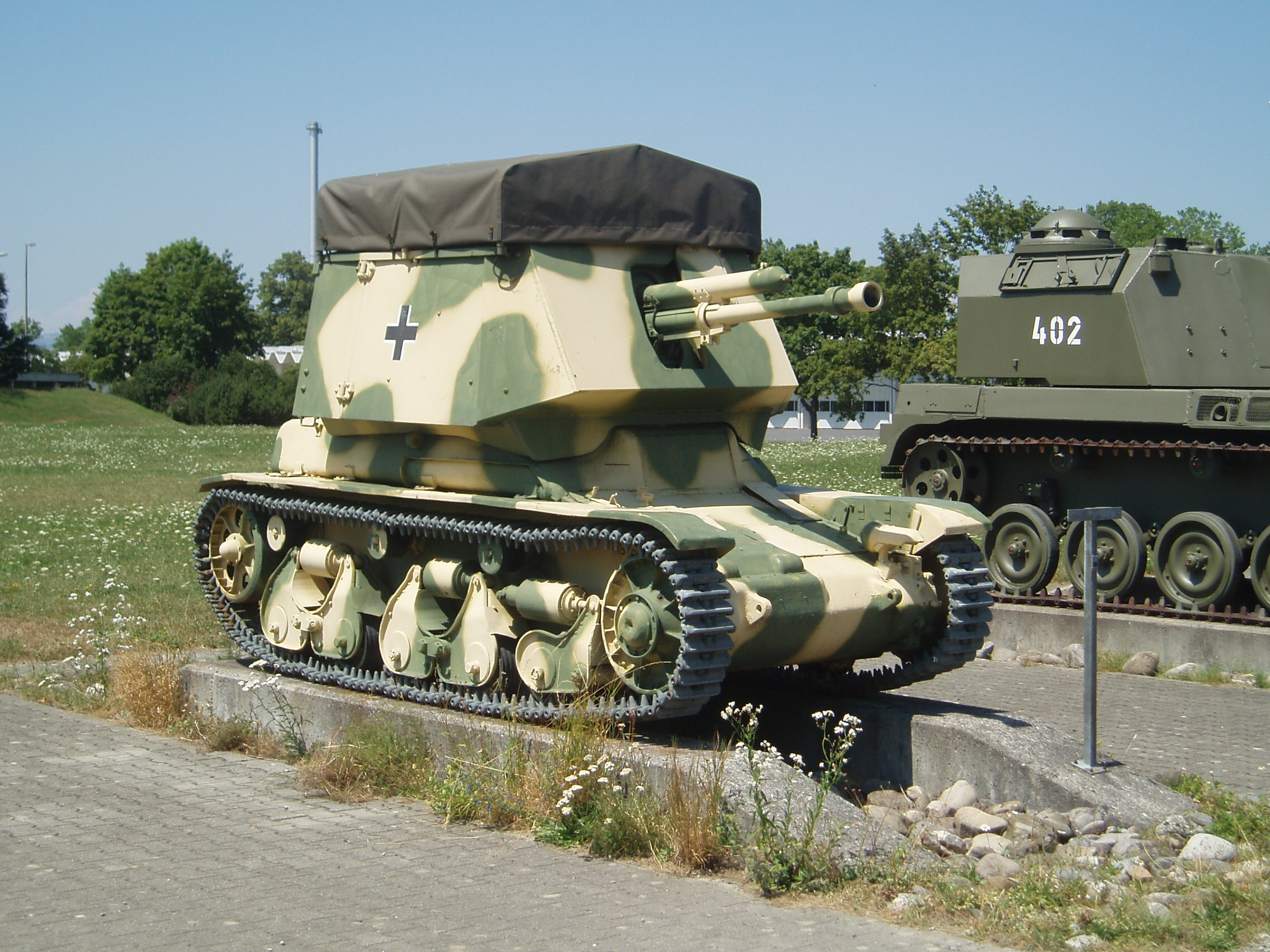
4,7cm PaK(t) auf Panzerkampfwagen 35R(f) ohne Turm

The majority (843) of R35s fell into German hands; 131 were used as such as Panzerkampfwagen 35R 731 (f), issued to panzer units and mainly used for security duties or driver training, or used on armoured trains; most were later rebuilt as artillery tractors and ammunition carriers after removing the turret.

A considerable number, 174 according to some sources, were converted into a 47 mm tank destroyer to replace the Panzerjäger I: the 4,7 cm PaK(t) auf Panzerkampfwagen 35R(f) ohne Turm. The tank destroyer version had the turret replaced with an armoured superstructure mounting a 47mm kanon P.U.V. vz. 36 (Škoda A6) anti-tank gun. The vehicles were converted by Alkett between May and October 1941 to try and make an equivalent vehicle to the Panzerjäger I. The result was not as successful as the Panzerjäger I, mainly due to the slow speed of the R35 and the overloaded chassis. A few were deployed in Operation Barbarossa, most were deployed in occupied territories, such as the Channel Islands, The Netherlands (with Pz.Jg.Abt.657, part of Pz Kompanie 224) and France. They fought in the battles for Normandy with Schnelle Brigade 30 in 1944 (five attached to the 3rd company, Schnelle Abteilung 517), and around Arnhem with Pz.Jg.Abt. 657. Other possible users include 346 Inf. Div. in Normandy and 59th Inf. Div who fought the 101st Airborne during Operation Market Garden.

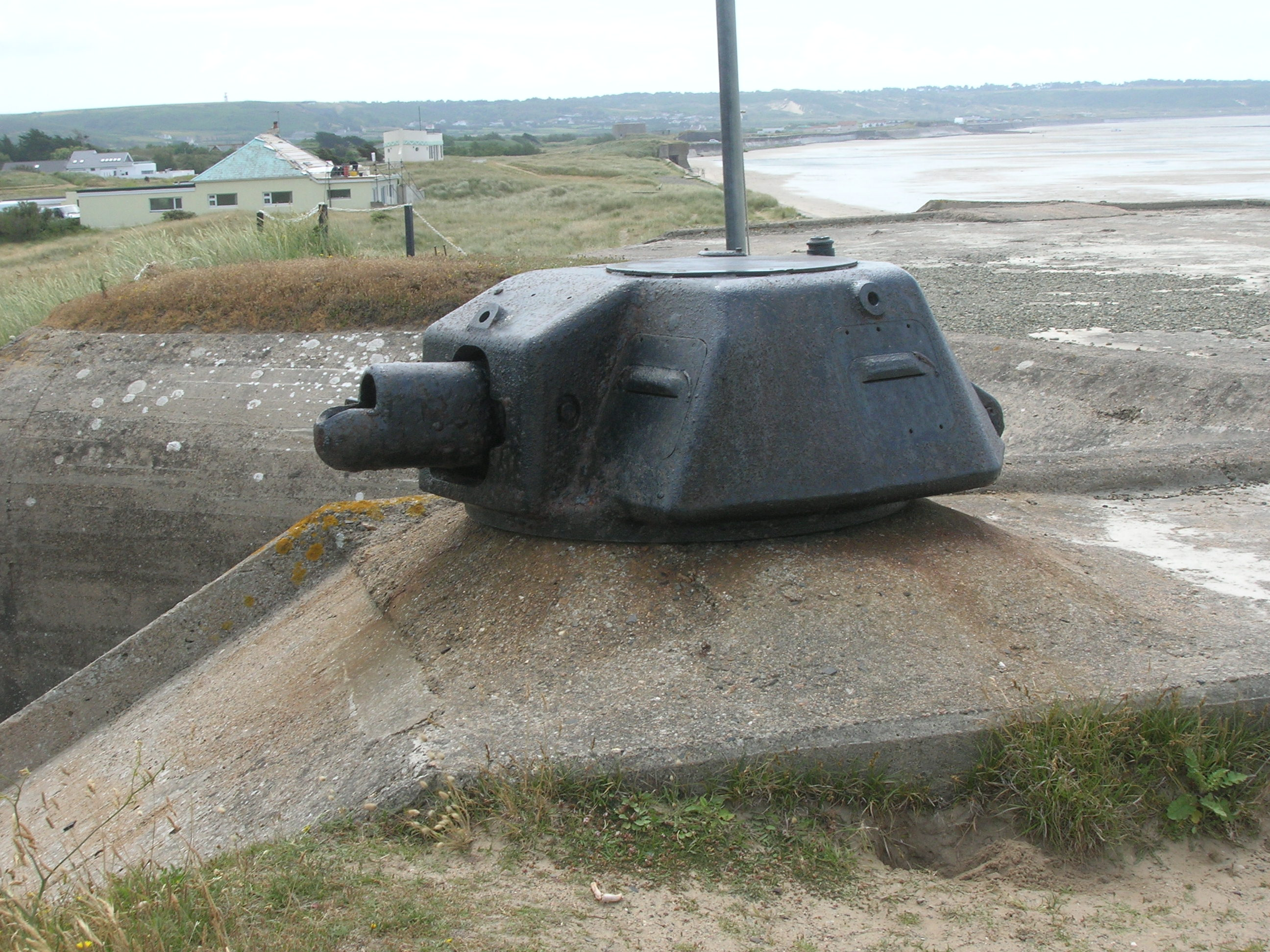
Tobruk protecting the entrance to the bunker that now houses the Channel Islands Military Museum. This turret was originally mounted on a Tobruk at Saint Aubin's Fort, Jersey.

Some of the turrets removed from the tanks were used on defensive fighting positions known as "Tobruks". This gave the Tobruk enhanced firepower and the gunner protection from shrapnel and small arms.

Fourteen R35 tanks, used to train tank drivers, equipped the 100. Panzer-Ersatz-Bataillon (100th Panzer Replacement Battalion) in the German Seventh Army in 1944. On 6 June 1944, they were among the first Armee-Reserve units sent into combat near Sainte-Mère-Église to oppose the American airborne landings in Normandy. Supporting a counterattack by the 1057th Grenadier Regiment, R35s penetrated the command post of the U.S. 1st Battalion 505th Parachute Infantry Regiment before being destroyed by bazooka fire.

=== Poland ===
As the threat of war became apparent and the production rate of Polish 7TP tank was insufficient, it was decided to buy vehicles abroad. Poles were most interested in French SOMUA S35 tanks, but the proposal was refused by the French government. In 1938 the Polish Army bought one (according to other sources, two or three) R35 tank for testing. After a series of tests, it was found that the design was disappointing: the engine was overheating, the suspension was tough, and armament insufficient. In April 1939, it was finally decided to buy a hundred R35 tanks as an emergency measure. The first shipment of fifty (other sources lower the number to 49) arrived in Poland in July 1939, along with three Hotchkiss H35 tanks bought for testing. In August, they were mostly put into service with the Łuck-based 12th Armoured Battalion. At the beginning of the Invasion of Poland, 45 (or 46) tanks formed the core of the newly created 21st Light Tank Battalion that was part of the general reserve of the Commander in Chief. The unit was to defend the Romanian Bridgehead, but was divided after the Soviet invasion of Poland of 17 September. In late September, the unit was withdrawn to defend the Romanian Bridgehead. Subsequently, 34 tanks were withdrawn to Romania. Six tanks were attached to the 10th Motorized Cavalry Brigade in Stanisławów (today Ivano-Frankivsk); they forced their way through Kolomyia and three vehicles crossed the Hungarian border. The remaining tanks - four R35s and three H35s - were put into service with the improvised Dubno Operational Group and took part in the battles of Krasne on 19 September (with the Soviets) and Kamionka Strumiłowa (with the Germans), during which all were destroyed. The second shipment of R35s did not reach Poland prior to the outbreak of World War II. They were diverted by the French to Syria.

=== Romania ===
As part of a late 1930s rearmament program, Romania sought to obtain a license for the local manufacture of two hundred French Renault R35 infantry tanks. By early 1938, negotiations for establishing a factory for the production of R35 tanks had reached an advanced state. However, by this time, France's own demands for rearmament prohibited further development. In August and September 1939, as a stopgap measure, forty-one R35s were supplied to the Royal Romanian Army. These tanks served as the principal tank of the newly formed 2nd Armoured Regiment. At the end of September 1939, an additional thirty-four brand new R35s passed into Romanian hands when the Polish 21st Light Tank Battalion (Batalion Czołgów Lekkich, or BCL) chose internment over capture following the German conquest of Poland and fled over the Romanian border. With seventy-five tanks on strength, the 2nd Armoured Regiment expanded into two battalions.

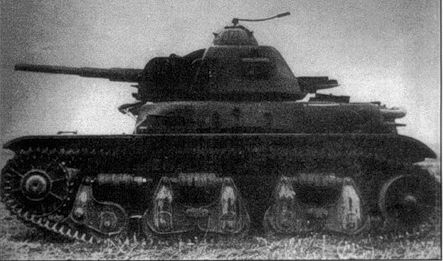
A VDC R35 tank destroyer

After the Battle of Stalingrad, the Romanians decided that the R35s required significant improvement of their anti-tank capacity. At first, the turret of an R35 of the 2nd Tank Regiment of the 1st Tank Division was swapped for the turret of a captured Soviet T-26. Ultimately, at the beginning of 1943, it was decided to keep the thicker armor of the French turret. Thus, the 45 mm gun of the T-26 was adopted as a replacement for the original 37 mm gun. The Soviet gun was attached to the French turret with the help of an extension that contained the recoil mechanism of the 45 mm piece. The downside to this was that, following these modifications, there was no longer enough space in the turret to keep the coaxial machine gun, which was thus removed. A Romanian-produced 47 mm Schneider gun was also proposed. The upgraded tanks were adopted as tank destroyers under the designation Vânătorul de care R35 (VDC 35; meaning "R35 tank hunter"), with thirty R35s converted until June 1944 by the Leonida factory in Bucharest. The Soviet 45 mm guns were taken from captured T-26 and BT-7 tanks. They were refurbished at the Army Arsenal in Târgoviște while the new gun mounts containing the recoil mechanism were made at the Concordia Works in Ploiești.

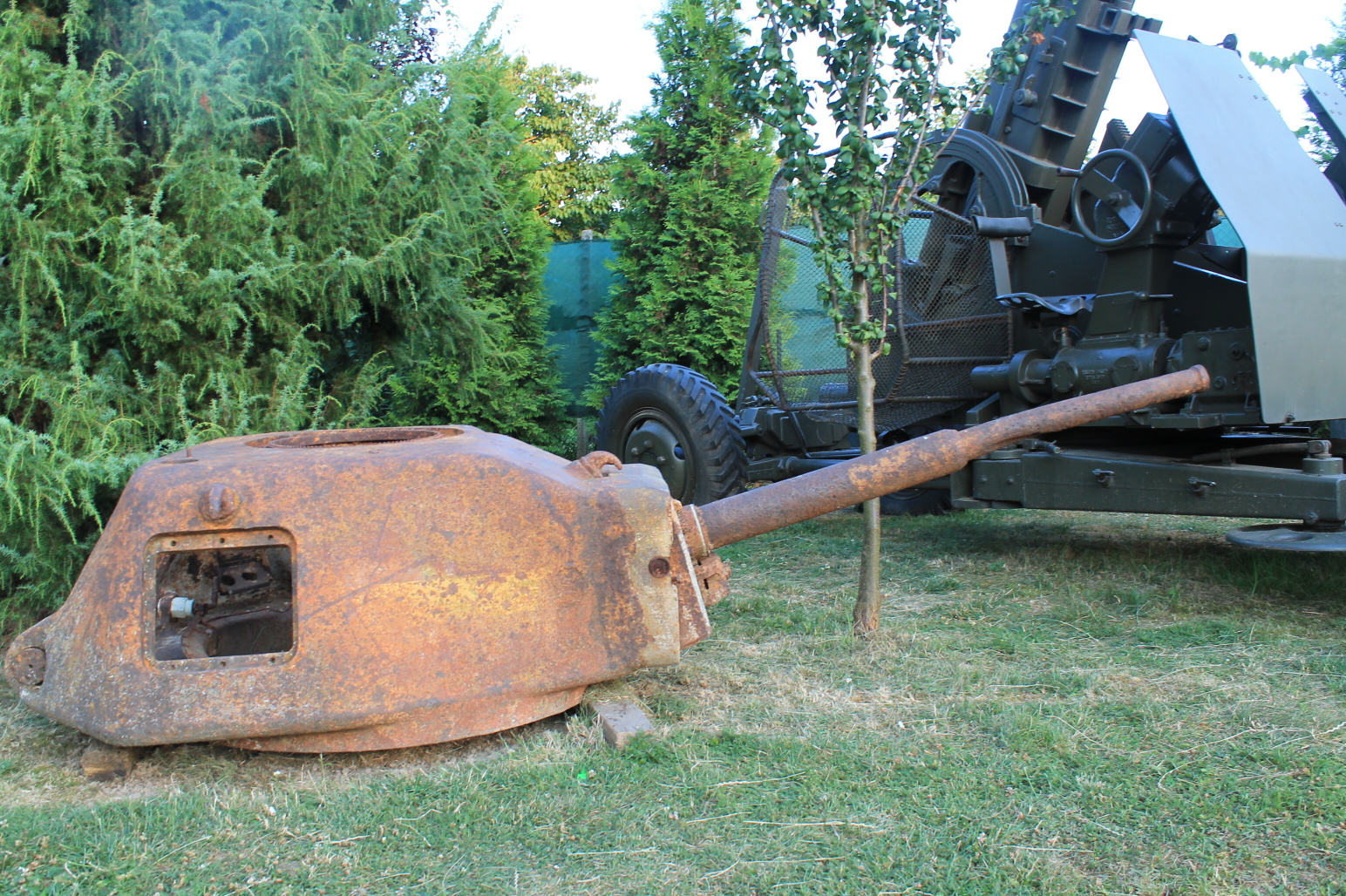
The turret of a VDC R35 on display at Starý Tekov

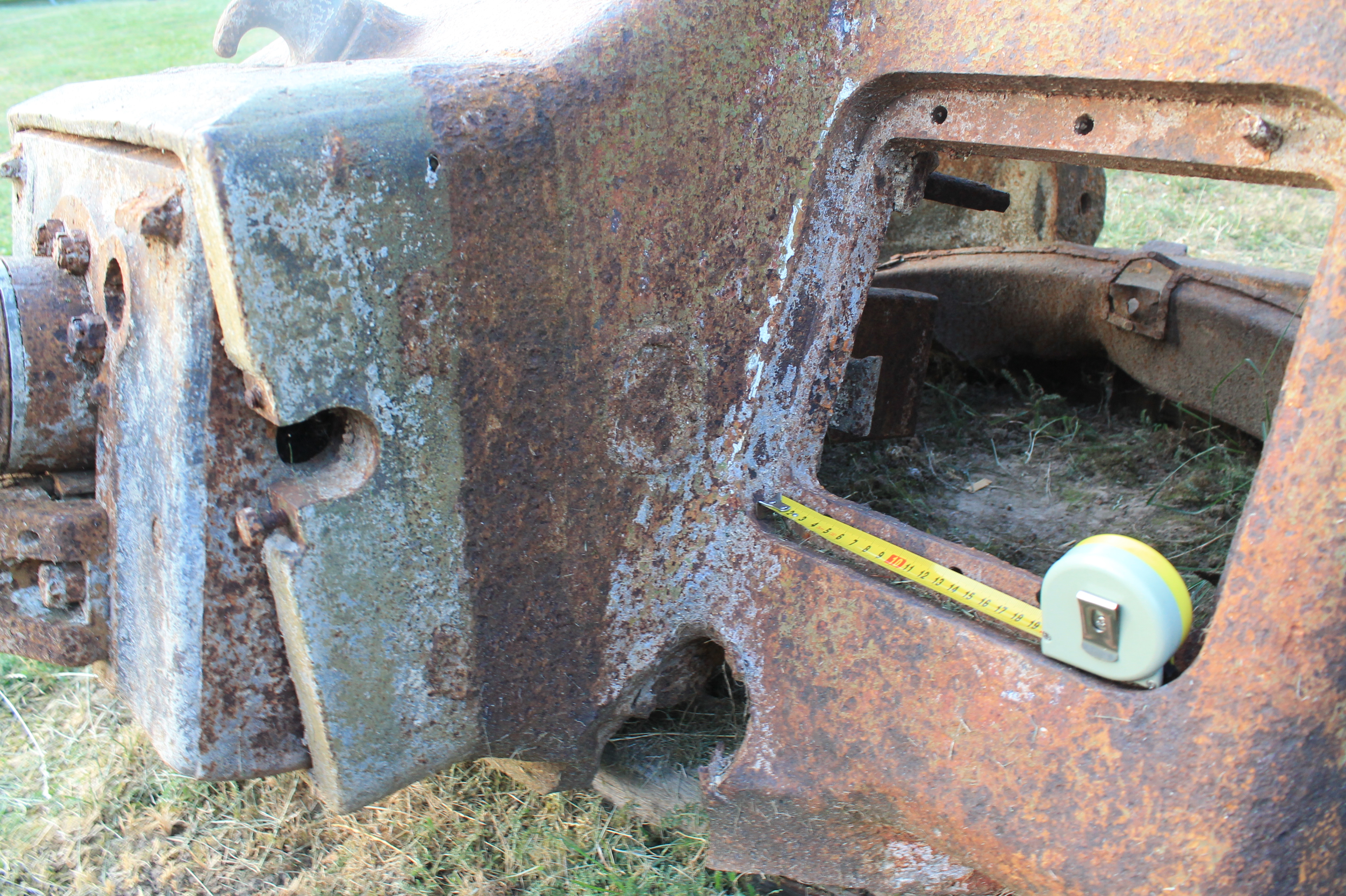
Close-up of the turret showing the damage caused by a penetrating shell at the base

These vehicles served until the end of the war. A significant amount of the original French-made parts, from both the original and converted R35 tanks, was replaced by Romanian-produced spares in 1941–1942. Romanian factories produced drive sprockets, drive shafts, tracks, new metal-rimmed road wheels and cylinder heads. The wheels were designed locally to be ten times more durable. Added to these were the gun mounts for the 45 mm guns, added as turret extensions, which contained the recoil mechanism. Thus, the Romanian-converted R35 had significant Romanian-manufactured parts in its hull, transmission and turret.

There were sixty R35 tanks in the Romanian inventory on 19 July 1944, thirty of which had been rearmed with 45 mm guns.

=== Italy ===
The Royal Italian Army received 124 R35s with which the 4th Tank Infantry Regiment formed two battalions. The two battalions were assigned to the 131st Tank Infantry Regiment, which was deployed in January 1942 to Sicily. There, the regiment's CII Tank Battalion R35 was assigned to the XII Army Corps defending the island's West, while the regimental command and CI Tank Battalion R35 were assigned to the XVI Army Corps defending the island's East. The regiment used some of its R35s in defence of Gela on Sicily against US Rangers. 5th Battalion, East Yorkshire Regiment was attacked by five R35s as it advanced towards Sortino; four were quickly knocked out but the fifth drove right through the battalion and carried on until it was knocked out by a 105 mm self-propelled gun near Floridia.

=== Hungary ===
A smaller Polish force retreated to Hungary from the German and Soviet troops occupying Poland. In addition to thirty tankettes (TK-3 and TKS), this mixed formation also had three R35s. These vehicles were used by Hungary for training in tank driving and machine gun handling drills. By the end of the war, they were worn out due to the lack of spare parts; there is no trace of them after 1944.

=== Other forces during the Second World War ===
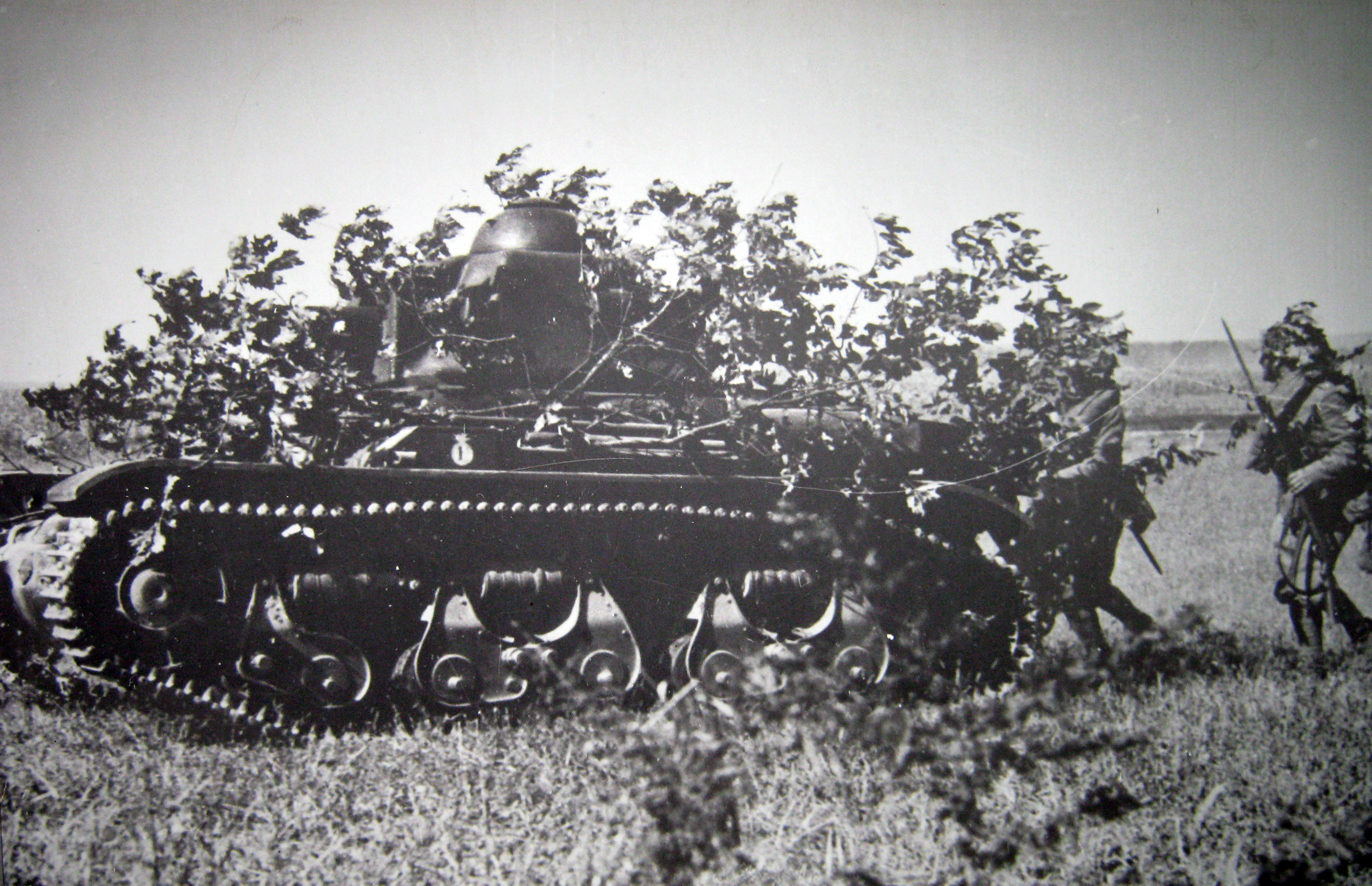
R35 tank participating in large military manoeuvres of the Yugoslav Army at Torlak, 1940

Some of the tanks that Germany captured were given or sold to Germany's allies: Bulgaria received about forty.

During the Syria-Lebanon Campaign, the Australian 2/6th Cavalry Commando Regiment's 'A' Squadron used four R35s that had been captured from the Vichy French.

Switzerland took over twelve R35s that had fled from France.

After the German victory over Yugoslavia in 1941, the Independent State of Croatia took over some R35s that had not been destroyed when fighting 11. Panzerdivision on 13 and 14 April.

=== Syria and Lebanon ===
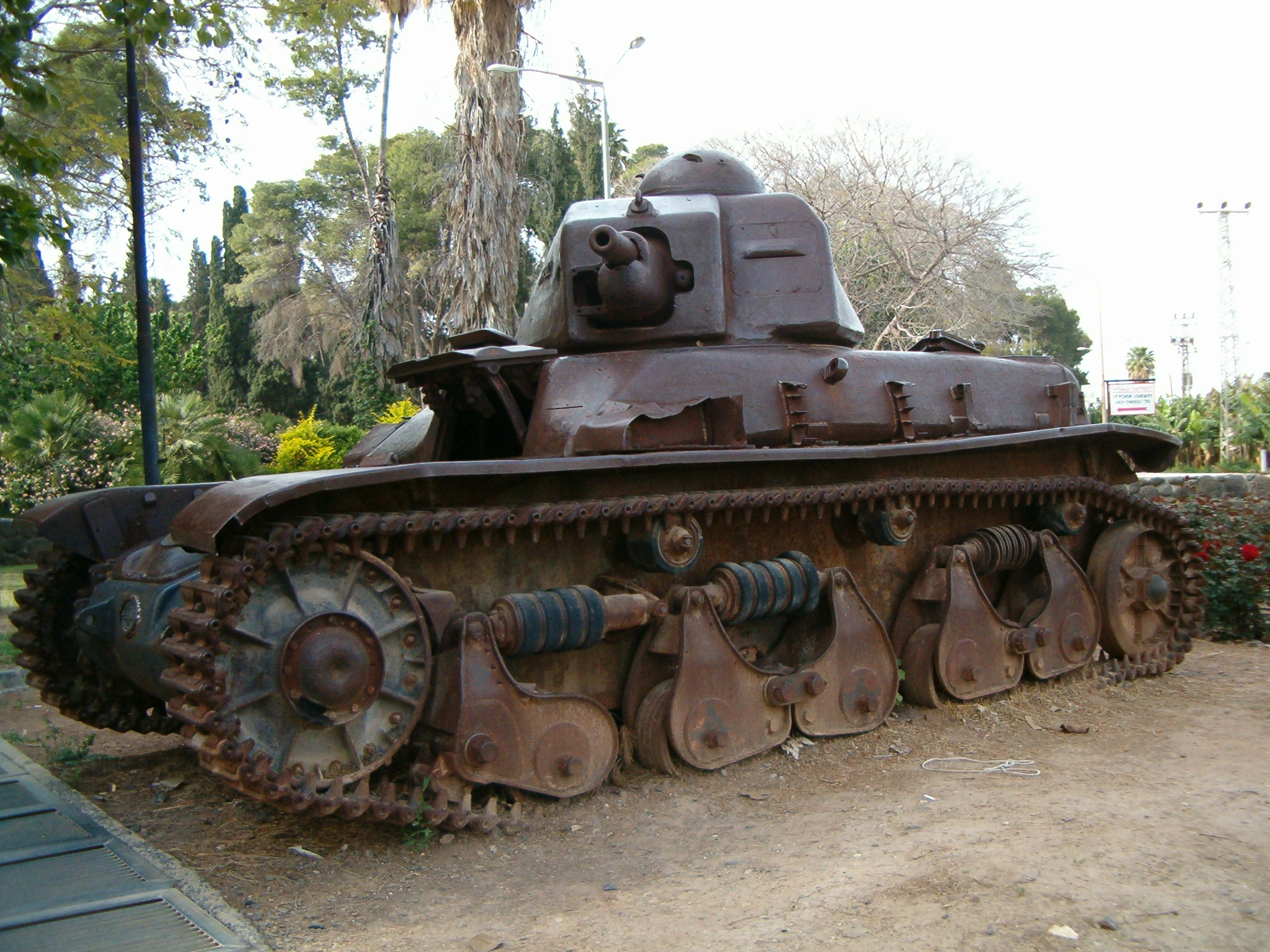
A knocked-out Syrian R-35 at Degania Alef

The R35 saw combat in Syrian hands when five R35s took part in an unsuccessful Syrian Army attack on the Jewish kibbutz Degania Alef in the Galilee on 20 May 1948, during the Battles of the Kinarot Valley. The kibbutz defenders managed to knock out three R35s, causing the remaining forces to retreat. One of the disabled R35s remains near the kibbutz today as a memorial of the 1947–1949 Palestine war. It had been long thought that the defenders had incapacitated it with the help of a 20 mm anti-tank gun and Molotov cocktails; however, a 1991 IDF probe proved that this R35 had been knocked out by a PIAT round.

The Lebanese Army also incorporated a number of R35s. Some of the Lebanese vehicles, which had been rebuilt with a British 40 mm Ordnance QF 2-pounder gun, saw action in the 1958 Lebanon crisis.

== Operators ==
- Australia – Captured from Vichy forces
- Kingdom of Bulgaria
- France
- Nazi Germany – Captured from France
- Kingdom of Hungary
- Israel
- Kingdom of Italy
- Lebanon
- Second Polish Republic
- Kingdom of Romania
- Switzerland
- Syria
- Turkey
- Kingdom of Yugoslavia

== See also ==
- Tanks in France

== Literature ==
- Pascal Danjou, 2005, Renault R35/R40, Editions du Barbotin, Ballainvilliers
