= Hotchkiss H35 =

French cavalry tank

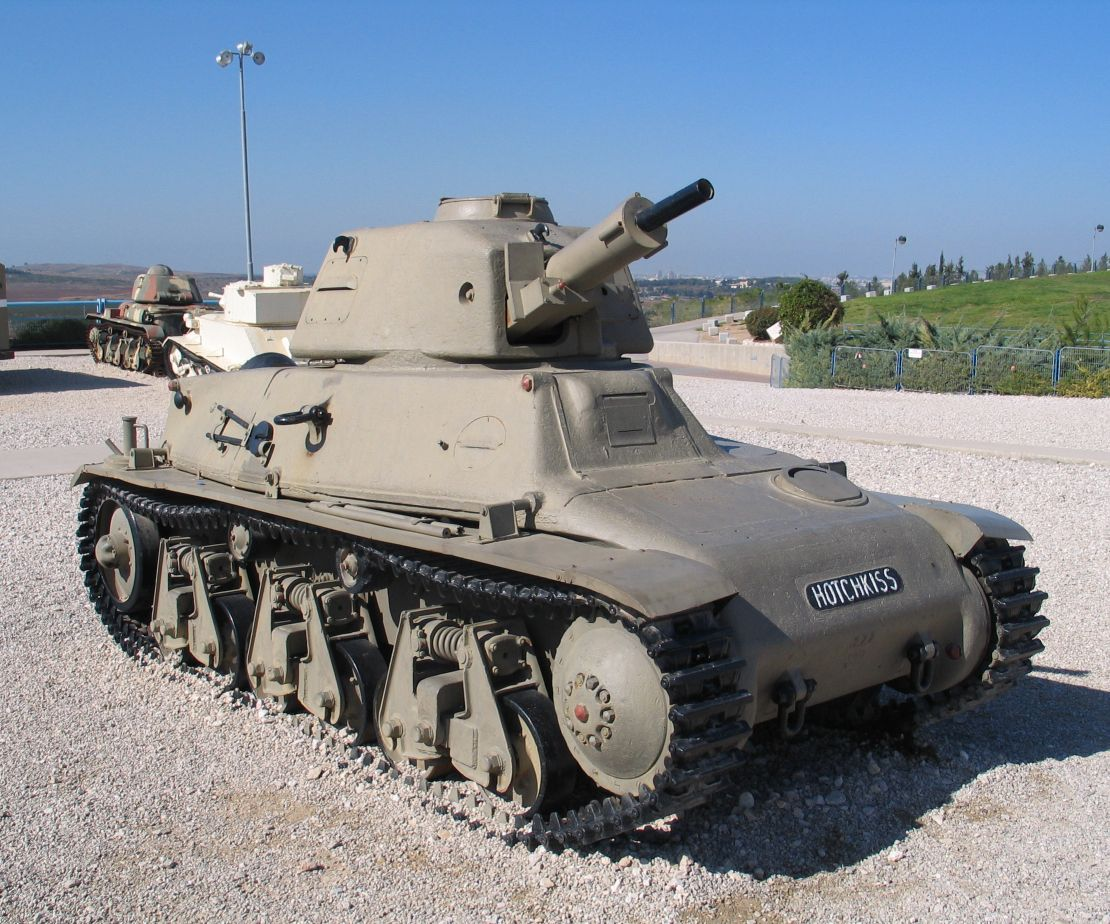
- Char léger modèle 1935 H modifié 39 in Latrun
- Type: Cavalry tank
- Place of origin: France

Service history
- In service: 1936–1952
- Used by: France; Poland; Nazi Germany; Bulgaria; Hungary; Croatia; Yugoslav Partisans; Chetniks; Lebanon; Syria; Israel
- Wars: World War II; 1947–1949 Palestine war First Indochina War

Production history
- Designer: Hotchkiss
- Designed: 1933
- Manufacturer: Hotchkiss et Cie
- Produced: September 1936 – June 1940
- No. built: ±1200
- Variants: Hotchkiss H35 modifié 39

Specifications
- Mass: 11 metric tons
- Length: 4.22 m (13 ft 10 in)
- Width: 1.95 m (6 ft 5 in)
- Height: 2.15 m (7 ft 1 in)
- Crew: 2
- Armour: 40 mm (turret) (45mm on 1939 version); 34 mm (hull) (45mm on 1939 version)
- Main armament: 37 mm SA 18 gun (SA 38 on 1939 version)
- Secondary armament: 7.5 mm MAC31 Reibel machine gun coaxial
- Engine: Hotchkiss six-cylinder 3,480 cc gasoline engine 78 hp
- Power/weight: 7.1 hp/tonne
- Suspension: horizontal helical springs
- Ground clearance: 0.37 m (15 in)
- Fuel capacity: 180 litres
- Operational range: 129 km (80 mi)
- Maximum speed: 28 km/h (17 mph)

The Hotchkiss H35 or Char léger modèle 1935 H was a French cavalry tank developed prior to World War II. Despite having been designed from 1933 as a rather slow but well-armoured light infantry support tank, the type was initially rejected by the French Infantry because steering proved difficult during cross-country use, and was instead adopted in 1936 by the French Cavalry arm.

From 1938 an improved version was produced with a more powerful engine, the Char léger modèle 1935 H modifié 39, which from 1940 was also fitted with a longer, more powerful 37 mm gun. It was intended to make this improved variant the standard light tank, with at least four thousand produced to equip new armoured divisions of both the Cavalry and the Infantry arms, but due to the defeat of France in June 1940, total production of both subtypes was limited to about 1200 vehicles.

For the remainder of the war Germany and its allies used captured Hotchkiss tanks in several modifications.

== Development ==
In 1926, it had been decided to provide armour support to the regular infantry divisions by creating autonomous tank battalions equipped with a light and cheap infantry tank, a char d'accompagnement. For this role at first the Char D1 was developed which type however, proved to be neither particularly light nor cheap. In 1933, the Hotchkiss company under its own initiative presented a plan to produce a lighter design—this was made possible by the application of a new technology to produce cast steel sections to construct an entire hull. On 30 June 1933, this proposal was approved by the Conseil Consultatif de l'Armement. On 2 August 1933 the specifications were issued: a weight of 6 long tons (6.1 t) and 30 mm (1.2 in) armour protection all around. Three prototypes were ordered from Hotchkiss, but the French industry as a whole was also invited to provide alternative proposals for a nouveau char léger.

This allowed the Renault company to beat Hotchkiss in delivering the first prototype, which later was developed into the Renault R35. On 18 January 1935, the first Hotchkiss prototype, not yet made of armour steel, was presented to the Commission d'Expérience du Matériel Automobile (CEMA) at Vincennes; it was a machine gun-armed tankette without turret. It was tested until 4 March 1935, when it was replaced by the second identical prototype to be tested until 6 May. Both had to be rejected because new specifications had been made on 21 June 1934 that increased the desired armour thickness to 40 mm (1.6 in). On 27 June 1935 the commission approved the type on the provision that the necessary changes would be made. On 19 August the third prototype was delivered, equipped with a cast APX turret and featuring a redesigned hull; it was tested until 20 September and accepted.

On 6 November 1935 a first order was made for 200 vehicles. Though it should have been completed between July 1936 and July 1937, the first production vehicle was in fact delivered on 12 September 1936. A first additional order had already been made of 92 on 7 September 1936, to be completed in November 1937. A third one of 108 vehicles followed on 23 January 1937, to be completed in September 1938. These vehicles had the series number 40000 to 40400. By 1 January 1937 132 hulls had been produced. None of these had at that date been fitted with a turret.

== Rejection by the Infantry and adoption by the Cavalry ==
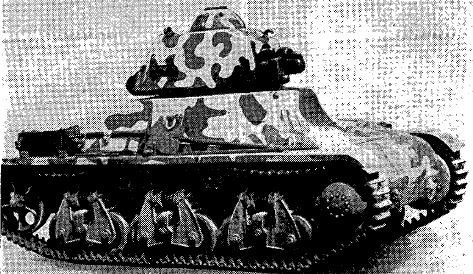
A Hotchkiss H35 at an unknown date.

The first series vehicle was again extensively and intensively tested until 4 December 1936. The testing soon showed that its cross-country handling qualities were unacceptably poor; it proved impossible to safely steer the vehicle on an uneven surface, posing an extreme danger to nearby friendly infantry. The Infantry therefore initially rejected any further procurement. Eventually, in 1937, it decided to accept only the last hundred tanks to equip just two battalions with the type: the 13e and 38e Bataillon de Chars de Combat.

For political reasons however, stopping production of the tank was unacceptable. As a result, the first three hundred vehicles of the production run were offered to the Cavalry, which was forced to accept them because it would not have been granted a budget for other tanks anyway. As the cavalry units would be making more use of the road network and of mounted infantry, its cross-country handling problem was of less consequence. The H35 was, at 28 km/h (17 mph), also somewhat faster than the Renault R35, which was capable of 20 km/h (12 mph), although in practice its average speed was lower than that of the R 35 because of its inferior gear box.

== Description ==
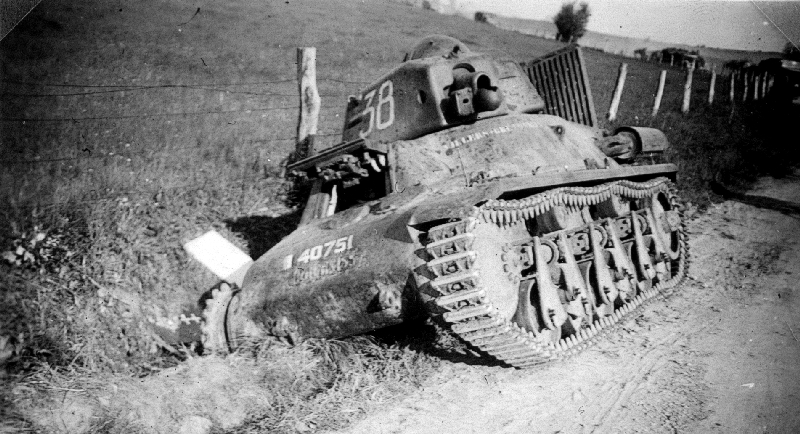
An abandoned Hotchkiss modifié H39 in 1940

The Hotchkiss H35 was 4.22 m (13 ft 10 in) long, 1.95 m (6 ft 5 in) wide and 2.13 m (7 ft 0 in) tall and weighing 10.6–11.4 t (10.4–11.2 long tons). The hull consisted of six cast armour sections, bolted together: the engine deck, the fighting compartment, the front of the hull, the back of the hull and two longitudinal sections left and right forming the bottom. The hull was made water-tight by cementing these sections together with Aslic, a product based on tar mixed with lime. The casting allowed for sloped armour, avoiding shot traps, to optimise the chance of deflection but the protection levels did not satisfy the Infantry. Maximum armour thickness was not the specified 40 mm (1.6 in) but 34 mm (1.3 in). There were persistent quality problems, worsened by the fact that many subcontractors had to be used: at first the armour was made much too soft; when hardness was increased it became brittle and full of bubbles and hence weak spots.

There was a crew of two. The driver sat at the right front, behind a large cast double hatch and next to the combined gearbox and steering unit. Behind him was a round escape hatch in the bottom of the hull. Driving the vehicle was very hard work. The Hotchkiss lacked the Cleveland differential ("Cletrac") of its Renault competitor, and it responded unpredictably to changes of direction. The brakes could not sufficiently compensate for this, being too weak, especially when driving down-slope. No less troublesome was the gearbox: it was difficult to engage the highest fifth gear and so the theoretical top speed of 28 km/h (17 mph) was rarely reached. There was one reverse gear. The inevitable rough handling of the tank by the driver resulted in much wear and tear. Mechanical reliability was poor.

The suspension consisted of three bogies per side—each formed of two bell cranks arranged as "scissors" with springs at the top. Each bogie carried two rubber-rimmed wheels. The first ten production vehicles, which can be considered as forming a separate pre-series, had curved bogie sides; in later vehicles the bogies had straight sides. The bogies superficially resembled the R35 type, but used horizontal helical springs instead of rubber cylinders. The sprocket was at the front, the idler—which itself was sprung to automatically control tension—at the rear. There were two top rollers.

The rear of the hull formed an engine room, separated from the fighting compartment by a fireproof bulkhead. The tank was powered by a 78 hp six-cylinder 86 x 100 3485 cc engine which was on the left of the engine compartment. A 160-litre fuel tank on the right, combined with a twenty litres reserve reservoir, gave a range of 129 km (80 mi) or eight hours on a varied terrain. The engine was cooled by a centrifugal pump. Also a cooling fan drew air through the radiator and was also expected to cool the fuel tank. The trench-crossing capacity was 1.8 m (5 ft 11 in), the wading capacity 0.85 m (2 ft 9 in). On hard soil a slope of 75 percent could be climbed, on soft soil of 55 percent. Maximum tilt was 50 percent. Ground clearance was 37 cm (15 in).

The APX-R turret was the same standard type as used on the R35 and R40 tanks, made of 40 mm (1.6 in) cast steel and armed with the short 37 mm SA 18 gun, which had a maximum armour penetration of only 23 mm (0.91 in). Traverse of the turret was with a handwheel. The commander sat in a saddle suspended from the turret.

The tank carried about 100 rounds for the gun, and 2,400 rounds for the coaxial 7.5 mm Reibel machine gun – the 37 mm ammunition was racked on the left hand side of the hull, the 7.5 mm ammunition on the right side in fifteen circular magazines with 150 rounds each; with usually an additional magazine on the machine-gun itself. The turret had a rotating cupola with a PPL RX 180 P visor but there was no hatch in the cupola though its top could be lifted a bit for better ventilation. Apart from the cupola there were protected vision devices, a binocular periscope and diascopes, to the front beside the gun and to each side. For access there was a hatch at the back of the turret. When opened, the commander could sit on it for better observation, but this left him very vulnerable and slow to reach the gun. The alternative was to fight closed-up, observing through the vertical slits or the visor of the hatchless cupola. The Cavalry liked neither this arrangement nor the weak gun. The latter problem was lessened by enlarging the breech so that special rounds with a larger charge could be used. This increased muzzle velocity to about 600 m/s (2,000 ft/s) and maximum penetration to about 30 mm (1.2 in). Only a small number of the tanks, and limited to the Cavalry, were modified however, because it greatly increased barrel wear. In the spring of 1940 the original diascopes of the Chrétien type were gradually replaced with episcopes, offering more protection.

== The Char léger modèle 1935 H modifié 39 ==
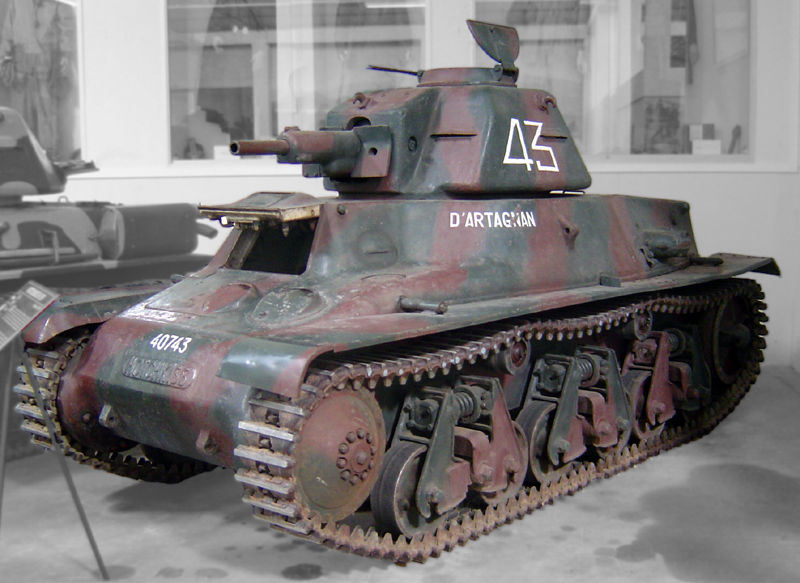
A modifié H39 at Saumur; this vehicle has been modified by the Germans who fitted a cupola hatch

As the Cavalry wanted an even higher top speed, it was decided to bring to fruition experiments already conducted from October 1936 to install a more powerful engine. A new prototype was built in 1937, with a 120 hp engine instead of the 78 hp one. The hull was enlarged, giving it a higher almost level engine deck, to accommodate it. The track and the suspension elements were improved, raising the weight to 12.1 t (11.9 long tons). This improved type was faster, with a top speed of 36.5 km/h (22.7 mph), but also proved much easier to drive. As this removed one of the objections of the Infantry, it was first presented to the Commission d'Expérimentations de l'Infanterie on 31 January 1939 to see whether the original negative decision could be changed. The commission indeed accepted the type, the Char léger modèle 1935 H modifié 39; and it was decided on 18 February to let it succeed the original version from the 401st vehicle onwards, which was just as well as both in 1937 and 1938 an order had been made of two hundred vehicles and production had already started, the total orders of the improved type thereafter being expanded to nine hundred. The factory identifier however, was Char léger Hotchkiss modèle 38 série D, its predecessor having been the série B. The factory designation has caused much confusion; this was still officially the same tank as the H35, only in a later variant; even at the time, many began to refer to it as the 38 H or the 39 H.

The new subtype differed from the original one in having a raised and more angular engine deck (in later production vehicles with crosswise instead of longitudinal ventilation slits on the right side); a range decreased to 120 km (75 mi); closed idler wheels; tracks 2 cm (0.79 in) wider at 27 cm (11 in); metal instead of rubber wheel treads; a new exhaust silencer directed to the back and larger, more reliable and effective ventilators.

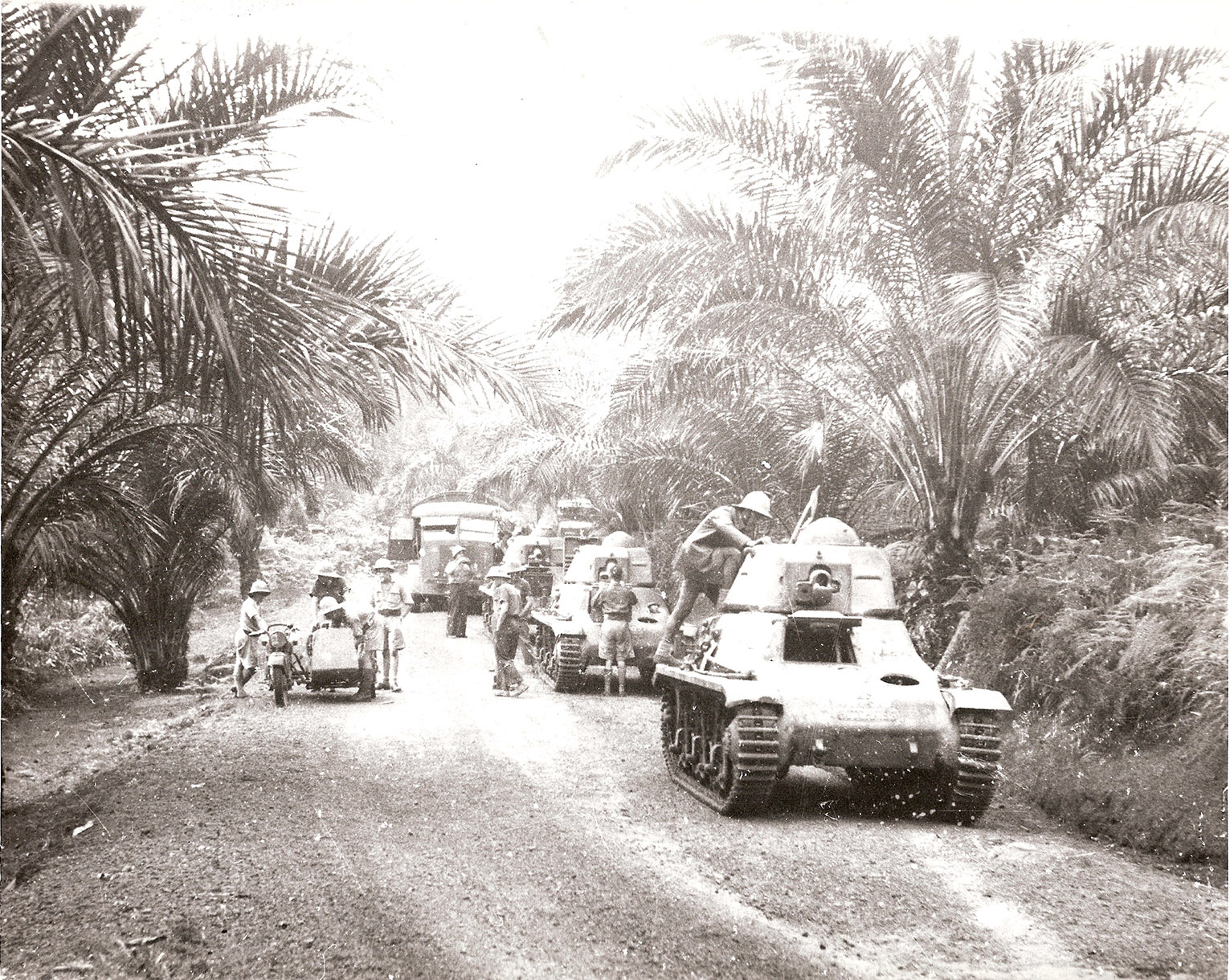
Free French modifié H39s during the Battle of Gabon.

A modernisation programme was initiated in early 1940. Besides the fitting of episcopes, tails and some radio sets, this included the gradual introduction of a longer L/35 37 mm SA 38 gun with a much improved anti-tank capability which gave 30 mm (1.2 in) penetration at 1 km (0.62 mi)); about 350 vehicles were (re)built with the better gun, among them about fifty H35s. The new gun became standard on the production lines in April. Before that, the trickle of longer guns becoming available had, from January 1940, gradually been fitted to the tanks of platoon, company and battalion commanders; about half of the commander vehicles in Hotchkiss units were modified in this way. It had been intended to fit the longer gun to all vehicles during the second half of 1940. After the war it was wrongly assumed for a time that H38 was the official name of the tank with the new engine but without the new gun and that H39 was the name of the type that had both major improvements. H38 however, in contemporary use indicated the same type as H39 and it is only possible to refer to the latter with historical accuracy in an informal sense.

Parallel to the development of a R40 it was, for a time, considered to create an H40 by adopting the improved AMX suspension of the other vehicle; but this option was ultimately rejected.

== Operational history ==
=== France ===
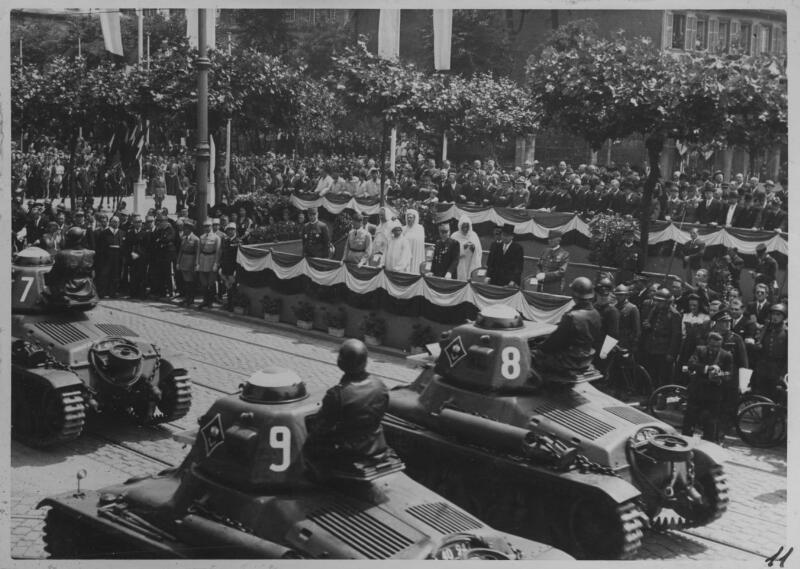
H35s on parade in Strasbourg in July 1939

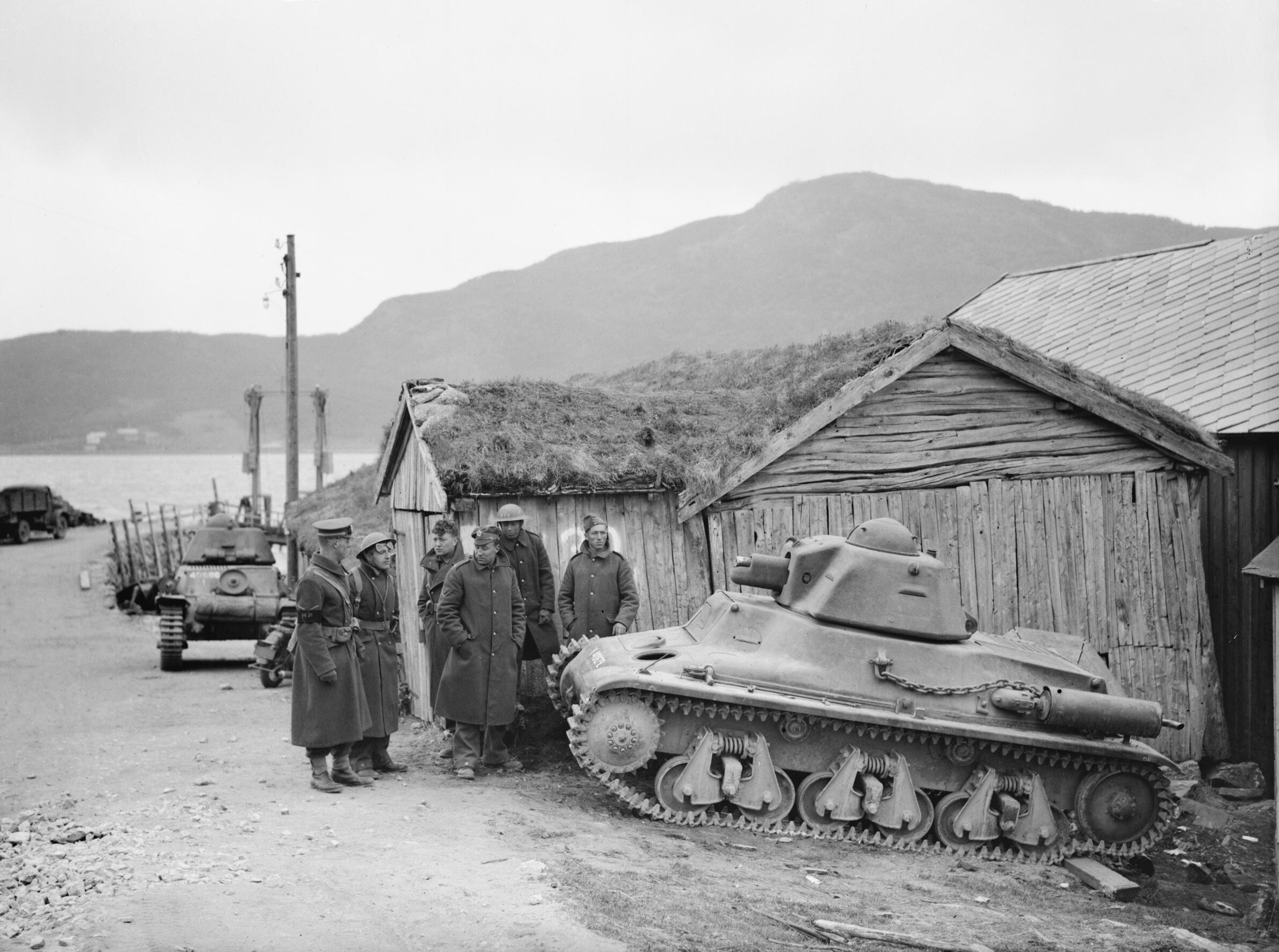
British troops with French Hotchkiss H39 tanks in Steinland, Norway, 1940

In the Cavalry arm, the main user at first, the Hotchkiss tanks replaced as main combat tanks the light AMR 33 and AMR 35 vehicles, that for want of a better type had been used to form the bulk of the first two Cavalry armoured divisions. As the new medium SOMUA S35 was initially produced in very limited numbers, until early 1939 the Hotchkiss equipped three of the four divisional tank regiments.

In April 1940 the 342e CACC (Compagnie Autonome de Chars de Combat or "Independent Tank Company") was sent to Norway after Operation Weserübung, the German invasion of that country, having first been intended to form part of an expeditionary force to assist Finland in the Winter War. This autonomous company, equipped with fifteen H39s, all with short guns, fought in the later phase of the Battles of Narvik, after having landed on 7 May. After the temporary liberation of that city, the twelve remaining vehicles were withdrawn to Britain on 8 June, where they joined the Free French, forming the 1e Compagnie de Chars de Combat de la France Libre. This was an exception in June 1940, with most units returning to France. In 1940 and 1941 this 1e CCC fought against Vichy troops in the Battle of Gabon and later in Syria.

According to the official army acceptance lists, at the start of World War II 640 Hotchkiss tanks had been delivered. The inventories deviate slightly: of the 300 H35s allocated to the Cavalry, 232 were fielded by ten cavalry squadrons, 44 were in depot, eight in factory overhaul and sixteen in North Africa. Of the hundred used by the Infantry, ninety were fielded by the two tank battalions equipped with the type, six were in matériel reserve and two used for driving training. Of the H39s, sixteen were used by the Cavalry in North Africa and six in depot; 180 were fielded by four Infantry tank battalions and fourteen were in the Infantry matériel reserve. It was decided to concentrate most Allied production capacity for light tanks into the manufacture of a single type, and the Hotchkiss tank was chosen as it had the necessary mobility to be of use in the many armoured divisions the Entente planned to raise for the expected decisive summer offensive of 1941. To this end British and Portuguese heavy industry had to assist in producing the cast armour sections. It was hoped to increase production to 300 a month in October 1940, and even 500 a month from March 1941, the sections of 75 of which to be provided by Britain in exchange for a monthly delivery of nine Char B1s. This can be compared to the planned production of the R40: 120 per month, reflecting the little importance now attached to infantry support.

These plans were disrupted by the Battle of France. In May 1940 the type equipped in the Cavalry units two tank regiments (of 47) in each of the three Mechanised Light Divisions and served as AMR in the 9th and 25th Mechanised Infantry Division (sixteen vehicles for each), 3rd DLM (22 H35s and 47 H39s) and in three of the five Cavalry Light Divisions (sixteen vehicles each for the 1re, 2e and 3e DLC). Furthermore, sixteen vehicles were part of the 1er RCA in Morocco. In the Infantry it equipped the two autonomous battalions mentioned above and two battalions of 45 in each of the three Divisions Cuirassées, the latter with the H39 variant. Most Hotchkiss tanks were thus concentrated in larger motorised units, in the armoured divisions supplementing the core of heavier tanks, though they were mismatched: the slower H35s fought alongside the swifter SOMUA S35s, whereas the faster H39s joined the slow Char B1s. The vast majority of these vehicles still had the short gun. Several ad hoc and reconstituted units were formed with the type after the invasion. These included 4e DCR (forty vehicles) and 7e DLM (47). Most of these later units were equipped with new vehicles built with the long gun, but 7e DLM also deployed twenty-two old H35s in its 8e dragons-chars. In May deliveries peaked at 122; a recently discovered picture of a Hotchkiss tank with series number 41200 indicates that in June at least 121 were produced for a total of at least 1,200 vehicles, not including prototypes.

=== Germany ===
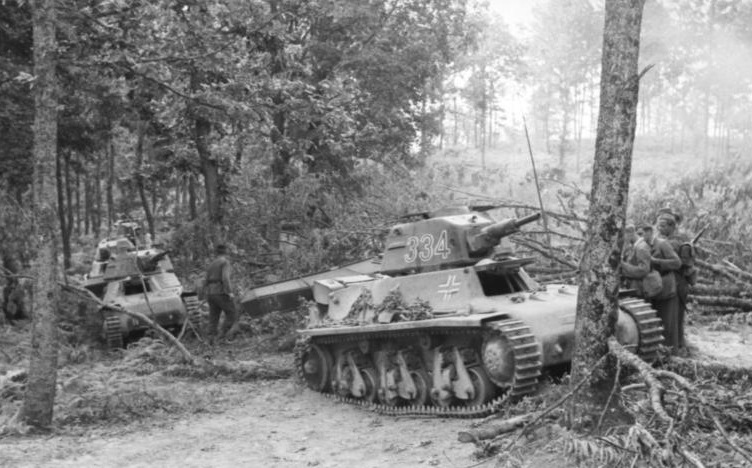
A pair of Panzerkampfwagen 38H 735(f) used by the Germans in Yugoslavia, 1941

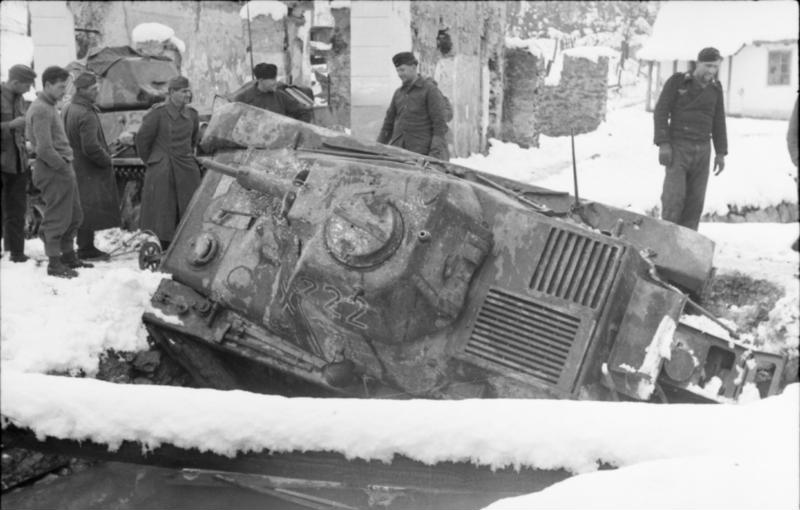
Overturned Panzerkampfwagen 38H 735(f) in Yugoslavia, 1942

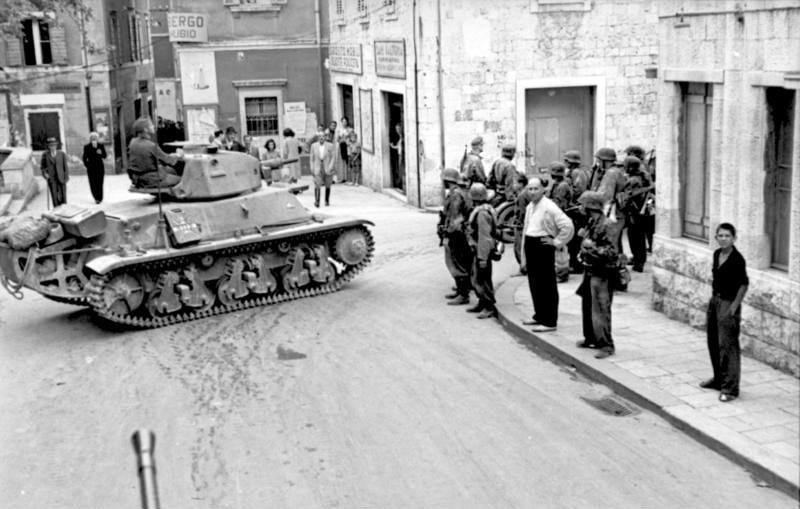
A Hotchkiss used by the Germans in Split, Yugoslavia, 1943

About 550 Hotchkiss tanks were captured and used by the Germans as Panzerkampfwagen 35H 734(f) or Panzerkampfwagen 38H 735(f); most for occupation duty. Like the French, the Germans made no clear distinction between a H38 and a H39; and fitted many with a cupola with a hatch.

==== Eastern Front ====
Panzer-Abteilung 211 was deployed in Finland during Operation Barbarossa, equipped with Hotchkiss tanks. In 1944, three of its vehicles were converted to 7.5 cm self-propelled guns.

Additional vehicles were sent to Finland as part of the independent Panzerkampfwagenzüge (tank platoons) 217, 218 and 219, which were attached to the 20th Mountain Army in February 1942. The platoons were the same as those of Panzerabteilung 211, consisting of one SOMUA S35 and four Hotchkiss tanks. They were later disbanded, with the tanks being dispersed for use as fortifications and the crews used to form two batteries of Stug III Gs (741 and 742).

==== Balkans ====
German H35/39s also saw action in Yugoslavia with 7.SS-Freiwilligen-Gebirgs-Division "Prinz Eugen", 12. Panzer-Kompanie z.b.V. and I./Panzer-Regiment 202. Tanks used in France for various training and security units also got caught in the fighting in Normandy, such as Panzer Abteilung 206, Panzer –Ersatz und Ausb. Abt. 100, and 200. Beute-Sturmgeschütz-Abteilung.

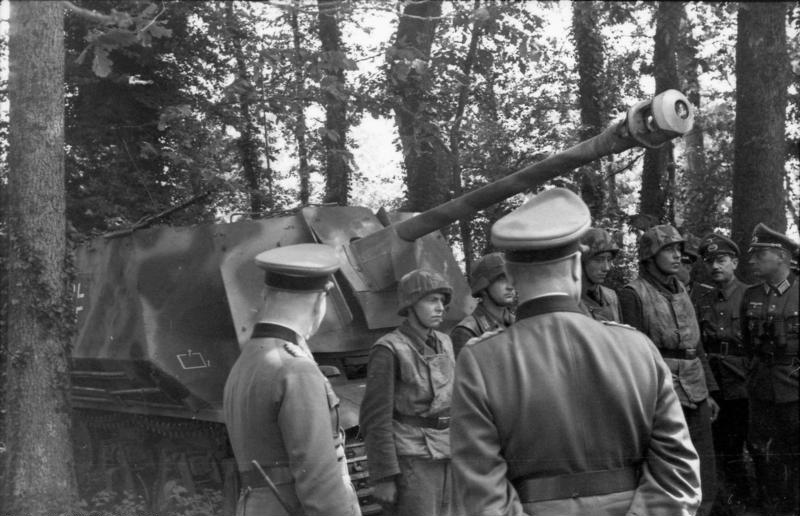
Rommel in 1944 inspecting a 7,5 cm PaK40(Sf) auf Geschützwagen 39H(f) used by 21. Panzerdivision

==== Western Front ====
In 1942 a project was launched to make use of French equipment as carrier platforms for heavier guns, directed by Major Alfred Becker, an artillery officer who was a mechanical engineer by trade. He had experience making similar conversions with captured Belgian and British vehicles. His unit in Paris converted 24 Hotchkiss tanks in 1942 into the Marder I Panzerjäger (self-propelled anti-tank artillery), the 7,5 cm PaK40(Sf) auf Geschützwagen 39H(f), and 48 into self-propelled artillery with the 10.5 cm leFH 18 as the 10,5 cm leFH18(Sf) auf Geschützwagen 39H(f), all to be used by units in France. Some vehicles were modified into munition carriers or artillery tractors (Artillerieschlepper 38H(f)) or rocket-launchers (Panzerkampfwagen 35H(f) mit 28/32 cm Wurfrahmen). A special artillery observation vehicle created, was the Panzerbeobachtungswagen 38H (f). In June 1943, 361 Hotchkiss tanks were still listed in the German Army inventories as 37 mm gun tanks; this number had decreased to sixty in December 1944.

=== Other countries ===
==== Poland ====
Three Hotchkiss H39 tanks had been exported by France to Poland in July 1939 for testing by the Polish Bureau of Technical Studies of Armoured Weapons (Polish: Biuro Badań Technicznych Broni Pancernych) with a view to a larger purchase. During the German invasion of Poland in 1939 the Hotchkiss tanks, together with three Renault R 35 tanks, were organised into an ad hoc "half company" unit under lieutenant J. Jakubowicz, formed on 14 September 1939 in Kiwerce, Poland. The unit joined the "Dubno" task force and lost all of its tanks during the marches and fighting against German and Soviet armies, largely due to fuel shortages.

==== Turkey ====
Two vehicles were exported by France to Turkey in February 1940.

==== Bulgaria ====
In 1943 the Germans, against objections, delivered nineteen H39s to Bulgaria for training purposes, when it proved to be impossible to find 25 unmodified Panzer I light tanks, the type the Bulgarians really desired. After the war these vehicles were used by police units.

==== Croatia ====
In 1942, the Germans delivered a small number to the Croatian Home Guard.

==== Hungary ====
In October 1942, the Hungarian Army received fifteen Hotchkiss H39 tanks, which formed the bulk of the 101st Independent Tank Company, which was used in the counter-partisan role. The unit operated in Ukraine, Belarus and Poland and was finally disbanded after losing 30% of its tanks to enemy action and having to destroy the rest due to lack of fuel and spares. The unit returned to Hungary from Warsaw in September–October 1944.

=== Vichy France ===
In North Africa, 27 vehicles (thirteen H35 and fourteen H39) were officially serving in the 1e Régiment de Chasseurs d'Afrique and were allowed to remain there under the armistice conditions; another five were hidden in Morocco. They fought the Allies during the opening stages of Operation Torch, the Allied invasion of French North Africa, near Casablanca in November 1942, destroying three M3 Stuart light tanks. The regiment subsequently joined the Allies and was re-equipped with M4 Sherman medium tanks in summer 1943.

=== Postwar ===
After the war, some Hotchkiss tanks were used by French security forces in the colonies, such as French Indochina, and occupation forces in Germany. Ten H39s were clandestinely sold to Israel – they were shipped from Marseille to Haifa in 1948 for service with the Israel Defense Forces during the 1948 Arab-Israeli War. At least one remained in service with the IDF until 1952.

== Surviving vehicles ==
One Hotchkiss H35 and nine Hotchkiss H35s modifié 39 have survived to this present day, all of the modifié 39 were further modified by the Germans during World War II.

The sole surviving unmodified Hotchkiss H35 was discovered in December 2008, 200 meters off the coast, at Sainte-Cecile beach, Camiers, Pas-de-Calais, France. It is a turretless chassis, probably a remnant of the Dunkerque gap fighting in May–June 1940. The tank was dredged in late 2008 at low tide. The Musée des Blindés at Saumur plans to recover this tank for display in the museum, but its recovery has proved very difficult and costly.

One Hotchkiss H35 modifié 39 tank is on display at the Narvik War Museum in Narvik as a memorial of Battle of Narvik in 1940. A second vehicle in Norway is part of the collection of the Panserparken at the camp Rena leir. In England the private The Wheatcroft Collection bought a vehicle from the Norwegian Arquebus Krigshistoriske Museum at Rogaland. In France itself the Musée des Blindés at Saumur has a vehicle in a running condition; at the base of 501/503e RCC at Mourmelon-le-Grand a Hotchkiss serves as a monument restored with a Renault R35 turret, fitted with a dummy gun. Another tank is displayed at Užice, in Serbia. The Bulgarian National Museum of Military History displays one of the vehicles used by the Bulgarian police forces. In Latrun, the Yad la-Shiryon Museum shows one of the tanks used by the IDF. In Russia, the Kubinka tank museum has a Hotchkiss tank which was captured from 211. Panzerabteilung in the summer of 1944.
