= AMR 33 =

French light cavalry tank

Renault AMR 33
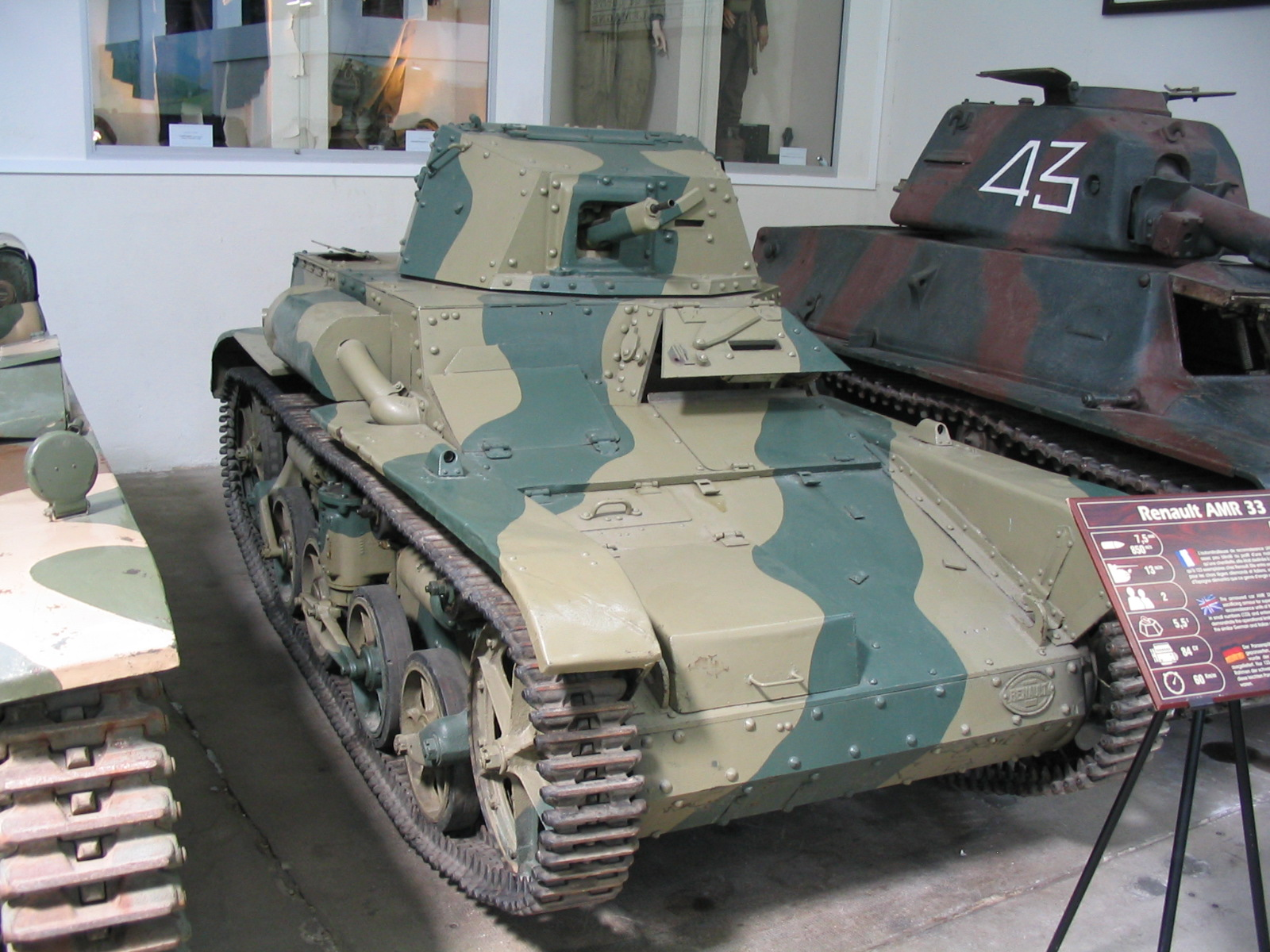
- AMR 33 at Musée des Blindés
- Type: Light cavalry tank
- Place of origin: France

Service history
- Used by: France; Nazi Germany; China

Production history
- Designer: Renault
- Designed: 1932
- Manufacturer: Renault
- Produced: 1933 - 1935
- No. built: 123
- Variants: AMR 33 TSF, AMR-ZB

Specifications
- Mass: 5.5 t (12,000 lb; 5.4 long tons)
- Length: 3.5 m (11 ft 6 in)
- Width: 1.64 m (5 ft 5 in)
- Height: 1.73 m (5 ft 8 in)
- Crew: 2
- Armour: 13 mm (0.51 in)
- Main armament: 7.5 mm Mitrailleuse mle 1931
- Secondary armament: reserve gun could be used as anti-aircraft weapon
- Engine: 8-cylinder petrol 84 hp (63 kW)
- Suspension: oil damped horizontal springs
- Ground clearance: 32 cm (13 in)
- Fuel capacity: 128 L (28 imp gal)
- Operational range: about 200 km (120 mi)
- Maximum speed: 54 km/h (34 mph)

The Automitrailleuse de Reconnaissance Renault Modèle 1933 (AMR 33 or Renault VM) was a French light cavalry tank developed during the Interbellum and used in the Second World War.

Developed by Renault from 1932, the type was ordered by the French Cavalry in 1933; a total of 123 would be built until 1935. The AMR 33 was lightly armed and armoured; though it was very fast for its day, it proved to be a mechanically unreliable vehicle, especially its suspension elements being too weak. It was therefore succeeded by an improved type, the AMR 35.

Though its name might suggest otherwise, the AMR 33 was not a scout vehicle and mostly was not equipped with a radio set. The AMR 33s were intended to form a large mass of light tanks, preceding the medium types into battle. In reality, they never served as such; by the time enough medium tanks were produced to form armoured divisions, the AMR 33 had already been replaced by the AMR 35 and was limited to the Cavalry Divisions and in 1940 to the Cavalry Light Divisions to provide fire support to motorised infantry and dismounted cavalry. In the 1940 Battle of France, the AMR 33s were quickly lost. Some captured vehicles were used by Germany for the duration of the war.

== Development ==
To counter the threat posed by the massive Soviet arms build-up since 1928, the year Joseph Stalin took power, on 4 July 1930, the French government conceived the plan to form a projection force capable of assisting its allies in the Cordon sanitaire. This force would have to consist of five motorised infantry divisions and the five existing cavalry divisions, one brigade of each would have to be motorised. The plan called for the introduction of many specialised vehicles, among which was an Automitrailleuse de Cavalerie type Reconnaissance (AMR), specified on 16 January 1932 as a vehicle of three tons, armed with a light 7.5 mm machine gun and having a range of 200 kilometres. It should have a crew of two, have an average terrain speed of 35 km/h and an armour base of 9 mm. Automitrailleuse was then the generalised term for any light armoured fighting vehicle armed with a machine gun. At the time, the Cavalry only used wheeled vehicles as tanks were too slow but the designation remained when tracked vehicles entered service, as the official policy was to allocate tanks (Chars) to the Infantry. Although the name might suggest otherwise, an AMR was not a specialised reconnaissance vehicle but a skirmisher without a radio. The gathering and reporting of information was the task of an AMD (Automitrailleuse de Découverte).

In anticipation, in early November 1931, Louis Renault had already begun to design a tracteur léger de cavalerie type VM based on his Renault UE tractor. On 12 November, the first drawings were examined and rejected because the vehicle in its proposed form was much too cramped. A larger hull was clearly necessary but Renault was hesitant to invest in it without the prospect of a possible order. On 21 November, he was asked by the Section Technique de la Cavalerie to provide a tankette version of his Renault UE to test the feasibility of a tracked AMR-concept. Being hereby informed of the general outlines of the specifications, on 22 December, he sent a representative to supreme commander Maxime Weygand to lobby for a Renault AMR. Weygand informed him that it had informally been decided to procure the AMR Citroën Kégresse P 28, a half-track made by Renault's competitor Citroën. However, after much deliberation, the General that very day committed himself to take a Renault tank into consideration.

That commitment being secured, Renault hastily designed a larger model, a wooden mock-up of which was presented in March 1932. Based on it, an order was made on 20 April for five prototypes for a price of 171,250 FF per vehicle, to be delivered in September before the start of the autumn Champagne manoeuvres. The Cavalry saw this as a pre-series to obtain a platoon to be used for its very first trials with a mechanised unit. However, Renault decided to provide each with a different suspension type, to lower the risk that his design would be found wanting. All were generally based on the Carden Loyd type that Renault had simply copied for his Renault UE – without paying any licence rights – and used the standard Renault Reinastella engine. As there simply wasn't time to fully develop all types before the autumn, in July the five vehicles, with military registration numbers 79756 to 79760, were delivered with the simplest one: two leaf springs on each side didn't spring the suspension units, they were the suspension units. In September, the tanks were united in the first French Cavalry mechanised unit ever: the experimental Détachement Mécanique de Sûreté. The experience showed that they were very agile, but also noisy, poorly balanced and lacking sufficient range; unsurprisingly, the crew was always in for a bumpy ride.

After the exercise, they were sent back to Renault, who shortly afterwards submitted three types for evaluation to the Commission d'Expériences du Matériel Automobile at Vincennes: prototype 79758, still with the original suspension, 79759 with added internal hydraulic dampers and 79760 with a fully new suspension consisting of a central bogie with a leaf spring and wheels at the front and the back connected to two horizontal helical springs. In November and December 1932, the "Commission de Vincennes" tested them, using as reference changed specifications determined on 10 June 1932. They were found to have a sufficient speed (56.25 – 60 km/h), but an insufficient range of 166 - 188 kilometres and to be too heavy with a weight of 4.8 tons. On 8 December, it was decided to abandon the unrealistic three ton weight limit and install larger fuel tanks and heavier armour, 13 mm thick; the vehicles were again sent back. In April 1933, Renault submitted two types, fitted with 0.5 ton weights simulating an up-armouring from nine to thirteen millimetres maximum: 79758 was rebuilt with a horizontal rubber spring suspension and 79757 was fitted with a suspension derived from that of 79760, but now with a central vertical spring and the casings of the horizontal springs filled with oil to make them act as dampers. They were tested until June 1933 and, against the strong advice of Renault favouring the rubber springs, on 6 June a production was ordered for prototype 79757 as the AMR Renault modèle 1933 or AMR 33.

== Production ==
On 8 March 1933, the Cavalry had already made a preliminary order of 45 for whatever type would be chosen. This was confirmed on 22 June together with a second order of 20 vehicles and deliveries were to start no later than 1 July. A third order of 50 was made in the autumn. However, due to financial difficulties, the first vehicle was only delivered on 1 June 1934; the last of the 115 was delivered in September. The production of the Citroën half-track was limited to 50. It was decided to rebuild the original prototypes into standard vehicles; however, two were ultimately used to develop the AMR 35, an improved model that was necessary because the too-fragile suspension of the AMR 33 was prone to break down (or even simply to break off) and engine noise was excessive. Prototype 79758 was used to test several other improved configurations. To compensate, three more AMR 33's were built in the spring of 1935 for a total of 123, including all prototypes. The chassis that was used for the development of the Engin P, a project for a 37 mm gun equipped tank destroyer, is not included in this number.

== Description ==
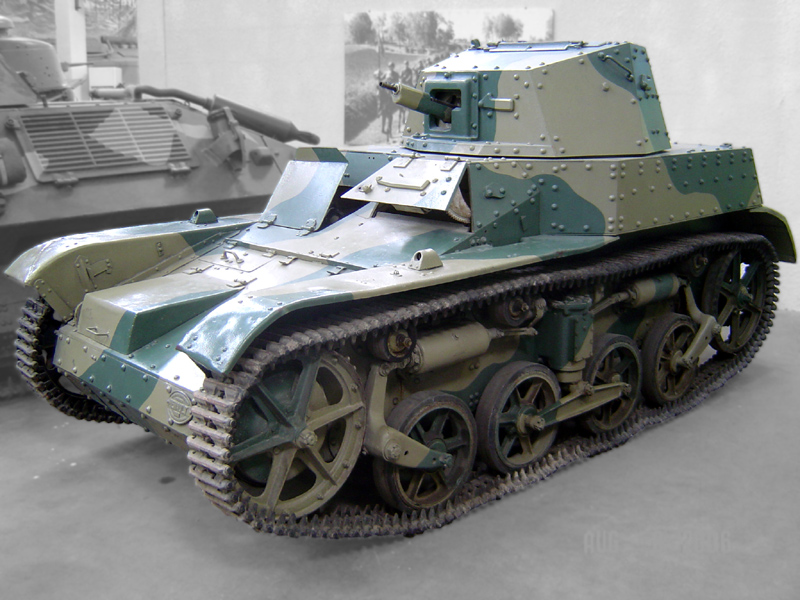
The AMR 33 at Saumur

The AMR 33 was a very small vehicle, 3.5 m (11 ft 6 in) long, 1.64 m (5 ft 5 in) wide and 1.73 m (5 ft 8 in) tall. It weighed only 5.5 metric tonnes; the unloaded weight of the hull 4.5 tonnes. The eight-cylinder 84 hp 4241 cc Renault Nervasport 24 CV engine allowed for an official maximum speed of 54 km/h (34 mph) – the Renault export brochure claimed 60 km/h (37 mph) and an off-road speed of 45 km/h (28 mph). A Cleveland differential was used; there were four forward and one reverse gears. A fuel tank of 128 L (28 imp gal) allowed for a range of 200 km. The tracks were 22 centimetres wide. It had a wading capacity of sixty centimetres; could cross a trench 1.4 m (4 ft 7 in) wide, or climb a 45 cm (18 in) vertical obstacle or a 50% slope.

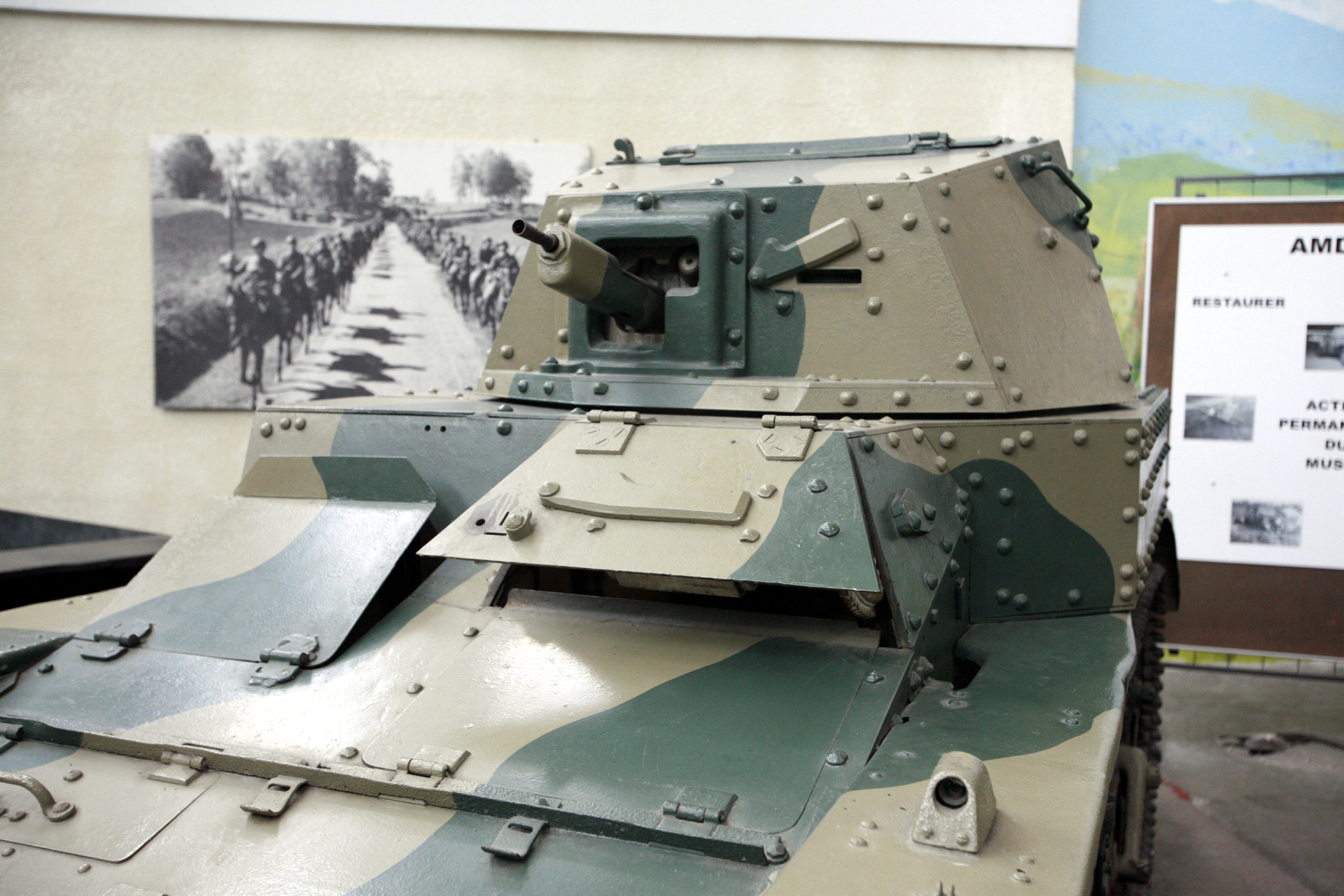
Details of the turret

The (riveted) armour of all vertical plates was 13 mm, of all inclined plates 9 mm, of the top 6 mm and of the bottom 5 mm. There was a crew of two: the driver to the left next to the engine and the tank commander/gunner behind him in the turret which was armed with a 7.5 mm Reibel machine gun. There was also a reserve machine gun that could be optionally placed on a pedestal on top of the turret for defence against aircraft. The vehicle carried 2250 7.5 mm rounds. The original proposal had foreseen the use of a special expensive Schneider turret; the prototypes had a very high octagonal Renault turret at the very back of the hull. This proved to be too awkward and was replaced on the series vehicles by a flatter design from the army Atelier de Vincennes, the AVIS-1, which was moved about a foot to the front to improve visibility. The AVIS was produced by Renault and had, unusually for a French tank turret of the thirties, a hatch in the top for observation. The normal access to the tank was by means of large double hatch at the back of the hull.

== Operational history ==
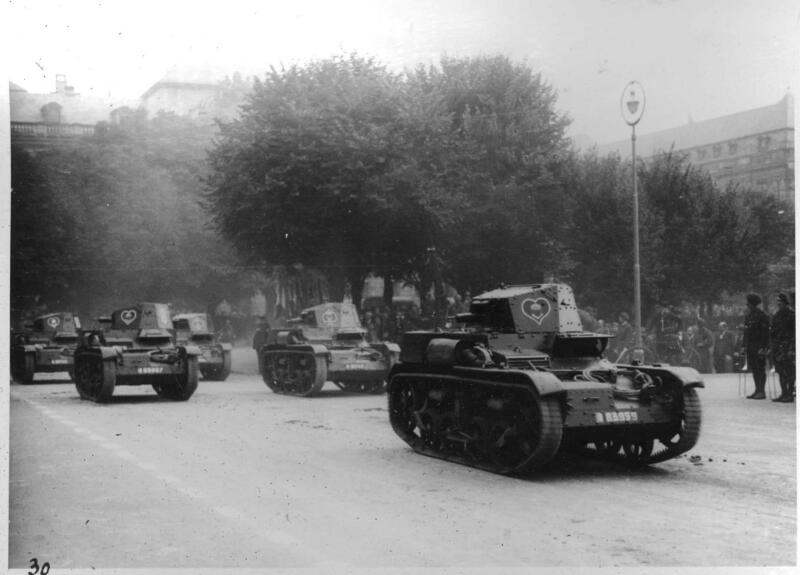
AMR 33 light tanks of the 2e GAM in Strasbourg, 14 July 1938.

The 115 vehicles available in 1934 were assigned to the five cavalry divisions. A squadron of fifteen (three platoons of four, two reserve tanks and a command tank) for the GAM (Groupe d'Automitrailleuses) for each of the first three divisions. The 5e DC had ten and 4e DC, which had priority from the first production batch, received forty: a squadron each for its 4e GAM and its 18e Dragons and another ten for its 4e BDP (Bataillon de Dragons Portés). In 1935, 5e DC received the three rebuilt prototypes, bringing its strength to thirteen. AMR 33s were also allocated to two independent cavalry regiments: 9e Dragons (which received eight from the first batch of 65) and 11e Chasseurs (which received twelve from the second batch of fifty). The organic strength thus equalled the total AMR 33 fleet. The rôle of the AMR 33s in the cavalry divisions was largely that of direct support of the dismounted horsemen.

In 1934, it was decided to transform 4e DC into an armoured division, the 1re DLM (Division Légère Mécanique or "Mechanised Light Division"). For its sole tanks, this division then had six squadrons equipped with the AMR 33, the main battle vehicle being the half-tracked AMC P16s. Its fighting power was thus very limited indeed, but new tanks had been ordered, such as the AMC 34, the AMC 35 and the SOMUA S35. In 1937, a new DLM was created from 5e DC, the 2e DLM. The DLMs had three squadrons of AMRs each to accompany their motorized infantry (among many other types). At that time, however, the mechanical unreliability of the AMR 33 had become obvious and it was decided only to use the AMR 35 in the Cavalry armoured divisions, concentrating the AMR 33s into the remaining DCs. In case of mobilization, each of these would now have a larger RAM (Régiment d'Automitailleuses), to be created from the peacetime GAM, with two AMR squadrons, these again enlarged to four platoons of five plus two reserve tanks and a command tank. Total divisional AMR strength would thus be 46. However, as there were three divisions, their need for 138 vehicles could not be met by the existing AMR 33 number. Therefore, 1re DC was to use the AMR 35 and the only units deploying the AMR 33 remained 2e DC and 3e DC. At the outbreak of the Second World War, France participating from 2 September 1939, total organic AMR 33 strength was still 92 and the remaining 28 AMR 33s were kept in reserve.

However, to create a larger number of motorised units, the last three cavalry divisions were disbanded during the period from 1 December 1939 to 15 February 1940 and their personnel and matériel, supplemented with new motorized units, was redistributed among five new Divisions Légères de Cavalerie ("Cavalry Light Divisions"). It was originally decided that within each Division's Régiment de Dragons Portés (motorised infantry regiment), both battalions would incorporate two AMR 33 platoons (half a squadron), which, together with six reserve tanks, would create a demand for five times 26 or 130 vehicles, slightly more than the available total of 112. These later figures included the AMR 35s of the 1re DLC, inherited from the 1re DC.

On 10 May, the day of the German invasion, this measure was shown to have been still insufficient. Only 5e DLC had its official strength of 26, the other three divisions having apparently not yet started to make an attempt to increase their strength: 2e DLC fielded 22 AMR 33s, 3e DLC had 20 and 4e DLC had 23, for a total strength of 91. There was thus a matériel reserve of 22 vehicles. The type fared very badly in the Battle of France. The DLCs in the Ardennes unexpectedly encountered the main German armoured force and could only fight a delaying battle for which the AMR 33 was not very useful. It was poorly armed and armoured – and very unreliable because of its one good point: its speed, which wore out the suspension units. It was faster than any German tank of the time. Around 10:00 on 10 May, near Vancé, AMR 33 N° 83950 of 3e DLC had the dubious distinction of being the first French tank to be destroyed in the battle, being hit by German anti-tank gunfire, killing the crew. During the first week of the fighting, 75% of the AMR 33s was lost, often because of a breakdown.

On 7 June 1940, the 7e DLM was created, an emergency unit, of which 4e RAM was part. That regiment had an allocation of fourteen AMRs; of this number, probably nine AMR 33s came from the matériel reserve. All these vehicles would be lost before the armistice of 25 June.

Some captured AMR 33s were used by the Germans as the Panzerspähwagen VM 701 (f), probably mostly in France itself.

A single vehicle survives at the Musée des Blindés at Saumur.

== Projects and variants ==
=== AMR 33 TSF ===
In 1934, the three command vehicles of the 4e GAM and 18e Dragons of 4e DC were rebuilt as AMR 33 TSF (Télégraphie Sans Fil or "wireless") by fitting them with an ER29 radio set, the antenna of which was placed on the left rear corner of the hull. It is unknown whether any other command tanks were so modified.

=== Modernisation ===
In 1934, it had already become obvious that Renault had been right in advising the selection of a different suspension type. The standard one proved to be much too flimsy and very maintenance intensive, especially the oil shock dampers. Both the three vehicles built in 1935 and the two rebuilt prototypes were therefore fitted with an improved AMR 35 suspension type with rubber cylinders. Prototype 79758 had been used to test three different systems: the first with the trailer wheel touching the ground, the second with five road wheels and the last, which was the one selected. The second type would form the basis for the Renault ZB, a lengthened export version, destined for China. It was more lightly armoured at 9 mm and had a 65 hp engine. Twelve were ordered in 1938, six with a 13.2 mm machine gun and six with a 37 mm cannon.

After continuing reports regarding the unreliability of the matériel – often ascribed to the fact that half-trained conscripts were the most frequent users rather than professional drivers – it was decided to investigate whether structural changes had to be made. Accordingly, the type was again tested by the Commission de Vincennes between 8 September 1936 and 5 May 1937. The commission concluded on 17 February 1938 that the suspension was fundamentally unsuited for cross-country driving and advised that all existing vehicles be fitted with a new system. When war broke out, it was decided to improve readiness by fully revising all AMR 33s. During that process, they were to be refitted with the new suspension. About half a dozen vehicles had been so modified on 10 May.

=== Type M ===
Late in 1932 – this is known by a later confirming letter dated 18 December 1932 – Renault had a meeting with General Weygand, during which he proposed to develop an entire family of light armoured fighting vehicles based on the AMR 33-chassis. He was especially interested in producing a Voiture légère de transport de personnel, an armoured personnel carrier capable of transporting four to five infantrymen and having a crew of two and a 19 CV engine. As there was insufficient budget to equip even a limited part of the Infantry with fully tracked vehicles, this plan was abandoned. However, on 20 March 1933, Renault received an order from the STMAC (Section Technique des Matériels Automobiles de Combat) to develop a prototype of a different design discussed with Weygand: a command vehicle corresponding to the specifications of 9 January 1931 for a so-called Type M.

In September 1933, two prototypes were presented in Mailly, which were rebuilt with a more powerful 22 CV engine in 1934. In January 1934, it had been decided to order ten of these, but to use the chassis of the AMR 35 instead. The second prototype would be used in the autumn of 1936 to develop the Renault YS artillery observation vehicle, the production vehicles of which would, however, also be based on the AMR 35 chassis.

=== Engin P ===
On 9 January 1931, the French Artillery officially issued the specifications for a Type P, which was to be a véhicule antichar, a self-propelled antitank-gun, that was to serve in the Maginot Line as a tank destroyer. On that date, Renault, who had been informed of the plans about a year earlier, had already begun to develop a prototype. The first plans foresaw a very small tracked vehicle, a chenillette, weighing no more than 1.5 metric tonnes, on which a 25 mm antitank-gun was to be mounted on a tripod in an open position. The gun would have to be removable, so that it also could be placed on the ground after having been transported by the vehicle.

However, the same year, it was decided to let the 25 mm gun be towed by the Renault UE chenillette, making the Type P redundant in its original scope. The Artillery therefore decided to mount, under armour, a much more powerful 37 mm Modèle 1934 fortress gun with a muzzle velocity of 860 m/s, which yet had to be developed by the Atelier de Puteaux, the State armament arsenal.

In 1932, Renault delivered a prototype, a specially built chassis (N° 81805), that in general form resembled the standard AMR 33 but lacked a turret and had a raised hull roof. In the middle of the front of the superstructure, there was room for a gun; to the left of it, the driver was to be seated. Almost all available space was then occupied; this was solved by letting the gun loader sit on the floor, with his outstretched legs below the gun breech. In this cramped position, he was supposed to load the weapon, taking rounds with his right hand from a stock of 107 shells that had been positioned on the left back of the hull, where in the standard AMR 33 the back exit hatch was located. The third crew member, the commander, sat on the right, squeezed between the hull roof and the engine; he had hardly any headroom.

The Puteaux workshop only finished the prototype, now named the Engin P, in the spring of 1935. After the gun was placed, the Engin P weighed 4565 kilogrammes and had a maximum speed of 54.1 km/h. On 18 April 1935, the CEMAV (Commission d'Expériences du Matériel Automobile de Vincennes), after testing, expressed a very negative opinion: "An ancient and outdated model [...] incapable of rendering serious service". Moreover, on 24 June, the Conseil Consultatif de l'Armement decided that in future all guns up to a calibre of 47 mm would have to be towed by the Renault UE after modifying the latter type (though this in fact never happened). As a result, the Engin P was rejected.

=== Renault YI ===
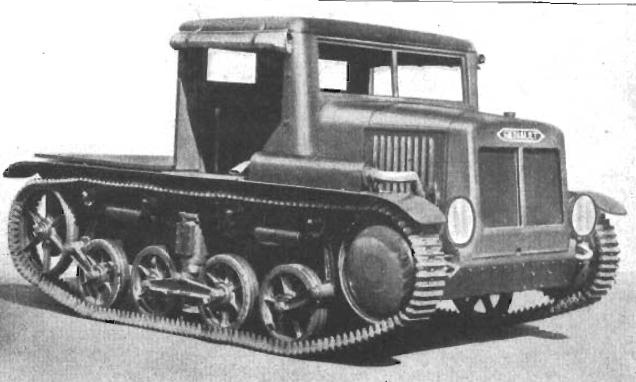
Renault YI

In the years 1932 and 1933, Renault developed a series of three unarmoured military caterpillar tractors. The smallest of these, the tracteur de 2 tonnes, which had the factory designation Renault YI, largely used the AMR 33 suspension, though the sprocket was not spoked but consisted of a single convex plate. The vehicle had an open cargo room behind, the engine in front and the cabin in between. The French Ministry of War ordered two Renault YI.

=== The Trench-Jumper ===
AMR 33 prototype N° 78758 was used in 1935 by the engineer Nicolas Straussler, a former citizen of Austria-Hungary who at the time lived in the United Kingdom, to demonstrate his hydraulic "Trench-Jumper" that he already had tested in England. He had proposed the system to the French Army in 1933 and the Atelier et Chantier de la Loire had obtained an example. The contraption consisted of two large hydraulic arms that were to be fitted on the front and back of a vehicle. The arm in front would secure itself on the opposite bank of a trench to be crossed, preventing the tank from falling in. The tank would then drive over the trench, folding the forward arm, while the back arm would lodge itself on the bank of departure and unfold, pushing the vehicle safely across. In this way, a trench two metres wide could be crossed.

The system was tested on 3 April 1935 and 21 March, 30 April and 4 May 1936 and finally in March 1938. It proved to be quite effective but in 1938 the Commission de Vincennes rejected the project as the small gain in trench-crossing capacity did not make up for the higher weight.

=== Smoke-laying tank ===
In 1938, a smoke-laying system was tested using the AMR 33. An AM5 apparatus was fitted by the Chaubeyre factory. It was not taken into production, despite a favourable report by the Section Technique de la Cavalerie.

== See also ==
- Tanks in France
