= Tanks of France =

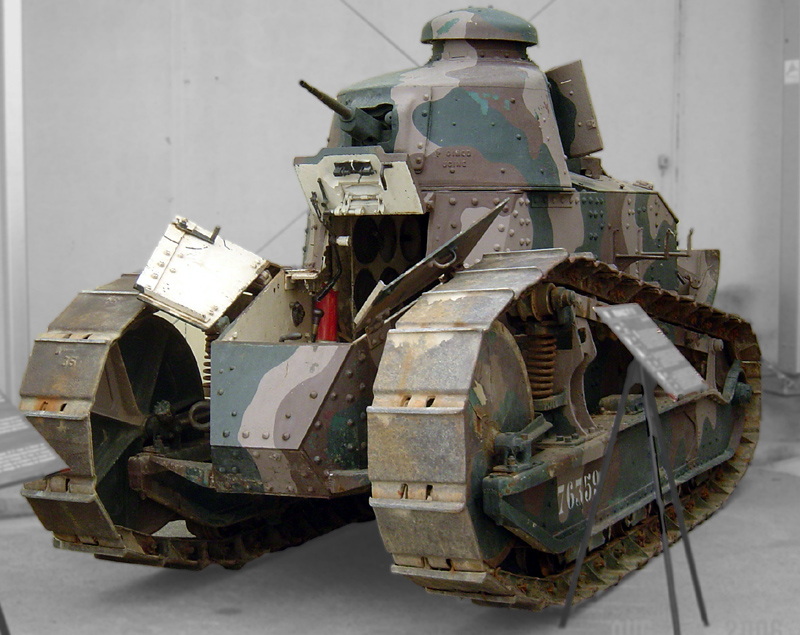
The Renault FT, the first "modern" tank to enter production

French development into tanks began during World War 1 as an effort to overcome the stalemate of trench warfare, and largely at the initiative of the manufacturers. The Schneider CA1 was the first tank produced by France, and 400 units were built. The French also experimented with various tank designs, such as the Frot-Laffly landship, Boirault machine and Souain experiment. Another 400 Saint-Chamond tanks were manufactured from April 1917 to July 1918 but they were underpowered and were of limited utility because the caterpillar tracks were too short for the tank's length and weight. The most significant French tank development during the war was the Renault FT light tank, which set the general layout for future tank designs and was used or redesigned by various military forces, including those of the United States.

== History ==
=== World War I ===
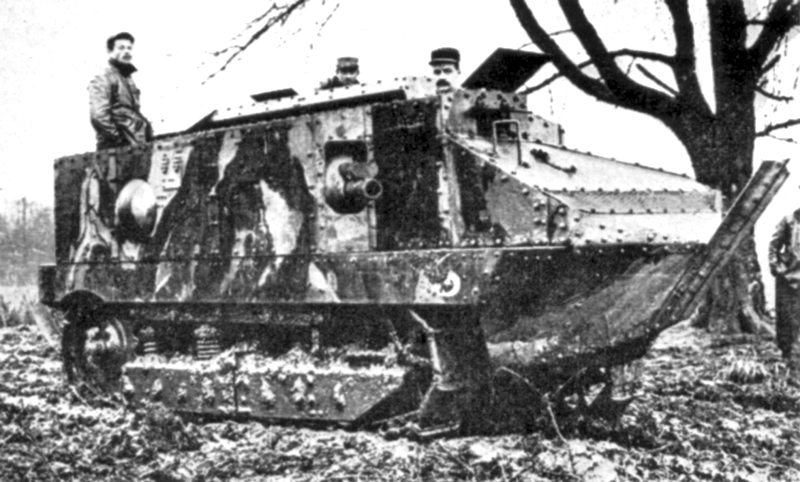
Schneider CA1, the first French tank

While the British began the design and use of tanks in World War I, France at the same time developed its own tracked AFVs, but the situation there was very different. In Britain a single committee had coordinated design, while the major industries remained passive. Almost all production effort was thus concentrated into the Mark I and its direct successors, all very similar in shape. In France, on the other hand, there were multiple and conflicting lines of development which were badly integrated, resulting in three major and quite disparate production types. A major arms producer, Schneider, took the lead in January 1915 and tried to build a first armoured vehicle based on the Baby Holt tractor but initially the development process was slow until in July they received political, even presidential, support by combining their project with that of a mechanical wire cutter devised by engineer and politician Jean-Louis Bréton. In December 1915, the influential Colonel Estienne made the Supreme Command very enthusiastic about the idea of creating an armoured force based on these vehicles; strong Army support for tanks would be a constant during the decades to come. Already in January and February 1916 quite substantial orders were made, at that moment with a total number of 800 much larger than the British ones.

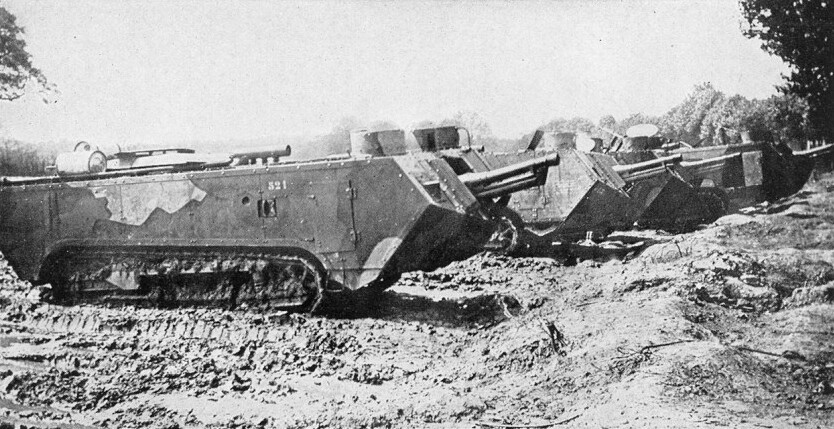
French Saint-Chamond tanks had long bodies with a lot of the vehicle projecting forward over the short caterpillar tracks, making them more liable to get ditched in trenches.

Army enthusiasm and haste would have its immediate drawbacks, however. As a result of the involvement of inexperienced army officers ordered to devise a new tank based on the larger 75 hp Holt chassis in a very short period of time, the first French tanks were poorly designed with respect to the need to cross trenches and did not take the sponson-mounting route of the British tanks. The first, the Char Schneider CA equipped with a short 75 mm howitzer, had poor mobility due to a short track length combined with a hull that overhung front and rear. It was unreliable as well; a maximum of only about 130 of the 400 built were ever operational at the same time. Then industrial rivalry began to play a detrimental role: it created the heavy Char Saint-Chamond, a parallel development not ordered by the Army, but approved by government through industrial lobby, which mounted much more impressive weaponry — its 75 mm was the most powerful gun fielded by any operational tank up till 1941 — but also combined many of the Schneider CA's faults with an even larger overhanging body. Its innovative petro-electrical transmission, while allowing for easy steering, was insufficiently developed and led to a large number of breakdowns.

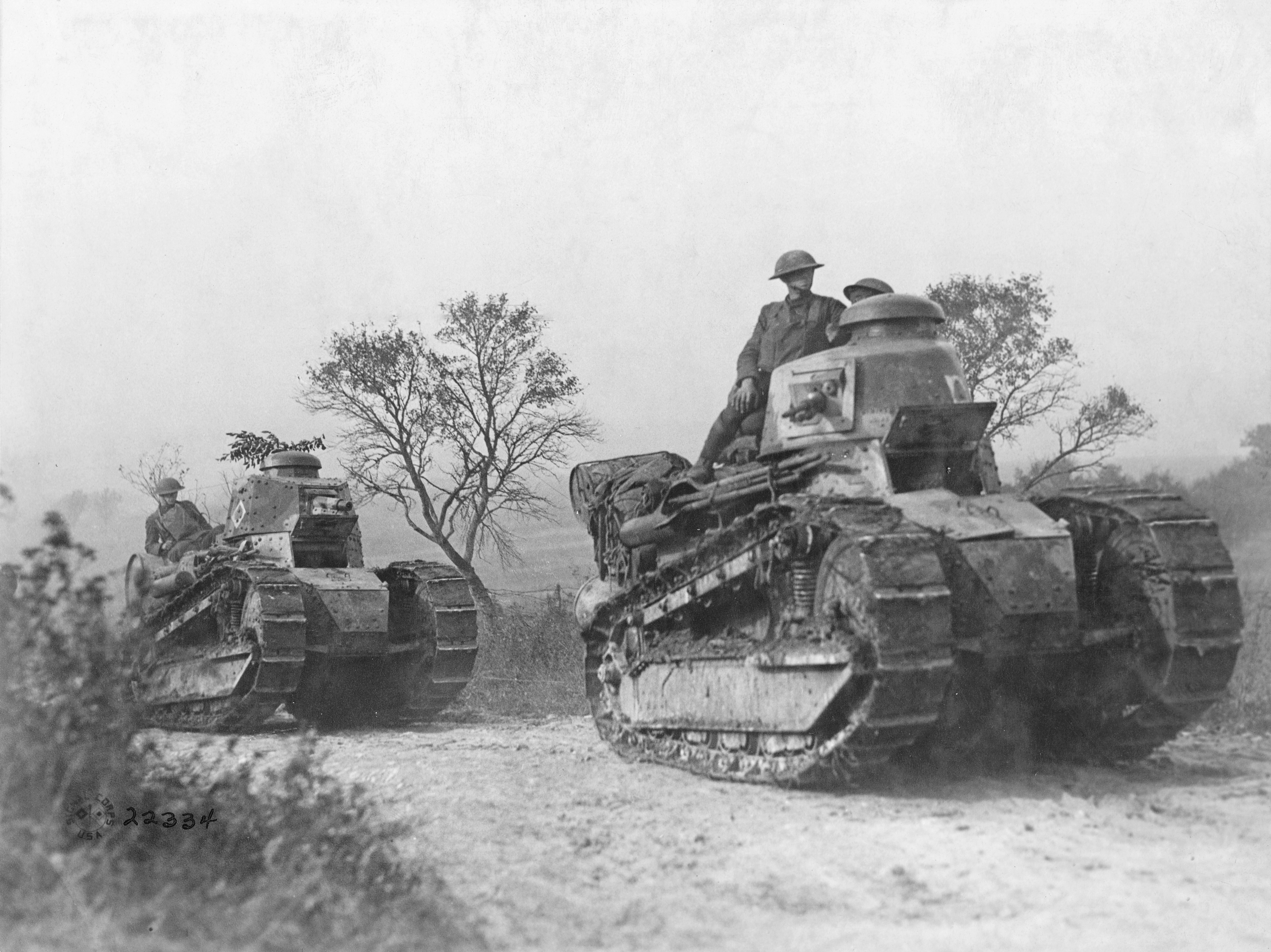
Renault FT tanks being operated by the US Army in France. Light tanks with a crew of only two, these were mass-produced during World War I.

But industrial initiative also led to swift advances. The car industry, already used to vehicle mass production and having much more experience in vehicle layout, in 1916 designed the first practical light tanks, a class largely neglected by the British. It would be Renault's excellent small tank design, the FT, incorporating a proper climbing face for the tracks, that was the first tank to incorporate a top-mounted turret with a full 360° traverse capability. In fact the FT was in many respects the first truly 'modern' tank having a layout that has been followed by almost all designs ever since: driver at the front; main armament in a fully rotating turret on top; engine at the rear. Previous models had been "box tanks" with a single crowded space combining the role of engine room, fighting compartment, ammunition stock and driver's cabin. (A very similar Peugeot prototype, with a fixed casemate mounting a short 75mm cannon, was trialled in 1918, but the idea was not pursued.) The FT would have the largest production run of any tank of the war with over 3,700 built, more numerous than all British tanks combined. That this would happen was at first far from certain; some in the French army lobbied for the alternative mass production of super-heavy tanks. Much design effort was put in this line of development resulting in the gigantic Char 2C, the most complex and technologically advanced tank of its day. Its very complexity ensured it being produced too late to participate in World War I and in the very small number of just ten, but it would be the first tank with a three-man turret; the heaviest to enter service until late in World War II and still the largest ever operational.

French production at first lagged behind the British. After August 1916 however, British tank manufacture was temporarily halted to wait for better designs, allowing the French to overtake their allies in numbers. When the French used tanks for the first time on 16 April 1917, during the Nivelle Offensive, they had four times more tanks available. But that would not last long as the offensive was a major failure; the Schneiders were badly deployed and suffered 50% losses from German long-range artillery. The Saint-Chamond tanks, first deployed on 5 May, proved to be so badly designed that they were unable to cross the first line of German trenches.

=== Inter War ===
The French used a very wide range of tanks, including many unique types. France was the second largest tank producer in the world, behind the Soviet Union (see French armoured fighting vehicle production during World War II). French cavalry tank designs saw attempts to balance the needs of firepower, protection and mobility. They also fielded a heavy tank design, and several lighter types for scouting and infantry support. In addition to these types, they were also working on super-heavy breakthrough tanks (FCM F1). The French didn't have an independent Tank Corps. All tanks belonged to either the Infantry or the Cavalry.

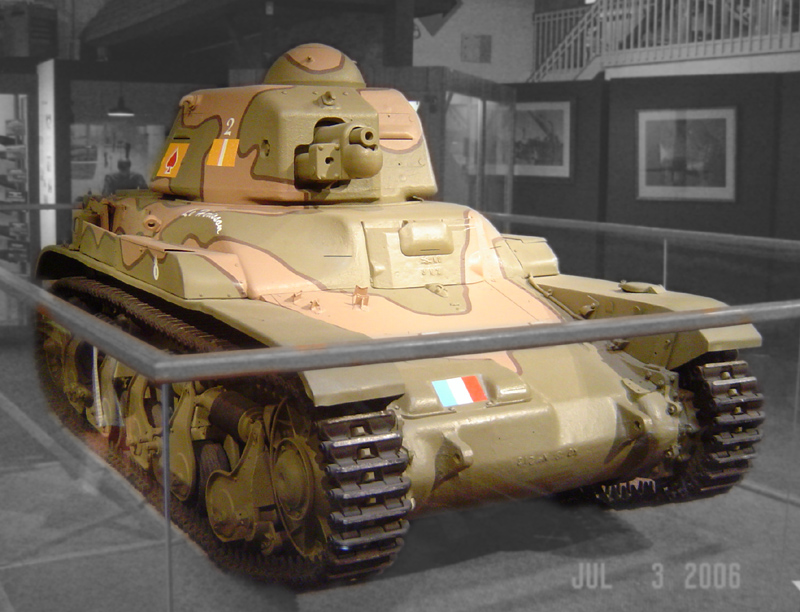
The French Renault R 35 tank

- Infantry Tanks (Chars)
  - Light Tanks (Chars Légers), generally similar to other nations' light tanks, though they were intended to be used more for infantry support rather than scouting, and as such were better armoured but slower than many other light tanks. The Renault R 35 was the most common type; small numbers of the futuristic FCM 36 were built. The R 35 was also exported to several eastern European countries, including Poland.
  - Medium Tanks (Chars de Bataille), these were in fact meant to be specialised breakthrough tanks (Char D1, Char D2, Char B1).
  - Heavy Tanks (Chars Lourds); only the World War I-vintage Char 2C was ever operational in this class, being the reason why the breakthrough role was delegated to the Chars de Bataille.
- Cavalry Tanks (Automitrailleuses). These classes focused on speed in addition to the power and protection of other tank designs, and were intended for both anti-tank and anti-personnel work. As by law all tanks (Chars) had to be part of the Infantry, the Cavalry called its tanks Automitrailleuses. These included the Hotchkiss H35.
  - Armoured Combat Tanks (AMCs or Automitrailleuses de Combat), a medium tank that sacrificed some armour for speed, and had similar armament to the infantry tanks (AMC 34, AMC 35, SOMUA S35).
  - Armoured Reconnaissance (AMRs or Automitrailleuses de Reconnaissance), essentially light tanks (AMR 33; AMR 35), but specifically intended for general reconnaissance and maintaining a security screen. Specialised reconnaissance however would be carried out by AMD's or Automitrailleuses de Découverte, typically armoured cars or half-tracks.

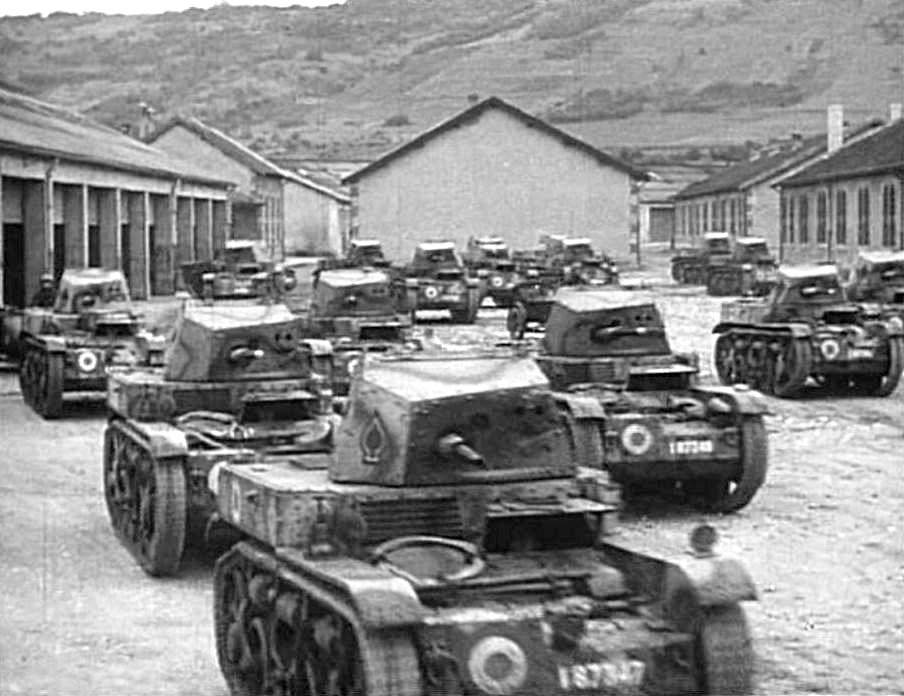
French 13.2 mm-armed AMR 35s, belonging to 4e RDP, 1re DLM.

The Renault FT had a long life and saw use in World War II and even later in Indochina. It was utilised as far away as in China, during the Chinese Civil wars, and versions of the tank were used both against and by the Japanese during the invasion of China. A large number found their way into both Republican and Nationalist hands during the Spanish Civil War. They were used in the Russian Revolution by both the Bolsheviks and the White Russians, and later by the Finns against the Soviets. France exported the FT right up to World War II. The design was also developed by the Italians as the Fiat 3000 and the USSR as the T-18.

By the mid-1930s the French Army was replacing the aging FT fleet with a mixed force of light tanks both in the Infantry and Cavalry branches, as well as medium and heavy tanks. The Infantry light tanks included the Renault R 35, which followed the FT concept quite closely with its very small size, two-man crew, and short 37 mm gun armament. It was, however, heavily armored. The R 35 was mostly used to equip the independent tank battalions, an armoured reserve allocated at army level and intended to reinforce infantry divisions in breakthrough operations. French infantry divisions normally had no organic tank component. The R 35 was exported to Poland and Romania. The cavalry had the similar Hotchkiss H 35, armed with the same 37 mm, as well as light recon tanks such as the AMR 35.

France also produced what may have been the best tank of the 1930s, the SOMUA S35. This tank equipped the armoured divisions of the Cavalry which had to execute the exploitation phase of a battle and was probably the best combination of armour, firepower and mobility prior to the appearance of the German PzKpfw IV Ausf. F2 and Soviet T-34. The S 35 had a long 47 mm gun that could kill any tank then in service, as well as heavy cast armour and good speed.

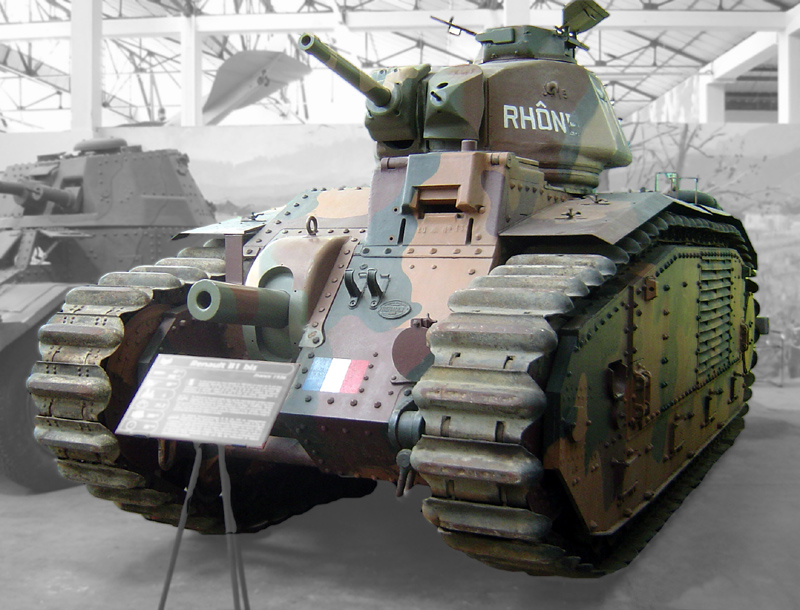
A Char B1 bis at the Musée des Blindés at Saumur

The French char de bataille Char B1 tank was a very formidable tank, with heavy cast and riveted armour, the same long 47 mm gun as in the S 35, and a hull-mounted 75 mm howitzer. All Char B1s were equipped with radio and the tank was nearly invulnerable to most tanks and towed antitank guns. They equipped the armoured divisions of the Infantry, which were specialised breakthrough units.

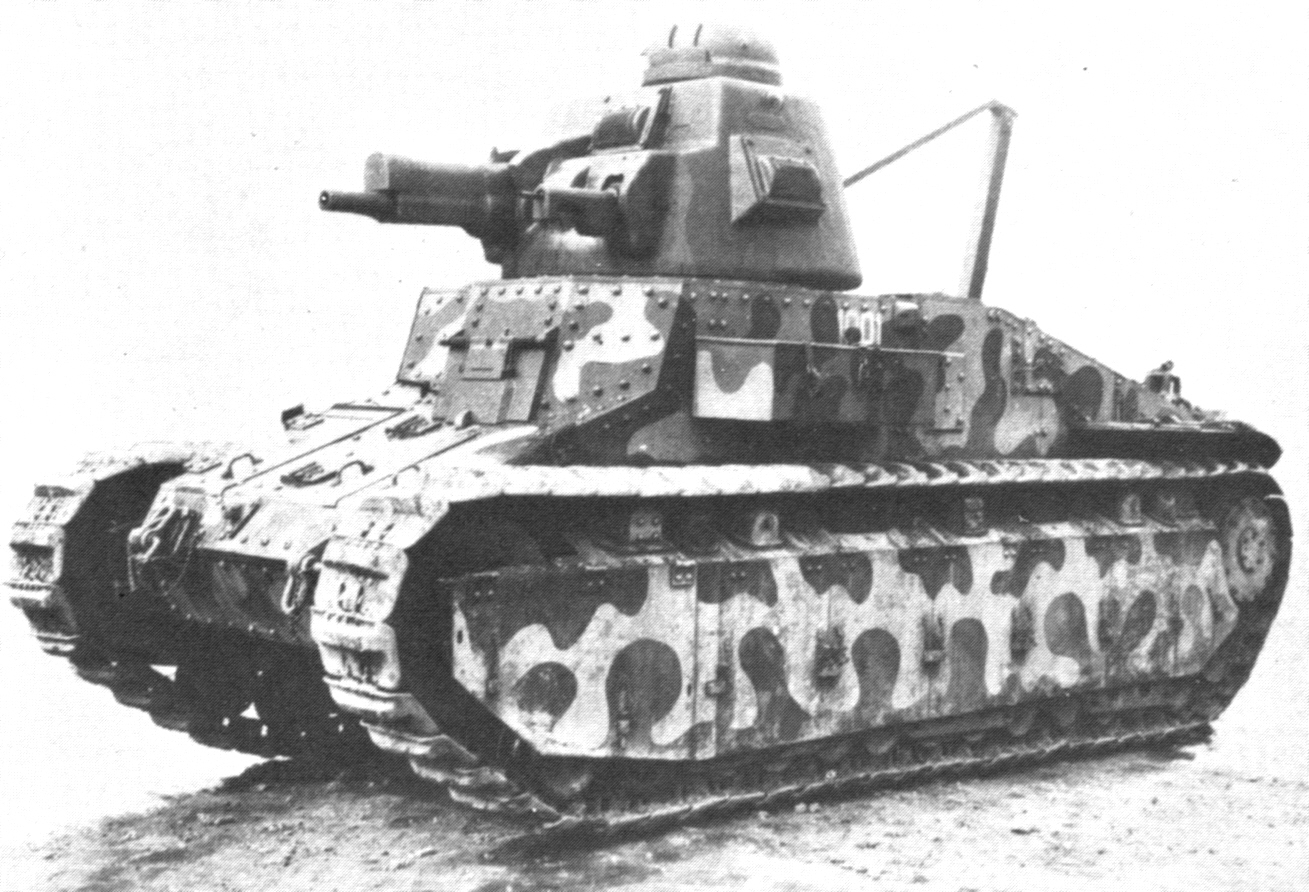
Char D1 with ST2 turret in 1936

The French plan of 1926, calling for the creation of a Light Infantry Support Tank, led to the development of the existing Renault NC1 prototype into the Char D1. On 23 December 1930 a first order of 70 main production series of Char D1 tanks was made, followed on 12 July 1932 by a second order of 30; the last order on 16 October 1933 was of 50 vehicles, for a total of 150, delivered between January 1932 and early 1935.

In general, French tanks of the 1930s were well-armoured, innovative vehicles that owed little to foreign designs. However, the light tanks lacked firepower, tended to be slow, and almost all French tanks were weakened by their one-man turrets. Even the vaunted Char B1 had a commander who was tasked with commanding the vehicle, aiming the main gun, and loading the main gun. If he were a platoon leader or company commander, he had the additional tasks of controlling his other units. Such a heavy set of tasks was overwhelming, and greatly reduced the effectiveness of the tanks. The lack of radios with the light tanks was not seen as a major drawback, since French doctrine called for slow-paced, deliberate manoeuvers in close conformance to plans: the "Methodical Battle" concept, adopted because wargaming showed it to be superior. The role of small unit leaders was to execute plans, not to take the initiative in combat. This was nearly the opposite of German doctrine, which stressed initiative and decision-making at low command levels (Auftragstaktik). In 1939 a belated effort was made to improve flexibility and increase the number of radios

Despite the views of Estienne and later Charles de Gaulle, the French general staff failed in defining an effective military doctrine regarding their use, due to the division of labour between infantry and cavalry tanks.

=== Battle of France ===
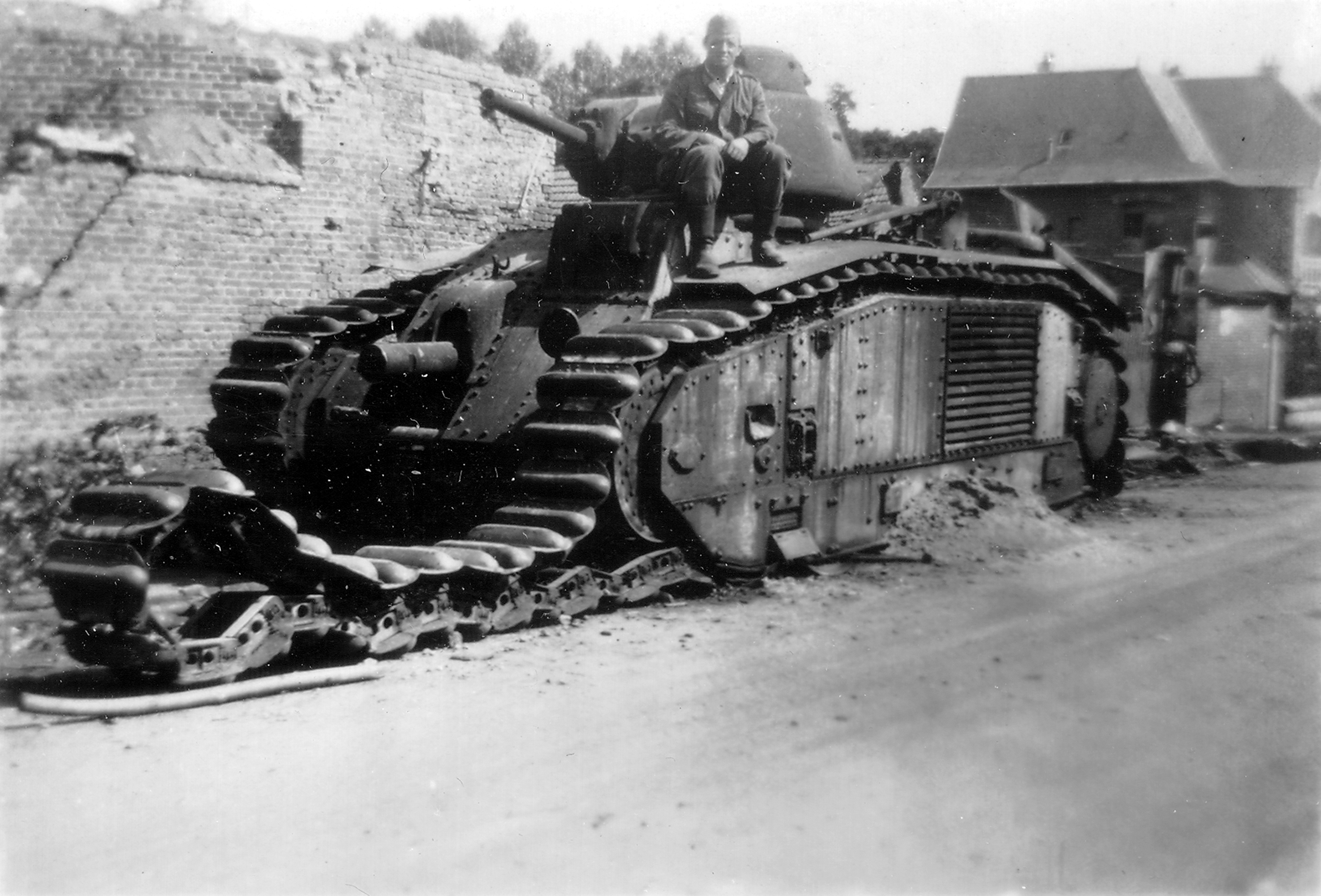
Disabled Char B1 Bis "Senegal" in Saint-Simon, May 1940

The French strategy was informed by its experience of the First World War. The long French border with Germany was protected by the Maginot Line, a series of supporting defensive measures, which would prevent the quick capture of important industrial areas, stall any attack until the French Army was fully mobilised, and allow the French to fight a "long war" which would wear down and defeat Germany whose capability to fight a protracted war was limited. If Germany went to the north of the line, it would be met by the French Army, assisted by Britain, in Belgium. At the start of the war, France had one of the largest tank forces in the world along with the Soviet, British and German (about 3000, majority of which were light tanks) forces. The French had planned for a defensive war and built tanks accordingly; many of their tanks - even those called léger ("light") were well armoured. Within France and its colonies, roughly 5,800 tanks were available during the time of the German offensive, and some when they came into contact were effective against the German tanks.

The R 35 was intended to replace the FT as standard light infantry tank from the summer of 1936, but even by May 1940 not enough conscripts had been retrained and therefore eight battalions of the older tank had to be kept operational. On 1 September 1939, at the outbreak of war, 975 vehicles had been delivered out of 1,070 produced; 765 were fielded by tank battalions in France. Of a total order for 2,300 at least 1,601 had been produced until 1 June 1940 serial numbers known to be actually used indicate a production of at least 1670 vehicles.

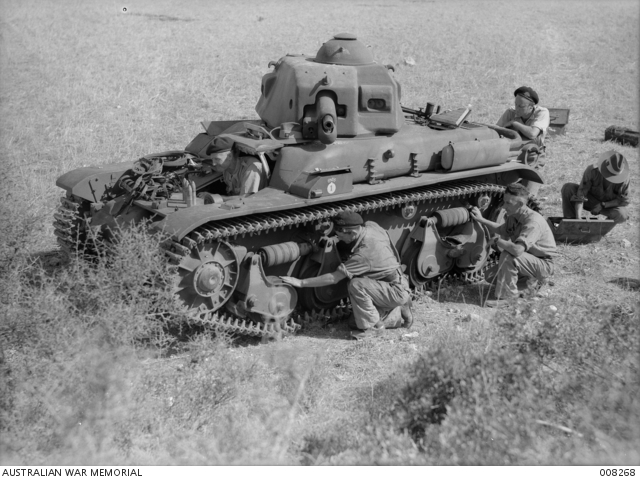
R35 tank

In the Battle of France, despite an advantage in number and armour against the Germans, the French tanks were not used to good enough effect. Ironically, cooperation with the infantry was poor. The Cavalry units alone were too few in number.

In armour and firepower, French tanks were generally not inferior to their German counterparts. In one incident, a single Char B1 "Eure" was able to destroy thirteen German tanks within a few minutes in Stonne on 16 May 1940, all of them Panzer III and Panzer IV tanks. The 37mm and 20mm guns the Germans used were ineffective at penetrating the thick armour of the B1, which was able to return safely despite being hit a large number of times. Even German General Rommel was surprised at how the French tanks withstood the German tank shells and had to resort to using the German 88 artillery as antitank guns against the French tanks to knock them out. Setbacks the French military suffered were more related to strategy, tactics and organisation than technology and design. Almost 80 percent of French tanks did not have radios, since the battle doctrine employed by the French military was more a slow-paced, deliberate conformance to planned maneuvers. French tank warfare was often restricted with tanks being assigned for infantry support. Unlike Germany, which had special Panzerwaffe divisions, France did not separate tanks from the Infantry arm, and were unable to respond quickly to the Blitzkrieg tactics employed by the Germans, which involved rapid movement, mission-type orders and combined-arms tactics.

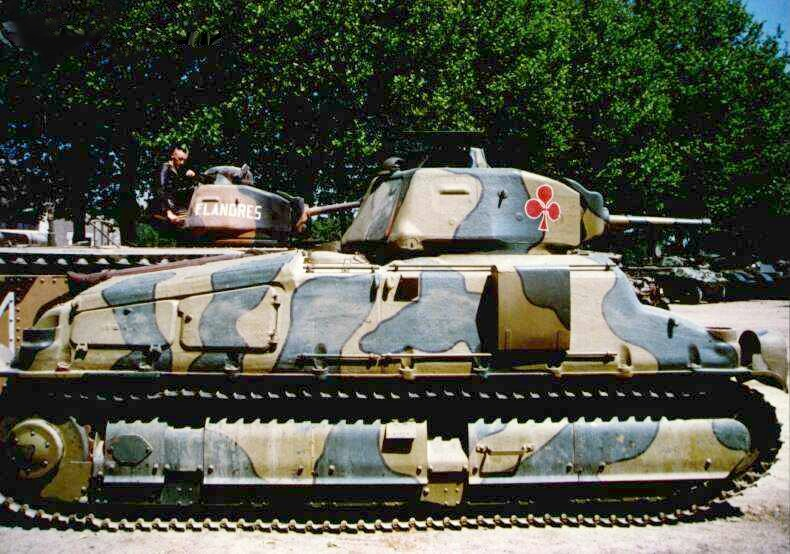
SOMUA S35 French tank

The S35 medium tank entered service in January 1936 with the 4e Cuirassiers. At the end of 1937 the SA 35 gun became available and deliveries of the main production series could begin. By mid 1938 a hundred had been produced, 270 on 1 September 1939 and 246 delivered. On this date 191 served with the troops, 51 were in depot and four had been sent back to the factory for overhaul. After the outbreak of war a fourth order of 200 was made, bringing the ordered total to 700. Later it was decided that from the 451st vehicle onward the tanks would be of the improved S 40 type. Production in fact totalled 430 by June 1940, including the prototype and the preseries.

Of these about 288 were in front-line service at the beginning of the Battle of France, with the three armoured divisions of the Cavalry, the Divisions Légères Mécaniques or Mechanised Light Divisions ("light" here meaning "mobile"). Each of these had an organic strength of eight squadrons with ten S35s; each squadron however had a matériel reserve of two tanks and regimental and brigade commanders in practice had personal tanks too, resulting in a total of 88 vehicles per division. Furthermore, 31 were present in the general matériel reserve, 49 in factory stocks and 26 were being processed for acceptance. These vehicles were later issued to several ad hoc units, such as the 4th DCR (commanded by Charles de Gaulle) which received 39, part of 3e Cuirassiers, the 4th DLM (10), and some Corps-francs Motorisés (about 25). Also the destroyed 1st, 2nd and 3rd DLM were reconstituted with a small number of tanks, the first two divisions received ten S 35s, the third twenty; S 35s further served with the 7e Cuirassiers (25) and a platoon of three was present in the 3e RAM of the 3e DLC.

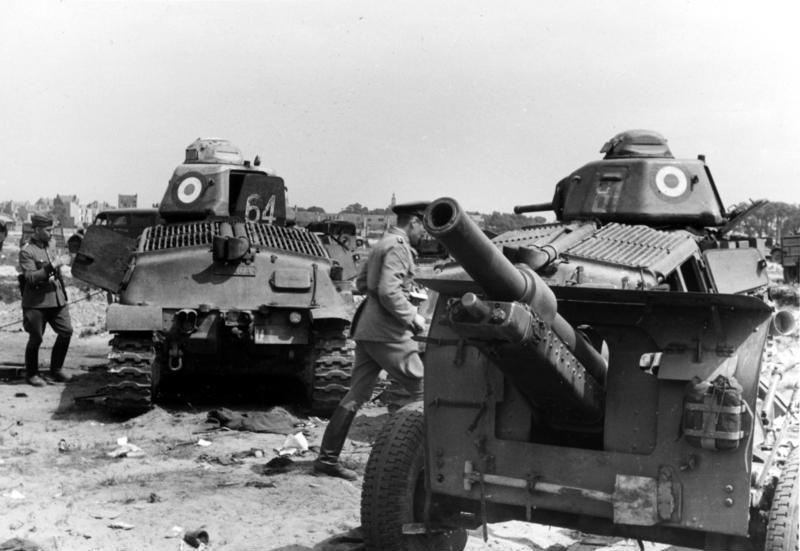
S 35s captured by Germany in 1940

In May 1940 during the Battle of France the DLMs were tasked with the difficult manoeuvre of carrying out a quick advance into the Low Countries, followed by a holding action to allow the infantry divisions following behind to dig themselves in. The 2nd and 3rd DLM were concentrated in the Gembloux gap between Louvain and Namur, where there were no natural obstacles to impede a German advance. They had to spread out somewhat to hold that sector against incursions by the German 3rd and 4th Panzer Divisions. This was necessitated by the local tactical situation and did not reflect some fundamental difference in doctrine between the use of the DLMs and the Panzerdivisionen. Both types of units were very similar in equipment, training and organisation, as the German armoured divisions too were primarily intended for strategic exploitation, while the breakthrough phase was preferably left to the infantry. The resulting tank battle from 13 to 15 May, the Battle of Hannut, was with about 1700 AFVs participating the largest until that day and is still one of the largest of all time. The S 35s gave a good account of themselves, proving to be indeed superior to the German tanks in direct combat, but they were rather hesitantly deployed as the French High Command mistakenly supposed the gap was the German Schwerpunkt and tried to preserve their best tanks to block subsequent attacks by the rest of the Panzerwaffe.

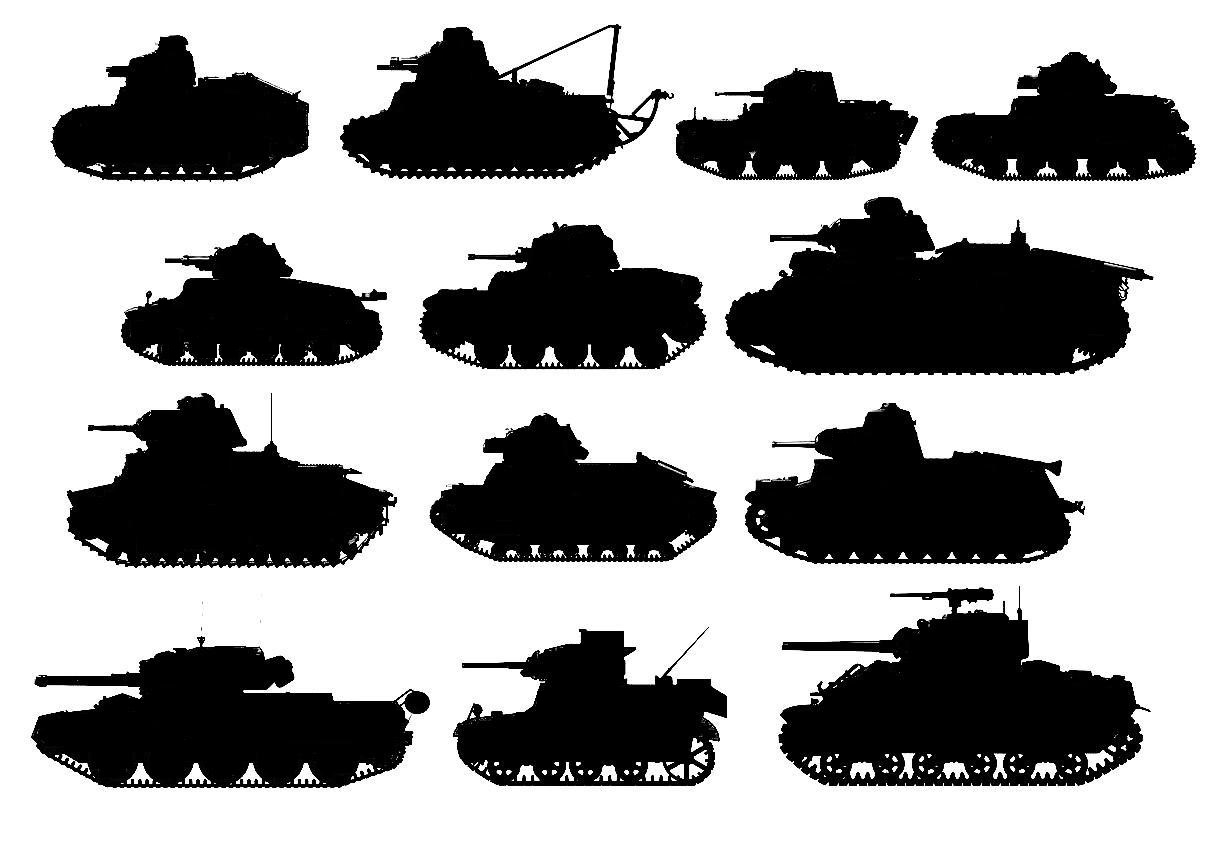
tanks operated by France during WW2

When it transpired the attack was really a feint and the forces in the north were in danger of being cut off by the German advance south of Namur, the 1st DLM that had very quickly moved 200 kilometres to the north to help the Dutch, was hurriedly rushed south again. The resulting disorder and breakdown of most of its S 35s rendered this unit, the most powerful of all Allied divisions, impotent; it was defeated by the German 5th Panzerdivision on 17 May. The other DLMs fought a delaying battle, participated in the Battle of Arras and then disintegrated. Committing its only strategically mobile armour reserve early in the battle had made the French Army fatally vulnerable to a German strategic surprise.

After the June 1940 armistice, S 35s were allowed to be sent to West Africa to bolster the hold of the Vichy regime in that region. They were issued to the 12e régiment de Chasseurs d'Afrique that, after French West Africa had sided with the Allies, operated them against German and Italian forces during the Tunisia Campaign. After the liberation of France in 1944 an armoured unit was raised, the 13e Régiment de Dragons, using French matériel, among which were seventeen S 35s.

After the fall of France a number of S 35s (297 were captured according to some sources) were taken into service with the Wehrmacht as the Panzerkampfwagen 35-S 739(f). The Germans modified the cupola by cutting its top off and installing a simple hatch.

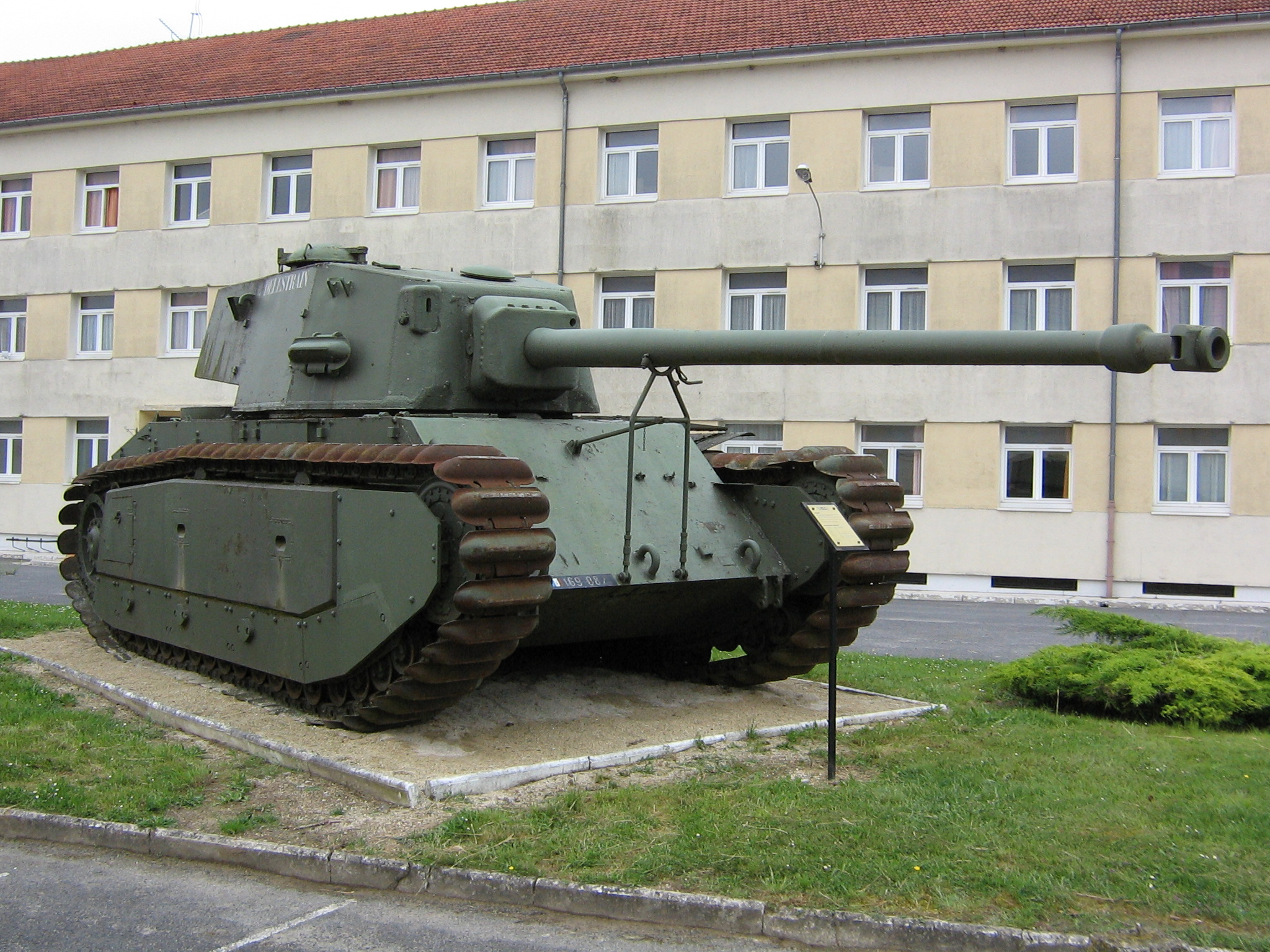
The ARL 44 at Mourmelon-le-Grand

The 21st and 25. Panzerdivision in 1943 used some S 35s when reforming after having been largely destroyed. Some of these units fought in Normandy in 1944, and there were still twelve S 35s listed as in German service on 30 December 1944.

After the Fall of France, work on new designs, such as the Char G1, officially halted, although there was some clandestine designing done.

==== Bir Hakeim ====
One of the first key battles the Free French forces fought after they joined the Allies was at Bir Hakeim where they defended against the attack by the Italian Ariete Division in the first phase of the battle of Gazala, and later under attack by a combined force of the Trieste and 90th Light Infantry Division. The battle at Bir Hakeim was at a remote oasis in the Libyan desert, and the former site of a Turkish fort. During the Battle of Gazala, the 1st Free French Division of Général de brigade Marie Pierre Kœnig defended the site from 26 May-11 June 1942 against much larger attacking German and Italian forces directed by Generaloberst Erwin Rommel. The battle was later greatly used for propaganda purposes by all involved parties. Tobruk was taken 10 days later by Rommel's troops. Rommel continued to advance against delaying actions by the British until halted at First Battle of El Alamein in July.

Général Bernard Saint-Hillier said in an October 1991 interview: "A grain of sand had curbed the Axis advance, which reached Al-Alamein only after the arrival of the rested British divisions: this grain of sand was Bir Hakeim."

Rommel's attack: frontal attack on Gazala and bypass towards Bir Hakeim, while the British Army retreats to cover Tobruk.

On the night of 26 May 1942, Rommel started a planned attack with the 15th and 21st Panzer Divisions, and the rest of the 90th Motorized Infantry Division, and the Italian Trieste and Ariete Divisions started the large encircling move south of Bir-Hakeim as planned. The British armoured units were taken by surprise and retreated.

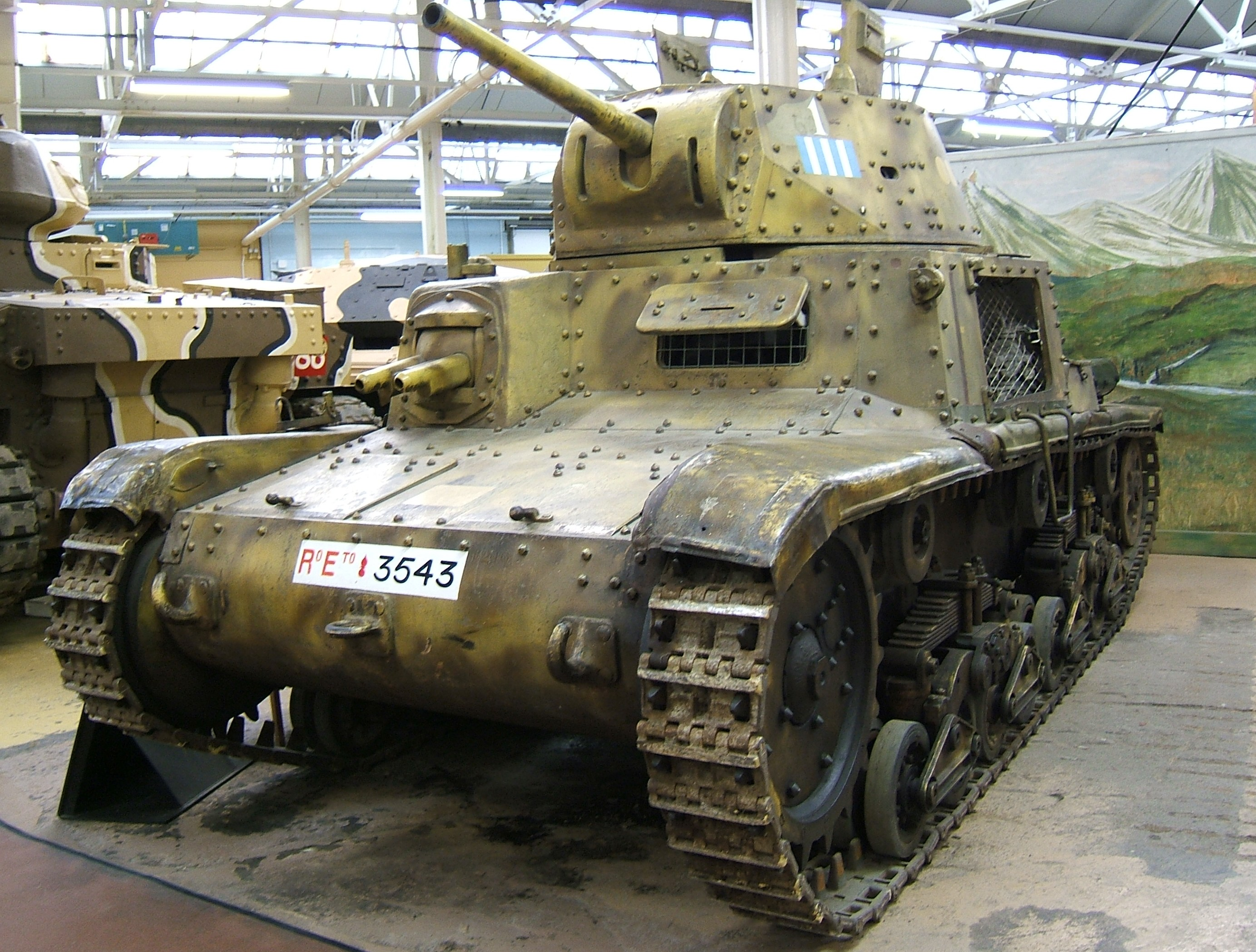
Italian M13/40 tank

Rommel then sent the Ariete Armoured Division - to attack Bir Hakeim from the southeast. This division - formed of the 132nd Armoured Regiment, equipped with M13/40s, of the 8th Reggimento bersaglieri and of the 132nd Artillery Regiment - attacked the French position from the rear in two successive waves. The Italian tanks and armoured vehicles attacked without infantry support and tried to cross the minefield. Six tanks managed to infiltrate the French lines, avoiding mines and anti-tank fire, but they were eventually destroyed by very close range 75 mm fire, and the crews were captured.

The Ariete Division, reduced to only 33 tanks in 45 minutes, had to retreat. The remaining tanks then tried to outflank the French forces by attacking through the V zone minefield protecting that face. They eventually regrouped and retreated, leaving behind 32 destroyed tanks. However north of Bir Hakeim, the 3rd Indian Motor Brigade had been annihilated, and two weakened British brigades - the 4th and the motorized 7th Armoured - were forced to retreat to Bir-el-Gubi and to The El-Adem, leaving Bir-Hakeim and the Free French Forces to fight the full brunt of Rommels forces.

Rommel's success in the north was very costly, and Rommel's wide flanking plan was proving riskier because of the resistance at Bir Hakeim (his right flank and supply route was threatened by this position). The Afrika Korps had to take Bir Hakeim. So Rommel sent the Trieste division, the 90th Light Infantry Division, and 3 recon armored regiments from the Pavia division against Bir Hakeim.

The German infantry launched a full attack, supported by the 15th Panzerdivision, with heavy barrages from the artillery. A breach was made and on 9 June, the evacuation order reached the French camp. and the Free French Forces fought their way back to the British lines,

==== 2nd Armoured Division ====
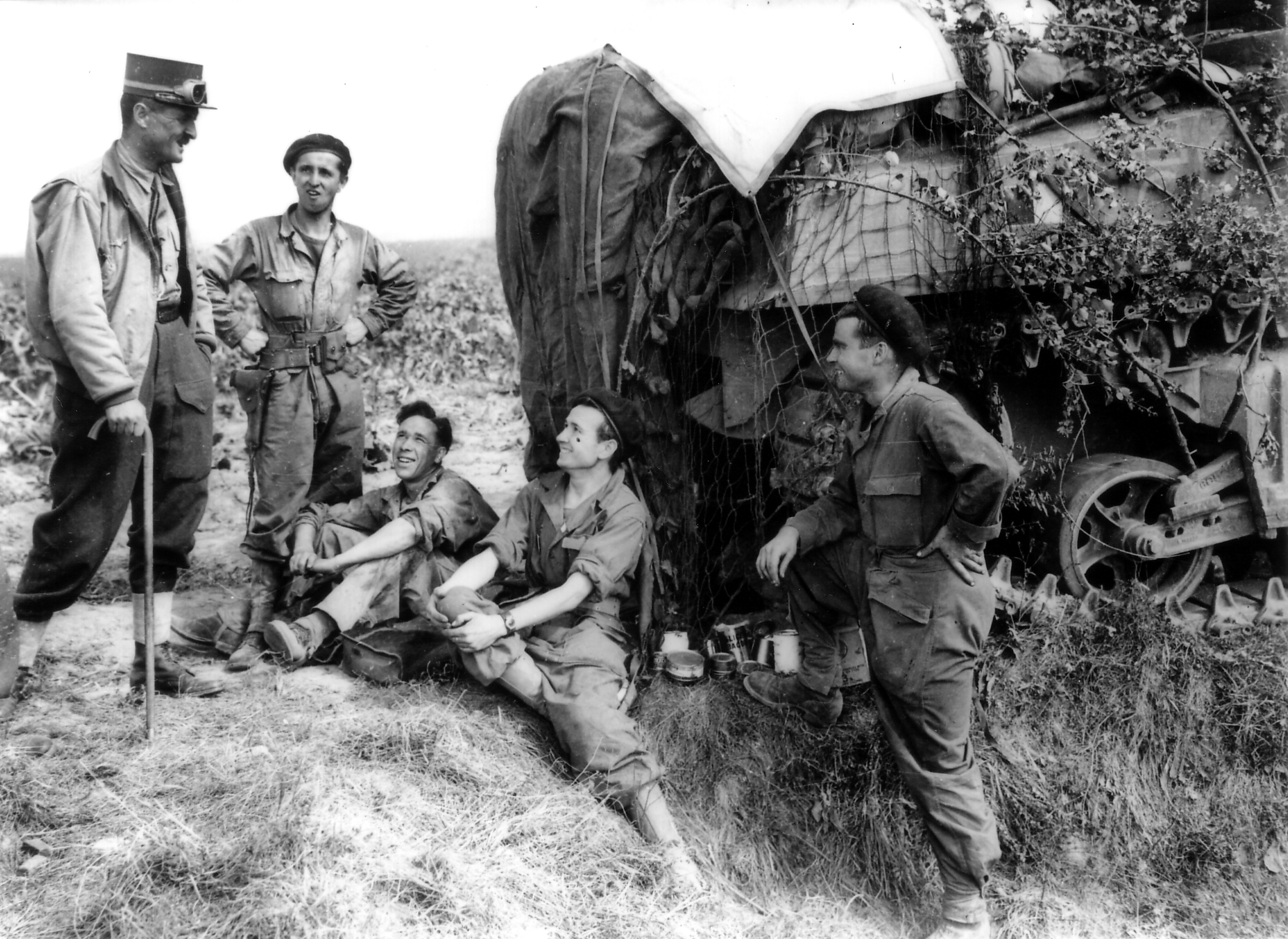
General Leclerc talks to his men from the 501° RCC (501st Tank Regiment).

The French 2nd Armoured Division (French: 2e Division Blindée, 2e DB), was commanded by General Philippe Leclerc, one of the best French tank commanders. General Leclerc joined the Free French forces after the fall of France and adopted the Resistance pseudonym "Jacques-Philippe Leclerc". Charles de Gaulle upon meeting him promoted him from Captain to Major (commandant) and ordered him to French Equatorial Africa as governor of French Cameroon from 29 August 1940 to 12 November 1940. He commanded the column which attacked Axis forces from Chad, and, having marched his troops across West Africa, distinguished himself in Tunisia.

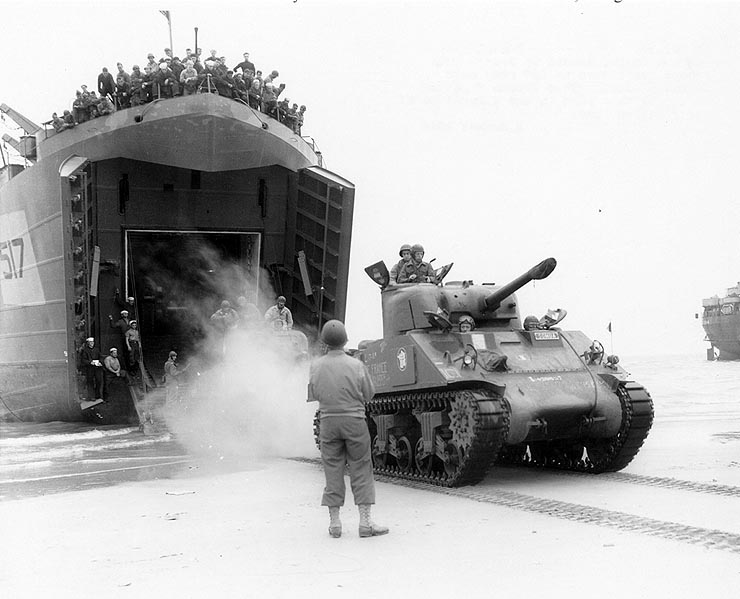
M4A2 Sherman tanks of the Île de France of the 12e RCA, 2e DB coming ashore in Normandy

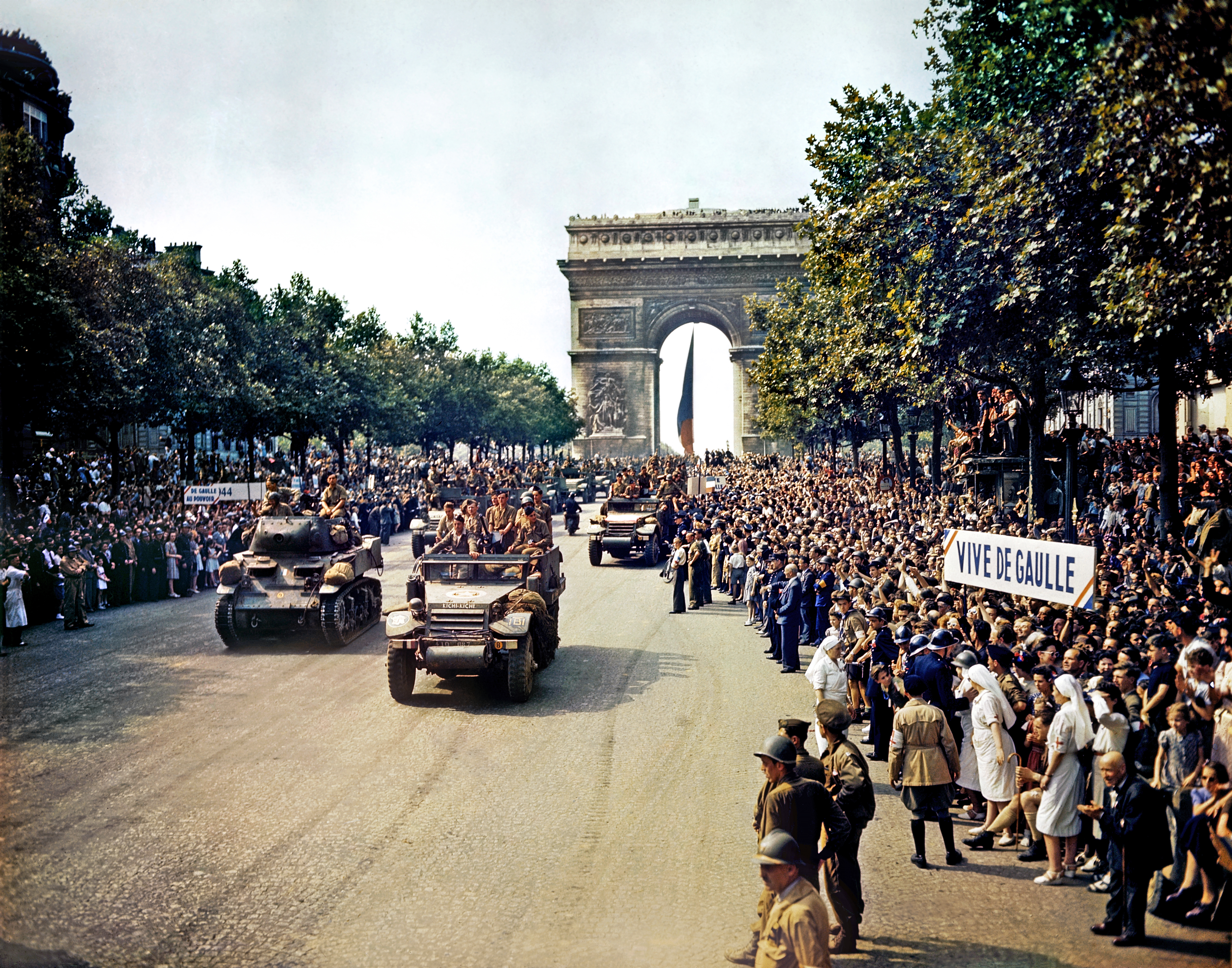
The 2nd Armored Division marching on the Champs Élysées on 26 August 1944.

The French 2nd Armoured Division was formed around a core of units that had raided Italian Libya since the end of 1940 to entering Tripoli 1943 under Leclerc, but was known for its fight at Kufra in 1941; later renamed the 2nd Light Division, in August 1943, it was organized under the US light armoured division organization.

After landing in Normandy on 1 August 1944, his 2nd Armoured Division participated in the battle of the Falaise Pocket (12 to 21 August) where they all but destroyed the 9th Panzer Division and went on to liberate Paris. Allied troops were avoiding Paris, moving around it clockwise towards Germany. This was to minimize the danger of the destruction of the historic city if the Germans sought to defend it. Leclerc and de Gaulle had to persuade Eisenhower to send Leclerc's 2nd Armored Division and they entered Paris, and the liberation by Leclerc help cement de Gaulle's claim as leader of the French.

On 25 August, the 2nd Armoured and the U.S. 4th Division entered Paris and liberated it. After hard fighting that cost the 2nd Division 35 tanks, 6 self-propelled guns, and 111 vehicles, von Choltitz, the German military governor of Paris, capitulated at the Hôtel Meurice.

After the division liberated Paris, it defeated a Panzer brigade during the armoured clashes in Lorraine, forced the Saverne Gap, and liberated Strasbourg. After taking part in the Battle of the Colmar Pocket, the division was moved west and assaulted the German-held Atlantic port of Royan, before recrossing France in April 1945 and participating in the final fighting in southern Germany.

After the liberation of France, the next tank to be introduced would be the ARL 44 heavy tank, which came too late to participate in World War II, but was used post-war for a time. The ARL 44s equipped the 503e Régiment de Chars de Combat stationed in Mourmelon-le-Grand and replaced seventeen Panther tanks used earlier by that unit.Later, AMX-50 tank series will be introduced under rarely-known project 141, which developed around the same time when the Pacific campaign was still underway by spring or summer of 1945, which marked a new era of French tanks in post-war era when French tanks needed to be modernized.

=== Cold War ===
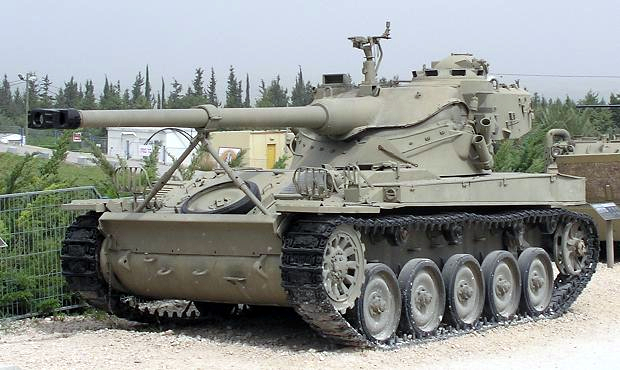
AMX-13 light tank, produced from 1953 to 1985

Various tank designs were built by France after World War II. Tank models such as the AMX-13 and AMX-30 were also exported to various other nations. Newer French tank designs sacrificed armour protection for increased mobility, due to the idea that the large amount of armour required to protect against modern anti-tank threats would significantly affect maneuverability, and that a higher speed and more compact vehicle dimensions would be more effective in protecting the tank from potential threats.

A rift formed between France and West Germany following Charles de Gaulle's decision that France would no longer participate in NATO, with West Germany opposing a standardised common tank project. In 1963, both West Germany and France declared that they would produce purely national tanks. Development towards main battle tank projects such as the AMX-30 occurred soon afterwards.

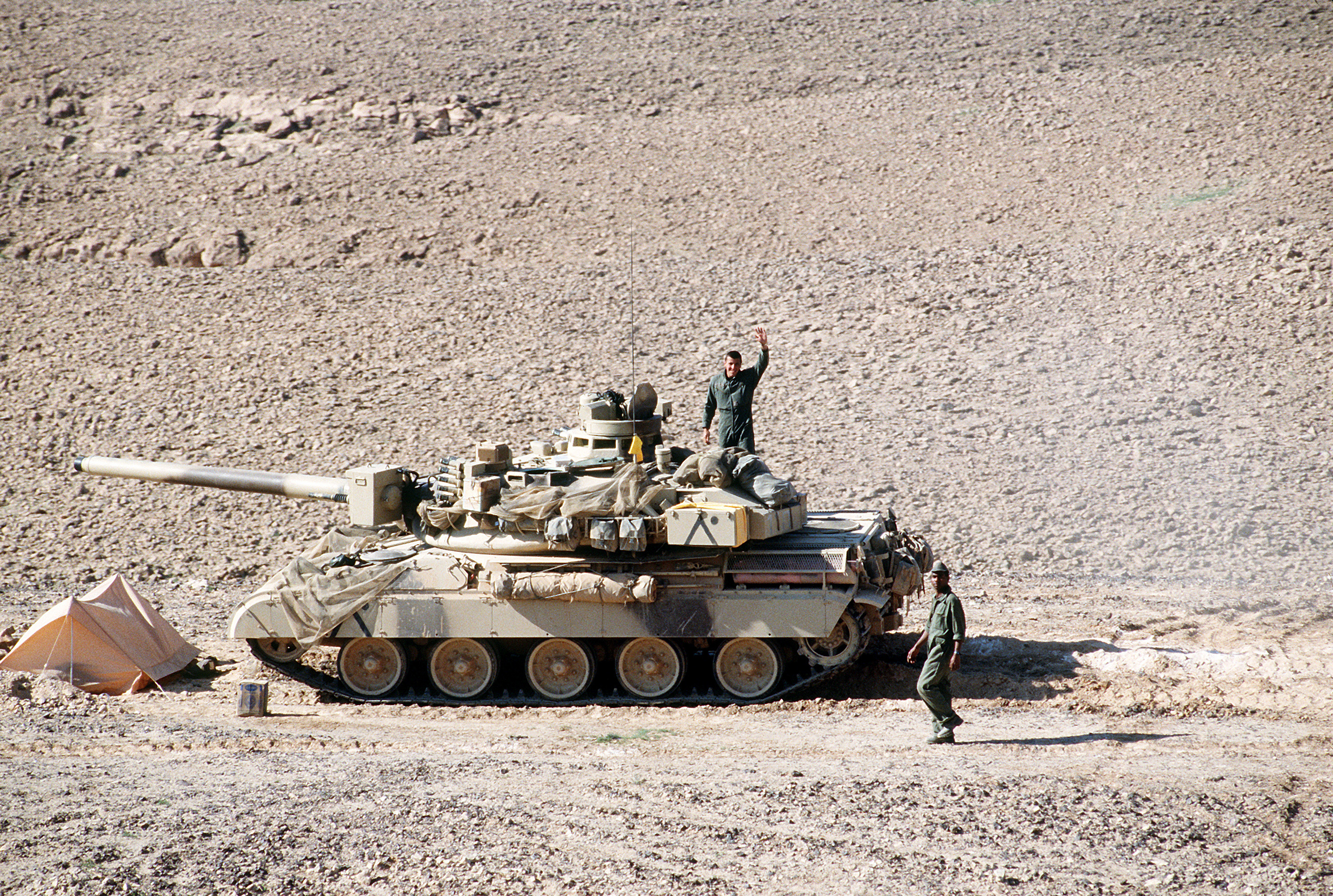
French AMX-30B2 deployed in Saudi Arabia, during military operations before the Gulf War.

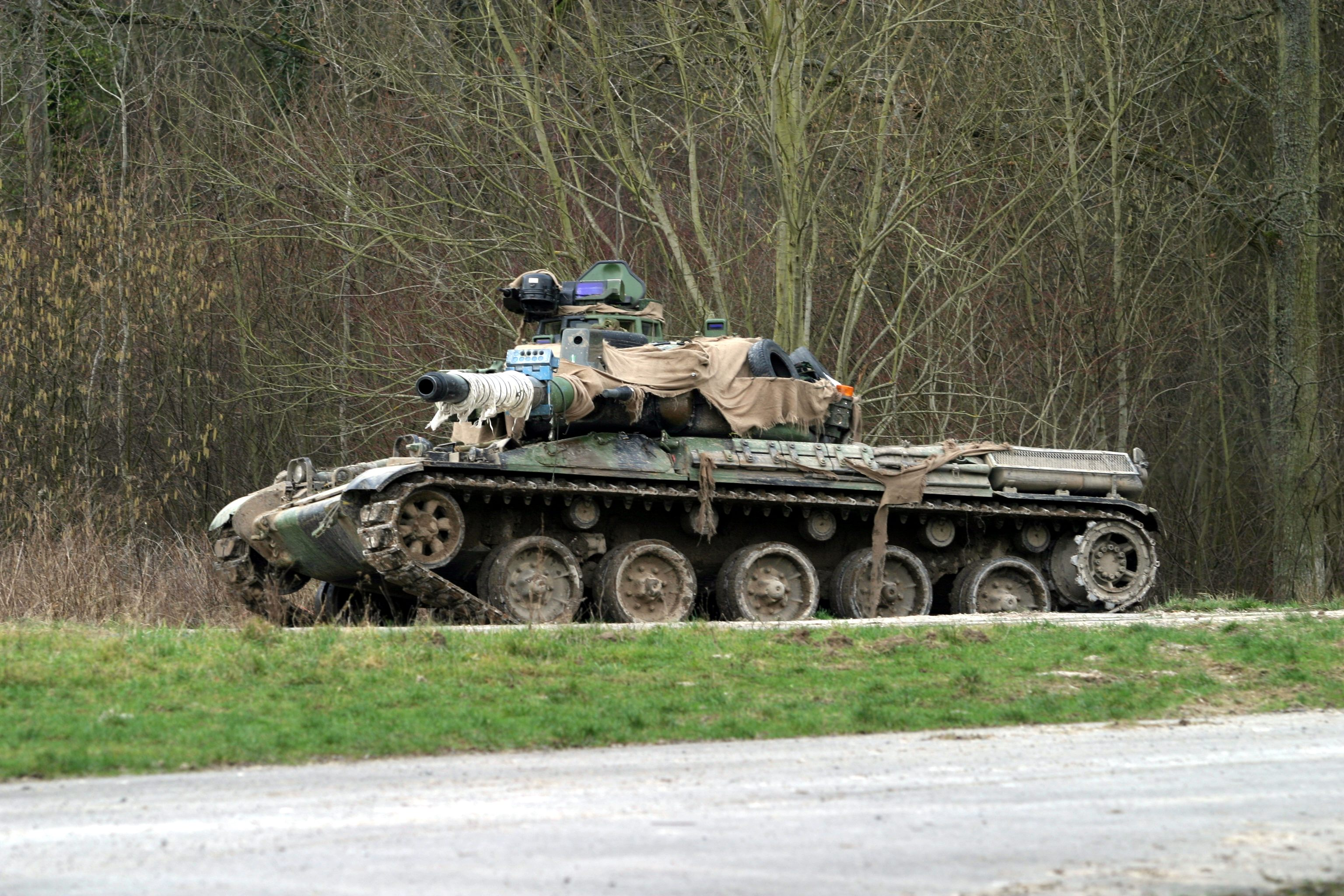
AMX-30 FORAD (Force Adverse), representing a T-72, on maneuver.

AMX-30 production occurred at the Atelier de Construction de Roanne in the town of Roanne. This heavy manufacturing factory was built during World War I to produce artillery shells, although by 1952 the factory had begun producing armoured fighting vehicles. Before producing the AMX-30, for example, it had made 1,900 AMX-13s and variants. The Roanne factory was responsible for final assembly, most components were made elsewhere: the powerplant by the Atelier de Construction de Limoges, the full armour set by the Ateliers et Forges de la Loire, the turret by the Atelier de Construction de Tarbes, the cannon by the Atelier de Construction de Bourges, the cupola and machine-gun by the Manufacture d'Armes de Saint-Étienne and the optics by the Atelier de Construction de Puteaux; all these again used many subcontractors. In a series of corporate mergers under state guidance, most of these firms would eventually be concentrated into GIAT.

Originally, 300 AMX-30s were ordered by the French Army, and by 1971 the order had been increased to 900, divided between eight batches, including all variants based on the chassis. Beginning in 1966, ten AMX-30s were assembled per month, and the first five were issued in August 1966 to the 501st Régiment de Chars de Combat. Monthly production grew to 15–20 tanks as new factories began to manufacture components of the vehicle and existing factories increased their production potential. However, in April 1969, production was again reduced to ten per month. By 1971 about 180 vehicles were in service; in 1975 delivery began of the last 143 units of the final eighth batch of the original order. In 1985 the number of AMX-30s had risen to 1173. By the end of production, France had accepted 1,355 AMX-30s into service, including 166 brand-new AMX-30B2s. Another 493 tanks were refitted and modernized to AMX-30B2 standards; originally 271 new and 820 refitted vehicles had been planned. The French Army also accepted a large number of variants, including 195 self-propelled howitzers, 44 AMX-30 Pluton tactical nuclear missile launchers, 183 AMX-30Rs, 134 AMX-30Ds and 48 engineer vehicles (AMX-30EBG). The last 35 new battle tanks were in 1989 ordered by Cyprus and the last new variant vehicles, a batch of twenty GCTs, in 1994 by France.

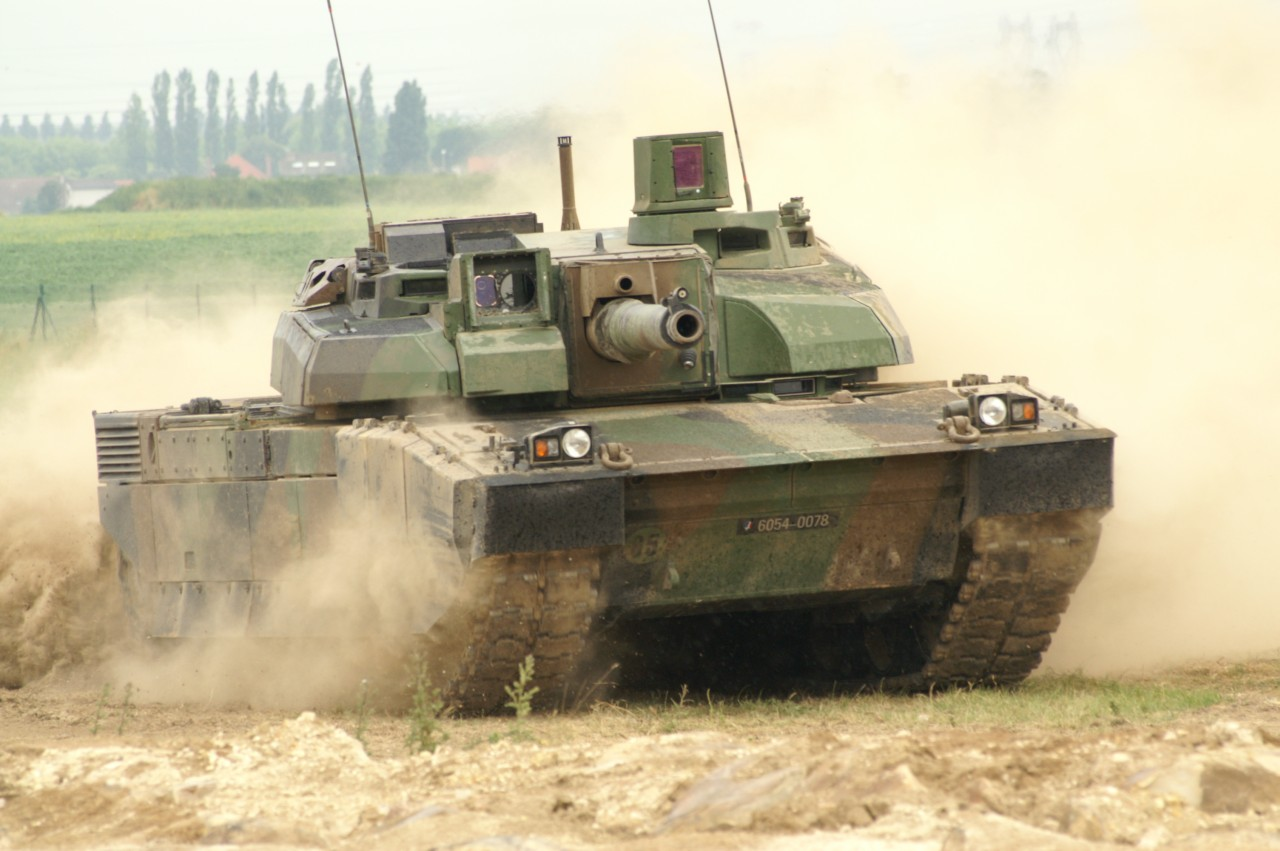
A Leclerc on maneuvers.

In the late 1990s, the French Army began to accept the new Leclerc main battle tank to replace the antiquated AMX-30. The first units to be outfitted with the new tank were the 501st and 503rd tank regiments, followed by the 6th and 12th Cuirassier Regiments.

In the early 1980s the next in the GIAT manufactured, export-driven AMX series was designed. As the AMX-32 had failed to attract any potential sales, the company decided to produce yet another upgrade. This was the AMX-40 Main Battle Tank. The development of the AMX-40 began in 1980 as a clean sheet design. In 1983 the first prototype was finished and presented at the Satory Exhibition of that year. Two further prototypes were produced in 1984; the last, fourth, was fabricated in 1985. The design was not intended for service in France, but as a successor to the AMX-32, the improved export version of the AMX-30. However the efforts to obtain foreign orders failed, the most serious potential customer to have considered the design being Spain. In 1990 it was no longer offered for export.

== Overview per tank ==
(Only tanks that were built in significant numbers are listed.)

World War I

- FCM 1A
- Renault FT
- Schneider CA1
- Saint-Chamond (tank)

Interwar period and World War II

- Char 2C
- Char D1
- Char D2
- Renault R35
- Renault R40
- FCM 36
- Char B1
- AMR 33
- AMR 35
- AMC 34
- AMC 35
- Hotchkiss H35
- SOMUA S35

Cold War

- AMX-10 RC
- AMX-13
- AMX-30
- AMX-40
- AMX-50
- ARL 44
- ARL 45

Modern era

- AMX Leclerc

== See also ==
- History of the tank
- Tanks in World War II
- Tank classification
- List of military vehicles
- French combat vehicle production during World War II

== Bibliography ==
Caiti, Pierangelo (1978). Modern Armour — The world's battle tanks today. London: Arms and Armour Press. ISBN 0-85368-412-X
