= AMC 34 =

French light tank

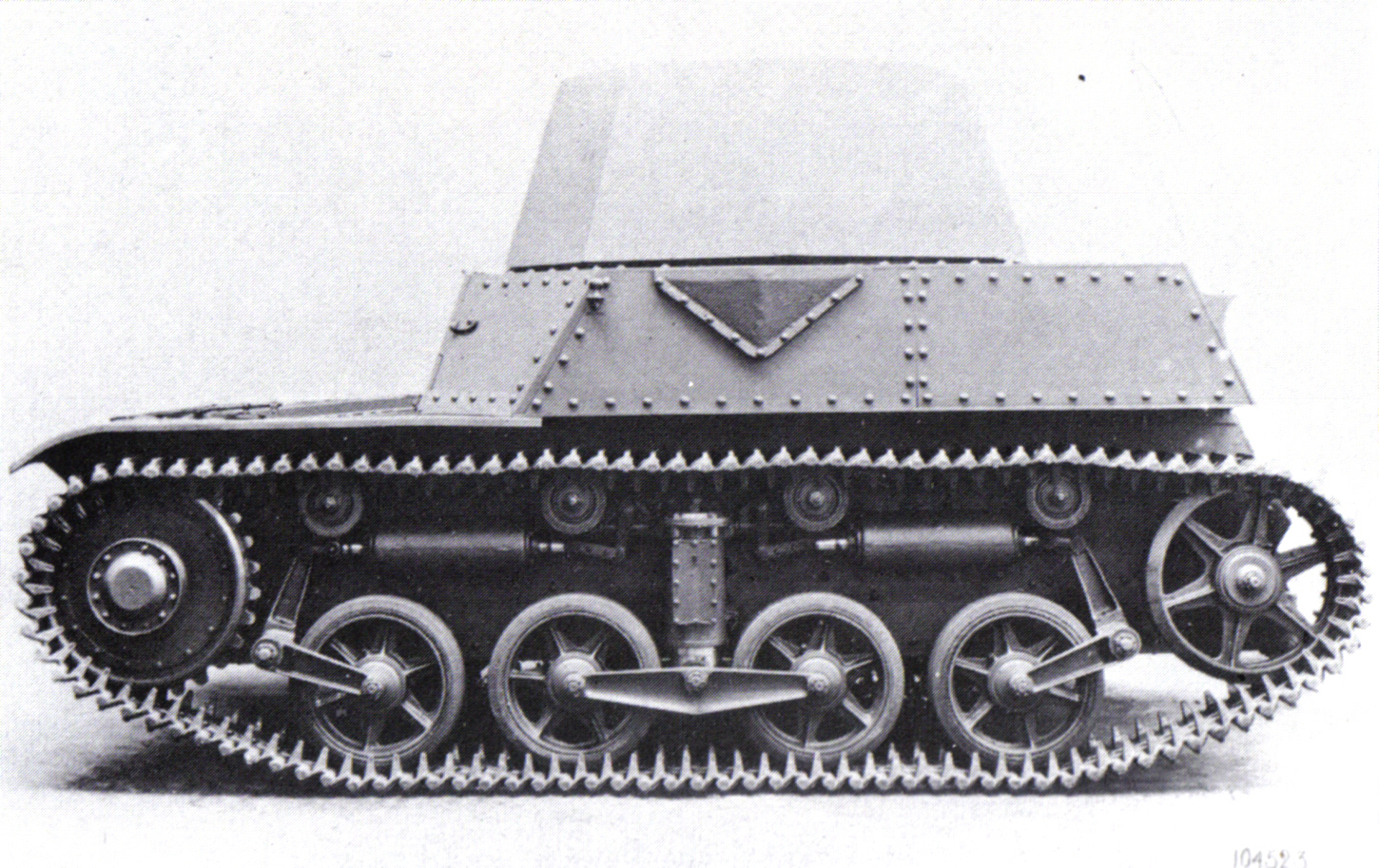
- AMC 34 prototype.
- Type: Light tank
- Place of origin: France

Production history
- Manufacturer: Renault
- No. built: 12

Specifications
- Mass: 9.7 t (9.5 long tons; 10.7 short tons) hull only
- Length: 3.98 m (13 ft 1 in)
- Width: 2.07 m (6 ft 9 in)
- Height: variable according to turret type; the hull had a height of 1.55 m (5 ft 1 in)
- Crew: two with the APX1 turret; three with the APX2
- Armor: 20 mm (0.79 in)
- Main armament: 47mm SA 34 anti-tank gun(with the APX1 turret); later a 25 mm gun (with the APX2 turret)
- Secondary armament: MAC 1931 coaxial machine gun
- Engine: 7.125 litre V-8; 120 hp (89 kW)
- Suspension: vertically sprung bogie and two horizontally sprung road wheels per side
- Operational range: 200 km (120 mi)
- Maximum speed: 40 km/h (25 mph)

The AMC 34 was a French tank originally built for the French Army's cavalry units. Its production was cut short, and the few vehicles produced were out of service by the time of the Battle of France in the Second World War.

== Development ==
Alarmed by the rapid build-up of the Red Army, the French Army, on 24 December 1931, conceived a preliminary plan for the mechanisation of the Cavalry. This foresaw the development of several types of automitrailleuses — the official term for cavalry tanks because chars ("tanks") were by law part of the infantry arm — among which an Automitrailleuse de Combat (AMC), a lightly armoured (weighing no more than nine tons) but swift (30 km/h cruise speed) and strongly armed (47 mm gun) combat tank, capable of fighting enemy armour. The plan was affirmed by the French Supreme Command on 23 January 1932, and approved by the ministry of defence on 9 December.

Even before Plan 1931 was put on paper, Louis Renault was informed of its probable contents. In the autumn of 1931, he ordered his design team to build an AMC. The team proposed to use welded steel plates, but Renault refused as this entailed hiring expensive professional welders. Nevertheless, the team took the initiative to build the Renault VO, a fully welded prototype of a Char Rapide, that could also serve as an alternative for the AMR 33 developed at the same time. When the vehicle was finished in 1932, Renault was charmed by the proposal, but after long consideration decided against it and ordered a riveted version to be built. This quickly proved to be much too heavy and this caused a complete redesign of the project into a much smaller vehicle, the Renault YR, which was presented to the French materiel commission, the Commission de Vincennes, on 12 October 1933, still fitted with the welded turret of the Renault VO. After testing by the Section Technique de la Cavalerie the prototype was improved by installing larger fuel tanks and a stronger clutch and gearbox. On 9 March 1934, an order was made for a pre-series of twelve hulls of the AMC 34; later a choice would be made from the range of standard turrets. The first was delivered on 17 October 1935.

== Description ==
The AMC 34 is a small vehicle with a length of 3.98 m and a width of 2.07 m. The suspension of the prototype is identical to that of the AMR 33; the production vehicles use a type that was originally envisaged for the AMR 35: a central bogie with a vertical spring; two other wheels in front and behind with an oil-dampened horizontal spring. The engine, a 7.125 litre V-8 120 hp with a fuel tank of 220 litres rendering a top speed of 40 km/h and a range of 200 kilometers, is located on the right; the driver on the left with a hatch in front of him and an escape door behind him. The armour is 20 mm on the vertical plates; the weight — of the hull only — 9.7 metric tons.

== Operational history ==
=== Plan 1934 ===
Before the first vehicle was even delivered, it was decided on 26 June 1934, as part of the Plan 1934 to improve both quantity and quality of French tank production, to change the specifications for an AMC: its armour had to be immune to anti-tank guns. As the AMC 34 was not strong enough to carry the extra weight it was redesigned into the AMC 35. No more orders of the original type were made.

=== France and Morocco ===
AMC 34 of the 1er Régiment de Chasseurs d'Afrique, in Rabat on July 14, 1939.

France, however, had such a dearth of modern tanks that it could not afford to forget the twelve pre-series vehicles. In January 1936 they were taken into use with the 4th Cuirasssiers, at first fitted with gun turrets removed from Renault FTs and then with the APX1-CE turret also used for the Char D2s, armed with an SA 34 47 mm gun. By 1937 the growing production of more modern tanks allowed the AMC 34 hulls to be shipped from France to Morocco to be used by the 1er Régiment Chasseurs d'Afrique (1 RCA), which received them on 15 December 1937. They were at the time the most modern armoured vehicles in the colonies, but were refitted with the two-man APX2 turret. It took many months before 25 mm guns could be fitted as well; until that time the tanks drove around with just the 7.5 mm machine guns. The tanks used the ER 28 short wave radio (all AMCs were supposed to have radio sets); also a better protected fuel tank at the back was installed together with a safer horizontal ventilation grille on the back engine deck. In November 1939 the AMC 34 was replaced by the "H 39"; three vehicles were taken by 5 RCA and used for driver training. These and the other nine vehicles do not appear on the armistice control lists, so they were either already scrapped in the summer of 1940 or hidden.

=== Order by Belgium ===
In 1935 the Belgian cavalry started a mechanisation programme. It was planned to equip all six cavalry regiments with an organic squadron of twelve tanks: eight T-15 and four guntanks. To fill the latter position on 13 September 1935, 25 AMC 34 hulls were ordered with Renault, at a unit price of 360,000 French francs, and 25 turrets with APX. The AMC 34 had been chosen over the competing Vickers Medium Tank Mark F after testing the prototype from 7 until 10 November 1934. It was stipulated that the production vehicles would be of an improved configuration and be delivered in a rate of three per month from October 1935 onwards. However, due to technical and financial problems, Renault was unable to deliver. Only after a delay of over three years, ten hulls were exported of the more modern AGCI1 or AMC 35. The ordered APX2 turrets were refitted with Belgian 47 mm guns and 7.65 mm Hotchkiss machine guns; thirteen were used on coastal defence pillboxes.

== See also ==
- Tanks in France
