= AMC 35 =

French medium cavalry tank

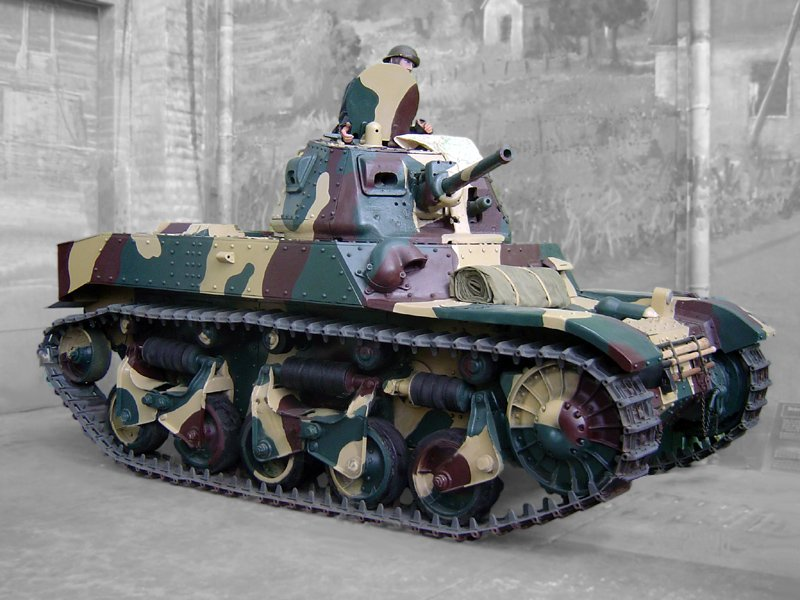
- ACG1, displayed at the Musée des Blindés, Saumur, France.
- Type: Cavalry tank
- Place of origin: France

Service history
- Used by: France; Belgium; Germany
- Wars: Second World War

Production history
- Designer: Renault
- Designed: 1934
- Manufacturer: Renault, AMX
- Unit cost: ₣ 360,000 per hull
- Produced: November 1938 - January 1940
- No. built: at least 57
- Variants: ACG 2

Specifications
- Mass: 14,500 kg (32,000 lb; 14.3 long tons)
- Length: 4.572 m (15 ft 0 in)
- Width: 2.235 m (7 ft 4.0 in)
- Height: 2.336 m (7 ft 8.0 in)
- Crew: 3 (commander, gunner, driver)
- Armor: 25 mm (0.98 in)
- Main armament: 47 mm SA 35 L/32 gun or FRC 47 mm
- Secondary armament: coaxial 7.5 mm Reibel machine gun or 7.65 mm Hotchkiss
- Engine: Renault water-cooled 4-cylinder petrol engine 180 hp (130 kW)
- Power/weight: 12.4 hp/tonne
- Suspension: horizontally rubber-sprung scissors bogies
- Fuel capacity: 300 L (66 imp gal)
- Operational range: 161 km (100 mi)
- Maximum speed: 42 km/h (26 mph)

The AMC 35 (from Automitrailleuse de Combat Renault modèle 1935), also known under a manufacturer's designation Renault ACG-1, was a French medium cavalry tank of the later Interwar era that served in the Second World War. It was developed as a result of the change of the specification that had led to the design of the AMC 34, calling for a vehicle that was not only well-armed and mobile but also well-armoured. Due to technological and financial problems production was delayed and limited. The AMC 35 was one of the few French tanks of the period featuring a two-man turret.

== Development ==
Renault had developed the AMC 34 according to the specifications of the Plan 1931. On 26 June 1934 these were changed: it was now demanded that the vehicle attain a maximum speed of 50 km/h (31 mph) and be immune to anti-tank guns. On 7 March 1936 a changed prototype was delivered by Renault, who requested that the vehicle would be accepted if it met the new specifications; after all the AMC 34 had already been accepted for production and this was nothing but a slightly changed variant. The French materiel commission, the Commission de Vincennes, became suspicious however by the fact that the factory designation had been changed from Renault YR to Renault ACG. When the commission inspected the prototype on 9 March it transpired that it was actually a completely new design. Accordingly, a complete test programme was ordered, which was finished on 27 November. At that date the commission judged that despite many changes the type was still unfit for service due to its mechanical unreliability. However already in the spring the Cavalry, worried by the German remilitarization of the Rhineland, had first ordered seventeen vehicles and later expanded that order to fifty. For political reasons the commission did not dare to cancel the order; it accepted the type, noting that it would be highly advisable to test types in future before ordering them. The first vehicle was received by the Cavalry on 1 November 1938.

== Description ==
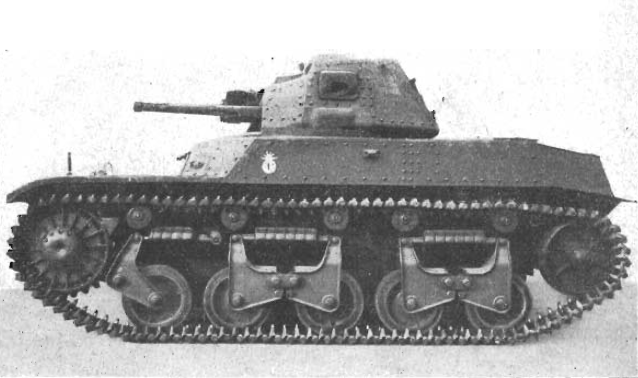
Side view of the AMC 35

The AMC 35 had about the same dimensions as the AMC 34, but the hull was longer at 4572 mm to install a shortened 11.08 litres V-4 180 hp version of the V-6 engine used in the Char B1. There were five road wheels. The suspension used horizontal rubber cylinders as springs. At 42 km/h the vehicle was slower than the specified speed. A three hundred litre fuel tank allowed for a range of 160 kilometres. The wading capacity was sixty centimetres and it could cross a trench of two metres. The 25 mm armour plates, riveted and bolted onto the chassis, did not offer the demanded protection.

The prototype had a two-man APX2 turret, with the commander/loader on the left and the gunner on the right, fitted with a 25 mm SARF fortress gun and a 7.5 mm Reibel machine gun. As the 25 mm anti-tank guns were needed in the Maginot Line, in the production series the 47 mm SA 35 gun was used. The roughly octagonal APX2 turret consisted of cast sections, welded, riveted and bolted together. The tank carried 120 gun rounds and 5250 machine gun rounds.

== Production and export ==
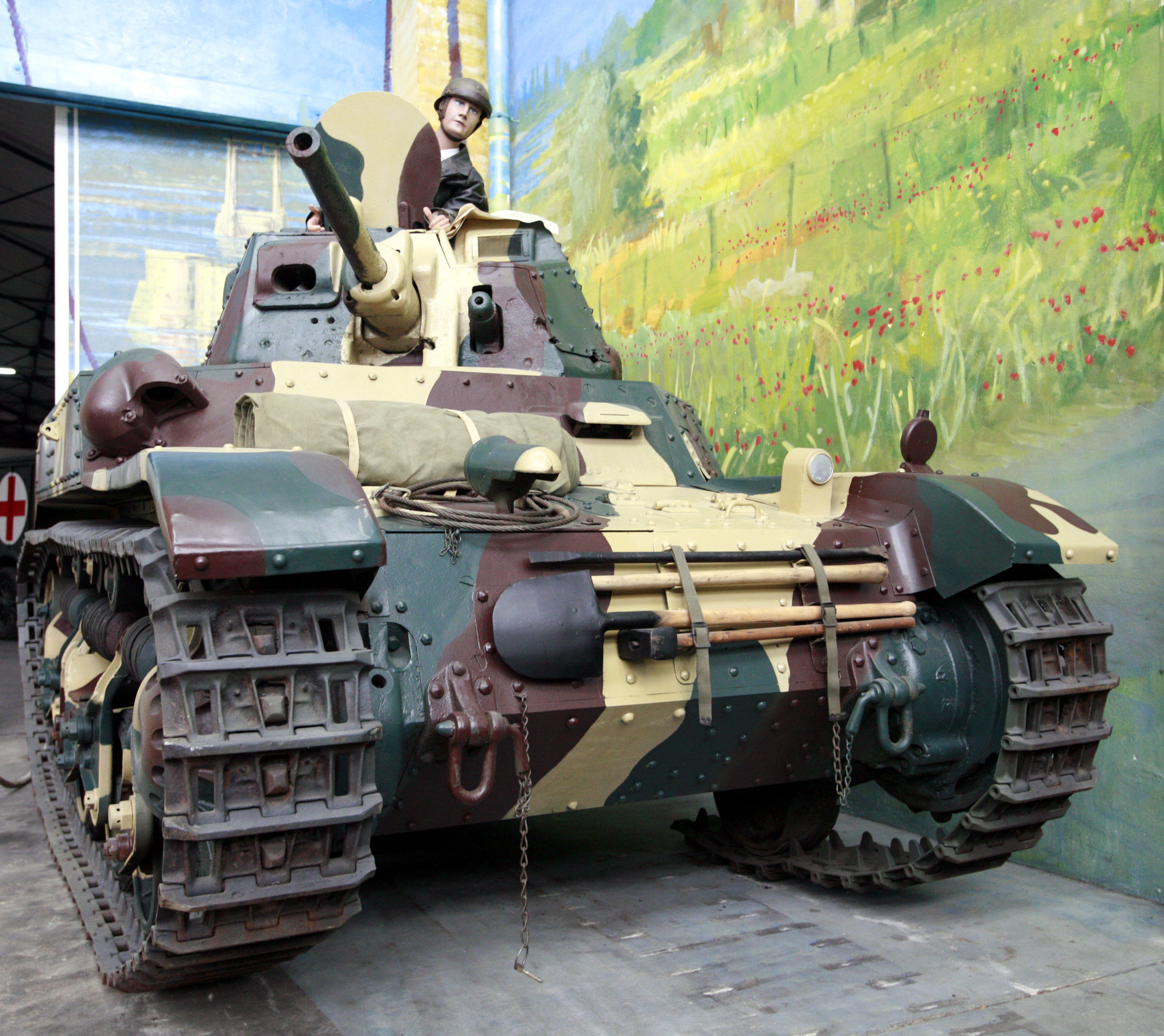
AMC 35 on display at the Musée des Blindés in Saumur

The Belgian Army had ordered 25 AMC 34 hulls with Renault on 13 September 1935 at a unit price of 360,000 French francs, together with a matching number of APX2 turrets to be delivered by Batignolles-Châtillon, for a total project budget of 18.5 million Belgian francs. The hulls were indicated to be of a "second series", an improved AMC 34 — referring to the same line of development that would result in the AMC 35. Their delivery was supposed to commence in October 1935. However, that month Renault started production of the original AMC 34; it was as yet unable to manufacture the improved version. Technological, financial and social problems — in December 1936 the military division of Renault was nationalised and restructured into the new AMX-factory — ensured that for 1936 also, delivery would be delayed. As large orders had become unlikely, the project had a low priority.

On 3 June 1937 the Belgian minister of defence, General Henri Denis, demanded that the single prototype be sent to Belgium; it was transported on 4 June. After testing between 23 and 27 August showed that its climbing abilities were poor, the Belgians decided that the seven tanks intended for the Chasseurs Ardennais were unnecessary and reduced the order accordingly to eighteen. The arrival of the prototype had caused a political row however: politicians from the right feared it would antagonise Hitler and so endanger Belgian neutrality; those from the left wanted only purely defensive weapons. As deliveries failed to materialise, in December 1937 it was decided to annul the order completely, to accept a contractual fine of four million franc and to redirect the remaining budget to the production of home-made T-13 tank destroyers.

This outcome however, embarrassed the French government: it pressured Renault to accept a new arrangement. Early in 1938 it transpired that the Renault factory had in its possession the materials to build the original total of 75 tanks; out of these stocks parts sufficient for about sixty tanks had already been manufactured; assembly had started on about fifty vehicles. It was agreed on 21 April 1938 to complete 35 vehicles, ten to be delivered to Belgium including the prototype, the countervalue of its contractual fine. Belgium also was to receive five sets of reserve parts and eight armour sets. The new contract was signed on 15 June; it stipulated that the Belgian tanks would be delivered prior to 31 July. At that moment the French Cavalry no longer itself intended to use the type (but the SOMUA S35 instead) and advised that priority should be given to the Belgian order. Renault had asked permission for this on 6 May, but on 2 June the French Ministry of Defence responded that the terms of the original agreements should be followed; these entailed a split delivery of batches of ten at a time: first seven tanks for France, followed by three for Belgium.

Series production only started in November 1938 and actual delivery of the first three vehicles to Belgium was delayed till 30 March 1939, the second batch was exported in May and the final three vehicles arrived on 7 August.

In 1938 the turrets also were delivered. As there was now a surplus of fifteen, these were used on fortifications: thirteen of these on coastal defence pillboxes; another two turrets were installed on pillboxes at Remouchamps where a fortress was initially intended to be built, but due to the lack of funds only two casemates were constructed. The turrets were equipped by Belgium with a different armament: instead of the French SA 35 gun, a Belgian FRC 47 mm gun was fitted; this closely related type had a barrel that was 15 mm shorter. Also the machine gun was different: an optionally coaxial 7,65mm rechambered Hotchkiss (Maxim) 08/15 MG. The Belgian turrets were produced at Nantes as the APX2 B, which had the diascope on the left side moved to the facet behind, because the drum magazine for the 7.65mm Maxim 08/15 machine gun made it impossible to look through it in the original position. Older sources incorrectly claim that a 13.2 mm Hotchkiss machine gun was fitted. An armour plate was welded over the hole. They were rebuilt at Ghent by the SEM (Société d'Électricité et de Mécanique Van den Kerckhove & Carels) between September 1939 and February 1940.

For France also, production continued after 1 November 1938, with final assembly at AMX; in March 1939 the original order of seventeen was finished; at the beginning of the Second World War a number of 22 had been reached. Production then accelerated: three were built in September, nine in October, eight in November. For this production all remaining materials were used, apparently to fulfill the original order: when in December the Belgian Army asked for the delivery of the spare parts, as it needed some tanks in working order to allow a single platoon to take part in the winter manoeuvres, Renault was unable to provide these. In January 1940 five were produced. Production was then discontinued for a total of 57. Ten had been exported to Belgium, 47 remained in France where they are listed in this number in the spring of 1940. It is unclear whether this includes prototypes and project tanks and how the number can be reconciled with the total order of fifty.

After the war it has for some time been thought that the total production had been a hundred: 75 for France, 25 for Belgium. This mistake had its origins in the events during the infamous process of Riom where the Vichy regime indicted many for their presumed failure in preparing the French Army for war. The accused, eager to show that French tank production was in fact much higher than that of Germany, estimated the AMC 35 production at 75, apparently adding the number of the Belgian AMC 34 order to the order for France. Later writers, assuming that 75 was the number of tanks intended for France, repeated this mistake and added another 25 Belgian tanks.

== Operational history ==
=== Belgium ===
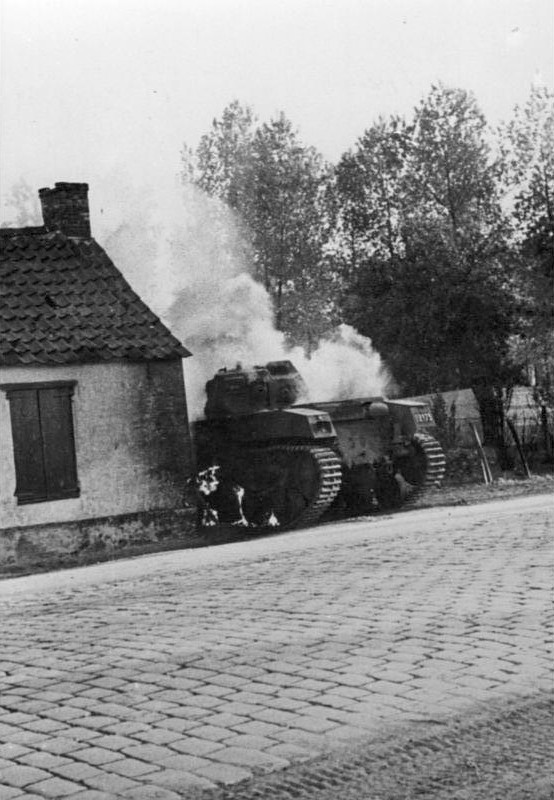
One of the Belgian vehicles burning in May 1940

When all nine hulls had at last arrived in Belgium, it was soon discovered that engine, transmission and suspension wear was excessive. In January 1940 the two tanks that were in the worst condition were selected for transport to the arsenal of Etterbeek, to be cannibalised to keep the others running; one was used for driver training.

The eight remaining tanks were concentrated in the Escadron d'Auto Blindés du Corps de Cavelerie, literally the "Armoured Car Squadron of the Cavalry Corps", which was created on 1 September 1939 at Watermael-Boitsfort. The term Auto Blindé Lourd/ Zware Pantserwagen, or "Heavy Armoured Car," was used to avoid the politically sensitive char or "tank". The unit then moved to Ghent for its first training, gradually receiving more vehicles from Carels. Later it moved back to Brussels. The squadron had three platoons: one platoon "Staff and Services" (hors rang) and two platoons of four tanks each. The personnel were a mixture of soldiers of the 2nd Lancers Regiment (the Dutch-speaking 2e Lansiers) and the francophone 1st Guides Regiment, both units sharing the same barracks (Caserne de Witte-de Haelen) at Etterbeek.

When war broke out on 10 May, the driver training tank was united with the seven others to bring the squadron to its organic strength of eight. These fought against the German Army between 17 and 27 May 1940. Four were destroyed by 37 mm Pak fire when counter-attacking, two broke down and two were surrendered to the German on 28 May 1940 when the Belgian army put down its weapons.

The Museum of the Army in Brussels shows a single turret taken from one of the two pillboxes that defended the harbour of Zeebrugge or Port of Bruges-Zeebrugge. The turret is property of the city of Bruges which loaned it to the Army Museum at Brussels for 99 years.

=== France ===
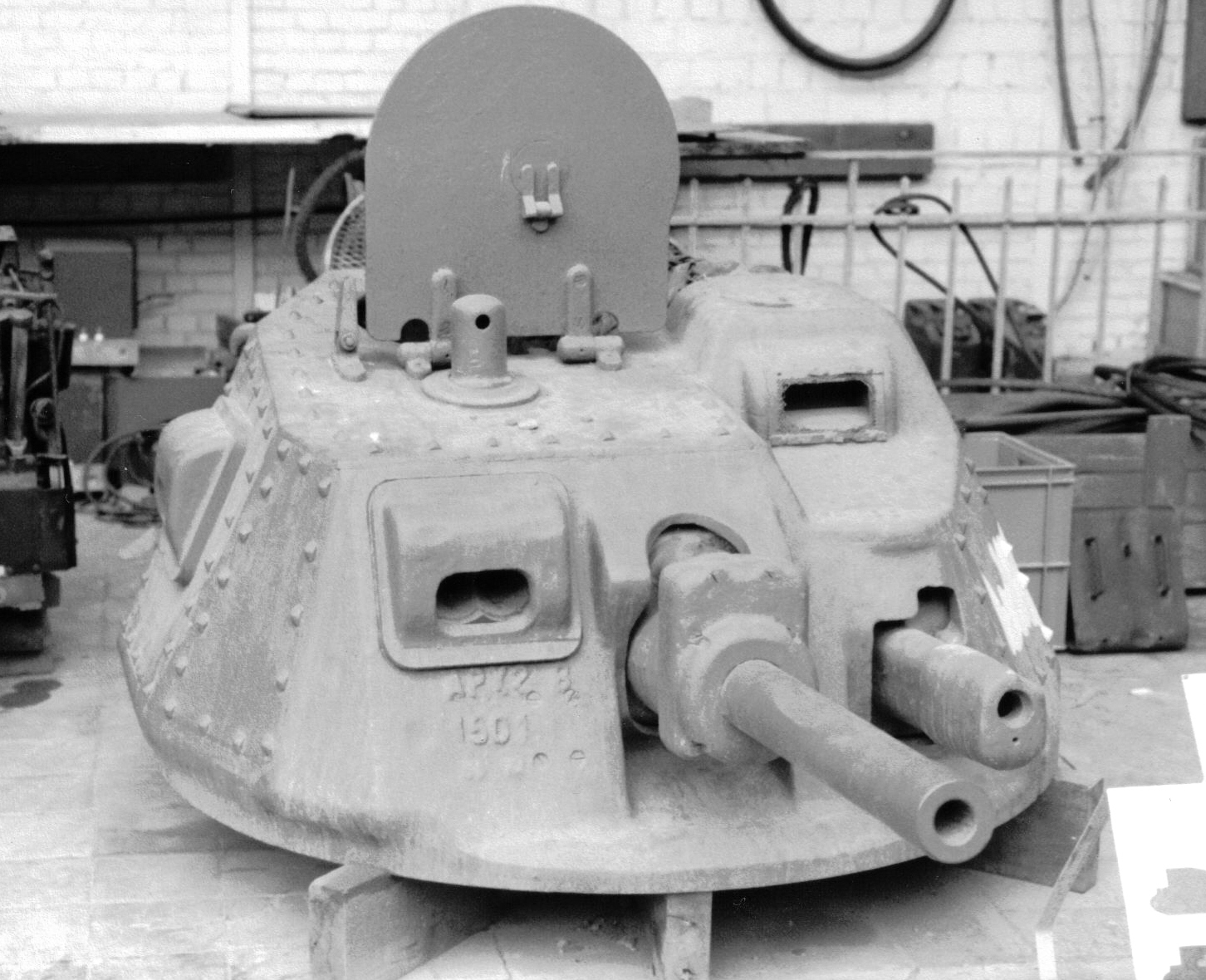
The APX2-B turret from Zeebrugge, preserved in the Army Museum of Brussels

At first no French units were equipped with the AMC 35; no crews were trained on the type. After the German breakthrough at Sedan it was decided on 15 May to send the entire tank materiel reserve to the frontline. Several ad hoc-units were hastily formed. First twelve AMC 35s were used to equip the 11e Groupement de Cavalerie; then five even more informal Corps-francs Motorisés were formed, each to be equipped with seven tanks, but only five AMC 35s could at first be made ready for them; seven more were later delivered. The crews reported that the materiel was unreliable, and suffered from an extremely short range in rough terrain. The CFMs fought a delaying battle between the rivers Seine and Loire.

In the anglophone literature the AMC 35 is often portrayed as a major failed chance for France to turn the tide against Germany: its two-man turret is then seen as better adapted to the demands of modern manoeuvre warfare. E.g. armour historian Brian Terence White judged the type very favourably:

... one of the most advanced French tanks for its size in that as well as being equipped with a good gun it had a two-man turret ... with all the advantages in command it conferred. ... somewhat surprisingly, for in retrospect this seems to have been one of the best prewar French light tank designs, only 100 were built.

The type can, however, be interpreted as an excellent example of the design constraints that forced France to adopt one man-turrets on its other tanks: the price for the AMC 35's roomy turret was an unreliable and, for the medium tank rôle, woefully underarmoured vehicle.

The wreck of an AMC 35 has been salvaged and restored at the Musée des Blindés at Saumur, where it has been displayed since 2006.

=== Germany ===
Vehicles captured by Germany during the Fall of France were used by the Wehrmacht as the PzKpfw AMC 738 (f) or (b) - depending on whether captured from French or Belgians respectively - for driver training.

== Projects ==
One prototype was built of a smoke-laying vehicle; an AMC 35 hull was rebuilt and fitted with nineteen containers, each with 165 litres of smoke fluid, that could be sprayed into the air by a compressor.

One AMC 35 hull was built as a 75 mm tank destroyer, the Renault ACG-2. The original AMC 35 was therefore in French sources of the period often called the Renault ACG-1.

== See also ==
- Tanks in France

== Literature ==
- Georges E. Mazy, 2008, "Les Autos Blindés Lourds du Corps de Cavalerie Belge 1940", Histoire de Guerre, Blindés & Matériel, N°84, pp. 18–29
