= ARL V 39 =

ARL V939 1940/ ARL 40
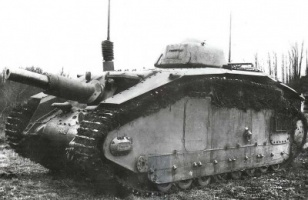
- Type: Assault gun
- Place of origin: France

Service history
- In service: No active military service

Production history
- Designed: 1935
- Manufacturer: ARL (Atelier de Construction de Rueil)
- Produced: 1938–1940
- No. built: 2 complete, unknown in uncompleted stages
- Variants: 2–3 intended

Specifications
- Mass: 25 tonnes (25 long tons; 28 short tons)
- Length: 5.80 m (19.0 ft)
- Width: 2.57 m (8.4 ft)
- Height: 2.45 m (8.0 ft)
- Crew: 5 (commander, driver, gunner, loader, radio operator)
- Armor: 50 mm (2.0 in)
- Main armament: Modified 75mm model 1929 casemate High-power APX
- Secondary armament: 7.5 mm MAC 1931 Châtellerault
- Engine: 6-Renault Ts; 190 hp (140 kW) – 250 hp (190 kW)
- Transmission: 5 forward, 1 reverse
- Suspension: bogies with a mixture of vertical coil and leaf springs
- Ground clearance: Approximately 0.35 m (1.1 ft)
- Maximum speed: 42 km/h (26 mph) (Final production vehicles estimated to reach up to 50 km/h (31 mph))

The ARL V 39, also known as the ARL 1940 V939 40, was a prototype armored fighting vehicle, designed to meet France's demands for a new self-propelled assault gun, prior to World War II. Only two complete and functional prototypes were produced, armed with a modified 75mm field gun and 7.5mm machine gun. The design project was known as ARL 40, related to the char G1B medium tank. Designed in 1935, two prototypes were completed by 1940. However, due to the later occupation of France, mass production to meet orders was canceled and the prototypes evacuated to Morocco, ceasing any further development of the project.

== Development ==
Development of the project was started in mid-1935, arising from France's proposal for a new self-propelled, infantry support assault gun. Having no existing tanks of this type in service, two manufacturers submitted designs built upon existing medium tanks: SOMUA, with the Somua S40 based on the chassis of the SOMUA S35 medium cavalry tank, and ARL, with the ARL 40, developed using parts from the Char B1 heavy tank.

The ARL V 39 was the only vehicle fully developed to meet the specification of the ARL 40 project, the first vehicle constructed of a soft steel was completed in June 1938, with military testing taking place 23–25 March 1939. Passing trials successfully, the project was approved for mass production with an initial order of 72 units, of which 24 were to be unarmed command vehicles.

On 27 September, the unit distribution was changed to groups of 12 vehicles, divided into two groups consisting of two three-vehicle batteries, with additional command vehicles granted to each group. In October 1939, France's Prime Minister, Édouard Daladier, placed the revised order, the first five to be ready for service by October 1940, then to be proceeded by a production rate of 10 per month. However, at the beginning of the Battle of France in May 1940, no vehicle was combat ready, two working prototypes were shipped to Morocco to be hidden in a tunnel. The vehicles are confirmed to have reached Africa, but their fate beyond that is unknown. The future occupation of France then saw a cease in any further development in the ARL 40 project.

SOMUA's S40 project also passed trials and was simultaneously granted a 36 unit order, 12 of which were to be unarmed command vehicles, which initially were to be allocated to battalions alongside the ARL V 39. However, problems arose with the SAu 40 when adopting the 75mm high-power APX gun used by the ARL V 39, leading to the order of 36 to be canceled on 1 May 1940. Instead the initial role was to be left to the ARL V 39, giving the SAu 40 the new role of tank destroyer using the 47mm mle 1937 artillery gun. Seventy-two SAu 40's were ordered in this configuration, but never reached production.

== Armament ==
The ARL V 39 mounted the 75mm high-velocity APX gun. It was a modification of the 75mm 1929 casemate fortress gun. Muzzle velocity reached 400 m/s for high explosive rounds and 570 m/s for armor-piercing rounds. Penetration tests found that the armor-piercing shell had 50 mm of penetration at 1,000 metres (3,300 ft). Instrumentation included two sight and stereoscopic rangefinders, allowing for shots at up to 2,000 metres (6,600 ft) distance. Traverse angles were 7° left and right and -10° to 30° vertically. When transporting the gun barrel could be drawn into the body to reduce the total length. The gun had a semi-automatic breech mechanism, automatic charging, and a data recorder.
