= AMX 40 cruiser tank =

Proposed French cavalry tank of WW2

AMX 40
- Type: Cruiser tank
- Place of origin: France

Production history
- Designer: Joseph Molinié
- Designed: 1938-1940
- Manufacturer: Ateliers de construction d'Issy-les-Moulineaux

Specifications
- Mass: 16–18 t (35,000–40,000 lb)
- Length: 5.33 m (17 ft 6 in)
- Width: 2.45 m (8 ft 0 in)
- Height: 2.37 m (7 ft 9 in)
- Crew: 3 (commander/gunner, driver, loader)
- Armor: 60 mm equivalent (turret and front); 30-50 mm (hull sides) + 15 mm sponsons 40 mm (lower hull) sides + 15 mm side skirts 25 mm (double bottom)
- Main armament: 47 mm SA 35 gun (176 rounds)
- Secondary armament: 7.5 mm MAC 1931 coaxial machine gun, 7.5 mm MAC 1934 anti-aircraft machine gun (4000 rounds)
- Engine: Aster two-stroke diesel engine 160 hp (120 kW) (4-cylinder) or 220 hp (160 kW) (6-cylinder)
- Transmission: RVR automatic
- Suspension: Christie
- Fuel capacity: 400 liters
- Operational range: >500 km (310 mi)
- Maximum speed: 45–50 km/h (28–31 mph)
- Steering system: controlled differential

The AMX 40 was a proposed French cruiser tank. It was intended to replace the SOMUA S35 and S40 tanks. The tank never went beyond design stage after the fall of France to Nazi Germany in 1940.

== Development history ==
In April 1939, a French military mission led by General Martin visited the British military. They were impressed by the British Cruiser Mk III and decided to make an improved cavalry tank based on it which would later be known as AMX 40.

After the start of World War II, development of the AMX 40 commenced in March 1940 under the leadership of Joseph Molinié from Ateliers de construction d'Issy-les-Moulineaux. The AMX 40 was a cruiser tank, planned to be a successor to the SOMUA S35 and SOMUA S40. However, in July 1940, the design was discontinued after the Fall of France.

== Design ==
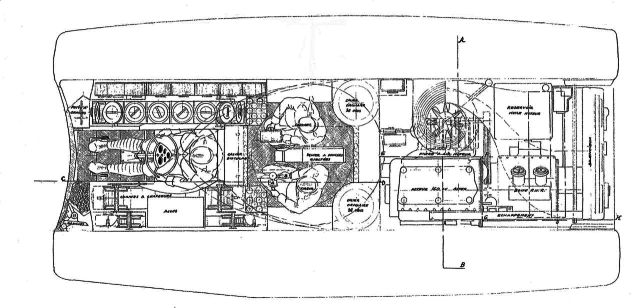
Top view of AMX 40

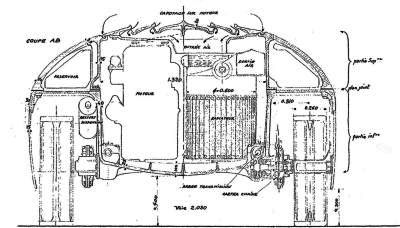
Rear view of AMX 40

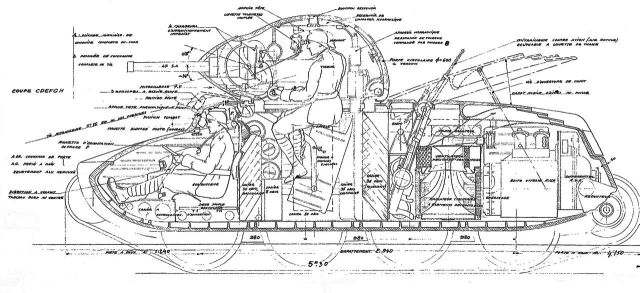
AMX 40 cutaway

The AMX 40 was ahead of its time in some aspects; the hull and turret were well sloped and had no straight angles. The tank was manned by a crew of 3.

=== Hull and turret ===
The AMX 40 was designed to be approximately 33 cm wider than the S35 while maintaining approximately the same length, which improved its handling. Construction was entirely cast. The frontal armor had a nominal thickness of 60mm, although surviving drawings suggest that the heavily sloped upper glacis was somewhat thinner. The side armor ranged from 30mm to 50mm and the rear armor was 40mm.

The two-man egg-shaped turret had two openings for the optical rangefinder. The turret ring diameter was of only 90 cm. There was a circular access hatch of 60 cm in diameter at the rear of the turret. There were no vision slits for the turret of the AMX 40.

=== Armament ===
The planned main armament was a 47 mm SA 35 gun. 176 rounds were stowed in the fighting compartment in rotary and tilting magazines in order to be reached quickly.

Secondary armament included two 7.5mm machine guns; one coaxial machine gun and one anti-aircraft defence machine gun mounted on a retractable ball mount behind the turret. Up to 30 magazines were stored in a large belt mechanism to the right of the driver. It was believed that this system would allow the loader to continuously grab magazines without needing to crawl around inside the hull.

=== Engine ===
The AMX 40 was supposed to use a 160 hp (120 kW) two-stroke Aster diesel engine similar to the one used on the AMX 38. The choice of diesel fuel significantly increased safety by preventing ignition at room temperature.

The engine horsepower was noticeably less than the SOMUA S35 (190 hp (140 kW)) and SOMUA S40 (220 hp (160 kW)), despite the fact that the tank's weight was close to the SOMUA S35. A 220 hp (160 kW), six-cylinder version of the Aster engine was under development

=== Running gear ===
The chassis had eight road wheels of 82 cm diameter, on a horizontally-sprung Christie suspension. There were no return rollers. The road wheels were protected by 15 mm steel side skirts.

Like many tanks fitted with Christie suspensions, the AMX 40 was a "convertible tank"; in the event of a broken track, the crew could remove the tracks and use the two rear-wheel drives, allowing the tank to travel at high speeds on roads. In wheeled mode, the tank was steered by pivoting the two front road wheels.

=== Communications, optics, and crew ===
The AMX 40 was to be equipped with a radio. Vision was achieved by a panoramic periscope located on the top of the turret.
