= Char G1 =

French medium tank project of the 1930s

- Type: Tank
- Place of origin: France

Specifications
- Mass: ~20–35 metric tons, i.e. tonnes
- Length: ~5.57 m
- Width: ~2.94 m
- Height: ~2.8 m
- Crew: 4
- Armor: 60 mm
- Main armament: 75mm SA 35 L/32
- Secondary armament: Two MAC 1931 machine guns: one coaxial and one in the commander's cupola
- Engine: petrol ~280–450 hp
- Power/weight: unspecified
- Suspension: unspecified
- Operational range: ~200–400 km
- Maximum speed: 40 km/h

The Char G1 was a French replacement project for the Char D2 medium tank. Several prototypes from different companies were developed from 1936 onwards, but not a single one had been fully completed at the time of the Fall of France in 1940. The projects represented some of the most advanced French tank design of the period and finally envisaged a type that would have been roughly equal in armament and mobility to later World War II standard tanks of other nations, such as the Soviet T-34 and the American M4 Sherman, but possessing several novel features, such as gun stabilisation, a semi-automatic loader and an optical rangefinder.

== Development ==
=== The twenty tonne tank ===
By 1935 the French Infantry had not yet developed a satisfactory medium tank. Whereas a reasonably effective heavy breakthrough tank was available, the Char B1, and several light infantry support tanks were on the brink of being taken into production – the Renault R35, Hotchkiss H35 and the FCM 36 – a good medium tank had still to be designed, as the Char D1 was a manifest failure and the Char D2 only a slight improvement over its ancestor. Such a medium tank was needed in a minimal number of 250 to serve in the planned organic tank battalion of the five Mechanised Infantry Divisions, the main Infantry force capable of executing strategic offensive or defensive movements. A good medium tank was already under development by the French Cavalry, the SOMUA S35, but the Infantry rejected this type, both because of technological reasons – its climbing capacity was limited – and because the Infantry wanted to assert its dominance over the Cavalry in the field of tank design.

On 18 December 1935 the first specifications were issued by the Infantry for a Char Moyen d'Infanterie de 20 tonnes ("twenty tonne medium infantry tank"). They called for a tank with a road speed of 50 km/h, an off-road speed of 20 km/h, a range of 400 kilometres, a trench crossing capacity of two metres, a wading capacity of 120 centimetres, a climbing capacity of eighty centimetres and 45° slope, a 47 mm gun and 7.5 mm machine-gun, an armour thickness of 40 mm, a gas-proof hull and the possession of a radio set. The weight limit of twenty metric tonnes was chosen because of railroad, bridge carrying and pontoon constraints. Overall these features were close to those of the SOMUA S35.

=== New specifications ===
In May 1936, the Conseil Consultatif de l'Armement accordingly decided that French industry would be invited to initiate studies on the design of a tank having sufficient protection and armament to fight other armour, but light enough (twenty tons or less) to be both cheap and mobile. However, during this period, it began to be increasingly realised that the Char B1 was overly complex and expensive and two tonnes heavier than necessary because of using riveted armour plate instead of cast or welded armour. A twenty-tonne tank would be lighter, swifter, cheaper, more easily produced and require less training. It was therefore also decided that the new twenty-tonne tank should be able to serve as a future battle tank, eventually replacing the older heavy tank.

In October, a special commission revealed to the French industry the changed specifications for the "twenty tonne tank": a maximum speed of at least 40 km/h; a range of 200 km; a protection level equal to that of the Char B1 bis (i.e. 60 mm all around); a trench crossing capacity of 250 cm; a complete protection against gas attack; the dimensions should not impede rail transport and the armament should consist of a high-velocity gun capable of destroying all expected enemy medium tanks, combined with two machine guns.

The specifications implied that the vehicle would have been the most potent and modern French tank yet developed. It also entailed that its introduction would not take place in the near future, as it was simply too advanced. This way it was avoided that a decision would have to be reached about the future course the Infantry tank weapon should take. At the time, there were officers, like Charles de Gaulle, who proposed that the Infantry raise armoured divisions that were similar in organisation to the Divisions Légères Mécaniques of the French Cavalry or the German Panzerdivisionen, i.e. balanced forces with much organic mechanised infantry and motorised artillery, that would be flexible enough to fulfill all possible tactical roles. Other officers however considered it redundant to imitate the cavalry and thought the infantry should stick to its proper task: the break-through only. Some of them wanted that the money to be spent on armoured divisions to instead go to the production of a sufficient number of light infantry tanks to give each division its own organic battalion, as the best way to ensure an effective execution of combined arms tactics. Some wanted only heavy tanks to be built. The Char G, mobile, but heavily armoured enough to function as a break-through tank, only made sense if German-style armoured divisions would be created and a definite decision about its production could only be made when the role-of-the-Infantry debate had produced a clear winner.

Despite this uncertainty about its future, the project generated enormous interest among French industrialists, as it had a real potential to become France's main AFV building programme, leading to large state investments that the industry badly needed during the period of the Great Depression. In late 1936 and early 1937, seven companies submitted plans: Baudet-Donon-Roussel; FCM; Fouga; Lorraine de Dietrich; Renault; SEAM and SOMUA. One company, Batignolles, announced a plan, but did not actually submit one.

The commission issued its report on each proposal on 20 February 1937. For two of these, the report forms the main source of information because they would be discontinued within a year: the SOMUA design resembled a cross between the SOMUA S40 and the SAu 40 self-propelled gun; it was basically a SOMUA S35 with better climbing capacity. Of the FCM design no details are known but it seemed to have had the general outline of the FCM 36, though with its dimensions about 20% larger and equipped with a FCM F4 fortification turret.

Of the other proposals, those of Baudet-Donon-Roussel, Fouga and Lorraine de Dietrich were being kept under consideration until further information could be provided about their feasibility. The SEAM and Renault projects were sufficiently advanced to approve the construction of a prototype of each. The last two firms' good contacts with the French military had allowed them to begin design work even before the specifications were officially revealed. In Renault's case, this advantage had turned into a disadvantage when in November the commission had decided that a hull-based 75 mm main armament was to be preferred on instigation of Prince André Poniatowski, head of a design bureau subcontracted by SEAM, whose proposal unsurprisingly had this feature. The SEAM prototype was to be delivered before 31 October 1937 at a price of 1.2 million French francs, twenty percent of which was advanced by the state.

The new demand for a 75 mm gun in the hull posed many problems for most contenders as in their first designs no room had been provided to mount such a large weapon; it would likely add a mass of two tonnes. The requirement for a 50% increase in armour protection caused another two-tonne weight rise. All designs on 20 February 1937 failed to meet the original twenty-tonne weight limit and were projected at 23–25 tonnes.

Renault's tank could easily be adapted, however, to hold a 75 mm gun in the turret. In 1936 Renault proposed this as an alternative, and it was well received. Encouraged by this, in 1937 he retook the initiative from Poniatowski by, through an intermediary, bribing a high-ranking officer of the Direction de l'Infanterie; the latter again manipulated the commission to change the design policy. He convinced the commission that a 75 mm gun in the turret should be not merely an option, but mandatory. This gave Renault an enormous advantage over all his rivals who now were forced to completely redesign their projects, leading to inevitable large and, as Renault hoped, perhaps fatal delays.

In late 1937, the project had been renamed Char G1 and all prototypes then authorised had received an official designation: Lorraine: G1L; Renault: G1R; Baudet Donon Rousel: G1B, Fouga: G1F and SEAM: G1P. The SOMUA and FCM projects were discontinued for being too vague or lacking innovation; also the production capacity of these two companies had already been directed to the manufacture of other types.

On 1 February 1938 the Direction de l'Infanterie issued new specifications, the third major change in the project concept: a maximum weight increased to 35 tonnes, necessitated by the fitting of an L/32 (32 caliber long) 75 mm gun in a turret.

These new demands caused most companies to slow the design process: they were unwilling to invest much money in an ever more complex system with uncertain prospects. Therefore, the French government ordered on 8 June 1938 that ARL military engineer Maurice Lavirotte be detached to guide their efforts, in order to speed the proceedings; if the companies could not obtain armour plate, they should be allowed to use boiler plate to construct prototypes. At that moment Renault was unable to give any indication about a possible production date; the Fouga and BDR projects seemed to become prohibitively heavy; SEAM thought to be able to commence manufacture in the middle of 1940 and Lorraine in 1941.

On 12 July 1938 a much more detailed list of specifications was given. In general they called for a tank that was to be powerfully armed, immune to standard anti-tank guns, and possessing an excellent tactical and strategic mobility. In detail they demanded a long high velocity semi-automatic 75 mm main armament; a 7.5mm machine-gun in the turret that could also serve as an AA-weapon; a machine-gun in the front of the hull or the turret; a minimal ammunition load of a hundred rounds for the gun and thirty magazines for the machine-gun; an empty weight of thirty and a combat weight of thirty-two tonnes. The engine was to be able to be both electrically and manually started, and the tracks were to be fully accessible. An on-road speed capability was required of 40 km/h maximum and 30 km/h average over a long journey, with an off-road capability of 20 km/h. Two fuel tanks were to allow a range of two hundred kilometres or eight hours off-road. The climbing capacity was to be ninety centimetres and 85% on a solid or 65% on a wet slope. The trench-crossing capacity was to be 250 centimetres and the wading capacity, 120 centimetres. For the first time, dimensional limits were included: the width was not to exceed 294 centimetres to facilitate rail transport, and the absolute height of the fighting compartment was not to exceed 120 cm, but yet be sufficient to hold a side-door.

As regards specifications for the gas-tight armour, the required thickness remained at sixty millimetres, but a requirement was added that appliqué armour construction techniques not be used, along with a detail requirement that the armour could be cast – with the sections connected by bolts or, preferably, gudgeons – or electrically welded. A requirement that automatic fire-extinguishers be present also was added.

The crew was to have advanced vision and fire-control equipment. The cupola, armed with the secondary 7.5 mm machine gun, was to have a large episcope to which the main turret was to be slaved, allowing the commander to lay the 75 mm gun on the target himself, allowing for the possibility that the commander would double as gunner. The cupola also was to be fitted with an optical telemetric rangefinder. The main gun was to be an L/32 75 mm gun, providing, despite its limited caliber-length compared to anticipated comparable AFV main weapons of other major military powers, a good muzzle velocity through the use of Brandt tungsten armour-piercing subcalibre ammunition.

None of the projects in the summer of 1938 could meet these specifications without a fundamental redesign.

=== Char G1P ===
The Char G1P, put forth by SEAM (Société d'Études et d'Applications Mécaniques), had received its designation letter P because Poniatowski had designed it. SEAM was the only company whose project was sufficiently advanced – due to it being informed in advance of the first specifications of 1935 – to present an actual prototype to the Commission de Vincennes, early in the night of 3 December 1936, albeit in an unfinished state. Despite having neither the intended engine nor any armament fixed (a bell-shaped dummy turret with large glass windows was placed on the turret ring), the vehicle already weighed 23 metric tonnes, confirming the prediction of a study made by the army workshop, the Atelier de Rueil (ARL), that it would be impossible for a tank to meet the required specifications within even a 28 tonne limit. Instead of the intended 12 CV 280 hp engine a Hispano 6 CV engine of 120 hp had been utilised. Although a petro-electric transmission system was used, theoretically leading to a higher effective power output, tests performed between 3 and 10 December showed that the maximum speed was, as could be expected from the weak provisional engine, a disappointing fourteen km/h on the road, and ten km/h in terrain. The transmission alone weighed 2.4 tonnes, 1.5 tonnes heavier than a traditional mechanical system. Steering was easy though, and unlike most other petro-electrical systems it performed without reliability problems. The vehicle made extensive use of smoothly curved cast sloped armour. There was room in the right side of the hull for a 75 mm main gun. There was to be a crew of four: a commander (also manning a machine gun turret), a driver, a gunner and a radio-operator. The length was 557 cm.

The commission decided that, given the unfinished state of the project, no definitive decisions could be made. SEAM was invited to improve the prototype by lengthening the hull, fitting a more supple suspension, and moving the fire-proof bulkhead 95 mm to the back to enlarge the fighting compartment, creating more room to operate the 75 mm gun.

On 6 June 1937, the project was considered by the Conseil Supérieur de la Guerre as a possible battle tank to equip the future Divisions Cuirassées, the armoured divisions of the Infantry. During 1937 and 1938, the company rebuilt the vehicle, changing the suspension and cooperating with ARL to install a 280 hp Hispano-Suiza engine. Pictures show this rebuilt design had six large road wheels per side. Besides the hull armament, the placement of an APX4 turret, armed with a 47 mm SA 35 gun, was ordered by the commission on 24 May 1938, together with the placement of a radio set. The dimensions of the prototype were also slightly changed: the width decreased from 2.94 m to 2.92 m and the height from 2,76 to 2.73. The larger turret was partly compensated by decreasing hull height from 183 to 174 cm.

In early 1939, the commission still was considering whether to order about 250 vehicles. During this time SEAM experienced severe financial difficulties, however. When in July 1938 new specifications called for a main 75 mm armament in the turret, the company was unable to finance a completely redesigned vehicle; the existing prototype could not easily be adapted and its transmission had already shown to be overloaded by earlier weight increases. The company appealed to the ARL workshop to assist, and the Conseil Consultatif de l'Armement ordered on 19 January that ARL should comply, and SEAM transferred the prototype ARL for installation of an ARL 3 turret on a widened superstructure. When war broke out on 10 September 1939, this development was suspended. On 22 December 1939 it was restarted but merely as a technology demonstrator; at the time of the Fall of France the vehicle was still unfinished and without turret, though it was the only offshoot of the Char G1 project to near completion or even to be in a running condition.

=== Char G1F ===
In late 1937, Fouga had not yet submitted a definite proposal. Its initial project, no drawings of which have survived, proposed a system in which the hull gun was traversed by slewing the entire vehicle, just as with the Char B1, but instead of the expensive Naeder transmission as used in the B1 a British Wilson gear box was planned. Another difference from competing designs was that the track return run was low. The commission rejected the use of a Carden-Loyd track, judging it to be too weak. Nevertheless, Fouga obtained an order for the production of a prototype. In 1938 it was estimated that the weight would rise to 35 tonnes if a 75 mm turret was added. During 1939 the development was terminated, perhaps somewhat earlier than the other projects.

=== Char G1B ===
Baudet-Donon-Roussel proposed to build a tank with the general outlines of the Char B1, including a high return track run, but with seven road wheels per side that unlike the B1 did not require a daily greasing, instead using sealed ball-bearings. The track was to have a continuous rubber (Pendelastic) inner lining. The project was to have the following dimensions: a length of 556 cm; a width of 280 cm and a height of 285 cm. It thus was the largest and heaviest of all proposals with a weight of 28.5 tonnes. Track width was to be 35 cm. The normal wading capacity was to be 145 cm; BDR thought it also possible to make the tank fully immersible to cross rivers while being guided from the river bank. It was planned to install an air-cooled Potez 12V 320 hp engine, placed transversely in the hull. The transmission was petro-electrical and of the Gebus-Roussin type. The fuel tank was to have a capacity of 520 litres. The armament was to consist of a 75 mm SA 35 howitzer in the hull with 70 rounds. In the 1937 configuration, the tank was to have an APX4 turret with a 47 mm SA 35 gun with 102 rounds. As the hull was wide enough to place the 75 mm gun in its middle, the turret should have been moved to the left, but this was forgotten in the proposal, as the commission pointed out.

When the commission issued its changed specifications calling for a 75 mm main gun in a turret, the BDR project threatened to become much too heavy as the hull was already so large. The commission in the summer of 1938 urged BDR to remedy this somehow, but the problem proved to be insurmountable. A proposal to install a more powerful 350 hp Renault engine only partly compensated for a drop in mobility due to the weight increase. It transpired on 13 April 1939 that the intended ARL3 turret, bringing the proposed tank's height to 325 cm, could not be fitted without making the design too wide for rail transport, and further that the weight, now projected at 37.5 metric tonnes, would exceed pontoon limits. The BDR project was suspended on 10 September 1939, even though a prototype had been ordered in March 1939 by the Ministry of Defence. A wooden mock-up was all that was finished – and even that could not be shown to the commission because it was for security reasons constructed in an enclosed room lacking a sufficiently large exit; no complete prototype was ever built. However, from the Char G1B project the ARL 40 assault gun project subsequently was developed.

=== Char G1L ===
The project of Lorraine de Dietrich was based on its 1933 design for a light infantry tank. It was low and long with an excellent trench crossing capacity. This however implied there was no room for a 75 mm hull-based gun; its calibre was reduced to 47 mm, which seemed redundant given that it also had a 47 mm gun in an APX4 turret. The track was that of Carden-Loyd and considered too weak by the commission, as with the G1F project. Similarly the initial proposal to fit a Cleveland transmission was seen by the commission as unsuitable, and it was replaced by a Cotal. The planned engine was a Hispano-Suiza of 230 hp. The length was to be 550 cm, and the width was to be 250 cm.

The project differed from most of the others in using several welded steel plate sections in addition to cast armour. In 1937 it became clear that the quality of cast armour was difficult to control and that limited production facilities, combined with the fact that many other French tanks used cast armour sections also, would restrict production. Also the Lorraine tank's electromechanical transmission was less of a development hazard; its suspension was that of the Lorraine 37L tractor and thus already in mass production. At the same time international tensions continued to rise; to have a modern type ready for introduction seemed a matter of simple precaution. As a result, in late 1937 the project was accepted for service and Lorraine was granted a full development contract for 2.6 million francs, with a prototype to be delivered before the end of 1938.

In the summer of 1938 a plain steel mock-up was ready; the company predicted production could start in 1941. However, the specification changes of 1939 disrupted this plan. When the design of the Char G1L was changed to fit a 75 mm gun turret, the projected weight increased to 36 tonnes. Even the first proposal had had an estimated empty hull weight of 16 tonnes. To compensate for the greater weight, a more powerful Panhard engine of 450 hp was planned; however to accommodate this larger, more powerful engine the engine deck had to be raised so high that it would impede a full rotation of the heavier FCM turret. With the engine mounting and turret mounting changes the tank height would be 290 cm. Also the suspension elements threatened to be overloaded; the track ground-pressure was, at six kilogramme per square centimetre, three times the maximum allowed by the specification. In early 1939, Lorraine tried to keep the project viable by creating a turret derived from the ARL 3 type, as not a single ARL 3 turret had yet be constructed, even as a mock-up. This Lorraine turret was somewhat lower, helping with the overall height; however, the new turret's decreased height resulted in a limited depression of the gun. On 13 April 1939, the commission recommended that the G1L project be abandoned, but this was refused by the ministry of defence. On 10 September, after the outbreak of war, it was finally suspended.

=== Char G1R ===
Louis Renault was very interested in the programme as it on the one hand threatened to compete with his own Char D2 – and the Char B1 in the production of which he had a large stake – and on the other hand offered an opportunity to repair his reputation as France's most prominent tank producer, that had been damaged by the failing AMC 34 and AMC 35 projects and complaints about the reliability of his other types.

Renault submitted its initial proposal to the commission on 10 December 1936, soon after the nationalization of the military branch of the company and renaming of that factory to AMX. This did not stop Louis Renault from remaining very active on the field of military design and production though, using the remainder of his company and competing or cooperating with AMX as he saw fit. Quickly a wooden mock-up was finished of the Renault version of the Char G; the project had the factory designation Renault ACK1. The designation merely indicated the chronological order of Renault's military prototypes, and had no further meaning.

Renault's initial proposal was based on the Renault ZM, or Renault R35. It had a similar smooth curved cast hull to that of the light infantry tank but was much wider and had six road wheels and double tracks per side – to avoid having to design a new broad track. It had a modern torsion bar suspension and, like the originally proposed G1L, a (rather outdated) Cleveland transmission. The suspension protection plates formed an integral part with the hull's main armour.

The hull was crowned by a flat-domed cast superstructure that superficially resembled a circular conventional turret. In reality however it was at first planned to be fixed; the 47 mm gun was supposed to traverse through a horizontal slit like in a pill-box, rotating on a pivot fixed to the hull floor, a proposal made by Colonel Balland. In a second version of this design by engineer Jean Restany, the "pseudo-turret" was traversable, but simply carried along by the electrically driven gun-mount; the turret therefore would not have to be equipped with a heavy gun-mantlet and, not bearing the weight of the armament, could be much lighter. On the right side of the superstructure a vertical cylinder protruded, on top of which a small rotating commander's cupola was fitted, that was armed with dual co-axial machine guns. The superstructure, with the commander/gunner on the right and the loader on the left, had sufficient room to hold a Schneider 47 mm antitank gun that was much more powerful than the shorter 47 mm SA 35 gun equipping the standard APX1 and APX4 turrets. Expecting that this superior firepower would give his design a clear advantage leading to a quick production contract, as had so often happened in the past, Renault was unpleasantly surprised when lobbying by Poniatowski contributed to a change in specifications to the effect that a 75 mm gun had to be carried in the hull. The ACK1 hull was simply too flat for this. To save his project Renault started a strong counter-lobby. Part of this was proposing, already on 10 December 1936, that as an alternative option the turret should hold a longer (at least L/29) main 75 mm armament. It was also claimed that the weight of the projects, 24 tonnes, could be reduced to 19.6 tonnes by limiting the armament to a single gun.

The commission in 1937 was hesitant about the torsion-bar suspension, and rejected the Cleveland transmission and double-track feature. It also concluded that weight would be at least 25 tonnes. Nevertheless, an order for a prototype was made, in view of the innovative armament mounting.

The specification change of 1 February 1938 was much in favour of Renault, as the other companies needed a very fundamental redesign of their projects to meet the new demands, whereas the ACK1 with its broad fighting compartment could easily accommodate a wide turret as it was. Renault also promised that his tank could be taken into production in 1940, a year earlier than the Char G1L, so the latter project could be replaced by his Char G1R as the main development type.

At this moment however it was recognized by the commission that the weight estimate earlier made by the bribed Infantry officer had been a deliberate falsehood and that the best that could be expected was 28 tonnes. Also the claimed first production date, that had already led to a limiting of Char B1 bis orders, later was proven to be wildly optimistic. In April 1938 Renault claimed that weight could be saved by retaining the torsion-bar suspension, limiting the crew to four and keeping the ammunition load to its bare minimum. The commission decided however to bring the weight limit of the project to thirty tonnes, as this was in line with the other projects and the planned inner hull side armour (located behind fifty millimetres external suspension protection plates) of ten millimetres was deemed too thin. The weight advantage in relation to the rival designs thus largely disappeared.

In the summer of 1938 a further problem for the Renault design materialised in that a new demand was made that the turret should hold a stabilised gun and a telemetric rangefinder, features to which the cast turret could not be easily adapted. As the 2.5 tonne pseudo-turret was moved about by the gun barrel, its momentum tended to disturb the sight-laying. This problem was solved in 1939 with the help of APX, which designed a system in which the vertical axis of the gun mount was directly connected to the turret roof. At the same time the troublesome Cleveland transmission was abandoned. Overall the Renault design process in the years 1938 and 1939 was very slow.

On 10 September 1939 the Char G1R was the only one of the projects that was to be further developed, probably because the Renault company was exceptional in having reserve production capacity left.

== Turret design ==
In France during the 1930s, tank turrets were generally designed separately from tank hulls, to serve as standard types applicable to many different vehicles. On 1 June 1938 the commission determined that three teams, those of ARL, FCM and Renault, were in the process of developing new turrets capable of being fitted on the Char G1 under the new specifications. These were invited to make the necessary changes and research existing or new sufficiently-high-velocity 75 mm guns.

In July 1939 ARL was developing prototypes of both a turret, the 5.7 tonne ARL 3 fitted with a turret-basket and having a turret ring diameter of 188 cm, and a gun, also in the context of the FCM F1 project. FCM was considering use of a revised 7.5 tonne version of the welded octagonal auxiliary turret of the heavy FCM F1, to be equipped with an advanced semi-automatic loader and having a turret ring diameter of 185 cm. As a fallback plan, FCM also was considering the use of the similarly octagonal and welded F4 turret, developed from that of the Char 2C and equipped with the standard 75 mm field gun.

== Tactical function ==
As of the 1939 specifications, the goal of the Char G1 project was no longer to provide tanks to be employed in organic infantry division battalions. For this Char d'accompagnement role the AMX 38 – with its twenty tonne weight and 47 mm armament indeed very close to the earlier "twenty tonne tank" concept – was now planned. Nor was the Char G1 to replace the Char B1, as the threat of imminent war had dictated that most production capacity was to be used to increase the manufacture of existing types. In fact no official policy regarding the tactical function of some future Char G1 had been formulated. From a strategic point of view the only justified employment was during the third phase of the planned offensive campaign to defeat Germany: after the enemy was contained in 1940 with the help of the existing tank types, and the Westwall would have been either outflanked or broken in 1941 by the superheavy FCM F1, in 1942 or 1943 deep strategic exploitation by the new technologically superior Char G1 would have brought final victory.

== Char Futur ==
When in September 1939 war broke out, all tank design policies were affected. On 15 December the Inspectorate of Tanks decided that war production should be limited to existing types with the exception of three precisely circumscribed classes: the Char d'Accompagnement, a new medium infantry tank; the Char de Bataille, a new heavy tank; and the Char de Fortification, a superheavy tank. A new Commission of Tank Study was created to study these three types; it first met on 28 February 1940. The commission decided that the Char d'Accompagnement would need a 47 mm gun in a turret and the Char de Bataille at least a 90 mm gun in the hull. The Char G1, being in between the two classes, thus would not be produced.

Of course, Louis Renault did his best to overturn this decision. On 1 April 1940 a subcommission received Renault's head engineer Serre, who argued it would be folly to discontinue the Char G1 project as it was so near fruition. The first armour set would be manufactured by Schneider in July 1940, the suspension and gearbox were almost finished, and a new 350 hp engine was being tested. (He didn't mention this had met much resistance from Louis Renault, who thought the existing engine used in the Char B1 was sufficient, if uprated.) The weight would be lower than 35 tonnes, perhaps as low as 32 tonnes. All theoretical studies could be completed in May and the first vehicle in September. This Commission, not as easily swayed as the previous one as the manipulation by Renault had become known, answered that the prototype could of course be finished as ordered, but that production of the type, despite its interesting advanced technological features, was excluded. The armistice of June 1940 ended all development.

However, in 2008 French armour historian Stéphane Ferrard proposed an alternative interpretation, arguing that the fact that the Renault project was singled out for continued development shows that, had the disruptive course of events not prevented it, very likely the Char G1R would have been taken into production anyway, probably with the ARL 3 turret and a 400 hp engine. Further logical improvement steps would then have been the fitting of the three-man ARL 42 turret, followed by the change to an L/40 75 mm gun, resulting for 1942 in a tank type that would have been comparable in armament and mobility to actually built medium tanks of that date, such as the Soviet T-34 and American M4 Sherman, but with more technologically advanced features, like a range finder and gun stabilisation, foreshadowing the postwar AMX 30.
