= SOMUA S35 =

French cavalry tank (1936–1945)

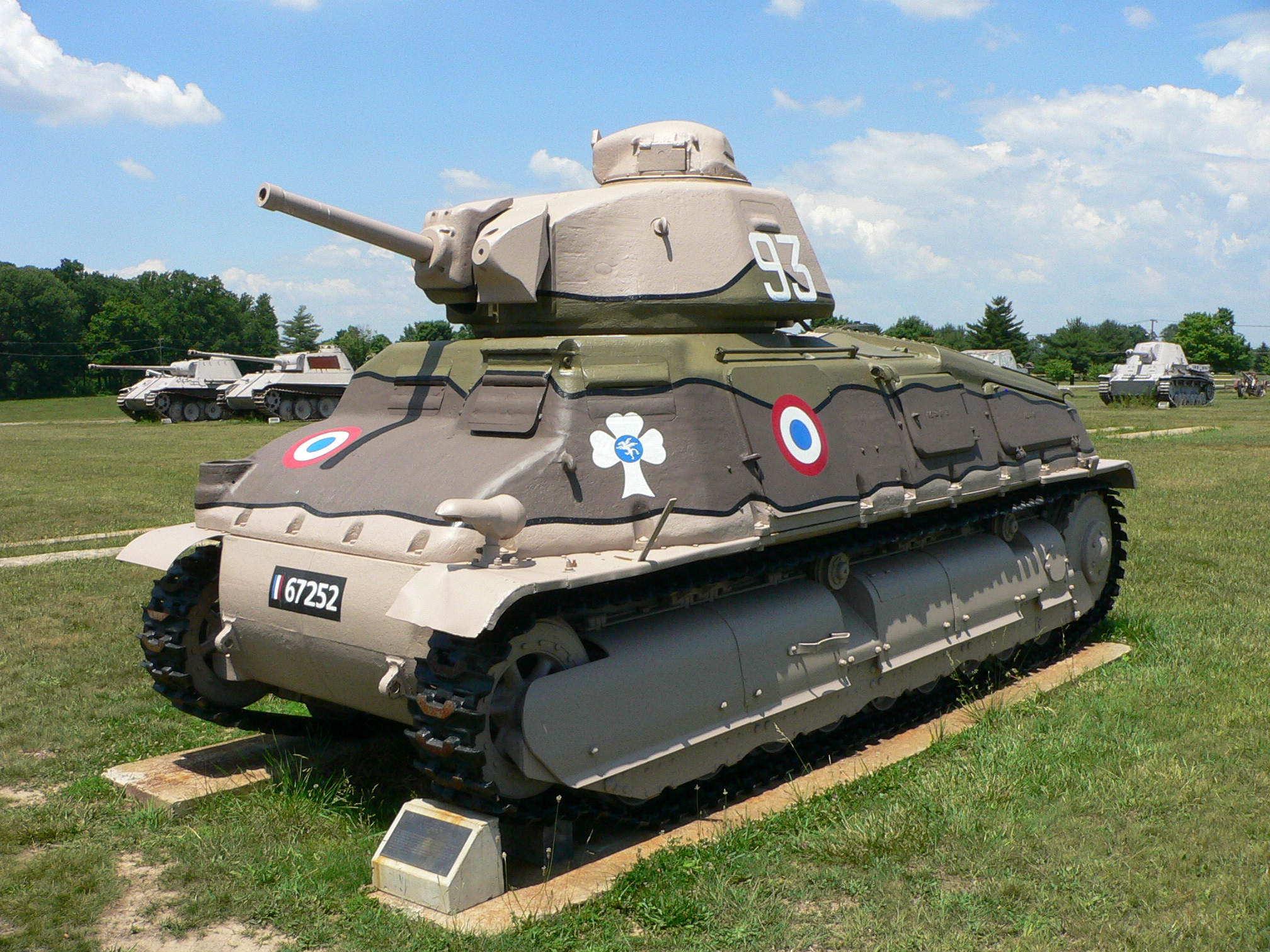
- A SOMUA S35 at the US Army Ordnance Museum
- Type: Cavalry tank
- Place of origin: France

Service history
- In service: 1936–1945
- Used by: France; Germany; Italy; Bulgaria; Hungary
- Wars: World War II

Production history
- Designed: 1934–1935
- Manufacturer: Somua
- Produced: 1935–June 1940
- No. built: ~440
- Variants: S 40

Specifications
- Mass: 19.5 tonnes (19.2 long tons)
- Length: 5.38 m (17 ft 8 in)
- Width: 2.12 m (6 ft 11 in)
- Height: 2.62 m (8 ft 7 in)
- Crew: 3 (driver, radio operator/assistant loader, commander/gunner)
- Armor: 47 mm (hull front); 42 mm (turret front); 40 mm (hull sides and turret sides); 20 mm (top)
- Main armament: 47 mm SA35 L/32 gun
- Secondary armament: 7.5 mm Mitrailleuse mle 1931 optionally coaxial
- Engine: SOMUA V-8 12,666cc petrol engine 190 hp (140 kW)
- Power/weight: 9.7 hp/tonne
- Suspension: leaf spring bogies
- Fuel capacity: 510 L (110 imp gal; 130 US gal)
- Operational range: off-road ~130 km (81 mi), road ~230 km (140 mi)
- Maximum speed: 40 km/h (25 mph) off-road: 32 km/h (20 mph)

The SOMUA S35 was a French cavalry tank of the Second World War. Built from 1936 until 1940 to equip the armoured divisions of the Cavalry, it was for its time a relatively agile medium-weight tank, superior in armour and armament to its French and foreign competitors, such as the contemporary versions of the German Panzer III medium tank. It was constructed from well-sloped, mainly cast, armour sections, that however made it expensive to produce and time-consuming to maintain.

During the German invasion of May 1940, the SOMUA S35 proved itself to be a tactically effective type, but this was negated by the French command's strategic mistakes in deploying their Cavalry armoured divisions. After the defeat of France in June 1940, limiting production to a total of about 440, captured SOMUA S35s were used by the Axis powers, some of them on the Eastern Front. A derived type, the SOMUA S40, with an improved suspension, lowered hull cast and welded turret armour, had been planned to replace the original version on the production lines in July 1940. Agreements to produce this improved type for the benefit of Vichy France, Germany, and Japan, ultimately did not lead to any manufacture.

== Development ==
The design of the SOMUA S35 comes from the changed specifications of 26 June 1934 for an Automitrailleuse de Combat (AMC) issued for cavalry use. These called for a much heavier design than had been originally specified in 1931. The new type had to be immune to contemporary anti-tank guns. By 17 May, the Army had already contacted a subsidiary of Schneider et Cie — the Société d'Outillage Mécanique et d'Usinage d'Artillerie (SOMUA) based at Saint-Ouen — to build a prototype. The company accepted this proposal on 16 July and construction began on 12 October 1934. The prototype, with the name AC3, was ready on 14 April 1935. It was tested from 4 July until 2 August 1935. Then a pre-series of four was produced of an improved type, the AC4, to be tested until 27 January 1938. These first vehicles had the standard APX1 turret, fitted with the short 47 mm SA 34 gun. On 25 March 1936, the AC4 design was accepted as the standard medium tank of the French Cavalry with the official name Automitrailleuse de Combat modèle 1935 S (AMC 1935 S), when a first order for fifty was made. The tank was then more commonly known as SOMUA S35 (S for SOMUA and 35 from 1935, the year of introduction); today the even shorter abbreviation "S35" is most often used, in English sources usually with a hyphen: "S-35".

The mass-production vehicles would have the longer SA 35 gun. Originally, a total production of six hundred was planned to provide each of the three Cavalry armoured divisions with two hundred tanks. Later, budgetary restraints led to a more gradual and limited procurement. In 1936, a second order was made of fifty, followed by a hundred in 1937, and two orders of 125 each in 1938, resulting in total prewar orders of 450 units.

== Description ==
The hull and turret were castings with a maximum thickness of 47 mm and 40 mm respectively — the former of four sections, bolted together: two longitudinal plates formed the bottom; the superstructure was divided in a front and back section. The turret was a variant of the APX 1 as used on the Char B1: the APX 1 CE (chemin élargi) with a larger 1,130 mm (44 in) instead of 1,022 mm (40.2 in) diameter turret ring, allowing the radio operator to assist the commander in loading the gun. The ammunition carried was 118 shells (90 AP, 28 HE) and 2,250 rounds for the machine gun. As with the B1, the commander was expected to direct the tank while also loading, aiming, and firing the 47 mm SA 35 main gun — although at least the radio duty could be left to another crew member. Radios were planned to be part of the standard equipment of S35s. In practice, the platoon commander had an ER (émetteur-récepteur) 29 set for communications with a higher command level, but a shortage of the short range ER28 sets for communication within the platoon meant that the other four tanks of the platoon were never fitted with any form of radio, although in some units all tanks had antennas: the programme to fit the sets themselves was postponed until the summer of 1940 and thus overtaken by events.

The suspension was designed by Eugène Brillié, the same man who had developed the first French tank, the Schneider CA1. He had worked with the Czech Škoda company and based his design on that of the LT35: eight road wheels paired on four bogies with leaf springs and an equally large tension wheel. The first fifty vehicles had tracks consisting of 144 track links, each link with a length of 75 mm; later vehicles had 103 links of 105 mm length.

The engine was in the rear of the hull side by side with two self-sealing fuel tanks, of 100 and 410 litres respectively, separated from the fighting compartment by a firewall bulkhead. The nominally 200 hp engine, designed by Javier-Sabin, drew fuel from the smaller tank, which was itself automatically replenished from the larger one. Inexperienced crews sometimes made the mistake of only filling the smaller tank. Engine and suspension maintenance was difficult and time-consuming, due to a poor accessibility, though this was improved in later vehicles.

The S 35 had an automatic fire extinguishing system using several tanks placed at critical spots, containing methyl bromide.

== Tactical function ==
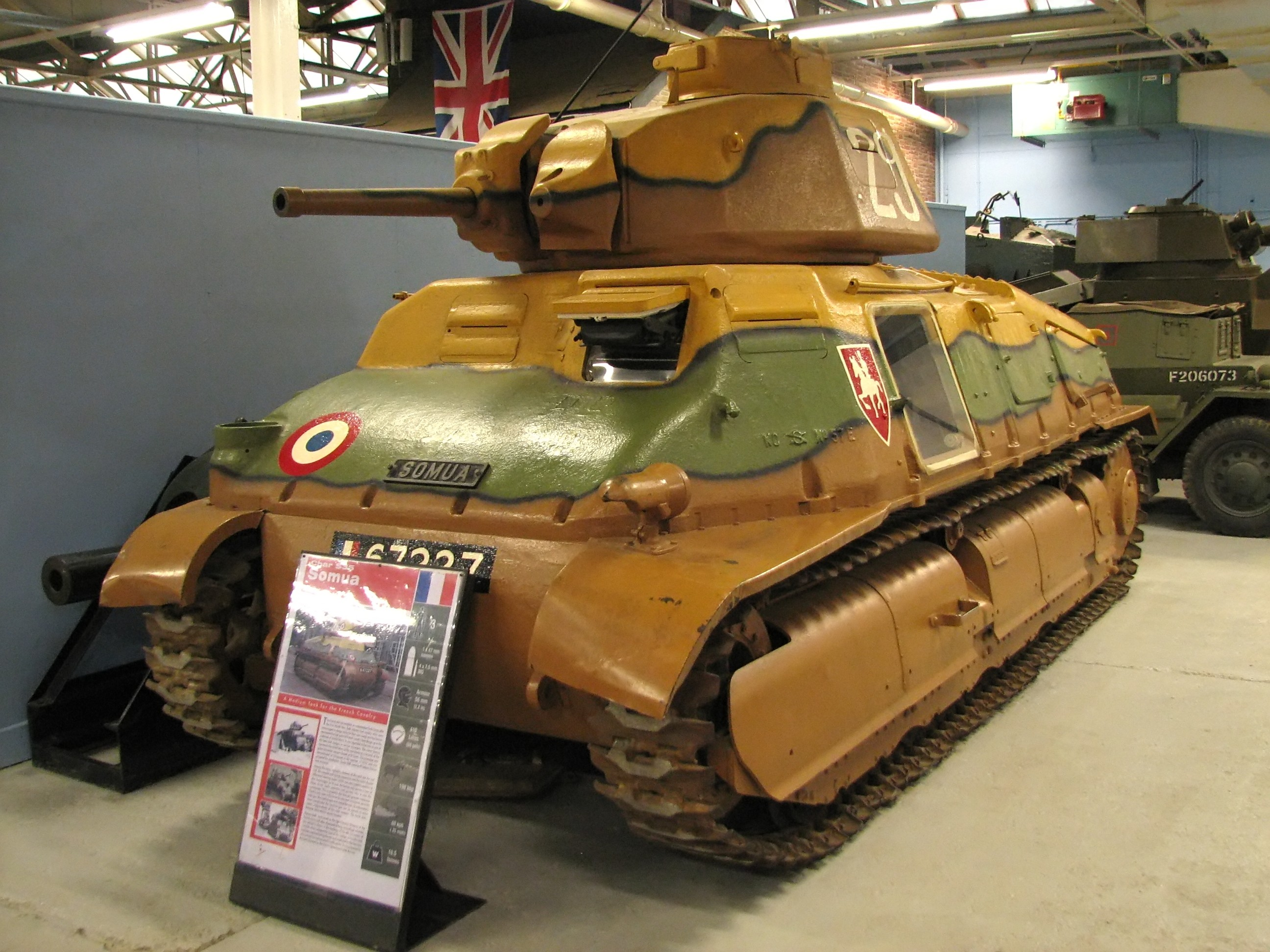
SOMUA S35 at the Bovington Tank Museum

Like the British and the Soviets, the French believed in a strict division of labour between cavalry tanks and infantry tanks; by law, tanks (chars) were limited to the Infantry and the Cavalry had to name its tanks automitrailleuses.

The French Army preferred to fight a defensive battle, and was convinced it would be victorious in such an engagement, but understood that the strategic situation might impose the necessity of waging offensive warfare; during the Second World War for 1941 large offensives against Germany were planned, based on an expected French and British material superiority. Each of the two phases of an offensive – the breakthrough by the Infantry and the exploitation of it by the Cavalry – called for its own specialised vehicle, with the AMC designed to fight enemy armour. The SOMUA S35 was optimised to fulfill the latter role; it had good speed, an adequate range, a gun powerful enough to easily destroy its two probable opponents - the Soviet BT-7 and the German Panzer III - and armour thick enough to be practically immune to the fire of both at normal battle ranges; the armour of any German tank in May 1940 could be penetrated by the S35's 47 mm gun up to a range of 1,000 metres (3,300 ft). So it could carry out deep strategic penetrations and destroy enemy armour reserves trying to prevent them, possessing a good anti-tank capacity. The S35 is sometimes described as the best medium tank of the 1930s.

The French Cavalry, however, judged their main tank to be imperfect in many respects. The one-man turret, though it is today typically mentioned as its single most important drawback, was not seen as a major flaw. A commander was supposed to acquire such a degree of dexterity that his workload did not negate the lack of need to coordinate the actions of three men in a larger turret crew or the advantage of a quicker reaction because of a superior rotation speed. In combat, the tank commander threatened to be overwhelmed with duties, since in addition to his command functions within the tank he was also responsible for aiming and firing the 47mm turret gun and co-axial 7.5mm machine gun. At first, a two-man-turret was required, but when it transpired that this would reduce the armour protection, it was abandoned in favour of thicker steel casts. The CE turret variant mitigated the workload of the commander as it constituted a "one and a half man" turret.

The Cavalry acknowledged three flaws at the tactical, the operational and the strategic levels. The main tactical flaw was the hatchless cupola, forcing the commander to fight buttoned-up. This had been caused by the need to adopt the APX-1 turret, purely for budgetary reasons. The B1 bis's APX4 turret faced similar criticism from the Infantry.

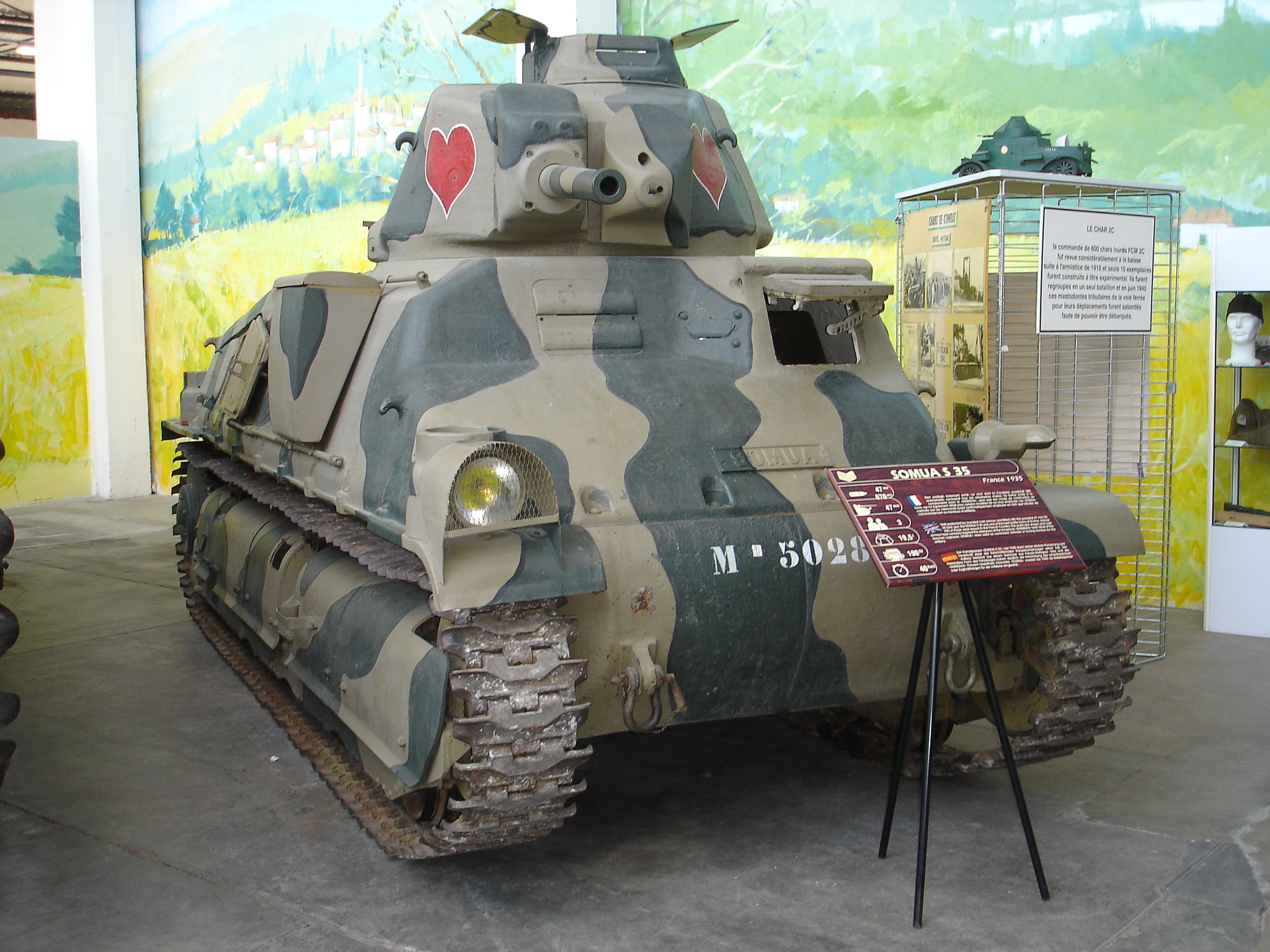
The S35 tank displayed in the museum building at Saumur. The cupola hatch added by the Germans is clearly visible

The operational flaw was its poor mechanical reliability. The suspension units were too weak and too complicated, demanding enormous maintenance efforts, especially since the cast armour modules did not allow an easy access to the suspension and engine. Repairing broken tracks in the field was well-nigh impossible. This had been caused by the fact that there was no central institution regulating French tank development. The Army branches issued very vague specifications, leaving it to private enterprise to come up with precise proposals. The French machine tool national stock was relatively outdated and tank designs reflected the limited existing production facilities. To introduce a Christie suspension — the obvious solution — demanded a thorough industrial modernisation and the raising of quality standards. It was not envisaged until September 1938, when cooperation started with the United Kingdom in order to adopt the cruiser tank suspension for French tank design, and then was limited to the development of a totally new cavalry tank, the AMX 40, without planning to introduce this feature into the S35/S40 production run.

The strategic flaw was the high unit price of the tank, 982,000 French Francs, and the limited number of large cast sections that could be produced. The tank had to be supplemented by a cheaper type and the only one available had been the Hotchkiss H35, much inferior in armour, armament and speed, even after it had been improved to the "H39" variant. The Cavalry had a very low opinion of the fighting value of this light tank. It decided to keep a large number of S35s in the core of their armoured divisions and rejected the easy method of raising more of them by dividing the S35s among the Cavalry Light Divisions — in contrast to the Germans who distributed the also low number of Panzer IIIs partly to their Leichte Kavalleriedivisionen — a key decision changing the Mechanised Light Divisions into true armoured divisions. It also decided against the continued mass production of even lighter vehicles, such as the AMR 35 and AMC 35. This again implied that, in May 1940, the Germans would have a large superiority in strategically mobile large armoured units, of ten to three, because the four French armoured divisions of the Infantry did not possess sufficient organic artillery and infantry to operate effectively in an independent role. France intended to raise many more armoured divisions for use in a decisive offensive in 1941. As the French production capacity for cast armour sections was insufficient, at the time of the defeat negotiations were ongoing to employ American producers, and during the crisis caused by the German attacks in June it was even proposed to let US firms build two thousand vehicles.

== Production and operational history ==
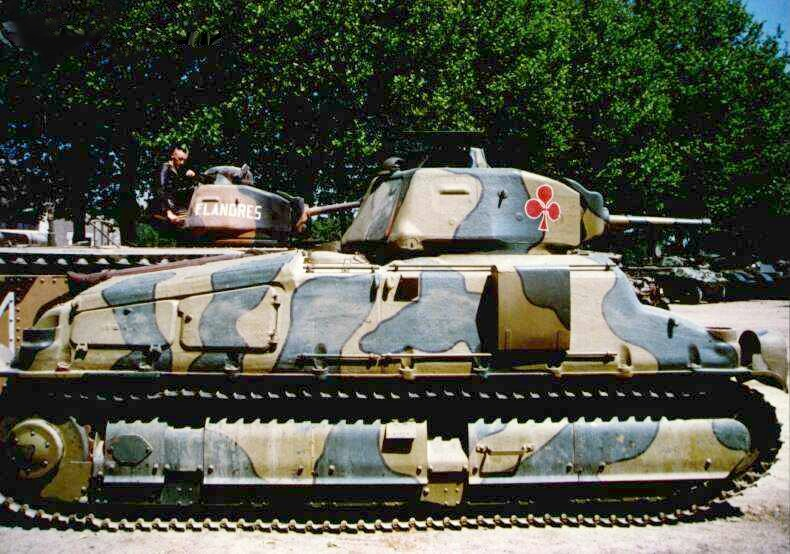
SOMUA S35 in running condition with a Char B1 in the background at the annual Carrousel in Saumur

Four tanks of the AC4 pre-series of the S35 entered service in January 1936 with the 4e Cuirassiers. On 15 April 1937, the first two hulls of the main series left the factory. These, produced at a planned rate of twelve per month, still had to be joined with their turrets. At the end of 1937, the SA 35 gun became available and deliveries of finished tanks of the main production series could begin. On 15 January 1938, four of these were operational. By July 1938, 128 hulls had been delivered, but only 96 tanks were completed with turrets. In the spring of 1939, the number of operational tanks had increased to 192, the two armoured divisions of the Cavalry having attained their nominal strength. By 1 September 1939, the start of the war, 270 had been produced and 246 delivered. At this time, 191 served with the troops, 51 were in the depot and four had been sent back to the factory for overhaul. After the outbreak of war, on 21 September, a sixth order of fifty was made, followed by a final order of 324 bringing the ordered total to 824. Later, it was decided that from the 451st vehicle onwards the tanks would be of the improved S 40 type. Production in fact totalled around 440 by June 1940, including the prototype and the preseries.

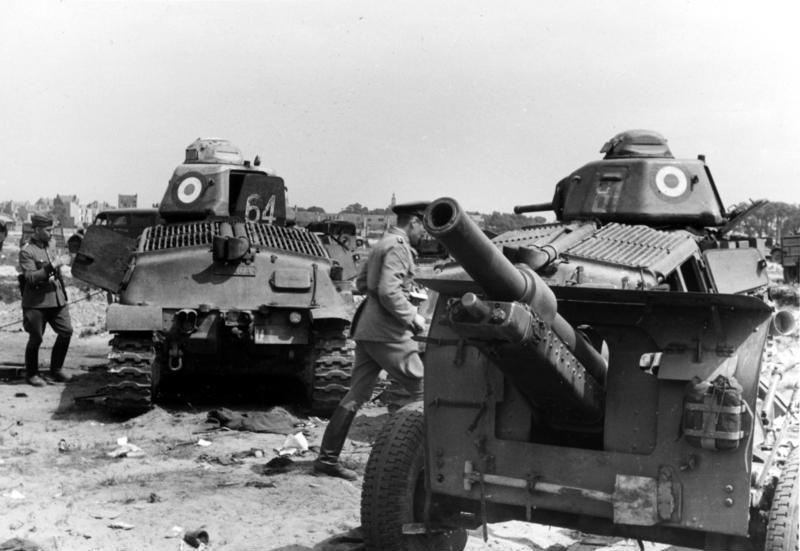
S 35s captured by Germany near Dunkirk in 1940

Of these, about 288 were in front-line service at the beginning of the Battle of France, with the Cavalry's three armoured divisions, the Divisions Légères Mécaniques ("Mechanised Light Divisions" - where "light" meant "mobile" rather than lightly equipped). Each of these had an organic strength of four squadrons with twenty S35s; however, each squadron had a matériel reserve of two tanks, one of them usually used by the squadron commander, resulting in a total of 88 vehicles per division; regimental and brigade commanders in practice had personal tanks too. Furthermore, 31 were present in the general matériel reserve, 49 in factory stocks and 26 were being processed for acceptance. These vehicles were later issued to several ad hoc units, such as the 4th DCR (commanded by Charles de Gaulle) which received 39, part of 3e Cuirassiers, the 4th DLM (10), and some Corps-francs Motorisés (about 25). Also, the destroyed 1st, 2nd and 3rd DLMs were reconstituted with a small number of tanks; the first two divisions received ten S 35s, the third, twenty. S 35s further served with the 7e Cuirassiers (25) and a platoon of three was present in the 3e RAM of the 3e DLC. In May 1940, during the Battle of France, the DLMs were tasked with the difficult manoeuvre of carrying out a quick advance into the Low Countries, followed by a holding action to allow the infantry divisions following behind to dig themselves in. The 2nd and 3rd DLMs were concentrated in the Gembloux gap between Louvain and Namur, where there were no natural obstacles to impede a German advance. They had to spread out somewhat to hold that sector against incursions by the German 3rd and 4th Panzer Divisions. This was necessitated by the local tactical situation and did not reflect some fundamental difference in doctrine between the use of the DLMs and the Panzerdivisionen. Both types of formation were very similar in equipment, training and organisation, as the German armoured divisions too were primarily intended for strategic exploitation, while the breakthrough phase was preferably left to the infantry. The resulting tank battle from 13 to 15 May, the Battle of Hannut, was—with about 1700 AFVs participating—the largest until that day and is still one of the largest of all time. The S 35s gave a good account of themselves, proving to be indeed superior to the German tanks in direct combat, but they were rather hesitantly deployed as the French High Command mistakenly supposed the gap was the German Schwerpunkt and tried to preserve their best tanks to block subsequent attacks by the rest of the Panzerwaffe.

When it transpired the attack was really a feint, and the forces in the north were in danger of being cut off by the German advance south of Namur, the 1st DLM that had very quickly moved two hundred kilometres to the north to help the Dutch, was hurriedly rushed south again. The resulting disorder and breakdown of most of its S 35s rendered this unit, the most powerful of all Allied divisions, impotent; it was defeated by the German 5th Panzerdivision on 17 May. The other DLMs fought a delaying battle, participated in the Battle of Arras and then disintegrated. Committing its only strategically mobile armour reserve early in the battle had made the French Army fatally vulnerable to a German strategic surprise.

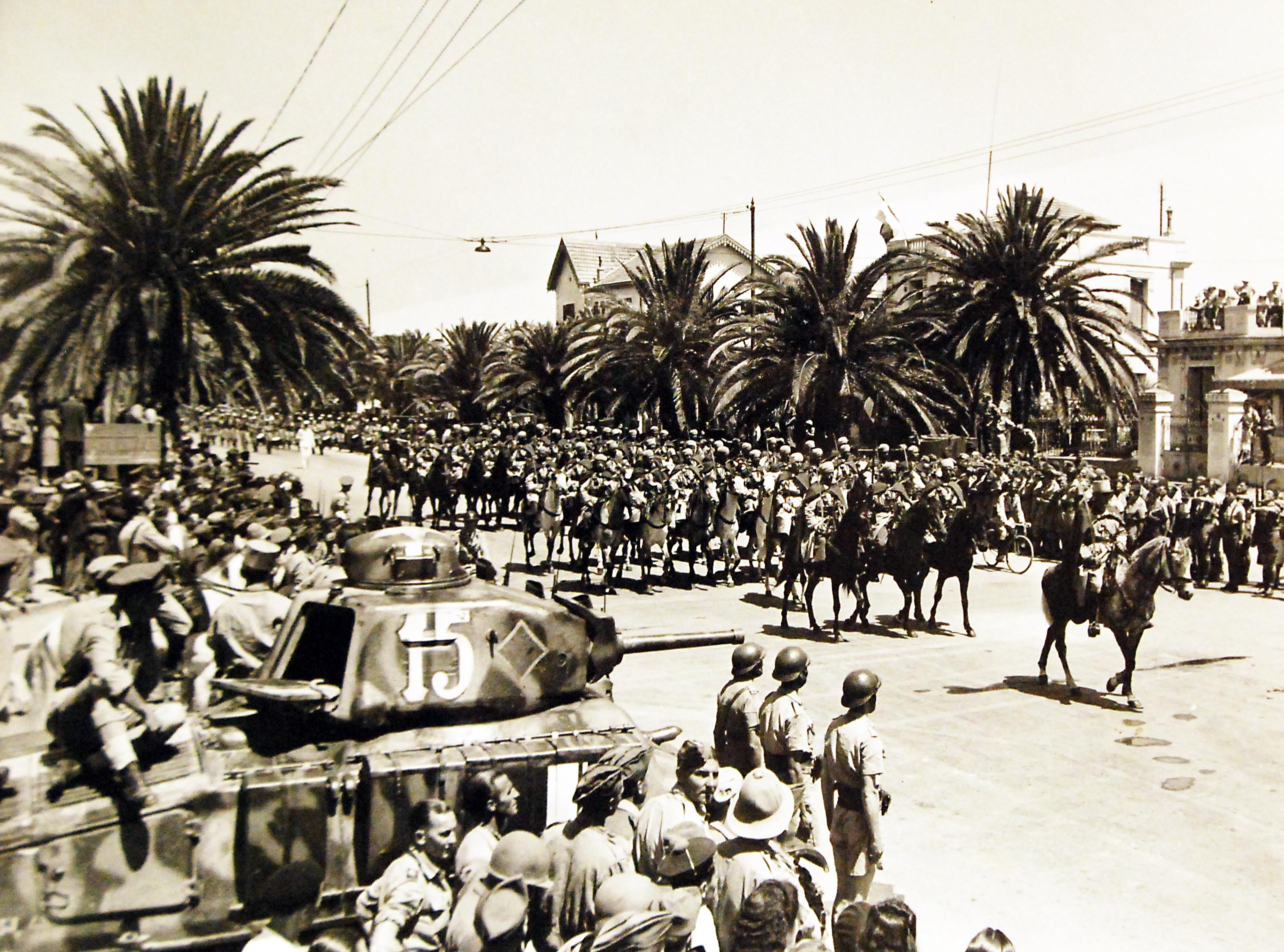
French spahis passing by a S 35 of the 12e RCA, Tunis, 20 May 1943

After the June 1940 armistice, twenty-three S 35s were allowed to be sent to West Africa to bolster the hold of the Vichy regime on that region. They were issued to the 12e régiment de Chasseurs d'Afrique that, after French forces in Africa had sided with the Allies, operated them against German and Italian forces during the Tunisia Campaign. After taking part in the Tunis victory parade, 12e RCA's S35s were replaced by M4 Shermans, but crews often affixed the SOMUA plate on their new tanks.

After the liberation of France, in 1944, an armoured unit was raised, the 13e Régiment de Dragons, using French matériel, among which were seventeen S 35s. French soldiers used SOMUA tanks in the attack on the German-held Oléron Island on the west coast of France in April 1945.

=== Foreign service ===
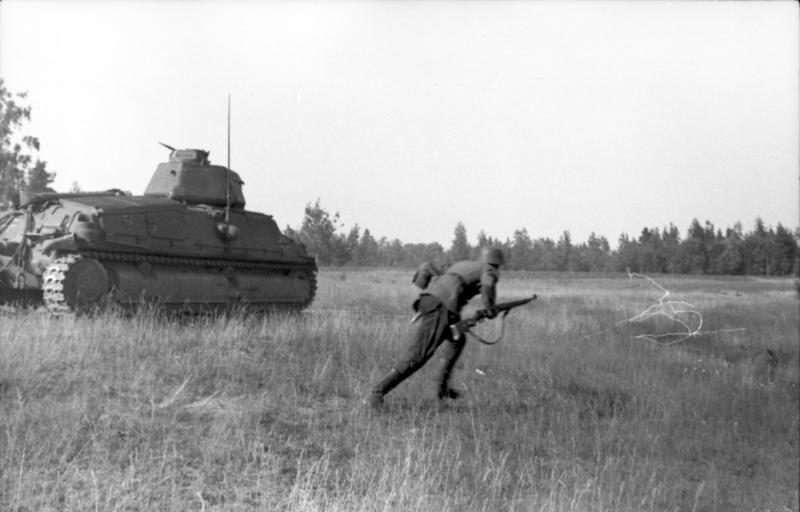
The S 35 in German service on the Eastern Front in 1941

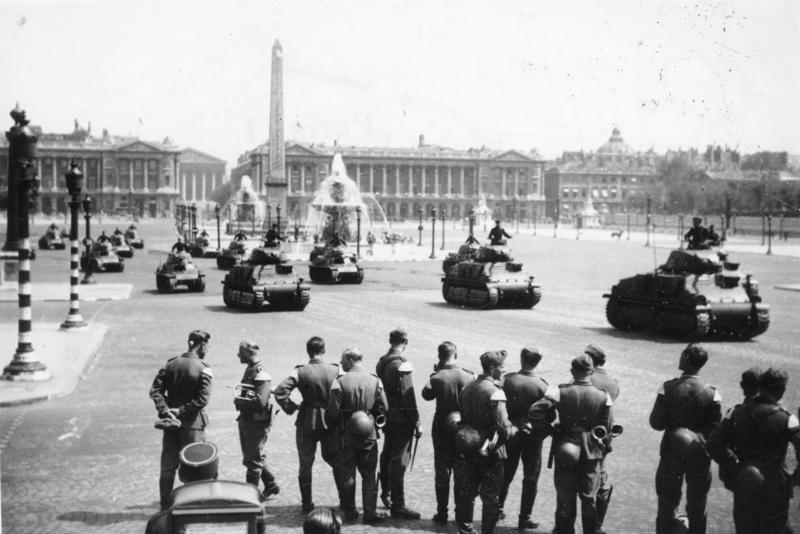
German tank parade in the Place de la Concorde led by SOMUA S 35 tanks, Paris, July 1941.

After the fall of France, a number of S 35s (297 were captured according to some sources) were taken into service with the Wehrmacht as the Panzerkampfwagen 35-S 739(f). The Germans modified the cupola by cutting its top off and installing a simple hatch. On 10 December 1940, the first German tank unit equipped with French Beutepanzer was formed: 201. Panzerregiment with 118 tanks; 36 of these were S 35s, the rest "38Hs". On 10 February 1941, 202. Panzerregiment was established; both regiments were united into Panzerbrigade 100. On 27 January, the independent 301. Panzerabteilung was formed with French vehicles; total S 35 organic strength in the Wehrmacht was thus ninety. On 22 March, this independent battalion replaced the Second Battalion of 201. Panzerregiment, which battalion was renamed Panzer-Abteilung 211 and sent to Finland in June, the only major German unit with S 35s that would fight on the Eastern Front; some were deployed by 22. Panzerdivision near Sevastopol in 1942. The 21st and 25. Panzerdivision in 1943 used some S 35s when reforming after having been largely destroyed. Some vehicles had their superstructure removed and were used for driver-training, while others were used for security duties. Some of these units fought in Normandy in 1944, such as 100. Panzer Ersatz und Ausbildungs-Abteilung and 206. Panzer-Abteilung, while others were used in Yugoslavia for anti-partisan duties (7. SS-Freiwilligen-Gebirgs-Division "Prinz Eugen", 12. Panzer-Kompanie z.b.V. and I./Panzer-Regiment 202). There were still twelve S 35s listed as in German service on 30 December 1944.

Some of the captured S 35s were delivered to German allies: 32 to Italy in 1941, two to Hungary in 1942 and six to Bulgaria in 1943. They were used by the Italians to equip the CC Tank Battalion S35 of the 131st Tank Infantry Regiment, which was transferred in December 1941 to the XIII Army Corps in Sardinia. The Bulgarian vehicles were used after the war by police units. A vehicle captured by the partisans of Tito was refitted by them with a British 6-pounder gun, and designated SO-57.

== Projects ==
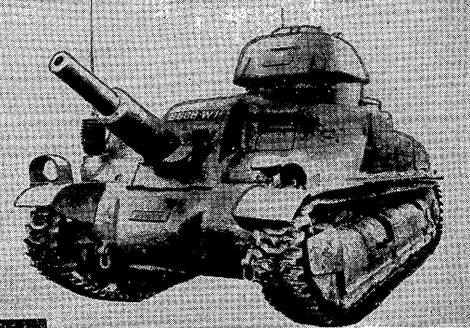
The SOMUA SAu 40 prototype with a 75 mm gun.

In 1937, SOMUA developed the SAu 40 self-propelled 75 mm gun from the S35. Its suspension featured an extra wheel to improve off-road capabilities, and the hull was wider. Only one prototype was built in this configuration; it fought in June, fitted with its 75 mm. 72 units had been ordered on 1 May 1940. The new order requested that the Sau 40 be produced as a self-propelled tank destroyer, with the powerful 47 mm SA 37 gun.

In order to address some of the shortcomings of the S35, SOMUA presented the improved AC5 type in 1939. Based on the SAu 40 chassis and its Char G1-project but with the original width, this SOMUA S40 had a welded ARL 2C turret and redesigned cast superstructure, both to lower production costs and to improve protection standards as the cast sections, delivered by eighteen subcontractors, sometimes were of inferior quality. The new suspension strongly improved the climbing capacity, of which the Cavalry had officially complained in November 1938; its greater weight was compensated by lowering the hull height by fourteen centimetres, causing a weight gain of four hundred kilogrammes. In contrast, the engine deck was raised to fit an improved 230 hp engine, increasing maximum speed to 45 km/h, although the new engine was not yet available in the summer of 1940. The armament and general nominal armour base would remain the same, but first steps to improve these, which might have naturally have evolved into a "S 41", had already been taken in the spring of 1940, when plans were made for a 60 mm welded ARL turret. A first order was on 21 September 1939 made for fifty vehicles, and it was intended to become the main production type, superseding the S 35 from the 451st vehicle with total orders having reached four hundred hulls, but none were completed at the time of the German invasion; the first vehicles were planned to be produced in July; hull sections had already been cast since November 1939. Of the first 160 vehicles, eighty had been planned to be made of an intermediate type, with the old turret.

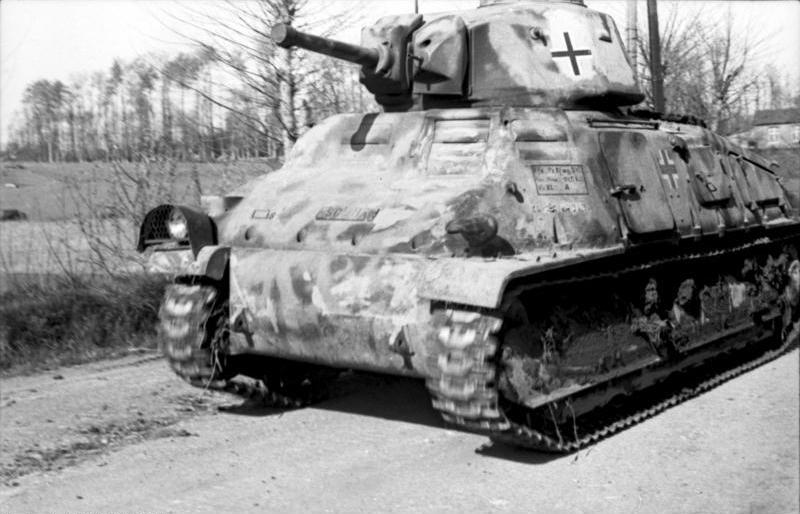
A captured S 35 in service with the Wehrmacht.

After the armistice, plans were developed to resume production, partly for the benefit of the Axis powers. On 28 May 1941, the German ambassador in France Otto Abetz concluded an agreement with the French government, the Protocols of Paris. These included the intention to produce eight hundred SOMUA S40s, two hundred for France itself and six hundred for Germany and Italy. However, Hitler, suspicious of a French rearmament, declined ratifying the agreement.

In November 1940, the Japanese government had requested Germany to allow production for Japan. When Japan became a belligerent through the Attack on Pearl Harbor, it was decided on 9 February 1942 that France would produce 250 SOMUA S40s for the Japanese Imperial Army, the first to be delivered in twelve months time, production having to reach a peak of eight vehicles per month in eighteen months. Both production and delivery were precluded by the Axis occupation of Vichy France in November 1942.

In early 1942, France was finally given permission to reequip its forces with SOMUA S40s, now that the type had become obsolete and the Germans had lost interest. Two versions were considered on 24 April 1942, both fitted with the larger FCM-turret, originally developed for the Char G1. The first would have been armed with the SA 35 gun, operated by a two-man turret crew, the second with the longer SA 37 gun placed in a three-man turret. France foresaw a production of 135 vehicles, to equip three squadrons of 45 each, but the preparations were halted in November 1942 when the whole of France was occupied. However, a clandestine development continued, of a SARL 42, fitted with the ARL 3 turret and a 75 mm L/32 or L/44 gun using an optical range finder. To limit weight, its side armour was to be reduced to thirty millimetres.

In 1945, it was proposed to build a tank destroyer by refitting existing S 35 chassis with a superstructure for the British 76.2 mm 17-pounder gun.

== See also ==
- Tanks in France

== Sources ==
- Pierre Touzin, Les véhicules blindés français, 1900-1944, EPA, 1979
- Pascal Danjou, 2004, L'Automitrailleuse de Combat SOMUA S 35, Éditions du Barbotin, Ballainvilliers, ISBN 2-9520988-0-8
