= Somua S40 =

French tank prototype

SOMUA S40
- SOMUA S35, SOMUA S40, SAu 40
- Place of origin: France

Specifications
- Engine: 220 hp (160 kW)
- Maximum speed: On road: 45 km/h

The SOMUA S40 was a prototype French tank developed before the Second World War. It was based on the SOMUA S35. Compared with the latter, the S40 had a new 220 hp (160 kW) diesel engine; its hull was longer than the S35; and an extra pair of wheels was added on the suspension. The S40 also had a new turret, the ARL 2C.

Mass production was planned for the S40. However, production was cancelled after the Fall of France in 1940.
