= Vercors Massif =

Mountain range in southeastern France

Vercors
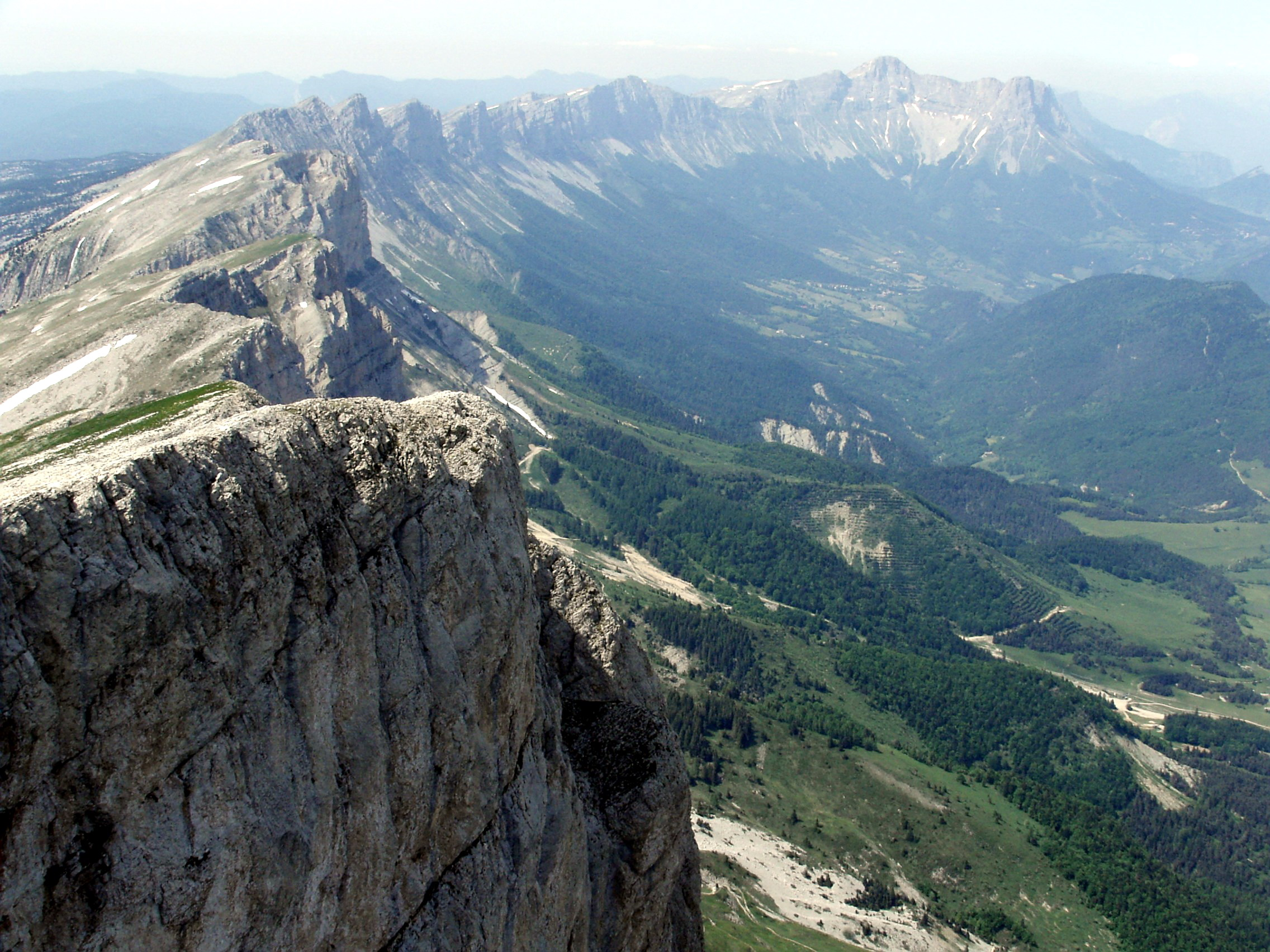
- The view to the north of Le Grand Veymont

Highest point
- Peak: Grand Veymont
- Elevation: 2,341 m (7,680 ft)
- Listing: Prominent mountains of the Alps
- Coordinates: 44°52′12″N 5°31′37″E

Dimensions
- Length: 60 km (37 mi) North
- Width: 40 km (25 mi) West
- Area: 1,350 km^{2} (520 mi^{2})

Geography
- Location within France
- Country: France
- Region: Rhône-Alpes
- Range coordinates: 44°58′N 5°25′E
- Parent range: Alps
- Borders on: Chartreuse Mountains

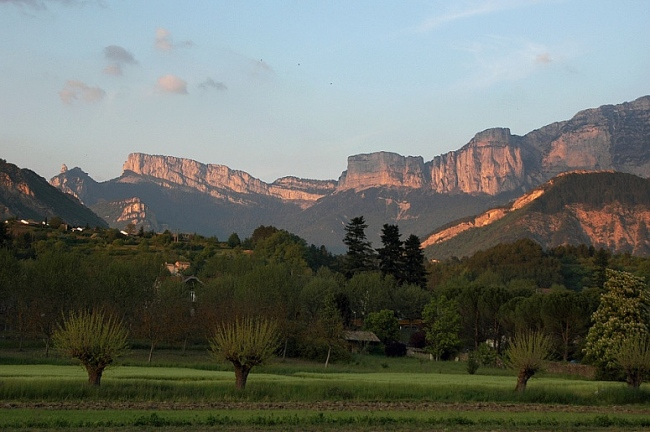
Vercors, Glandasse

The Vercors Massif (French pronunciation: [vɛʁkɔʁ]; Occitan: Vercòrs) is a mountain range in eastern France consisting of rugged plateaus and mountains straddling the départements of Isère and Drôme in the French Prealps. It lies west of the Dauphiné Alps, from which it is separated by the rivers Drac and Isère. The cliffs at the massif's eastern limit face the city of Grenoble.

== Background ==
Over time, various features of the complex geography have been recognised including, the Quatre Montagnes (four mountains), the Coulmes (gorges), the Vercors Drômois (Drome Vercors), the Hauts-Plateaux (high plateaus) and, in the foothills, Royans, Gervanne, Diois, and Trièves.

The massif is sometimes called the "fortress". The movement of people tends to be between the massif and the surrounding plains rather than between the various parts of the massif itself.

Until the mid twentieth century, the name Vercors was used to describe only the township of La Chapelle-en-Vercors (with Royans), and the northern area around Lans-en-Vercors, Villard-de-Lans, Autrans, and Méaudre (with Grenoble) and was known as the Four Mountains area.

In June and July 1944, the massif became important in World War II with the establishment of the Free Republic of Vercors, led by the Maquis du Vercors, a base for the French Resistance against German occupation. A major German offensive extinguished the new Republic in the Battle of Vercors that followed. The battle included the last glider-borne operation of the war.

The Vercors includes the largest alpine karst area in the Northern French pre-alps, and contains a number of large and deep cave systems. These include Gouffre Berger, which is over 1,100 metres (3,600 ft) deep, and the Réseau de Coufin-Chevaline (grotte de Choranche), a show cave in the Bourne Gorge which has almost 30 kilometres (19 miles) of mapped passages.

The Vercors has several resorts for cross-country skiing and for down-hill skiing. Villard-de-Lans is the biggest down-hill ski resort.

This sporting area is environmentally protected, and although the natural environment has been drastically altered throughout history for the purposes of agriculture and forestry, plans for afforestation will make it one of the major forests of Metropolitan France and a reserve for species such as the southern tulip and black grouse, two symbols of the park, as well as the re-introduced griffon vulture and the alpine ibex. The differences in climate and altitude across the Vercors are reflected in the high level of diversity in the fauna and flora.

Members of the cult the Order of the Solar Temple infamously committed mass murder-suicide in the Vercors in 1995.

== Etymology ==
The name Massif du Vercors is derived from the name of a local tribe who lived in the area at the time of the Roman conquest of Gaul, who were known as the Vertamocorii (also spelled Vertamocori, Vertacomicorii, or Vertacomocorii), meaning excellent troops or troops of the summit. Modern inhabitants are referred to as Vertacomiriens.

Prior to the 1900s, the name Vercors referred only to the upper valleys of the Vernaison near the township of La Chapelle-en-Vercors. At the beginning of the 20th century, Henri Ferrand explored the massif, taking numerous photographs, publishing books, and describing the geology of the mountains. Ferrand was the first to use the term Vercors in its extended contemporary sense. The geographers Raoul Blanchard and Jules Blache, popularised the term in the late 1920s and early 1930s. By the 1950s, the term was ubiquitous.

== Geography ==
=== Location ===
The Vercors Massif lies in the Prealps, in the south-east France, straddling the departments of Drôme and Isère, both of which are part of the Rhône-Alpes region, about 100 kilometres (62 miles) south-east of Lyon. The massif covers 135,000 hectares (520 sq mi) with a north–south length of 60 kilometres (37 miles) and an east–west width of 40 kilometres (25 mi).

The massif is surrounded by the Chartreuse Mountains to the north, the Matheysine area of the Dauphiné Alps to the east, and the Diois Massif to the south. In the far south-east, the massif joins with the 1,457 metres (4,780 ft) col de Menée.

The massif is drained in the north-east and the north-west by the Isère, in the east by the Drac, and in the south by the Drôme. The western side overlooks the Rhône Valley.

=== Topography ===
==== Geomorphology ====
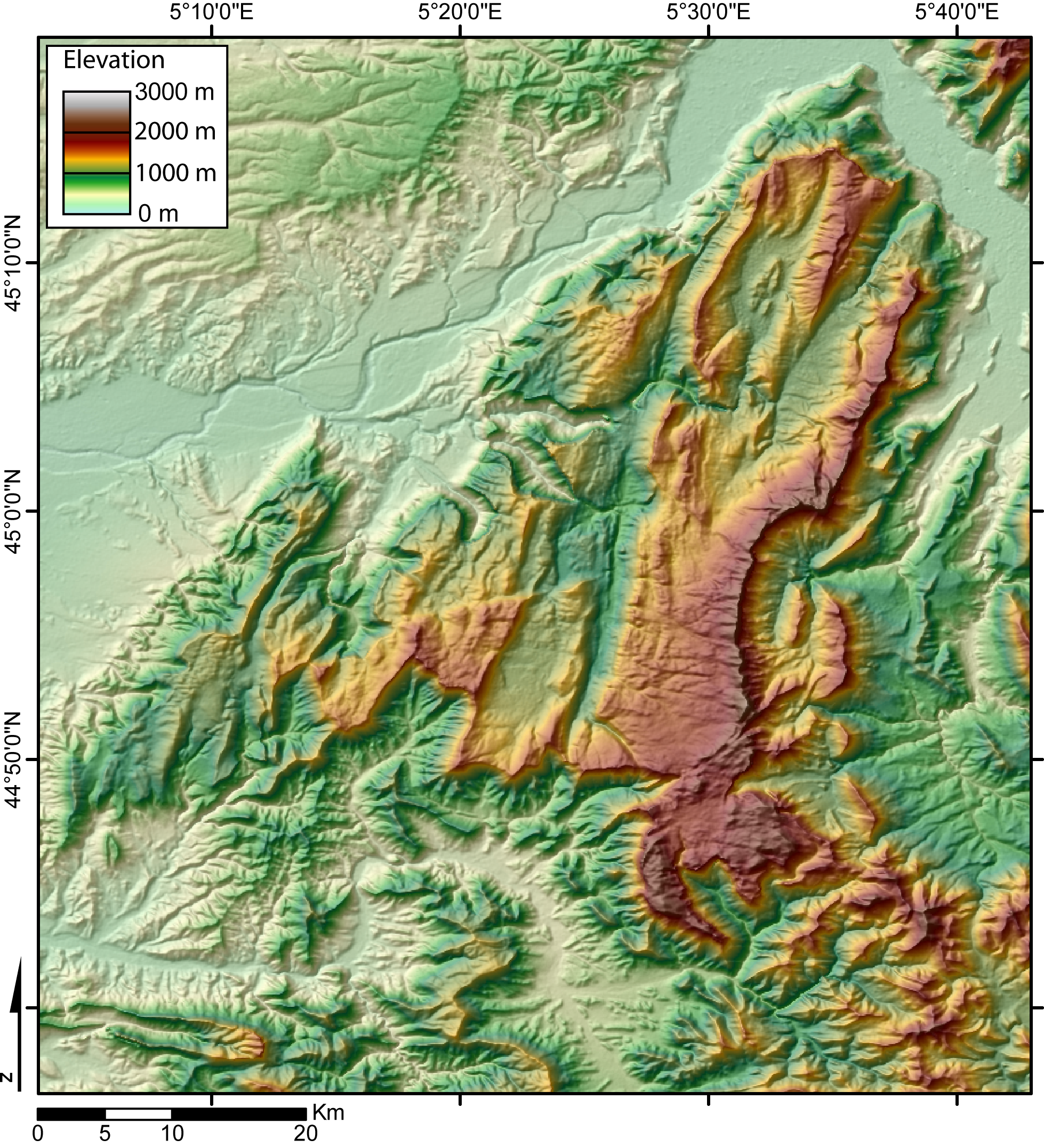
Digital elevation model of the Vercors Massif

The Vercors Massif is known as the fortress or as the French dolomites because of its geomorphology. The massif is likened to a plateau: the fall from the massif to its inner valleys is a few hundred metres, while the fall to the surrounding areas is between 800 metres (2,600 ft) and 1,200 metres (3,900 ft).

The crest of the eastern edge has several summits over 2,000 metres (6,600 ft). The interior varies between 800 metres (2,600 ft) and 1,500 metres (4,900 ft). The massif also has wide valleys including the valley of Lans-en-Vercors, the regions around Autrans, and La Chapelle-en-Vercors, and plateaus including forêt des Coulmes, forêt de Lente, and the high plateau. There are a number of deeply incised gorges, including the Bourne and Furon Gorges. These have imposing cliffs often exceeding 400 metres (1,300 ft) such as the Combe Laval and the Cirque d'Archiane.

Mont Aiguille stands apart from the rest of the massif as the result of erosion. Other parts are isolated from the rest of the massif due to its relief. For example, to reach Gresse-en-Vercors in the south, one must travel 100 kilometres (62 mi) via the col de Rousset or journey 70 kilometres (43 mi) via Saint-Nizier-du-Moucherotte in the north. The villages at the far northern end were isolated by a landslide near the Mortier tunnel. Another example is the Peuil plateau in the east. During the Ice Age, the Grésivaudan glacier reached the Peuil plateau leaving a marsh.

==== Sub-divisions ====
Topographic map with the different parts of the Vercors

The central part of the Vercors Massif is divided into several regions.

The Coulmes, in the north-west, are heavily covered in forest. Folds of Urgonian limestone are rounded, making the area appear mountainous.

The four mountains area has been developed for tourism and skiing but is also known for its traditional activities such as the breeding of dairy cows and cheese making. The main villages, Autrans, Méaudre, Lans-en-Vercors, and Villard-de-Lans, are spread over two plateaus covered by wooded hills.

The Drômois Vercors is an area made up of a number of smaller plateaus. In the north of the Drômois Vercors there are several gorges which are traversed by roads cut into the cliffs. Grassy areas are used as pastures in the summer months, and the biannual migration (transhumance) of animals is a period of celebration for the people of Die.

The Haut-Plateaux (high plateaus) are the highest wilderness areas of the massif. The area is managed and the pastures are used for grazing in the summer.

At the fringes of the massif, the Vercors regional park has four geographical areas. The Royans, the north-west foothills are the location of walnuts growing. Three valleys descend to the edge of the Royans: the Gorges de la Bourne, the cirque of the Combe Laval, and the Échevis valley, including the Grands and the Petits Goulets.

The Gervanne, in the south-west, is a rugged area of hills at the foot of the plateau, with picturesque villages. It looks towards Crest.

The Diois is a part of the Drôme valley around Die. This region has a Mediterranean character, with vineyards and fields of lavender. It acts as a buffer between Gervanne and the interior of the massif.

The Trièves, in the east, is a low hilly plateau, which lies between the highest summits of the Vercors and the gorge carved out by the Drac.

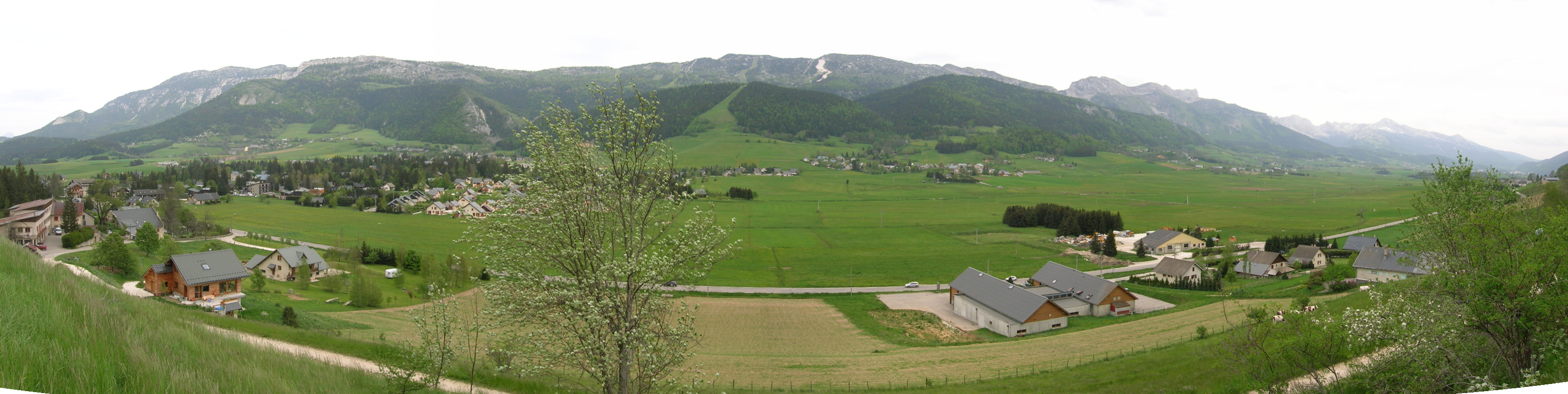
Panoramic view of the main ridge of the massif, from the Moucherotte (on the left), to the Grande Moucherolle (on the right), as well as the val de Lans.

==== Principal summits ====
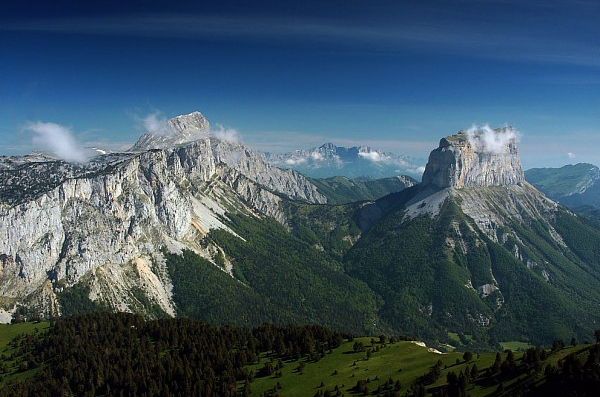
View of the Grand Veymont and Mont Aiguille from the south

From north to south:

- Le Moucherotte, 1,901 m (6,237 ft), the summit which dominates Grenoble, most northerly of the massif
- Le Pic Saint-Michel, 1,966 m (6,450 ft)
- Roc Cornafion, 2,049 m (6,722 ft)
- Les Arêtes du Gerbier, 2,109 m (6,919 ft)
- La Grande Moucherolle, 2,284 m (7,493 ft)
- La Petite Moucherolle, 2,156 m (7,073 ft)
- La Tête des Chaudières, 2,029 m (6,657 ft)
- Les Rochers de la Balme, 2,063 m (6,768 ft)
- Le Sommet de Malaval, 2,097 m (6,880 ft)
- Le Grand Veymont, 2,341 m (7,680 ft), highest point of the massif
- Le Mont Aiguille, 2,087 m (6,847 ft), with its characteristic silhouette, its first ascent in 1492 was the birth of alpinism
- Le Dôme ou Pié Ferré, 2,041 m (6,696 ft), to the east of Die, in the Glandasse uplands

==== Principal road cols ====
By descending altitude:

- Col du Mont Noir, 1,421 m (4,662 ft), between Malleval-en-Vercors and Rencurel
- Col de l'Allimas, 1,352 m (4,436 ft), between Gresse-en-Vercors and Saint-Michel-les-Portes
- Col de la Chau, 1,337 m (4,386 ft), between Vassieux-en-Vercors and Bouvante
- Col de la Bataille, 1,313 m (4,308 ft), between Léoncel and Bouvante
- Col de Rousset, 1,254 m (4,114 ft) (tunnel altitude), between Die and Saint-Agnan-en-Vercors
- Col de Saint-Alexis, 1,222 m (4,009 ft), between Vassieux-en-Vercors and Saint-Agnan-en-Vercors
- Col de la Croix-Perrin, 1,218 m (3,996 ft), between Lans-en-Vercors and Autrans – Méaudre
- Col de Carri, 1,202 m (3,944 ft), between La Chapelle-en-Vercors and Bouvante
- Col de la Portette, 1,175 m (3,855 ft), in Bouvante
- Col de l'Arzelier, 1,154 m (3,786 ft), between Château-Bernard and Le Gua
- Col de Tourniol, 1,145 m (3,757 ft), between Léoncel and Barbières
- Col de Proncel, 1,100 m (3,600 ft), between Vassieux-en-Vercors and La Chapelle-en-Vercors
- Col des Limouches, 1,086 m (3,563 ft), between Léoncel and Peyrus
- Col de Romeyère, 1,069 m (3,507 ft), between Rencurel and Saint-Gervais
- Col de la Machine, 1,011 m (3,317 ft), between Saint-Jean-en-Royans and Bouvante.

The Tunnel du Mortier links Montaud with Autrans, at an altitude of 1,391 metres (4,564 ft). It was closed on 20 April 1992 after a landslide of 20,000 m^{3} of rock which involved part of the slope to the north of the route. The instability of the slopes have proved an impediment for the realisation of further work below the site, particularly work on the gorges d'Engins to Sassenage road, the D531.

==== Principal caves ====
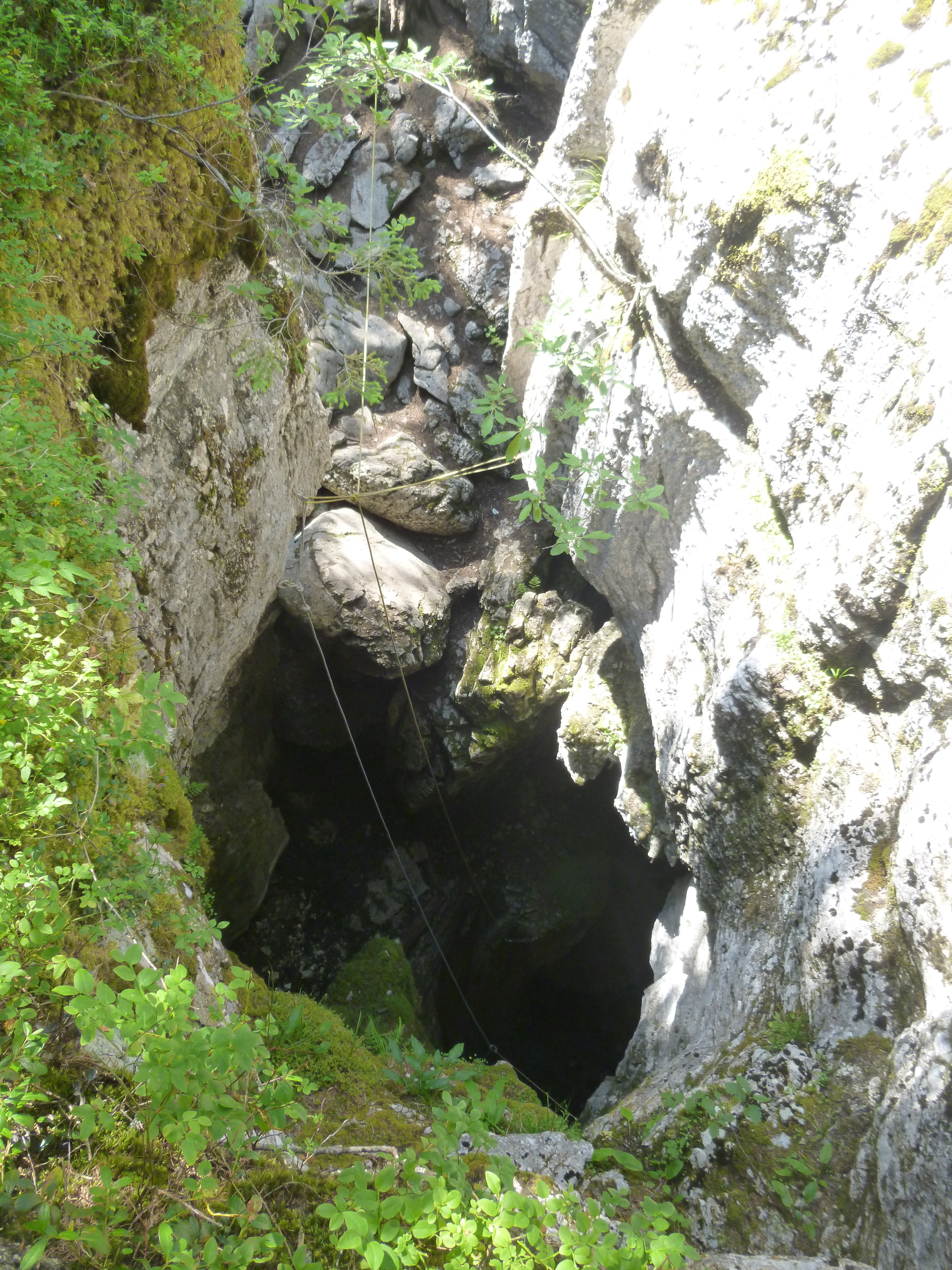
Entrance to Gouffre Berger, the deepest cave in the Vercors

The commune in which the cave is situated is given in italics.

- Réseau du Gouffre Berger, d'Engins en Isère, 45,118 metres (148,025 ft) long, 1,271 metres (4,170 ft) deep.
- Réseau du Trou qui souffle
  , Autrans-Méaudre en Vercors, 49,300 metres (161,700 ft) long, 670 metres (2,200 ft) deep.
- Réseau du Clot d'Aspres
  , Villard-de-Lans, 42,000 metres (138,000 ft) long, 1,066 metres (3,497 ft) deep.
- Réseau de Coufin-Chevaline
  , Choranche, 32,301 metres (105,974 ft) long, 425 metres (1,394 ft) deep.
- Grotte de Gournier
  , Choranche, 18,000 metres (59,000 ft) long, 680 metres (2,230 ft) deep.
- Antre des Damnés
  , Corrençon-en-Vercors, 5,000 metres (16,000 ft) long, 865 metres (2,838 ft) deep.
- Grotte de la Luire
  , Saint-Agnan-en-Vercors, 37,563 metres (123,238 ft) long, 547 metres (1,795 ft) deep.
- Réseau des Chuats, Bouvante, 48,171 metres (158,041 ft) long, 368 metres (1,207 ft) deep.

The Grotte de Bournillon, located in the commune of Châtelus, has the highest cave opening in Europe at 105 metres (344 ft).

== Climate ==
The climate of the Vercors due to its elevation is much more rigorous than the lowlands surrounding the massif. The village of La-Chapelle-en-Vercors, approximately in the center of the massif, has a Dfb climate under the Köppen Classification system. Winters are cold; summers are warm; and precipitation, often snow in the winter, is abundant in all seasons.

Climate data for La Chapelle-en-Vercors, France. Coordinates: 44.971°N 5.419°E. Elevation: 2,948 feet (899 m).
Month	Jan	Feb	Mar	Apr	May	Jun	Jul	Aug	Sep	Oct	Nov	Dec	Year
Mean daily maximum °C (°F)	3.2 (37.8)	4.6 (40.3)	9.3 (48.7)	12.4 (54.3)	16.4 (61.5)	20.2 (68.4)	23.0 (73.4)	22.4 (72.3)	19.0 (66.2)	13.4 (56.1)	7.9 (46.2)	3.8 (38.8)	13.0 (55.3)
Daily mean °C (°F)	−0.6 (30.9)	0.4 (32.7)	4.3 (39.7)	7.3 (45.1)	11.0 (51.8)	14.6 (58.3)	16.9 (62.4)	16.5 (61.7)	13.7 (56.7)	8.7 (47.7)	4.2 (39.6)	0.3 (32.5)	8.1 (46.6)
Mean daily minimum °C (°F)	−4.3 (24.3)	−3.8 (25.2)	−0.6 (30.9)	2.2 (36.0)	5.7 (42.3)	9.0 (48.2)	10.9 (51.6)	10.6 (51.1)	8.4 (47.1)	4.1 (39.4)	0.5 (32.9)	−3.1 (26.4)	3.9 (39.1)
Average precipitation mm (inches)	79 (3.1)	79 (3.1)	88 (3.5)	76 (3.0)	96 (3.8)	91 (3.6)	63 (2.5)	80 (3.1)	90 (3.5)	95 (3.7)	93 (3.7)	87 (3.4)	1,017 (40)
Source: "La Chapelle-en-Vercors," , accessed 30 April 2020

=== Geology ===
The constituent rocks of the Vercors were formed by sedimentation about 165 million years ago, in the middle Jurassic period, at the bottom of the Piemont-Liguria Ocean. The deposition of animal material formed limestone, with detritus rocks, formed primarily from the erosion of marl from the Variscan orogeny formed the massif in a period marked by changing climatic conditions and ocean depth. At Diois and Trièves is a layer of the massif, formed in the Tithonian age. Then, about 130 million years ago, in the Cretaceous period, a rise in temperatures combined with shallow waters led to the development of coral reefs, which abounded with molluscs, particularly rudists. These were the origin of the Urgonian Limestone which forms the upper part of the massif, more prominently in the northern half. This primitive fauna left numerous fossils, some of which have been found at a site near Rencurel in the Coulmes.

In the Paleogene period, the Tethys ocean closed up and at the start of the Miocene, the raising of the Alps involved the thrusting of a nappe to the west. Sedimentary rocks were raised 2,000 metres (6,600 ft) above the current location of the Massif des Écrins and faulted and folded in the process.

Subsequent marine transgressions were responsible for secondary sedimentation in the basins. There was widening of the gorges and erosion of the cliffs from runoff, leading to the formation of the molasse in the Royans and also in the valleys of Lans, Autrans, and Rencurel. At the close of the Miocene, a new period of uplifting brought about the final receding of the sea.

Once formed, the massif underwent severe erosion, which accentuated the relief. The different synclines grew larger, eventually forming valleys including those of Autrans, Méaudre and Lans, Villard, Corrençon, the Col de Romeyère and the Col de Rousset. The water hollowed out the cirque of Archiane, the steephead valley of Bournillon, and the Combe Laval.

== In popular culture ==
The Vercors have appeared in many films, including;

- La Bride sur le cou (1961)
- Wish Me Luck (1987) Season 3
- Une hirondelle a fait le printemps (2001)
- The Butterfly (2002)
- To Paint or Make Love (2006)
- My son (2017)

== See also ==
- Battle of Vercors – 1944 World War II battle
- Villard-de-Lans (cattle breed) – French cattle breed
