= Frère Ogérien =

Jean Auguste Celestin Étienne, more commonly known by his title as a Roman Catholic brother, Frère Ogérien (born in Gresse-en-Vercors, Isère, in 1825 - died in Manhattanville, near New York, in 1869) was a French naturalist and geologist.

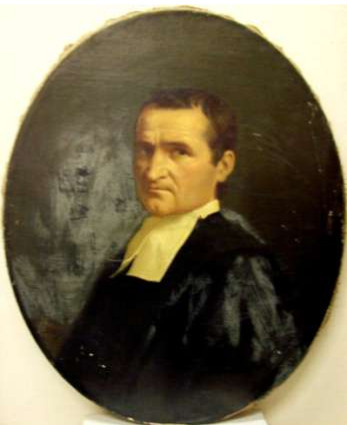
Ogérien by Alexandre Grellet (known as Frère Athanase) (1867)

Frère Ogérien was born as Jean Celestin Étienne on December 9, 1825, in l'Eglise, a hamlet of Gresse, from Jean Etienne, a ploughman, and Marie Anne or Marianne Reboul. On April 18, 1844, at the age of 18, he entered the Institute of the Brothers of the Christian Schools at Lyon as a novice and changed his name to Frère Ogérien while being there. In 1854, he was entrusted with the direction of the Christian schools of Lons-le-Saunier where he remained for 13 years. However, his health deteriorated and he spent a season in the spa town of Vichy, before going back to Lyon where he organised cabinets of curiosities for some boarding schools. In 1857, the Société d'émulation du Jura abandoned its museum and library in the city of Lons-le-Saunier and Frère Ogérien was appointed assistant curator, under the curator Nicolas Piard, for Natural History and Mineralogy. Frère Ogérien presented two agronomic maps of the Jura at the Exhibition of 1860 which earned him a gold medal.

In April 1869 he was appointed by his order to accompany a fellow visitor on an inspection tour to the United States. They arrived on 8 May at Manhattanville, a New York College, run by the Society of the Sacred Heart of Jesus. They spent some time in St. Louis. He died of apoplexy on December 15, 1869, at Manhattanville College, at the age of 44 years. His great work is the edition of the l' Histoire naturelle du Jura et des départements voisins ("Natural History of the Jura and neighbouring departments") which he wrote the major part of. He entrusted the writing of the botanical part to Eugene Michalet, and after the death of Michalet to the botanist Charles Grenier.
