= Grand Veymont =

Mountain in France

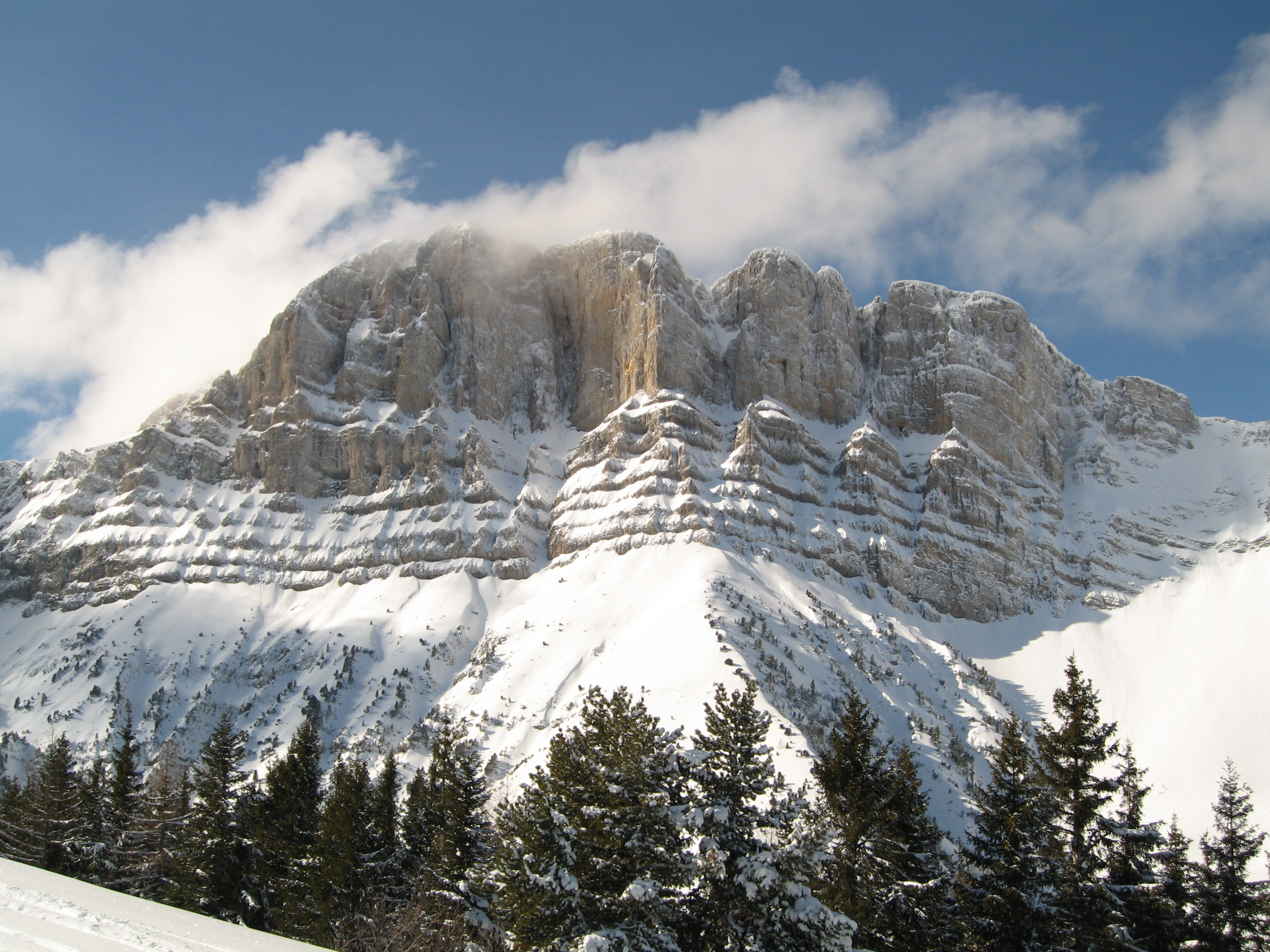
- Le Grand Veymont from the east

Highest point
- Elevation: 2,341 m (7,680 ft)
- Prominence: 1,165 m (3,822 ft)
- Coordinates: 44°52′12″N 05°31′37″E

Geography
- Location within France
- Location: Isère, Rhône-Alpes, France
- Parent range: Vercors Plateau

Climbing
- Easiest route: Hike

The Grand Veymont (Le Grand Veymont), a mountain in the district of Gresse-en-Vercors, part of the department of Isère, France, is the highest point (2341 metres) of the Massif du Vercors, but not the highest of the Vercors Regional Natural Park (which is the Rocher Rond at 2453m). It has a prominence of 1165 metres and an isolation of 26.88 kilometres.

== Location ==
It is situated between le Pas de la Ville to the north and le Pas des Chattons to the south, and is part of the eastern edge of the high plateau of the Massif du Vercors. It is preceded to the north by (north to south) "le Rocher de Séguret" (the Rock of Séguret, 2051 metres), "Roche Rousse" (Red Rock, 2105 metres), and "le Sommet de Pierre-Blanche" (the Summit of White Rock, 2106 metres) and followed to the south (north to south) by Petit Veymont or Aiguillette (little Veymont or small needle, 2120 metres) and Mont Aiguille (Mount Needle, 2085 metres). Due to its location in the Parc du Vercors, it is far from any paved road. A moderately easy route to the summit involves walking about 10 km, hiking through the backcountry.

== Geology ==
The limestone cliffs evident on the eastern face of the Grand Veymont are composed of Glandasse or Urgonian limestone of Lower Barremian age, laid down between 125 and 130 million years ago. The bedding planes dip at roughly 30°, the angle of the western slopes. Its geology is similar to that of the "haut plateaux" of the Vercors Massif to the west, but differs from that of the valley to the east, which is monoclinal in structure, although still of Lower Cretaceous age. In the last ice age, a glacial tongue descended from the north-eastern slopes into the valley of Gresse-en-Vercors, depositing a glacial moraine which is visible today to the west of the village. However, there is no longer any permanent ice or snow on le Grand Veymont.

== Aircraft crash ==
On 10 February 2007, a twin-engine light aircraft flying from London to Cannes disappeared in a snowstorm over le Grand Veymont, crashing into the mountainside and killing all three people aboard. The bodies and wreckage were recovered less than 24 hours later, at around 1960 metres above sea level, close to the Pas de la Ville, after a rescue operation involving more than one hundred policemen, firemen, mountain rescue specialists, and three helicopters equipped with infra-red cameras.

== Gallery ==
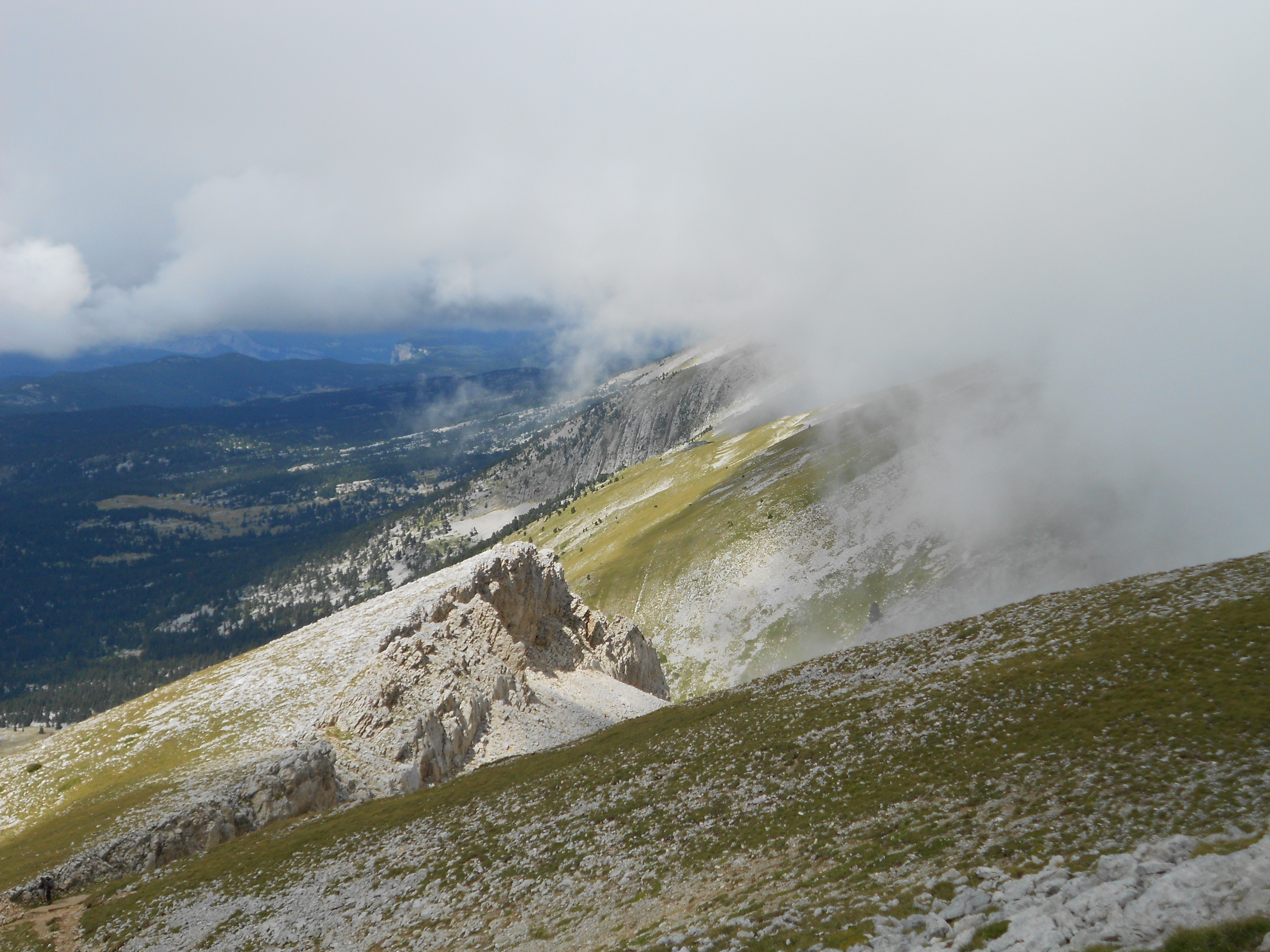
The view to the North
