= Réseau du Clot d'Aspres =

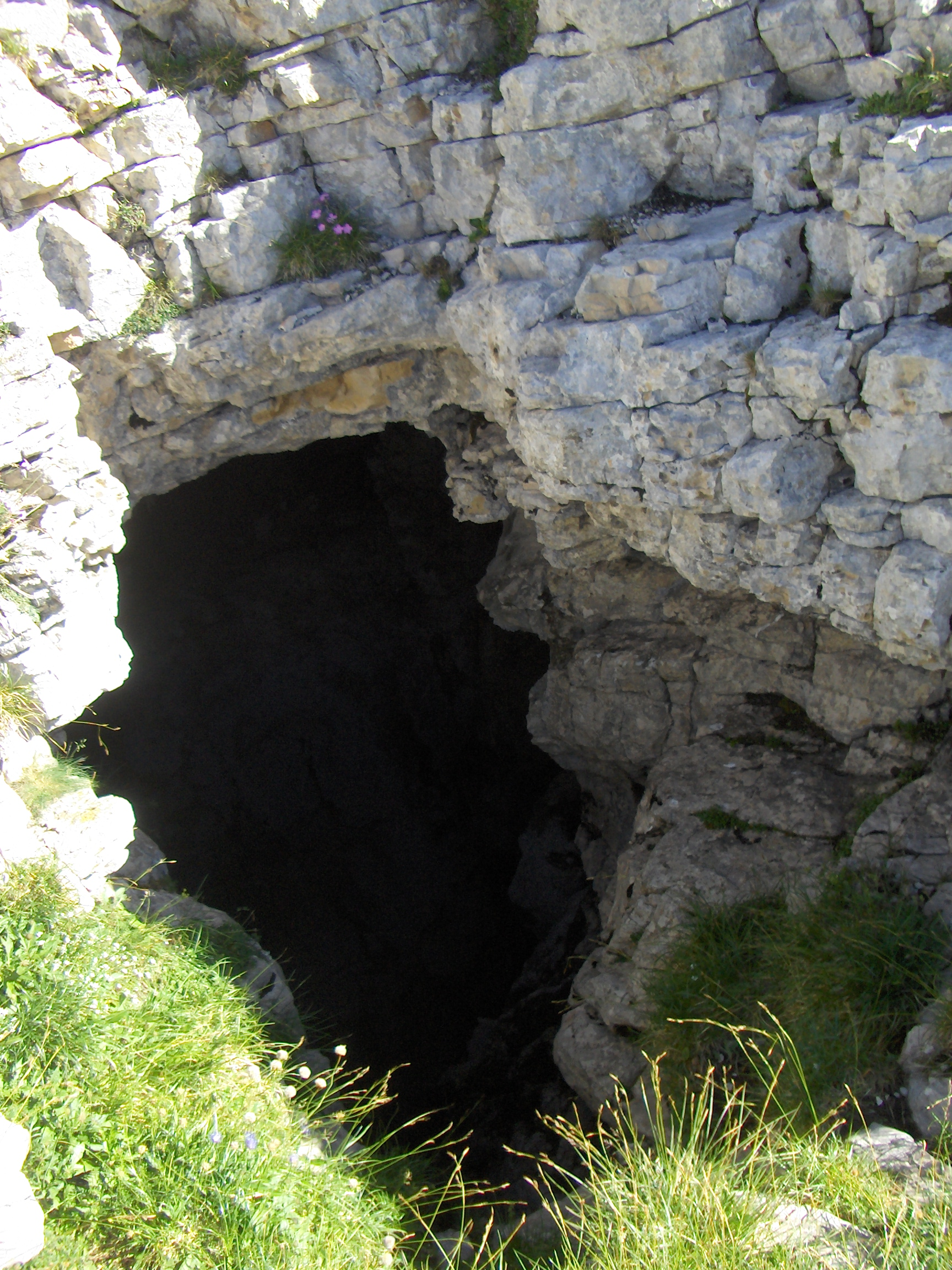
- Entrance scialet de la Nymphe émue
- Interactive map of Réseau du Clot d'Aspres
- Location: Villard-de-Lans
- Coordinates: 45°01′11″N 5°34′34″E
- Depth: 1,066 metres (3,497 ft)
- Length: 42,000 metres (138,000 ft)
- Elevation: 2,030 m (6,660 ft)
- Discovery: 1902
- Geology: Limestone
- Entrances: 12

The Réseau du Clot d'Aspres is a cave system located mainly under the valley of Clot d'Aspres, which lies within the commune of Villard-de-Lans in the north of the Vercors Massif, in Isère, France. This extensive karst system contains 42 kilometres (26 mi) of passages over a height range of 1,066 meters. The highest point is upstream of the Oréade cave +74 metres (243 ft), and the lowest point is the siphon of the Nuits-Blanches scialet which has been dived to a depth of 34 metres (112 ft).

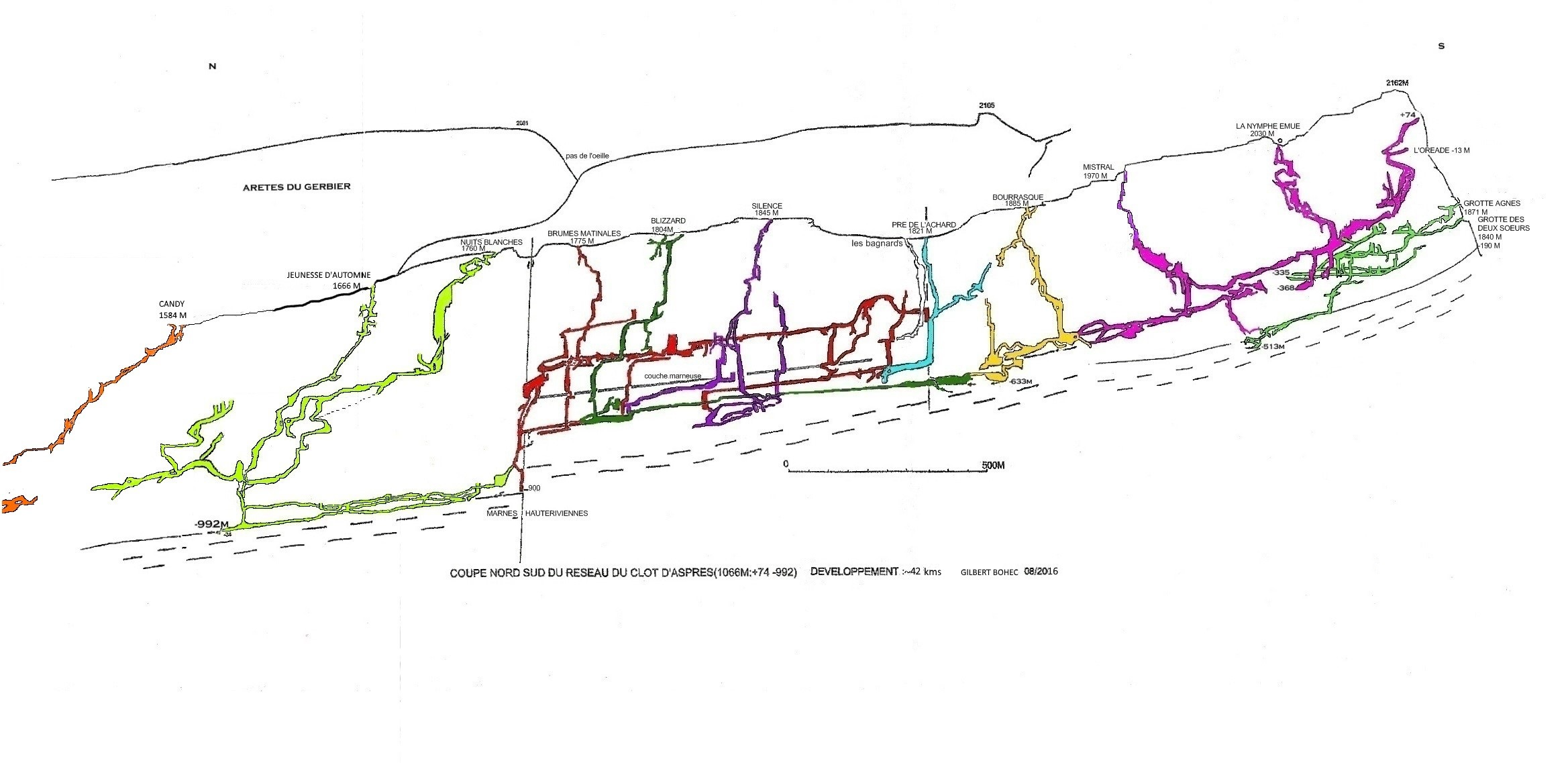
North-south section of the Clot d'Aspres network.

The Réseau du Clot d'Aspres is the second deepest cave in the Vercors massif, and only one of two deeper than 1,000 metres (3,300 ft). The combined waters of the caves drain into a master cave and emerge at the Goule-Blanche Karst spring (45°04′01″N 5°31′01″E) in the Bourne Gorge, 832 metres (2,730 ft) above sea level.

== Geology ==
The cave system is developed within Urgonian Limestone, with the master cave developed at its base on the Hauterivian marls. There is major horizontal development at an intermediate level in the limestone.

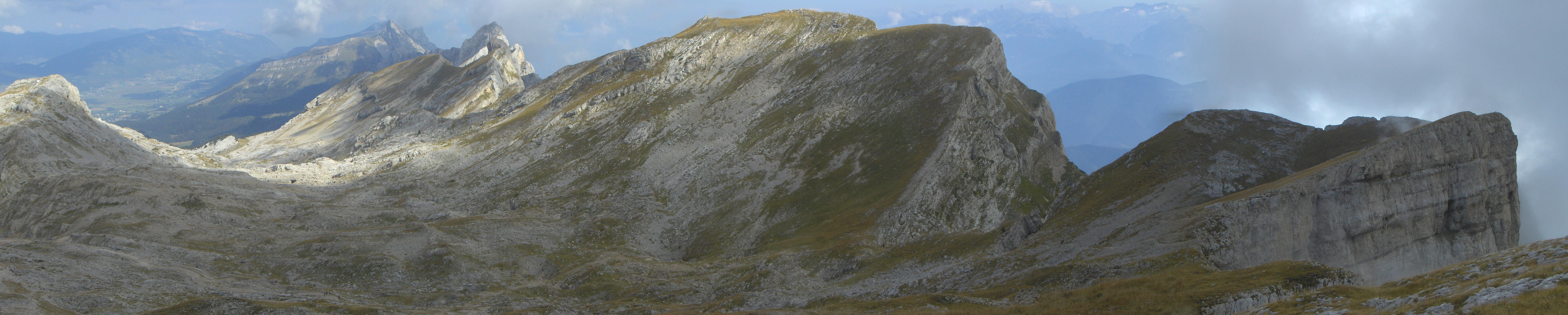
The valley of Clot d'Aspres seen from the south.

== Explorations ==
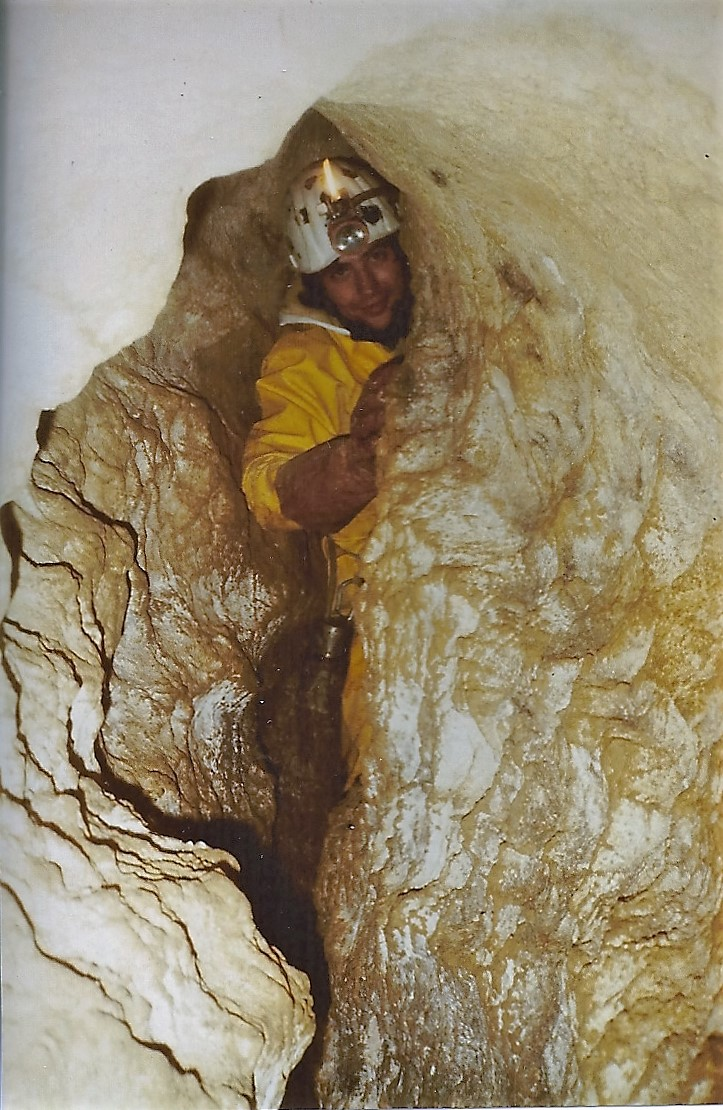
A narrow meander of the scialet of Brumes-Matinales.

Explorations in the system began with the visit to grotte des Deux-Sœurs in 1902 by Fonne and Muller. In 1952 the Grenoble section of the CAF of Lyon including Pierre Chevalier explored the réseau des Grenoblois to a depth of −181 metres (−594 ft) (Note: In caving, the negative or positive measurements of height levels are defined in relation to at a reference point which is the known entrance to the network, the highest in altitude.). Further explorations by the Lyonnais of the Clan de la Verna in 1954 reached a siphon at −315 metres (−1,033 ft).

On the plateau, from the scialet de la Nymphe-Émue, located 200 meters above this cave, a descent of 341 metres (1,119 ft) was carried out in 1964 by the Clan des Tritons de Lyon, but without discovering a connection. In September 1986 a group of Drôme and the caving group Le Graoully broke through into the main system, discovering kilometres of galleries from the scialet de la Nymphe-Émue and a new entrance: the grotte de l'Oréade, located on the outer flank of the Clot, in the commune of Gua.

At the end of 1987, the Spéléo Club du Veymont (SCV) explored the scialet de la Bourrasque to where it connected with the scialet de la Nymphe-Émue at a depth of 370 metres (1,210 ft).

In 1988, the scialet des Brumes-Martinales was explored to a depth of 645 metres (2,116 ft) by the SCV. In the same year, Drôme cavers, unattached to any clubs, found the scialet du Pré de l'Achard which they descended to −410 metres (−1,350 ft).

In 1989, le scialet du Blizzard was explored by the SCV and found to connect to the scialet des Brumes-Matinales at a depth of 521 metres (1,709 ft). In the process, the SCV explores the scialet du Silence to −542 metres (−1,778 ft).

In May 1990, the scialet des Nuits-Blanches was discovered by the Spéléo club du Veymont and connected to the master cave at a depth of −688 metres (−2,257 ft).

In 1991, the Drôme cavers found a junction between the grotte des Deux-Sœurs and the scialet de la Nymphe-Émue. The upper network now includes four entrances: the Deux-Sœurs, l'Oréade, the Nymphe-Émue and the Bourrasque. In the summer of 1991, the SCV discovered galleries that connected with the scialets of the Brumes-Matinales, the Blizzard, the Silence and the Pré de l'Achard. These passages are referred to as the median network.

In May 1993 the sump of the scialet des Nuits Blanches was dived by Frédéric Poggia to −34 metres (−112 ft).

The upstream section of the Blizzard collector was explored by the Fontaine Mountain caving group in July 1994, after climbing a 25-metre (82 ft) waterfall. A superb river passage was ascended for 700 metres (2,300 ft) until it ended in a sump. This was dived in September 1995 by Frédéric Poggia, resulting in the discovery of 800 metres (2,600 ft) of further river passage with two new siphons and a boulder choke.

The downstream passages and the upstream passages and median networks were connected through the master cave, by the Grenoble Cavers of the French Alpine Club (SGCAF) in 2008, by pushing the boulder chokes, making it the second 1,000-metre (3,300 ft) deep system in the Vercors.

On October 26, 2015, the SGCAF discovered the entrance to a 70-metre (230 ft) deep shaft named Jeunesse d'Automne. This scialet was integrated into the réseau du Clot d'Aspres by connecting it to the Nuits-Blanches on November 28, 2015. The junction between the two cavities is just before the terminal siphon of the Nuits-Blanches.

In 2015, 2016 and 2017, explorations were concentrated downstream. The issue is whether the grotte du Clot d'Aspres (extensions discovered by the Clan des Tritons), the scialets de la Chambre-Froide and du Candy (explored by the SGCAF) communicate with the network. A new cave, the Puits Sans Fond-Arche de Noé, located under the summit of Agathe, one of the Two Sisters, with a pitch of 200 metres (660 ft) is potentially also part of the network, but no connection has yet been found as of 2019.

== Gallery ==
Les scialets

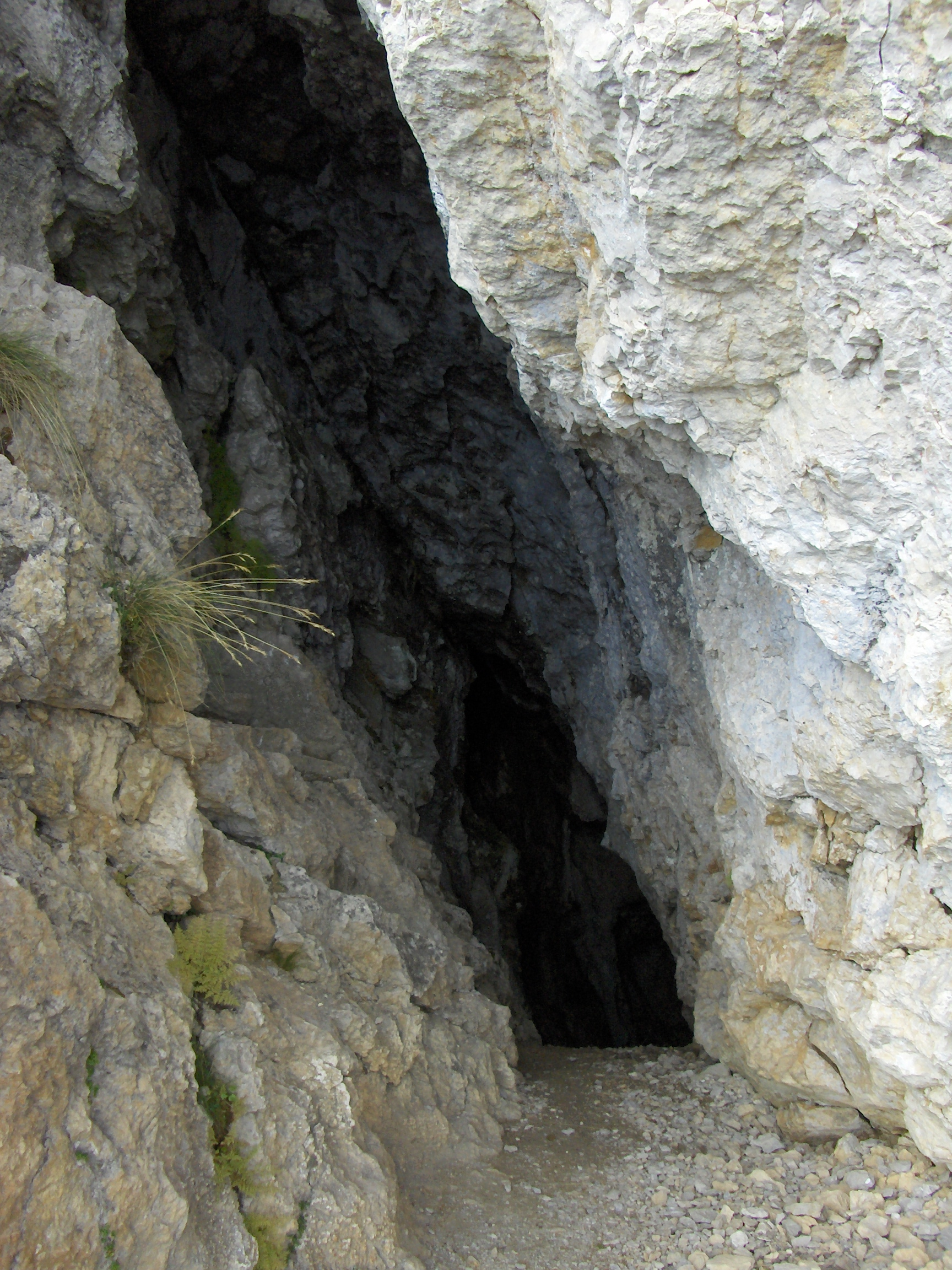
Grotte des Deux-Sœurs.

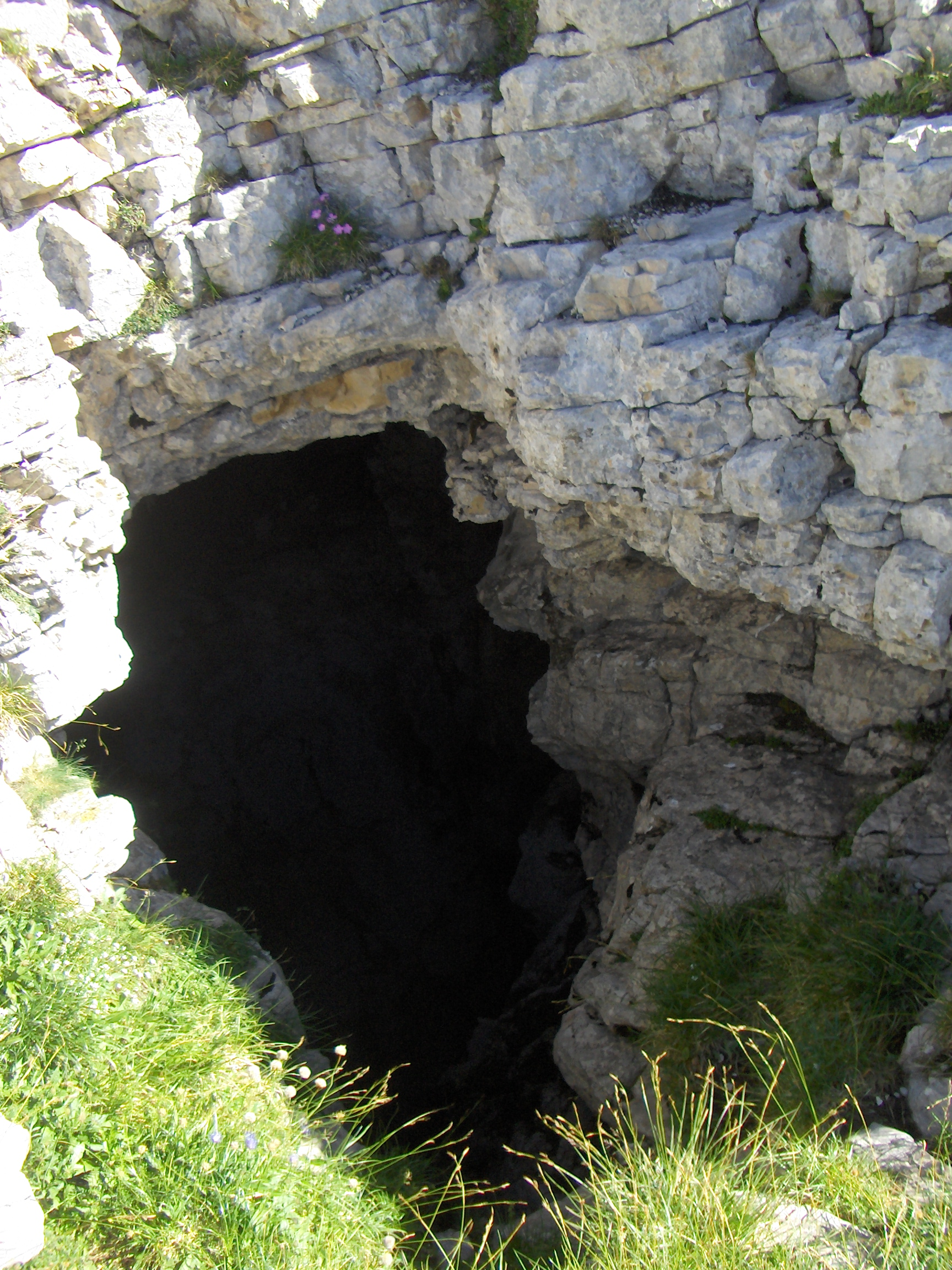
Nymphe-Émue.

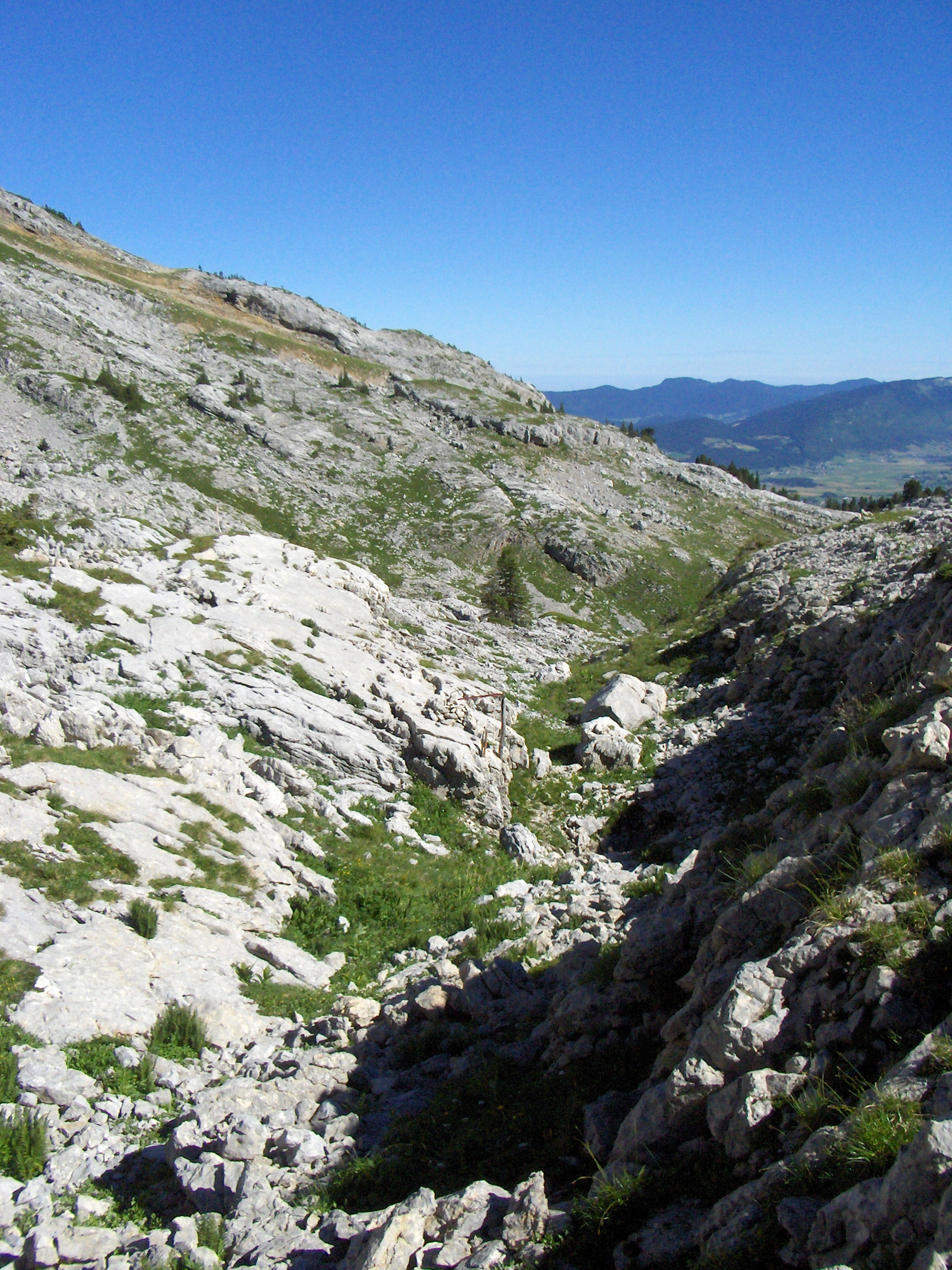
Entrance du scialet du Blizzard.

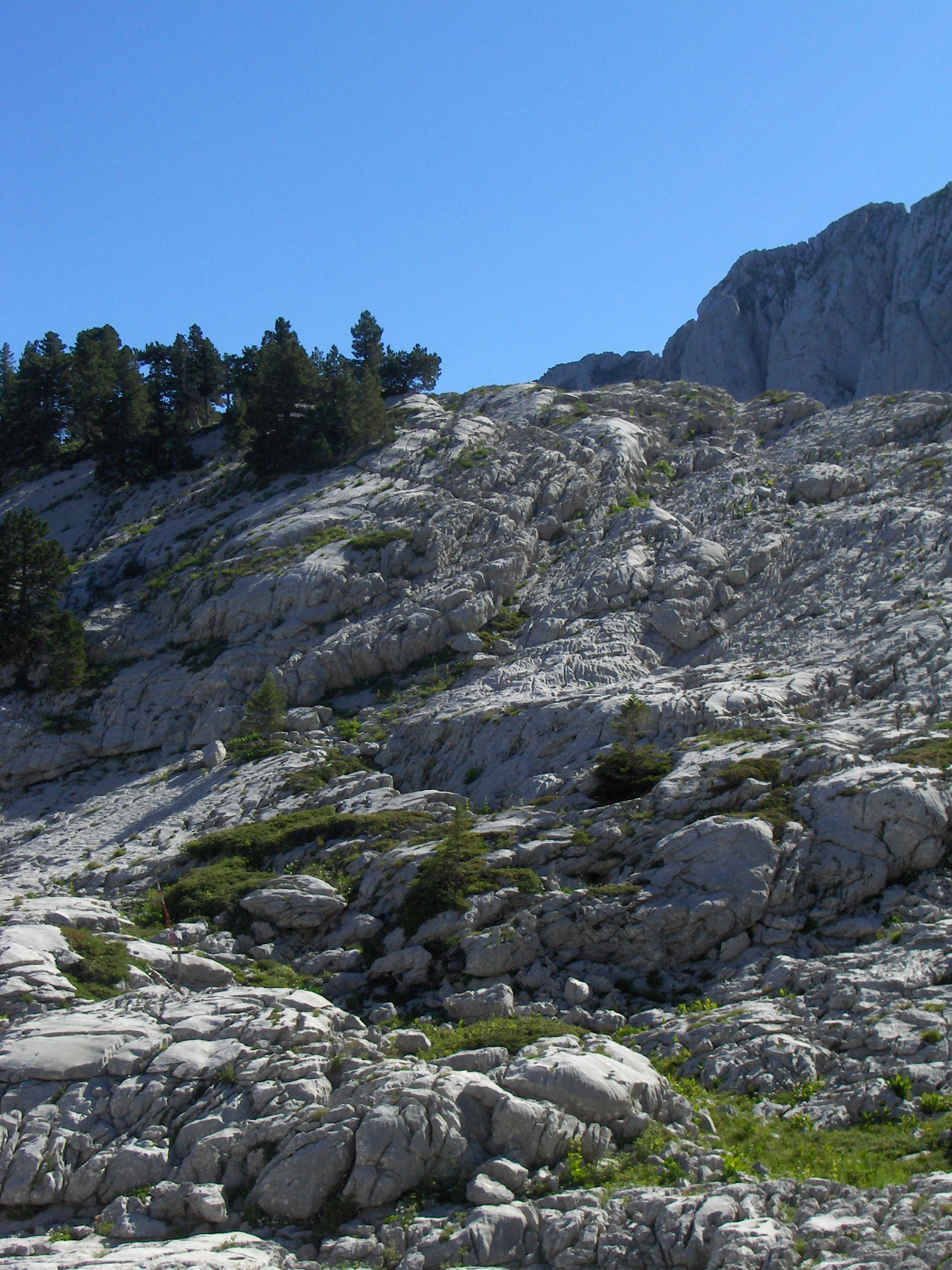
Entrance of scialet des Nuits Blanches.

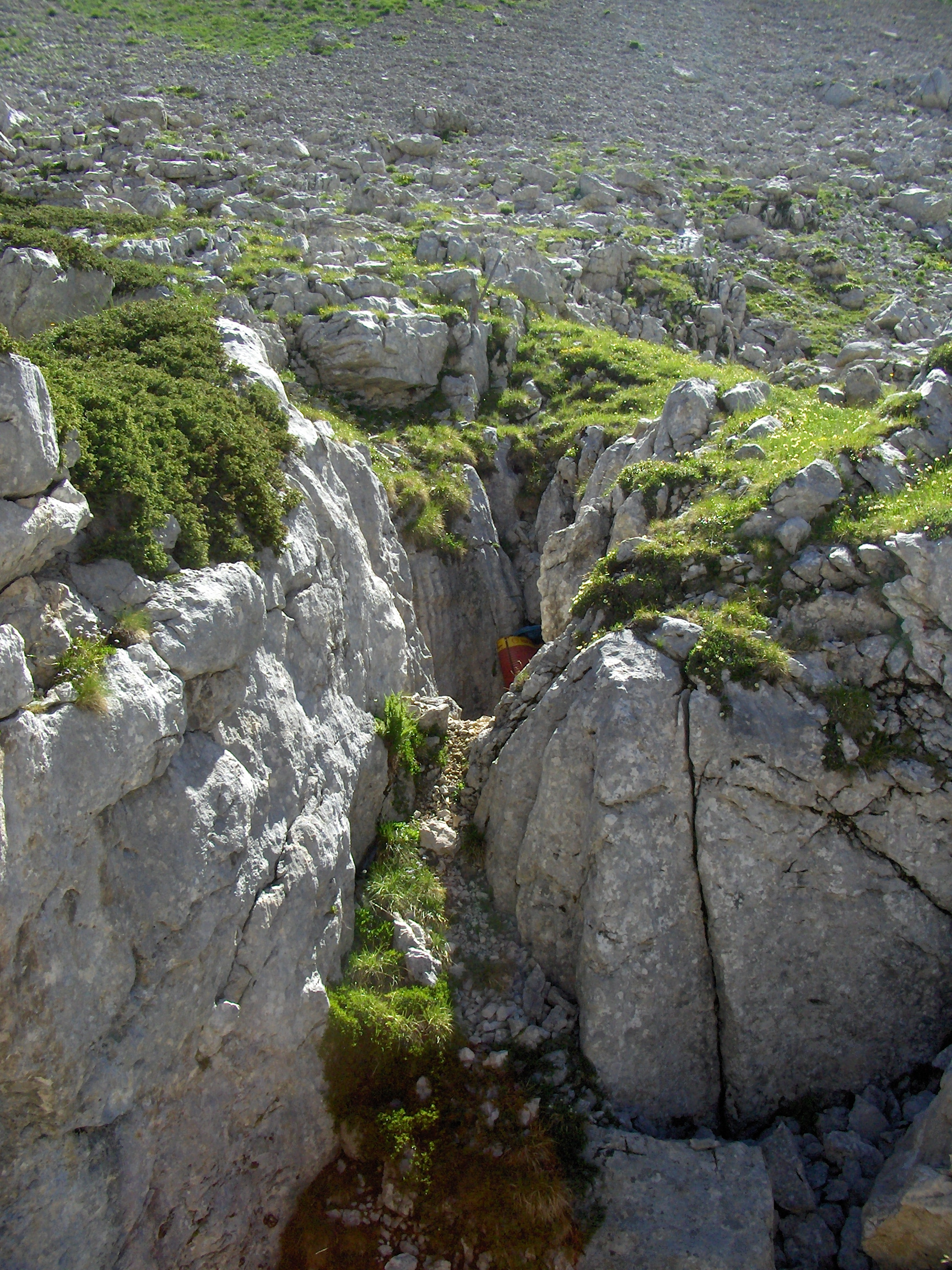
Entrance of scialet du Pré de l’Achard

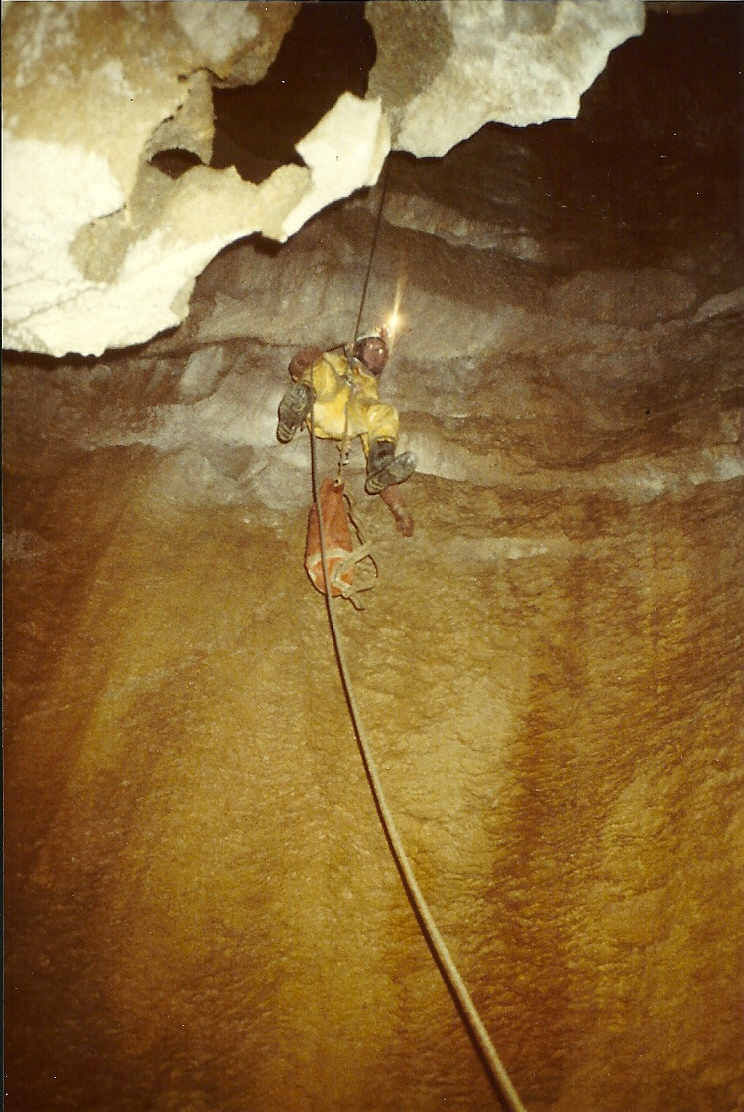
Brumes-Matinales (puits du Centenaire).

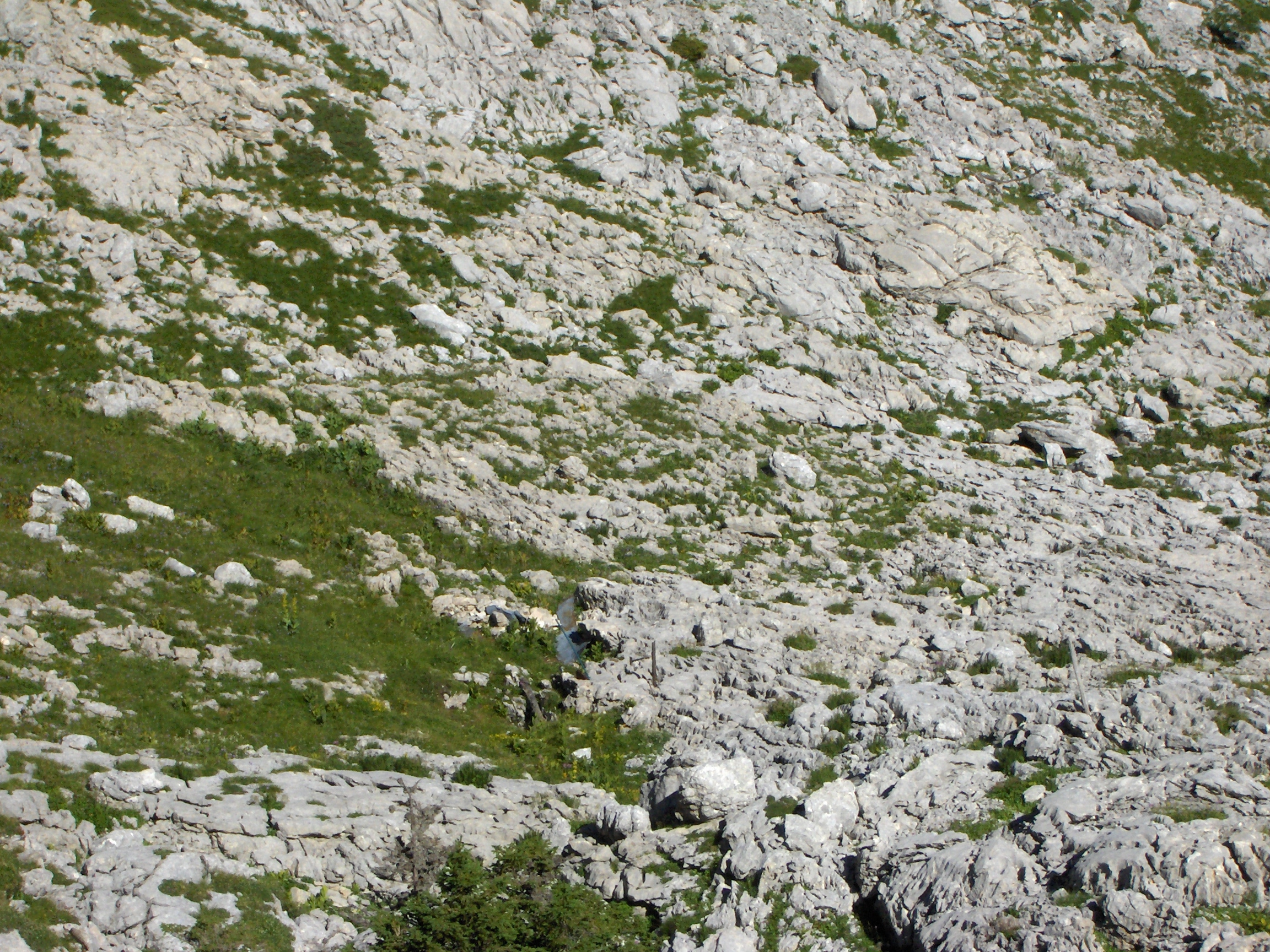
Entrance du scialet des Brumes Matinales.

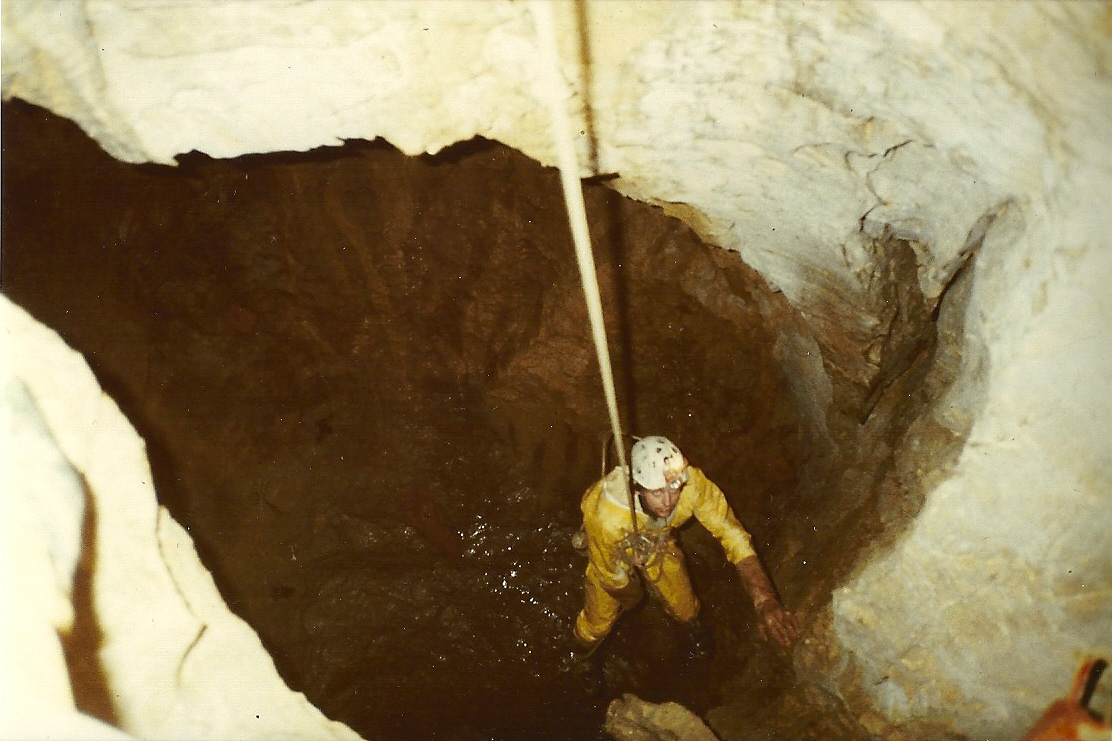
Brumes-Matinales -200 m.

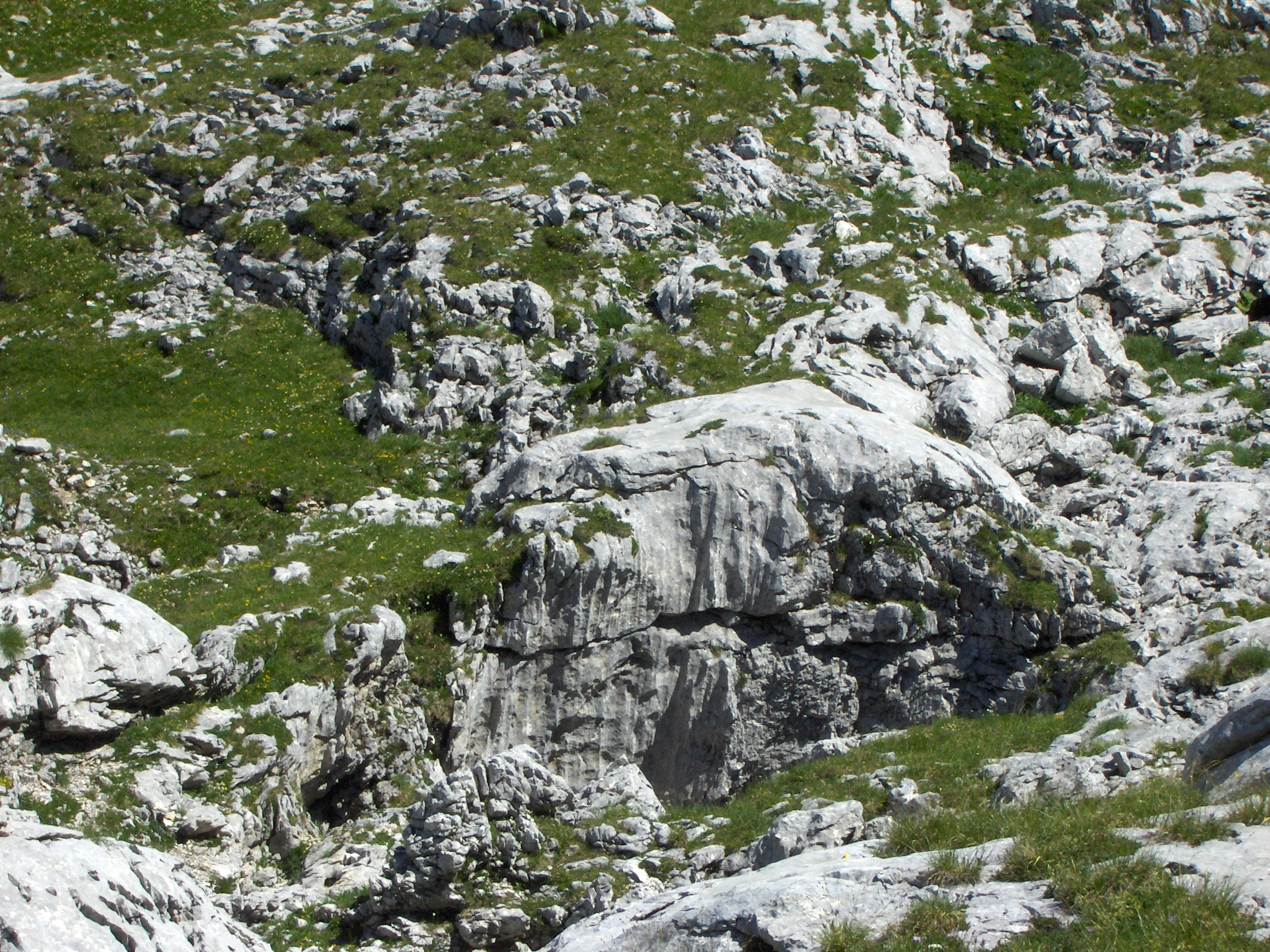
Entrance of scialet du Silence.

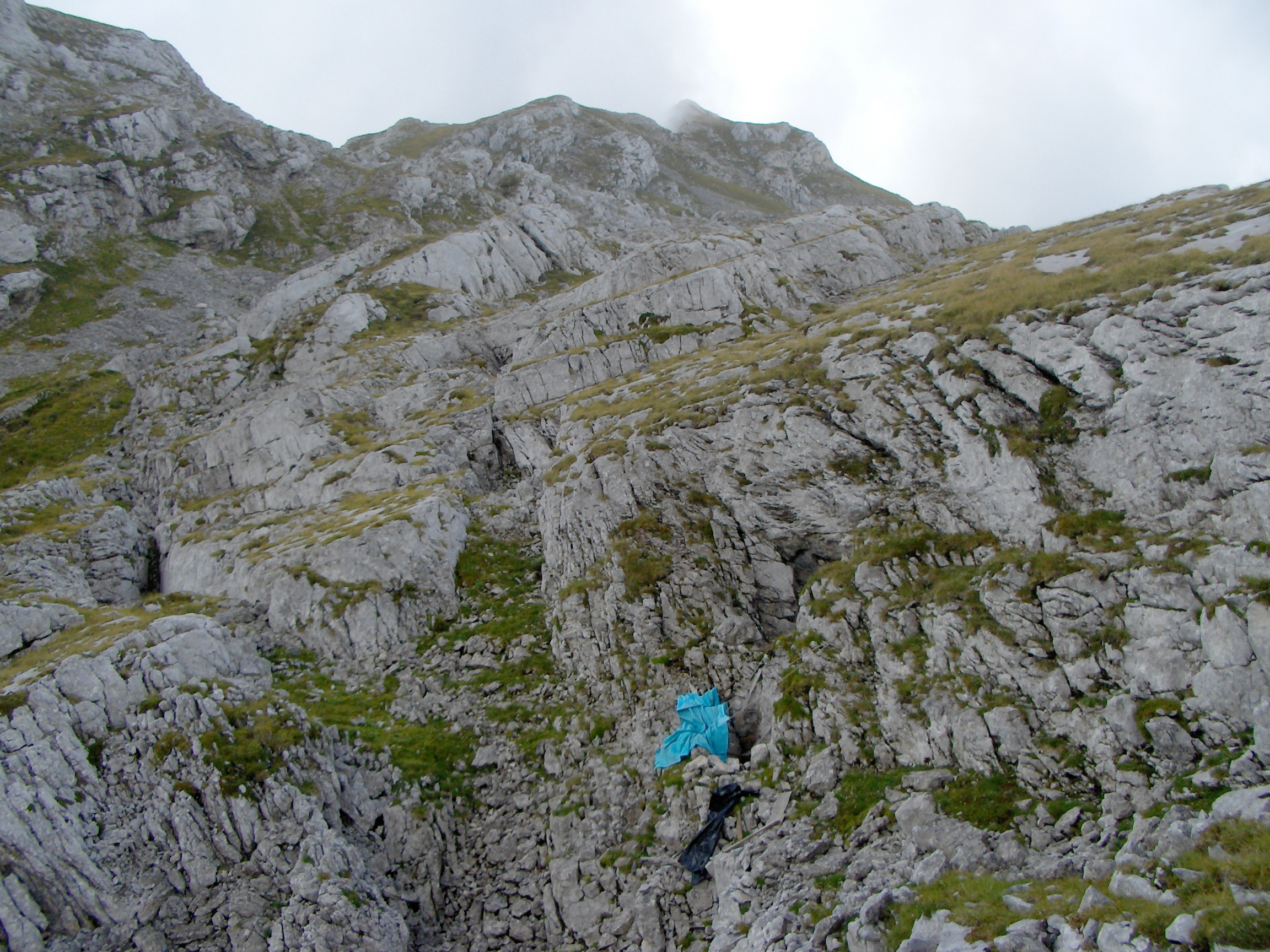
Entrance of scialet du Mistral

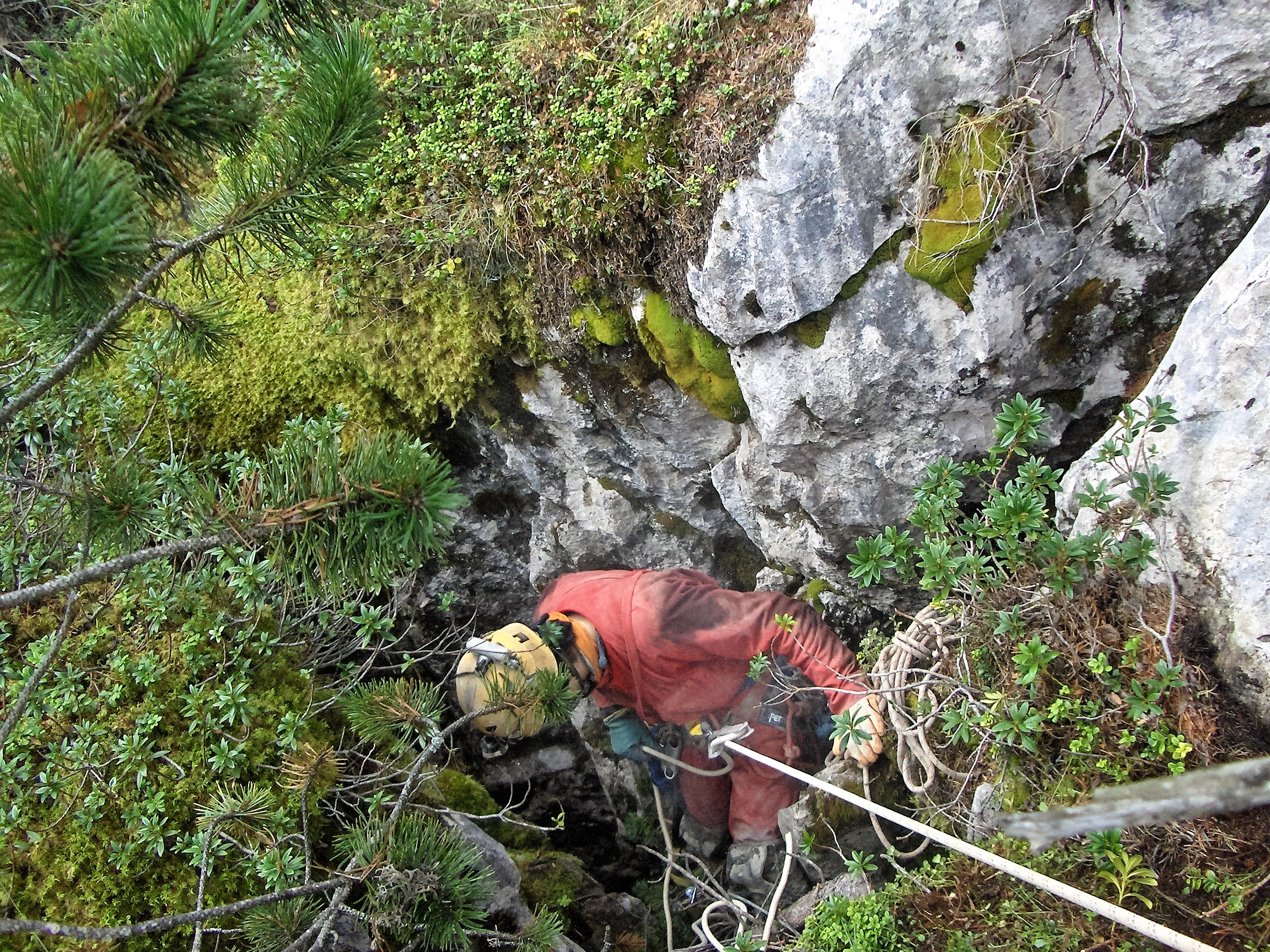
Entrance of scialet Jeunesse d’Automne

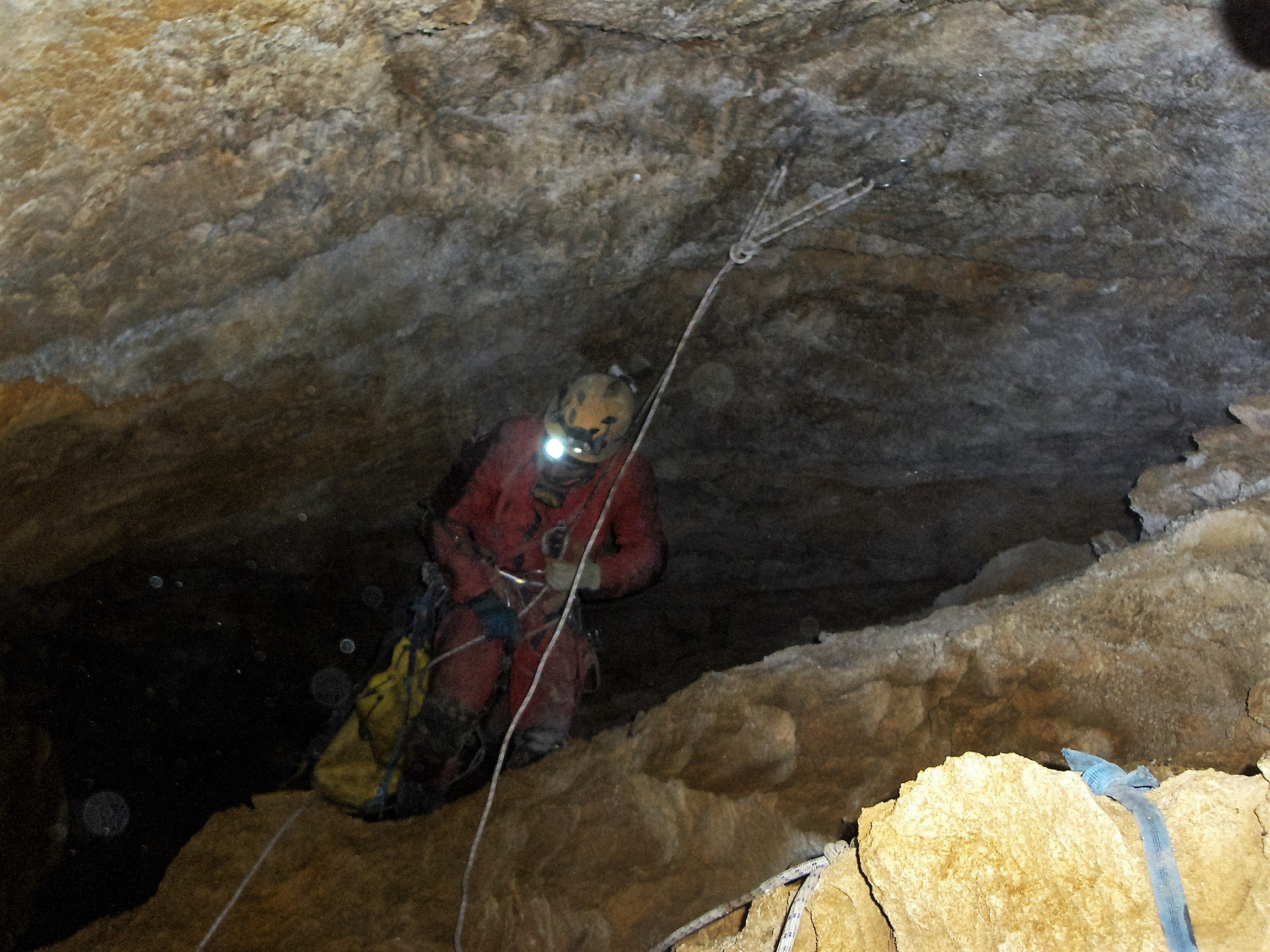
Jeunesse d'Automne (puits des Ancêtres).
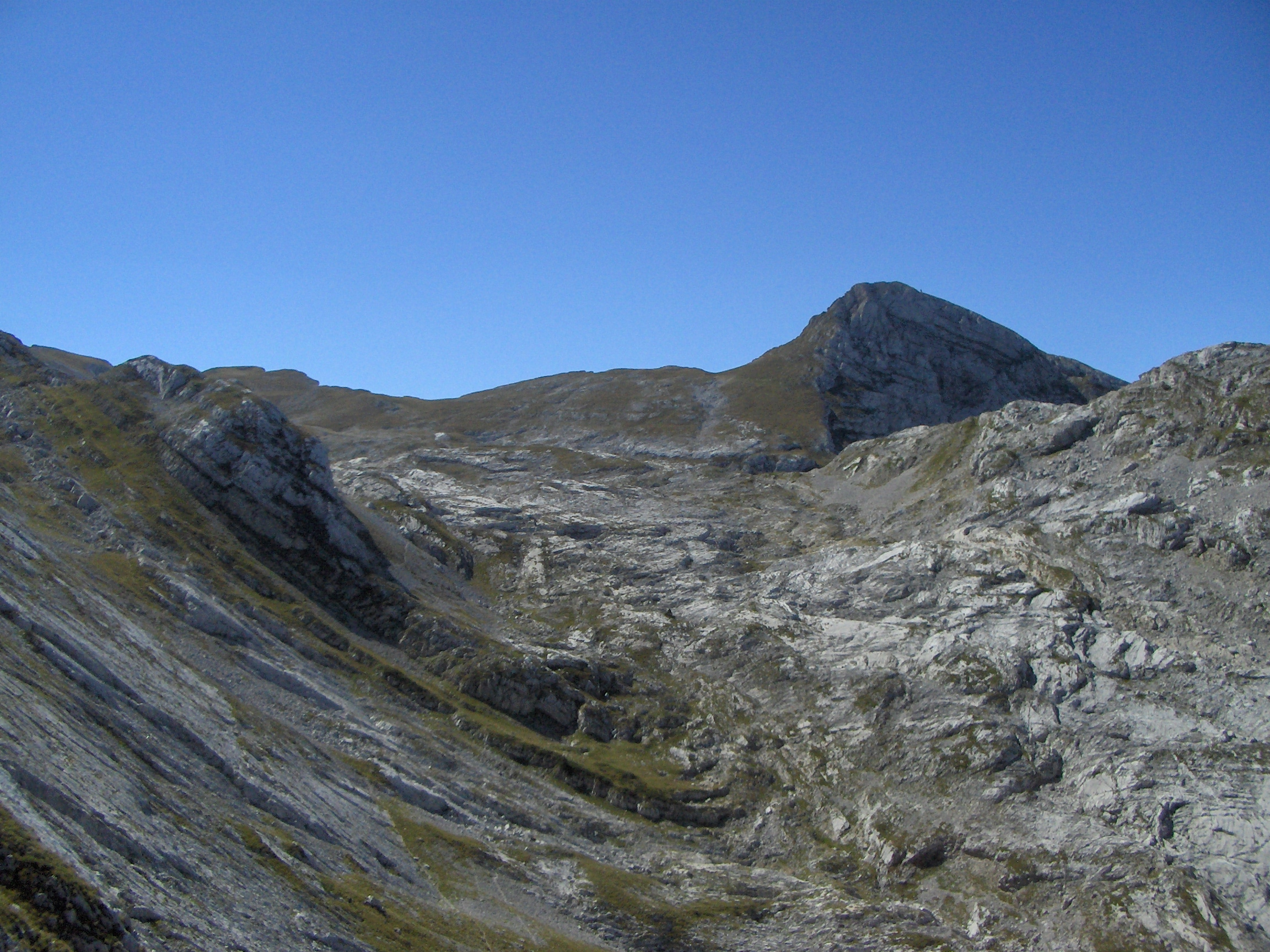
The vallon du Clot d'Aspres and la Grande Moucherolle

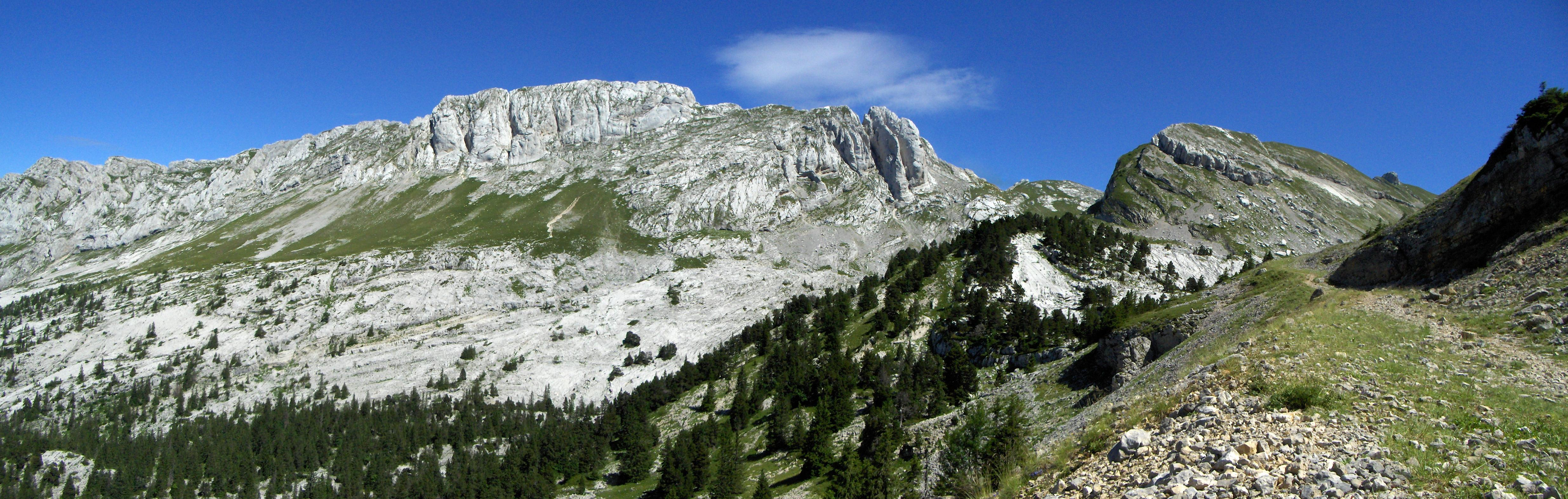
The vallon de la Fauge and the vallon du Clot d'Aspres

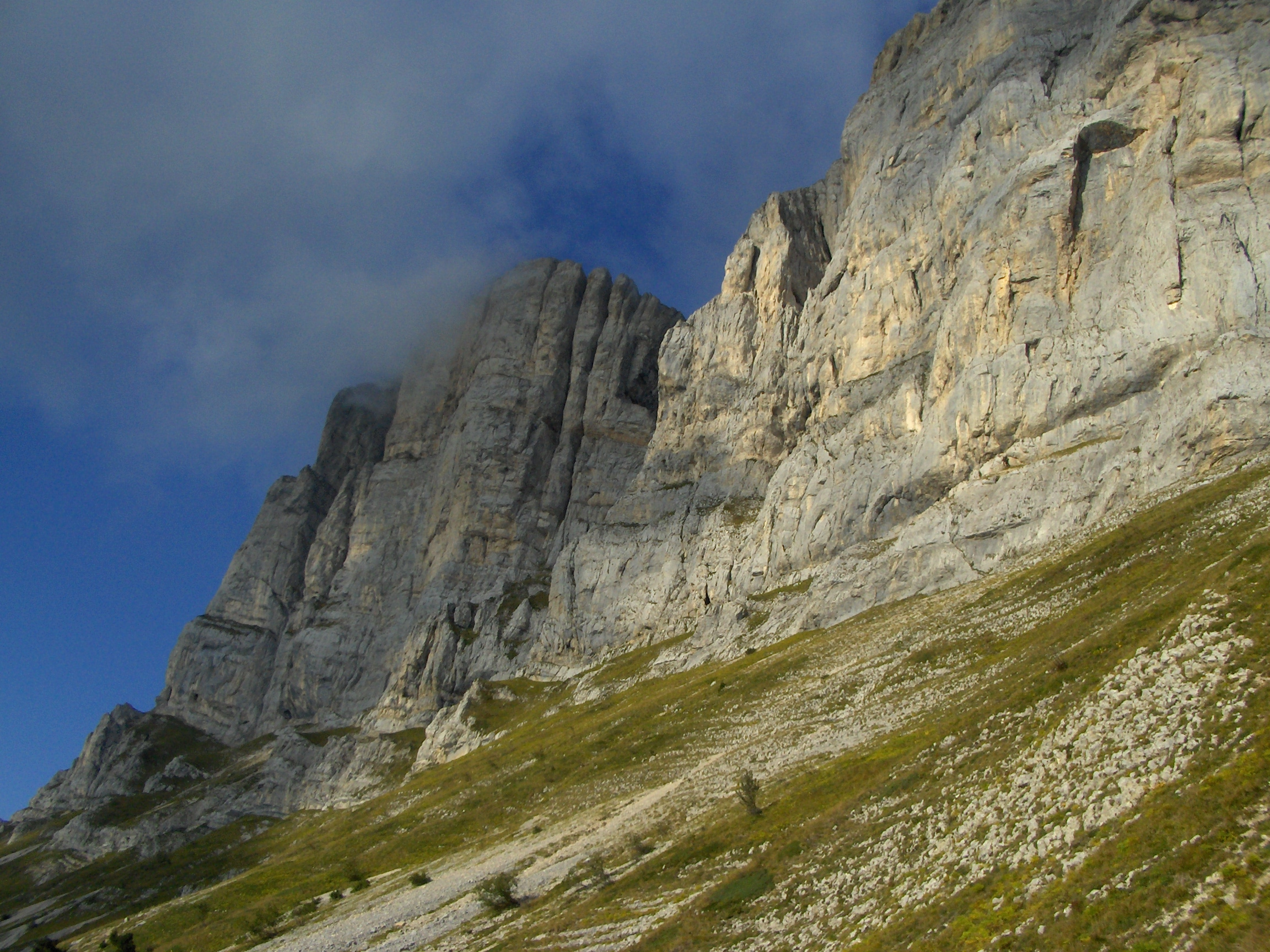
Cliffs of Deux Sœurs
