= Bournillon Cave =

Natural cave in France

- Grotte de Bournillon
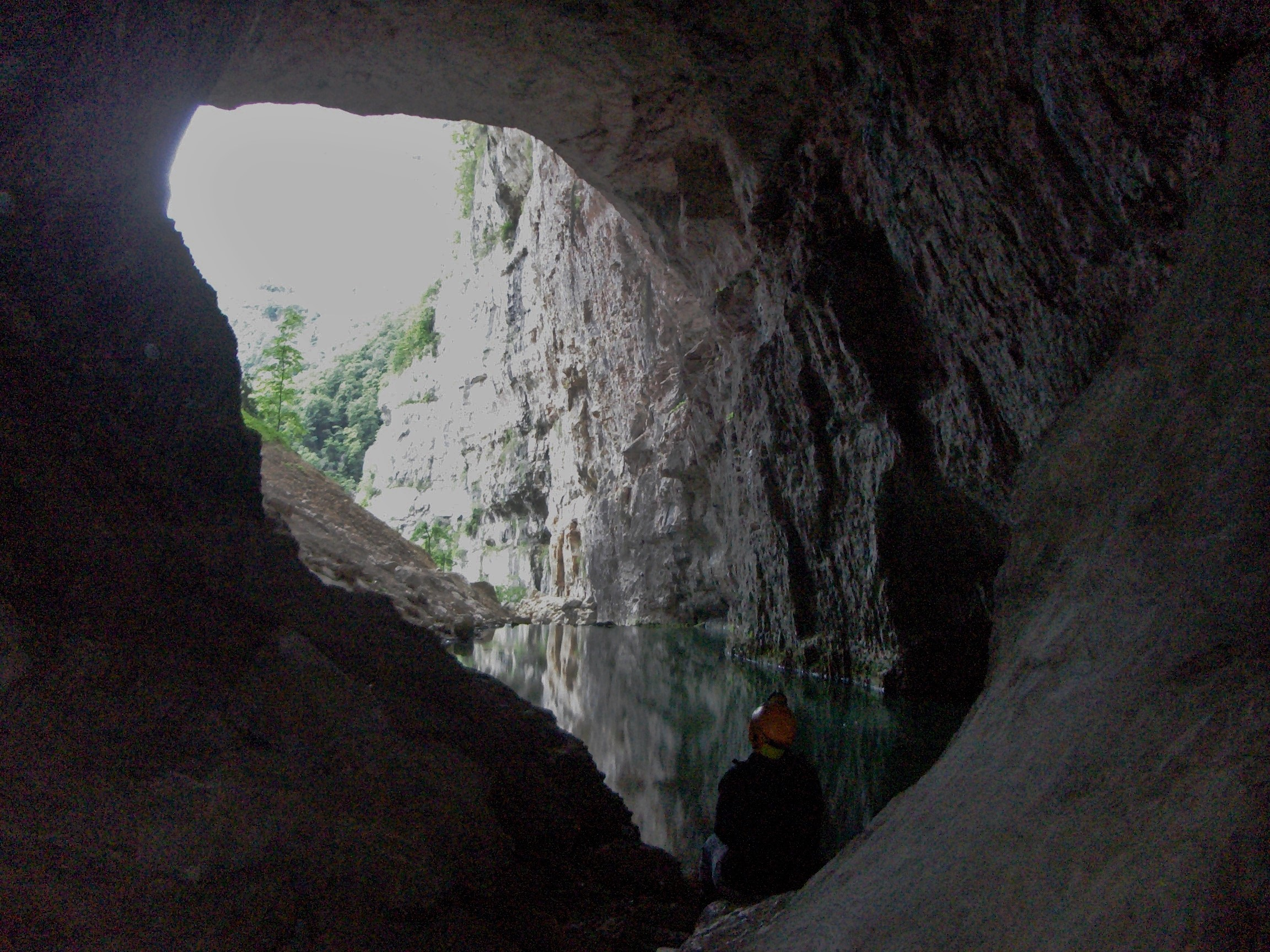
- Entrance of the Bournillon Cave, the highest in Europe.

- Location within France
- Location: Isère, France
- Coordinates: 45°03′16″N 5°25′57″E
- Length: 7,886 metres (25,873 ft)
- Elevation: 418 metres (1,371 ft)
- Geology: Limestone

The Bournillon Cave (French: grotte de Bournillon) is located in the commune of Châtelus in the Isère Department of France, in the Vercors Massif. Its entrance is 105 metres (344 ft) high, and 60 metres (200 ft) wide, and is the largest in Europe. It is one of the main karst springs of Vercors, with a maximum flow rate of 80 cubic metres (2,800 cu ft) per second, which feeds a hydroelectric plant.

== Description ==
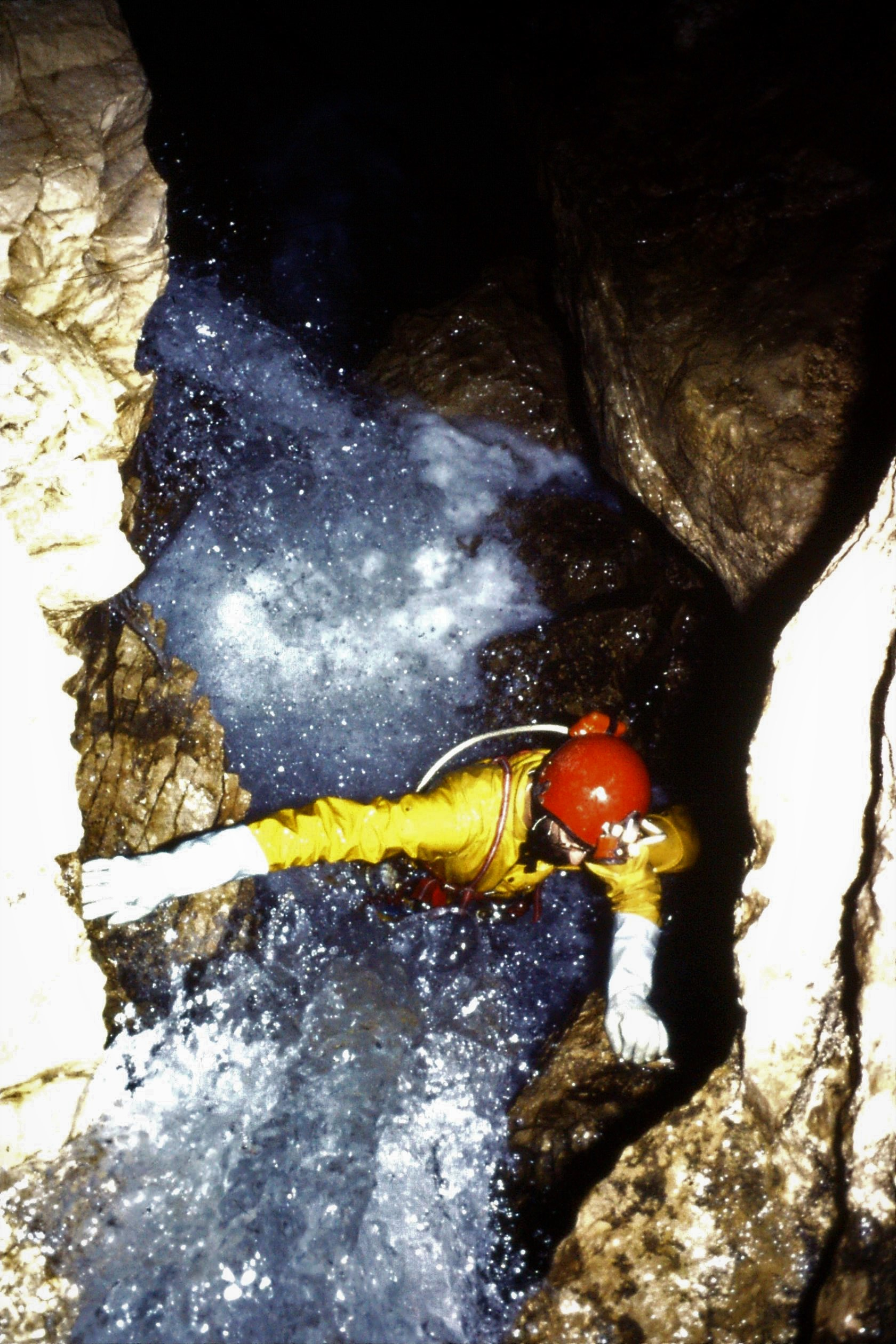
At the cave mouth with the stream in full flow (photo: Gilbert Bohec).

The main passage may be followed for over a kilometre to the Salle Terminale. Two short passages lead off from here, both terminating in sumps, where the passage disappears underwater. A passage in the west wall of the entrance porch joins the main passage via a ledge after some 600 metres.

After four or five months of drought the sump in the right-hand passage leading off from the Salle Terminale drains, allowing access to further passages upstream. This section is dangerous in the event of storms. The Salle des Centaures, a chamber 30×10 metres (98×33 ft), is followed by a bedding passage leading to another gallery: Minos Centre. The following Galerie des Champs Elyséens, some 10 metres (33 ft) wide, splits, one branch finishing at Siphon Alpha and the other at Siphon Beta. These siphons continue towards the south-by-southwest for 500 metres (1,600 ft) at a depth of 36 metres (118 ft) in Siphon Beta, and for 543 metres (1,781 ft) at a depth of 85 metres (279 ft) in Siphon Alpha).

== Exploration history ==
In 1897 a team led by French caver Oscar Decombaz (1866 - 1914) explored the grotto as far as the Metro Needle where the galley becomes a siphon. In 1942 André Bourgin and Roger Pénelon found the upper gallery and the lateral gallery. Attempts to dive at the Metro Needle siphon did not achieve significant upstream penetration. An exceptional drought in 1985 allowed Maurice and Franck Chiron to discover 1,600 metres (5,200 ft) of new galleries, terminating a point 95 metres (312 ft) higher than the cave entrance, at the two siphons Alpha and Beta. David Bianzani and other cave divers probed the siphons, but further upstream exploration remains.

== Hydrology ==
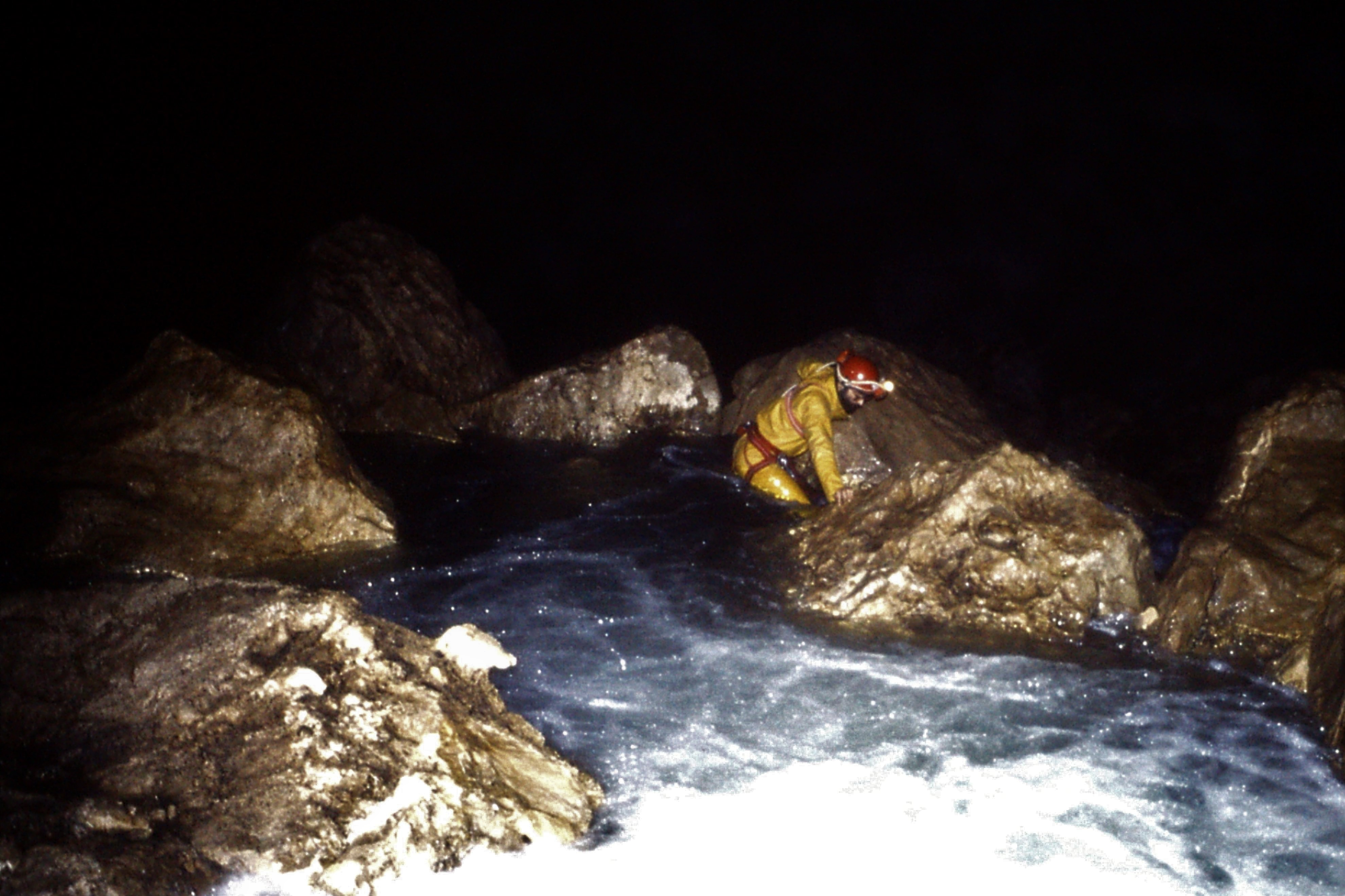
The stream flowing from the Bournillon cave in full flow.

Lower in the Bournillon Gorge is the Sources de Arbois, which is the normal resurgence for the catchment area, which constitutes much of southern Vercors: the high plateau of Vercors and the Vassieux High Plateaux. When the Sources de Arbois flow in excess of 3.5 cubic metres (120 cu ft) per second, the overflow goes into the Bournillon system. When the flow rate in the cave exceeds 40 cubic metres (1,400 cu ft) per second then another overflow starts at the Grotte de la Luire, some 18 kilometres (11 mi) due south in the Varnaison valley. The stream from the Bournillon flows into the Bourne, which is a tributary of the Isère river, and from thence to the Rhône.

== Geology ==
The cave developed at the base of the Urgonian limestone formation. Dating one of the stalagmites indicated that the speleothem had been formed more than 350,000 years ago. The formation of the cavity, 200 metres (660 ft) above the Bourne Gorge, dates to 3–4 million years before the present, to the Pliocene Epoch.
