= Col de Rousset =

Mountain pass in France

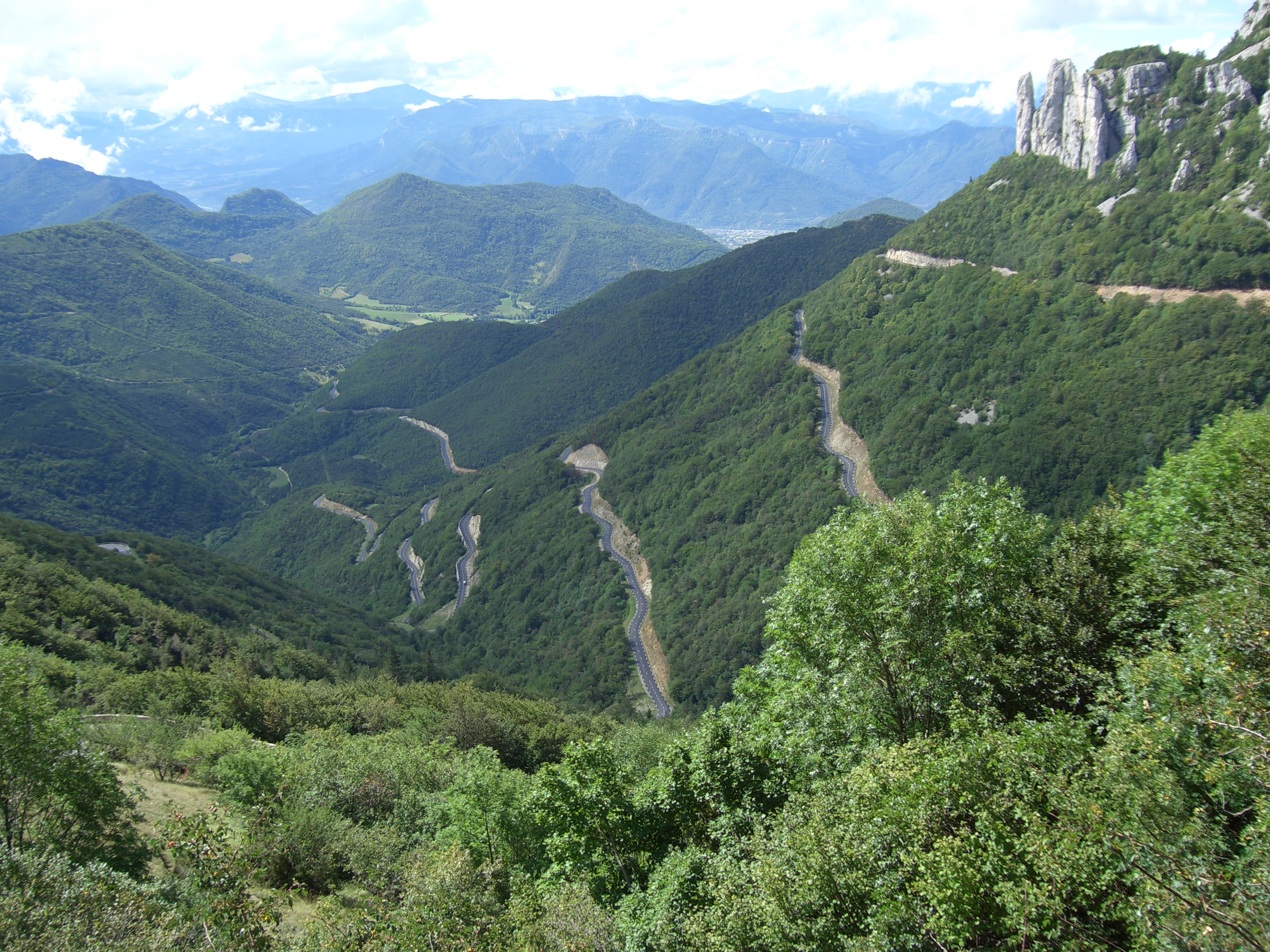

- Location within France
- Elevation: 1,254 m (4,114 ft)

Third Approach
- Location: Drôme, Auvergne-Rhône-Alpes, France
- Range: Vercors Massif
- Coordinates: 44°50′26.2″N 05°24′21.61″E

The Col de Rousset is a mountain pass located in the Vercors Regional Natural Park, Drôme, Auvergne-Rhône-Alpes, France, and it is a part of the Vercors Massif and has a height of 1,254 meters, the mountain pass is popular among cyclists and the area around it is popular for winter sports.

== Location ==
The mountain pass is situated in the arrondissement of Die and the mountain is 19 km away from the town with the same name. The Rousset Pass is one of the few crossing points, with the Col de la Bataille as an allowing access to the South-Vercors. It connects Die to the south with Vassieux-en-Vercors to the northwest through a tunnel at 1254 meters and drilled in 1979 and a length of 769 m. It replaces a previous work from 1866 and parallel to it. True neck, the top of the ridge overlooking the tunnel, is for its part to 1367 meters and is within walking distance. The hamlet of Rousset to which the collar belongs to the municipality of Saint-Agnan-en-Vercors, in the Drôme department.

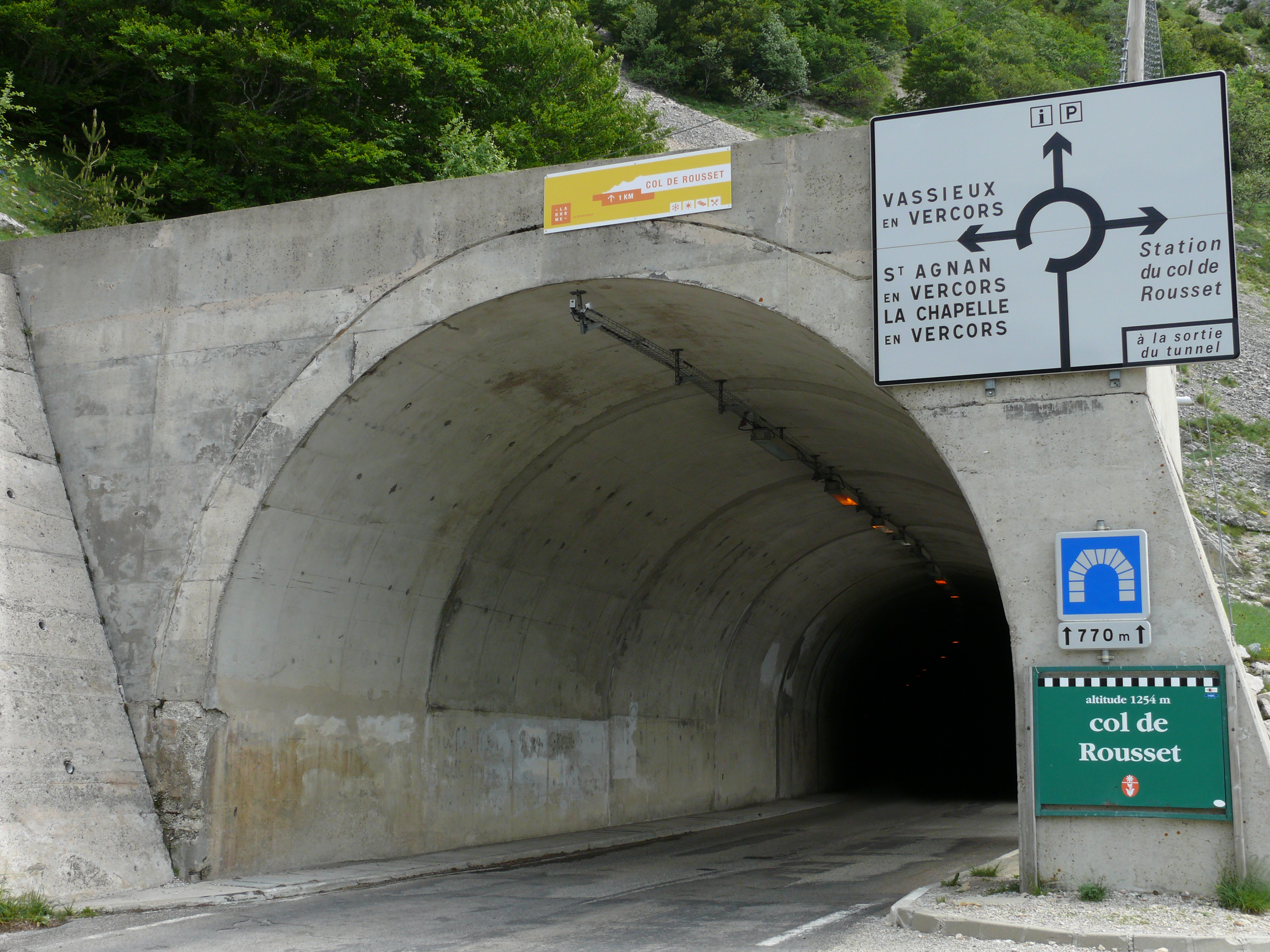
Tunnel of the Col de Rousset

== Station Col de Rousset ==
There is also an Alpine ski resort at with a funicular and six ski lifts which are serving thirty tracks offering all levels of difficulty. Nearby is also a snow stadium, the stadium Raphael Poiree, with tracks of Nordic skiing and dog sledding in the winter. The cervix is the start of the Great Crossing of Vercors (GTV), which leads to Villard-de-Lans, cross country skiing during the winter and mountain biking during the summer, through the high plateaus of Vercors.

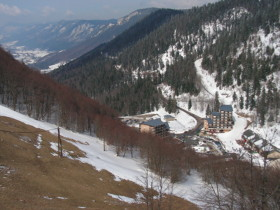
Col de Rousset during the winter

== Tour de France ==
The mountain pass was visited three times by the Tour de France in 1984, 1996 and 1998.

| Year | Stage | Category | Start | Finish | Leader at the summit |
|---|---|---|---|---|---|
| 1984 | 15 | 2 | Domaine du Rouret | Grenoble | Jean-René Bernaudeau (FRA) |
| 1996 | 11 | 2 | Gap | Valence | Laurent Brochard (FRA) |
| 1998 | 14 | 2 | Valréas | Grenoble | Stuart O'Grady (AUS) |
