= Château-Bernard =

- Commune
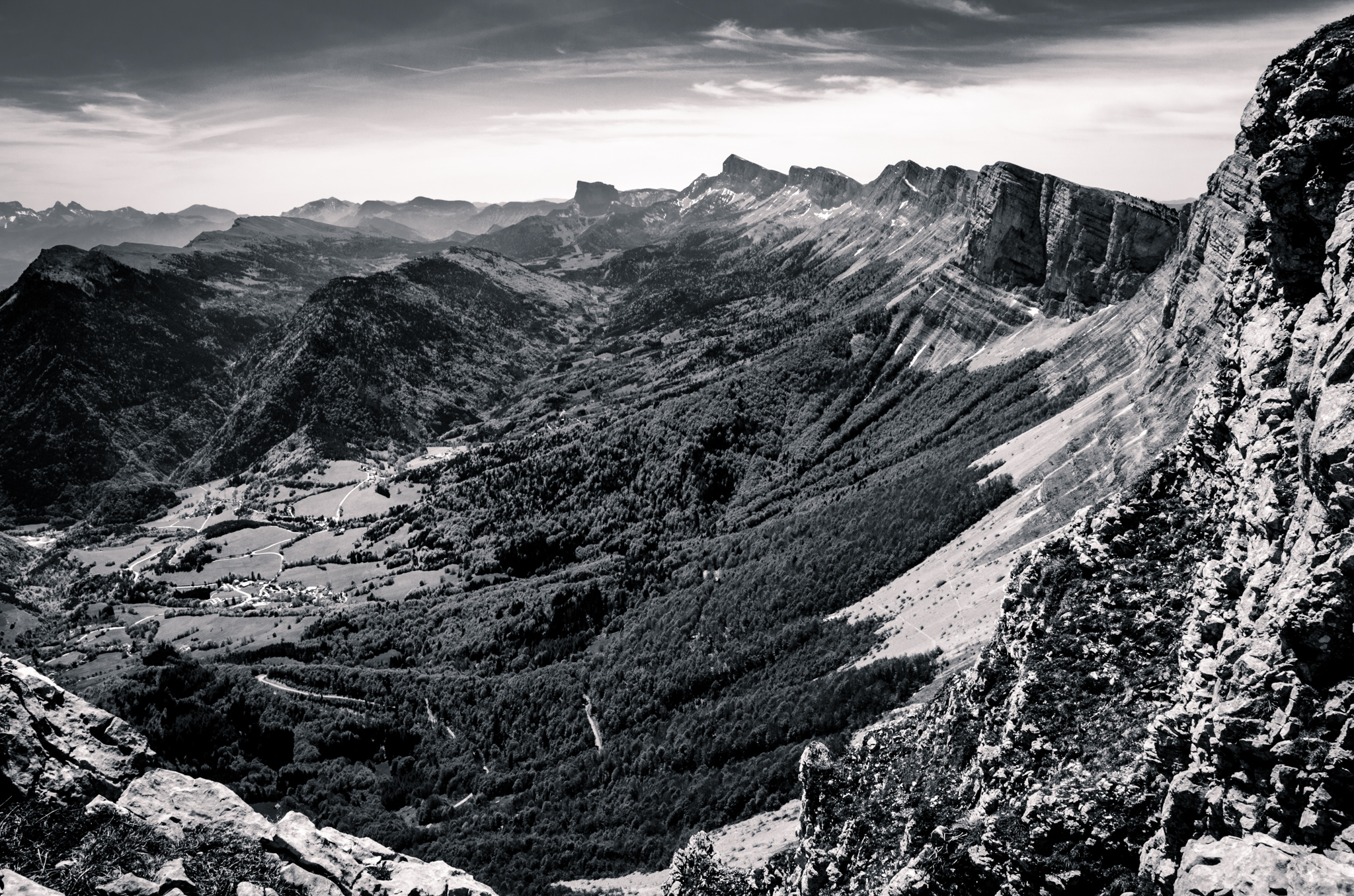
- A general view of Château-Bernard
- Location of Château-Bernard
- Location within France Location within Auvergne-Rhône-Alpes
- Coordinates: 44°58′33″N 5°34′37″E
- Country: France
- Region: Auvergne-Rhône-Alpes
- Department: Isère
- Arrondissement: Grenoble
- Canton: Matheysine-Trièves

Government
  - Mayor (2024–2026): Marc Rochas
- Area^{1}: 18 km^{2} (6.9 sq mi)
- Elevation: 855 m (2,805 ft)
- Highest elevation: 2,286 m (7,500 ft)
- Lowest elevation: 754 m (2,474 ft)
- Population (2023): 295
  - Density: 16/km^{2} (42/sq mi)
- Time zone: UTC+01:00 (CET)
  - Summer (DST): UTC+02:00 (CEST)
- INSEE/Postal code: 38090 /38650
- ^{1} French Land Register data, which excludes lakes, ponds, glaciers > 1 km^{2} (0.386 sq mi or 247 acres) and river estuaries.

Château-Bernard (French pronunciation: [ʃɑto bɛʁnaʁ]) is a commune in the Isère department in southeastern France.

== Population ==
Historical population
Year	Pop.	±% p.a.
1968	107	—
1975	147	+4.64%
1982	131	−1.63%
1990	134	+0.28%
1999	168	+2.54%
2007	279	+6.55%
2012	289	+0.71%
2017	267	−1.57%
2023	295	+1.68%
Source: INSEE

== See also ==
- Communes of the Isère department
- Parc naturel régional du Vercors
