= La Chapelle-en-Vercors =

- Commune
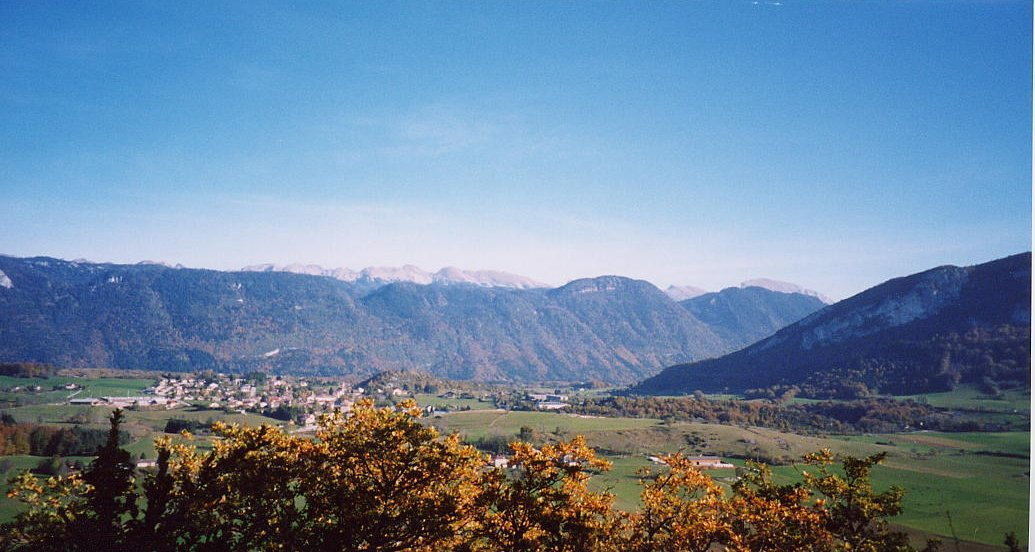
- A general view of La Chapelle-en-Vercors

- Coat of arms
- Location of La Chapelle-en-Vercors
- Location within France Location within Auvergne-Rhône-Alpes
- Coordinates: 44°58′07″N 5°25′01″E
- Country: France
- Region: Auvergne-Rhône-Alpes
- Department: Drôme
- Arrondissement: Die
- Canton: Vercors-Monts du Matin

Government
  - Mayor (2020–2026): Jean-Michel Tarin
- Area^{1}: 45.27 km^{2} (17.48 sq mi)
- Highest elevation: 1,524 m (5,000 ft)
- Lowest elevation: 600 m (2,000 ft)
- Population (2023): 797
  - Density: 17.6/km^{2} (45.6/sq mi)
- Time zone: UTC+01:00 (CET)
  - Summer (DST): UTC+02:00 (CEST)
- INSEE/Postal code: 26074 /26420
- ^{1} French Land Register data, which excludes lakes, ponds, glaciers > 1 km^{2} (0.386 sq mi or 247 acres) and river estuaries.

La Chapelle-en-Vercors (French pronunciation: [la ʃapɛl ɑ̃ vɛʁkɔʁ]; Occitan: Chapèla de Vercòrs) is a commune in the Drôme department in southeastern France.

== Population ==
Historical population
Year	Pop.	±% p.a.
1968	722	—
1975	675	−0.96%
1982	653	−0.47%
1990	628	−0.49%
1999	662	+0.59%
2007	674	+0.22%
2012	677	+0.09%
2017	713	+1.04%
2023	797	+1.87%
Source: INSEE

== See also ==
- Communes of the Drôme department
- Parc naturel régional du Vercors
