= Gresse-en-Vercors =

- Commune
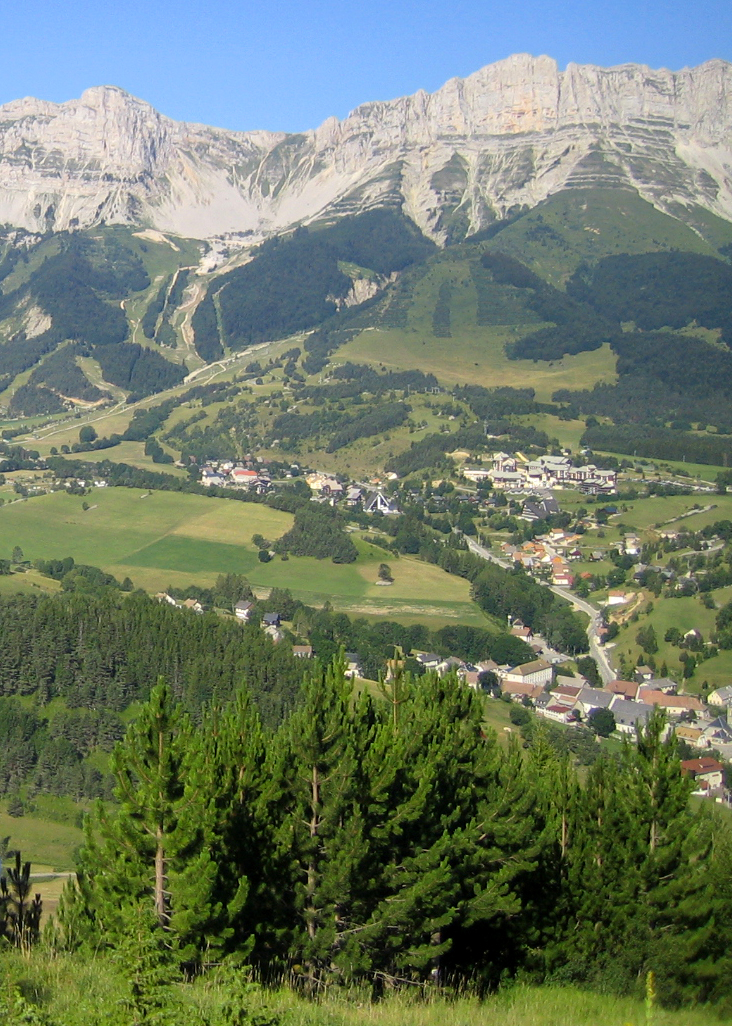
- A general view of Gresse-en-Vercors
- Location of Gresse-en-Vercors
- Location within France Location within Auvergne-Rhône-Alpes
- Coordinates: 44°54′11″N 5°34′03″E
- Country: France
- Region: Auvergne-Rhône-Alpes
- Department: Isère
- Arrondissement: Grenoble
- Canton: Matheysine-Trièves

Government
  - Mayor (2020–2026): Jean-Marc Bellot
- Area^{1}: 81 km^{2} (31 sq mi)
- Elevation: 1,205 m (3,953 ft)
- Highest elevation: 2,341 m (7,680 ft)
- Lowest elevation: 960 m (3,150 ft)
- Population (2023): 351
  - Density: 4.3/km^{2} (11/sq mi)
- Time zone: UTC+01:00 (CET)
  - Summer (DST): UTC+02:00 (CEST)
- INSEE/Postal code: 38186 /38650
- ^{1} French Land Register data, which excludes lakes, ponds, glaciers > 1 km^{2} (0.386 sq mi or 247 acres) and river estuaries.

Gresse-en-Vercors (French pronunciation: [ɡʁɛs ɑ̃ vɛʁkɔʁ], literally Gresse in Vercors; Occitan: Grèssa) is a commune in the Isère department in southeastern France.

== Population ==
Historical population
Year	Pop.	±% p.a.
1968	175	—
1975	165	−0.84%
1982	203	+3.01%
1990	265	+3.39%
1999	299	+1.35%
2007	370	+2.70%
2012	391	+1.11%
2017	395	+0.20%
2023	351	−1.95%
Source: INSEE

== Twin towns ==
Gresse-en-Vercors is twinned with:

- Calvanico, Italy, since 2003

== See also ==
- Communes of the Isère department
- Vercors Regional Natural Park
