= Urgonian Limestone =

Geological formation

- Stratigraphic range: Cretaceous
- Type: Formation

Lithology
- Primary: Limestone

Location
- Country: France

The Urgonian Limestone is a geologic formation in France. It preserves fossils dating back to the Cretaceous period. Some parts of the limestone have undergone metamorphism to produce ductile folds next to faults.

== See also ==
- List of fossiliferous stratigraphic units in France
