= Vichy French Military Division order of battle =

Order of Battle of a typical Vichy French Military Division

Military Division
- Division Militaire; DM
- Active: 1940-42
- Country: Vichy France
- Branch: Armistice Army
- Type: Infantry
- Size: Division
- Engagements: World War II

The Military Division (French: Division Militaire, abbreviated to DM) was a Vichy French infantry formation in 1940-1942, during World War II. The divisions were numbered according to the military regions. The Vichy French Military Division had a near-identical organisation as the French Infantry Divisions of 1939-1940, but with the restrictions of the Armistice of 22 June 1940 imposed them. The whole Army of Vichy France, except for the Garde, was demobilized on 27 November 1942 after Case Anton.

== Organisation ==
The table below shows the order of battle that a Military Division aspired to. In addition, each Military Division had a Bureau of Anti-National Activities, which had the purpose of countering politically subversive actions, especially those by Communists, but also those of the supporters of Charles de Gaulle.

Unit
Division headquarters
3x Infantry regiments (each of an identical composition) (or 3x Demi-brigades of Chasseurs à Pied, each with 3 battalions)
I battalion	4 mixed rifle and MG companies, collectively including: (Note: Theoretically, there would be 3x 50mm 1937-pattern grenade launcher and 6x MAS-38 and Thompson submachine guns per platoon.): 26x FM 24/29 light machine gun; 16x Hotchkiss Mle 1914 machine gun; 36x Lance Grenades de 50 mm modèle 37/VB rifle grenade; 3x 60mm mortars; 3x 81mm mortars
II battalion	4 mixed rifle and MG companies (as above)
III battalion	4 mixed rifle and MG companies (as above)
Cavalry regiment (either Cuirassier/Dragoon or Chasseur/Hussar)
A single Cuirassier or Dragoon regiment (divided into reconnaissance groups): 2 mounted squadrons; 3 cyclist squadrons (15x Hotchkiss MGs, 10x 81mm mortars); 1 armoured car squadron (8x Panhard AMD) (Note: The Panhard's anti-tank gun was replaced with a second 7.5mm machine gun.)	A single Chasseurs à cheval or Hussar regiment: 4 mounted sabre squadrons; 1 heavy weapons squadron (12x Hotchkiss MGs, 4x 81mm mortars)
Artillery regiment
I group	3 batteries (Note: Each battery had four Canon de 75 modèle 1897.) (Note: One battery was tractor-drawn, the other two were horse-drawn.)
II group	3 batteries
III group	4 batteries
Engineer battalion
2 companies; a half-company bridging train
Signals group, (Note: The term 'group' is used for support units, though equivalent to that of a company.) also known as a battalion
Transport group, also known as company
Guard regiment

Moreover, there existed four cavalry regiments of the general reserve.

== Equipment ==
This Armistice banned anti-tank and gas protection equipment, while minimizing mechanization. However, the reduction of the French army meant that its remains could be entirely equipped with the newest and best equipment available, e.g. MAS-36 rifle, MAS-38 and Thompson submachine guns. The previously used VB rifle grenade was over time replaced with the Lance Grenades de 50 mm modèle 37. Artillery was only allowed to have 75mm calibre guns.

== Military Divisions ==
Table of Military Divisions within the Vichy Army and their main component units
Military divisions	Location of divisional headquarters	Infantry units	Cavalry regiment	Artillery regiment
7th Military Division	Bourg-en-Bresse	65th Infantry Regiment; 151st Infantry Regiment; 4e Chasseurs à Pied Demi-brigade: 1st Chasseurs à Pied Battalion; 2nd Chasseurs à Pied Battalion; 10th Chasseurs à Pied Battalion	5th Dragoon Regiment	61st Artillery Regiment
9th Military Division	Châteauroux	1st Infantry Regiment; 27th Infantry Regiment; 32th Infantry Regiment	8th Cuirassier Regiment	72nd Artillery Regiment
12th Military Division	Limoges	26th Infantry Regiment; 41st Infantry Regiment; 1st Chasseurs à Pied Demi-brigade: 8th Chasseurs à Pied Battalion; 16th Chasseurs à Pied Battalion; 30th Chasseurs à Pied Battalion	6th Cuirassier Regiment	35th Artillery Regiment
13th Military Division	Clermont-Ferrand	5th Infantry Regiment; 92nd Infantry Regiment; 152nd Infantry Regiment	8th Dragoon Regiment	4th Artillery Regiment
14th Military Division	Lyon	153rd Infantry Regiment; 159th Infantry Regiment; 3rd Chasseurs Alpins Demi-brigade: 6th Chasseurs Alpins Battalion; 13th Chasseurs Alpins Battalion; 27th Chasseurs Alpins Battalion	11th Cuirassier Regiment	2nd Artillery Regiment
15th Military Division	Marseille	43rd Alpine Infantry Regiment; 21st Colonial Infantry Regiment; 173rd Autonomous Battalion; 2nd Chasseurs Alpins Demi-brigade: 20th Chasseurs Alpins Battalion; 24th Chasseurs Alpins Battalion; 25th Chasseurs Alpins Battalion	12th Cuirassier Regiment	10th Colonial Artillery Regiment
16th Military Division	Montpellier	8th Infantry Regiment; 51st Infantry Regiment; 2nd Colonial Infantry Regiment	3rd Dragoon Regiment	15th Artillery Regiment
17th Military Division	Toulouse	18th Infantry Regiment; 23rd Infantry Regiment; 150th Infantry Regiment	2nd Dragoon Regiment	24th Artillery Regiment

== Sources ==
- Sereau, Raymond (1961). L'armée de l'armistice (1940-1942) (in French). Nouvelles Editions Latines.
- Vauvillier, François; Sumner, Ian (1998). The French Army 1939-45. Men-at-Arms. Vol. I. United Kingdom: Osprey Publishing. ISBN 9781855326668.
