= France during World War II =

- 3 September 1939 – 2 September 1945
Interwar France	Trente Glorieuses
- President(s): Albert Lebrun; Philippe Pétain (Chief of State); Charles de Gaulle
- Prime Minister(s): Édouard Daladier; Paul Reynaud; Philippe Pétain; Pierre Laval; Pierre-Étienne Flandin; François Darlan; Charles de Gaulle

France was one of the largest military powers to come under occupation as part of the Western Front in World War II. The Western Front was a military theatre of World War II encompassing Denmark, Norway, Luxembourg, Belgium, the Netherlands, the United Kingdom, France, Italy, and Germany. The Western Front was marked by two phases of large-scale combat operations.

The first phase saw the capitulation of the Netherlands, Belgium, and France during May and June 1940 after their defeat in the Low Countries and the northern half of France, and continued into an air war between Germany and Britain that climaxed with the Battle of Britain.

After capitulation, France was governed as Vichy France headed by Marshal Philippe Pétain. From 1940 to 1942, while the Vichy regime was the nominal government of all of France except for Alsace-Lorraine, the Germans and Italians militarily occupied northern and south-eastern France. France was not liberated until 1944, when the allied invasion restored the French Government.

== Topics ==
The following are articles about the topic of France during World War II:

- Maginot Line and Alpine Line of fortifications and defences along the borders with Germany and Italy
- French declaration of war on Germany—17:00 on 3 September 1939.
- Phoney War, or drôle de guerre ("strange war"), the name given to the period of time in Western Europe from September 1939 to April 1940 when, after the blitzkrieg attack on Poland in September 1939, there was almost no fighting, and no bombs were dropped.
  - Maxime Weygand, commander-in-chief; little military activity between the defeat of Poland in October 1939 and April 1940.
  - Anglo-French Supreme War Council set up to organize a joint strategy against Germany.
- The Battle of France in May and June 1940, in which the German victory led to the fall of the French Third Republic.

=== Vichy France ===
- Vichy France, the German client state established in June 1940 under in the non-occupied Zone libre, officially neutral and independent until invaded by the Axis in November 1942.
  - Marshal Philippe Pétain, Vichy's main leader
  - Pierre Laval, head of government 1942–1944
  - Vichy French Army
  - Vichy French Navy
  - Vichy French Air Force
  - Milice
    - Franc-Garde
    - Groupe mobile de réserve
  - Guard (Vichy France)
  - Scuttling of the French fleet in Toulon.
  - Service du travail obligatoire - the provision of French citizens as forced labour in Germany.
- Axis occupation of France:
  - German occupation of France during World War II - 1940–1944 in the northern zones, and 1942–1944 in the southern zone.
    - The Holocaust in France.
  - Italian occupation of France during World War II - limited to border areas 1940–1942, almost all Rhône left-bank territory 1942-1943.

== Free France ==
- Charles de Gaulle, the main leader.
- Free France (La France Libre), the provisional government in London who controlled unoccupied and liberated territories, and the forces under its control (Forces françaises libres or FFL), fighting on the Allies' side after the Appeal of 18 June of its leader, General de Gaulle.
  - French Liberation Army (Armée française de la Libération) formed on 1 August 1943 by the merger of the FFL and all other Free French units, principally the Army of Africa.
  - French Forces of the Interior (Forces françaises de l'intérieur) elements of the Resistance loyal to London and under its operational military command.
  - Free French Air Force.
  - Free French Naval Forces.
  - French Resistance and the National Council of the Resistance which coordinated the various groups that made up the resistance.
  - Japanese and Thai occupation of French Indochina - beginning with the Japanese invasion in September 1940 and with the Franco-Thai War which started in October 1940.
  - Rallying of New Caledonia to Free France
- Liberation of France
  - Operation Overlord - the invasion of northern France by the western Allies in June 1944.
  - Operation Dragoon - the invasion of southern France by the western Allies in August 1944.
  - Liberation of Paris - the freeing of the French capital in August 1944.
- Allied advance from Paris to the Rhine - advance (as the right flank of the western front) into Alsace-Lorraine in 1944.
- Western Allied invasion of Germany - invasion (as the right flank of the western front) of Baden-Württemberg in 1945.
