= Agnicourt-et-Séchelles =

- Commune
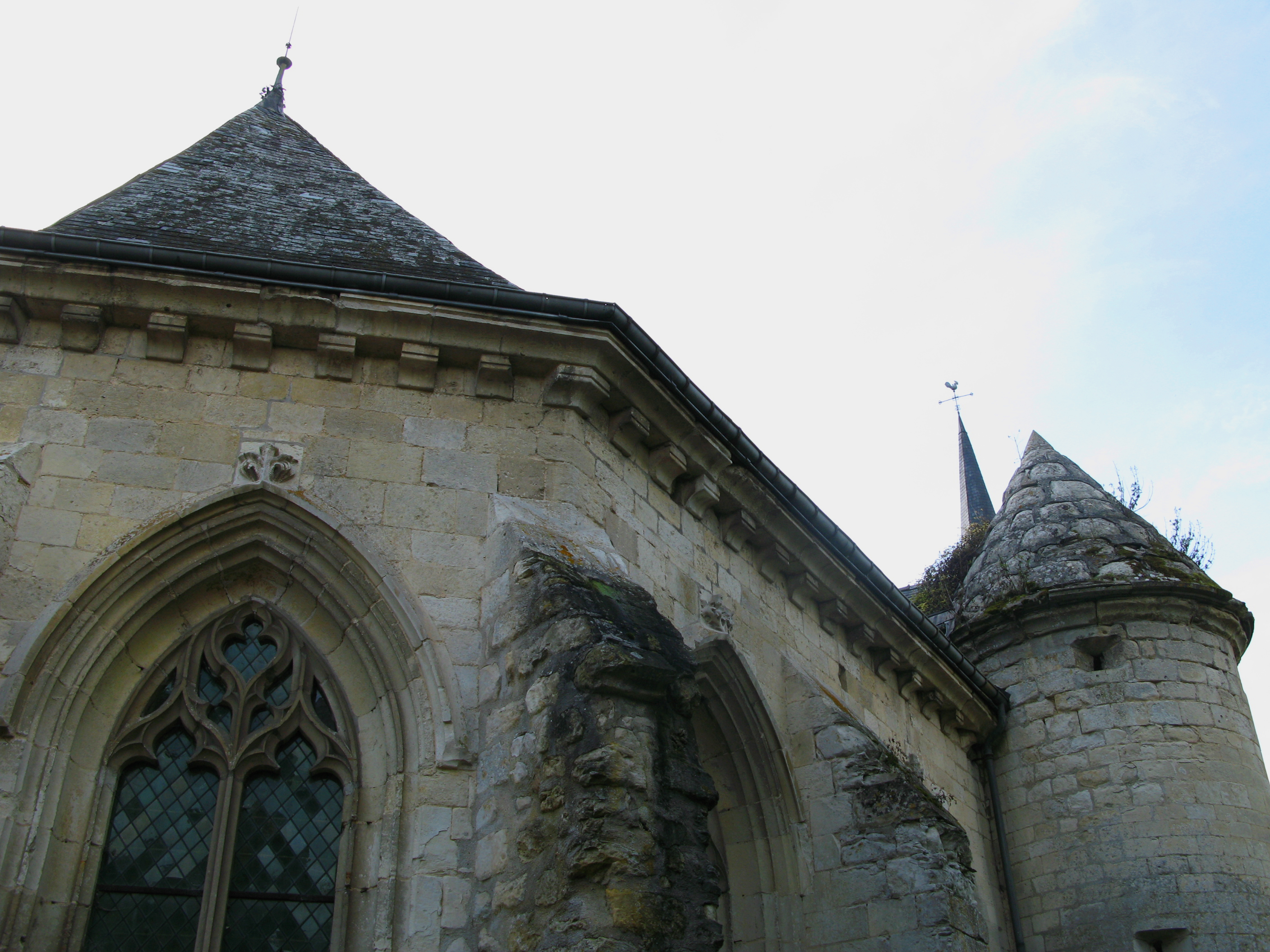
- Location of Agnicourt-et-Séchelles
- Location within France Location within Hauts-de-France
- Coordinates: 49°43′02″N 3°57′15″E
- Country: France
- Region: Hauts-de-France
- Department: Aisne
- Arrondissement: Laon
- Canton: Marle
- Intercommunality: Pays de la Serre

Government
  - Mayor (2026–32): Benjamin Nattier
- Area^{1}: 10.79 km^{2} (4.17 sq mi)
- Elevation: 127 m (417 ft)
- Highest elevation: 175 m (574 ft)
- Lowest elevation: 96 m (315 ft)
- Population (2023): 189
  - Density: 17.5/km^{2} (45.4/sq mi)
- Time zone: UTC+01:00 (CET)
  - Summer (DST): UTC+02:00 (CEST)
- INSEE/Postal code: 02004 /02340
- ^{1} French Land Register data, which excludes lakes, ponds, glaciers > 1 km^{2} (0.386 sq mi or 247 acres) and river estuaries.

Agnicourt-et-Séchelles (French pronunciation: [aɲikuʁ e seʃɛl]; Picard: Nicourt-et-Séchelle) is a commune in the department of Aisne in the Hauts-de-France region of northern France.

== Geography ==
Agnicourt-et-Séchelles is located some 60 km south-east of Saint-Quentin and 20 km south by south-east of Vervins. It consists of two parcels of land joined by a narrow neck with both portions straddling road D58 between Tavaux-et-Pontséricourt in the west and Chaourse in the east. The southern portion of the commune is traversed by the D946 road from Marle in the west to Montcornet in the south-east almost parallel to the D58. Road D59 links the two roads in the commune and also to the village. The hamlet of Moranzy is at the intersection of Highway D58 and D59 and the hamlet of Séchelles lies in the eastern portion of the commune on Highway D58. The rest of the commune is entirely farmland.

== Administration ==
Mayors of Agnicourt-et-Séchelles

From	To	Name	Party
2001	2014	Patrice Leturque	DVG
2014	2020	Jacques Blanche	
2020	2026	Patrice Leturque	DVG
2026	incumbent	Benjamin Nattier	

== Population ==
Historical population

Year	Pop.	±% p.a.
1793	403	—
1821	617	+1.53%
1846	665	+0.30%
1872	605	−0.36%
1901	450	−1.02%
1926	393	−0.54%
1946	350	−0.58%
1962	294	−1.08%
1968	248	−2.80%

Year	Pop.	±% p.a.
1975	238	−0.59%
1982	224	−0.86%
1990	209	−0.86%
1999	211	+0.11%
2007	186	−1.56%
2012	202	+1.66%
2017	177	−2.61%
2023	189	+1.10%

Source: EHESS and INSEE

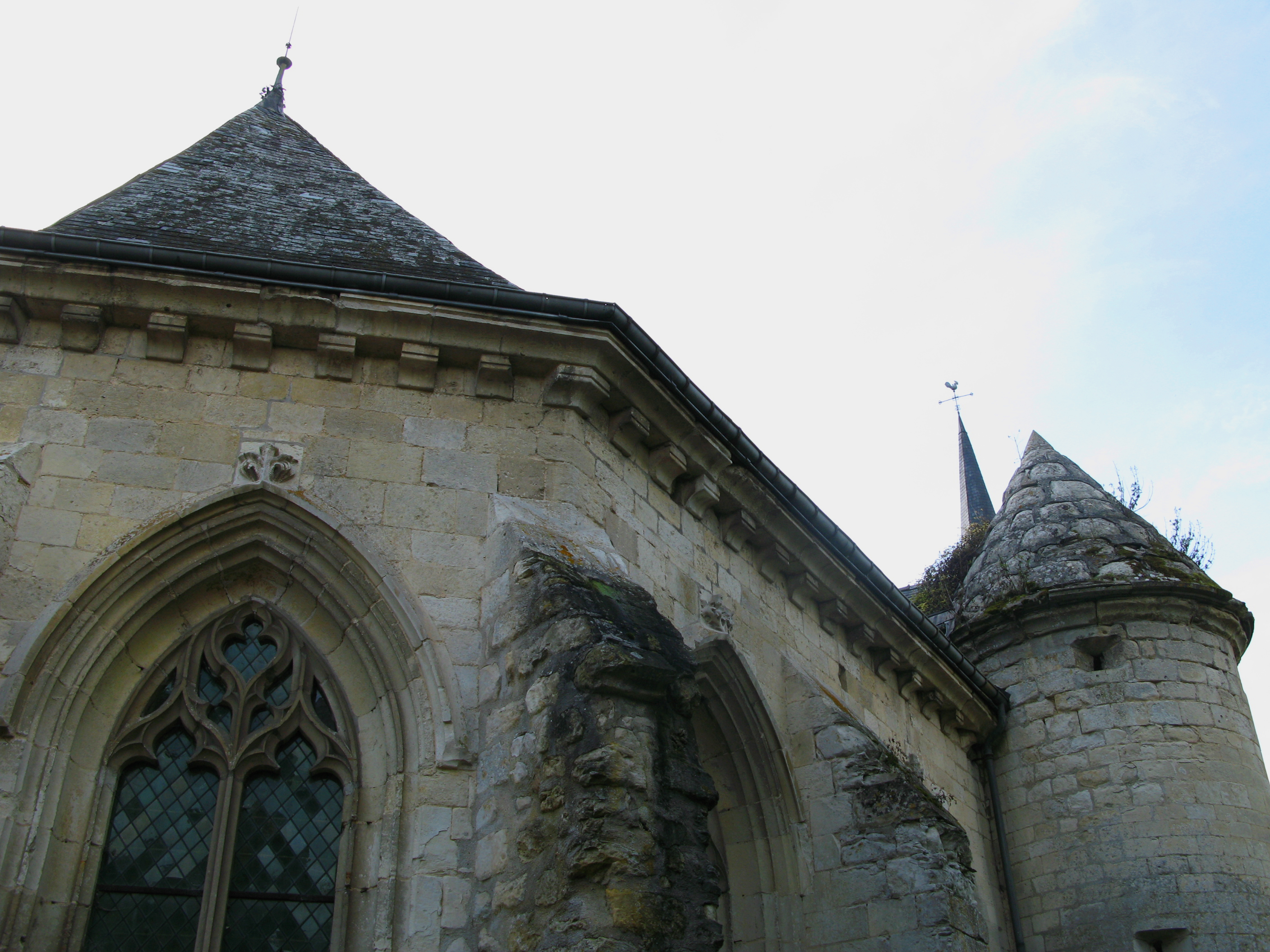
North side of the choir of Agnicourt church. The tower is covered with stone and not slate!

== Sites and monuments ==
- Church of Saint-Médard at Agnicourt (12th century)

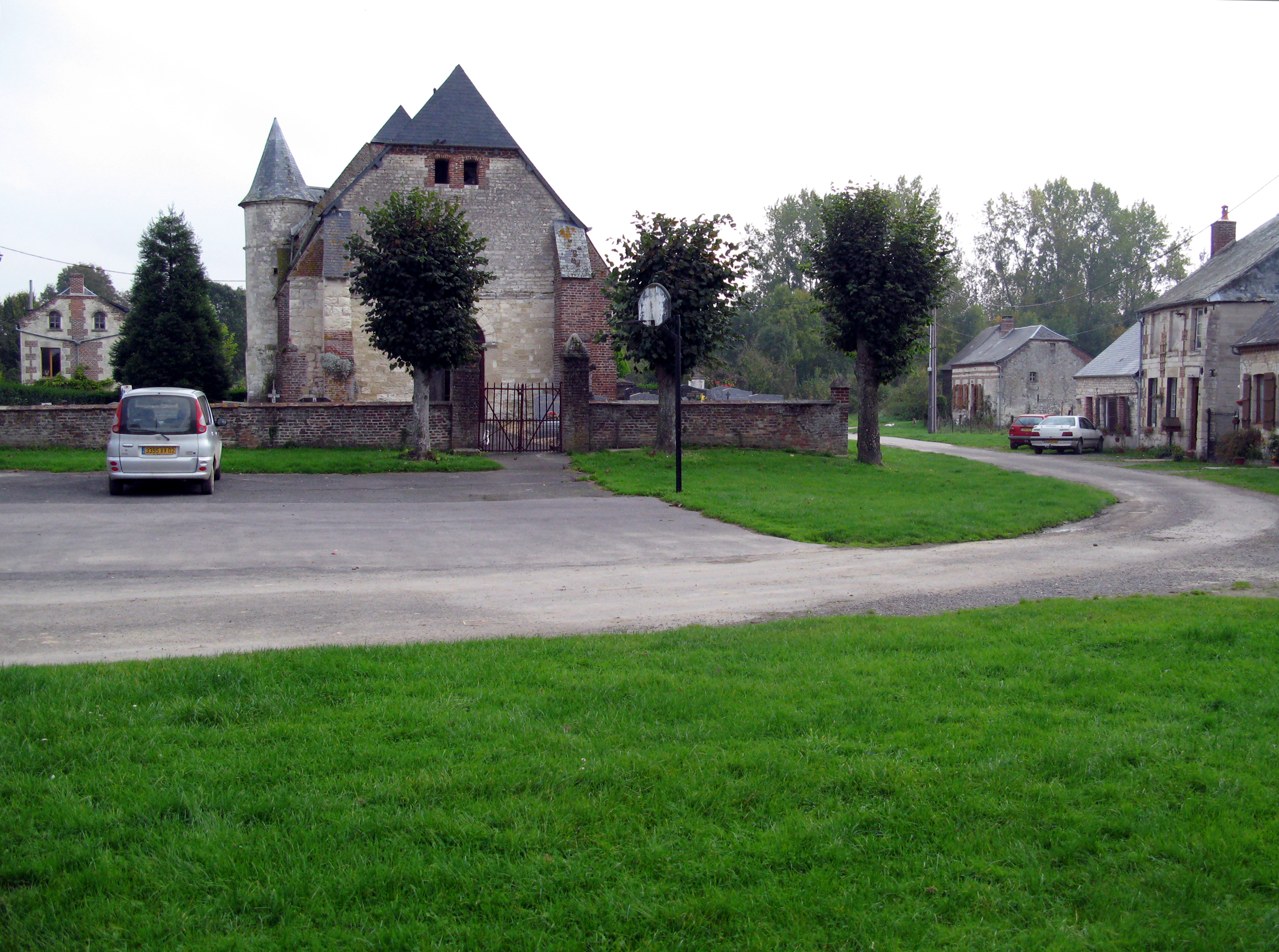
Chapel of Saint Agapit at Séchelles

- Chapel of Saint Agapit at Séchelles. In Séchelles, unlike most other villages in the area, the church does not overlook the area around it as space for housing was at a premium. The topology is different (flat and less rugged) so the mode of defence of the immediate vicinity of the building was different.

== See also ==
- Communes of the Aisne department

=== External links ===
- Agnicourt-et-Séchelles on Géoportail, National Geographic Institute (IGN) website (in French)
- Agnicourt and Sechelles on the 1750 Cassini Map
