= Tom Morel =

French military officer and Resistance fighter (1915–1944)

Théodose Morel
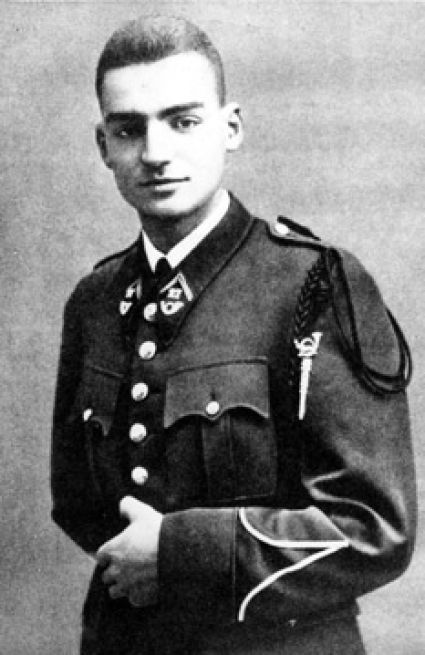
- Born: August 1, 1915; Lyon, France
- Died: March 10, 1944 (aged 28); Entremont, Haute-Savoie, France
- Military career
- Allegiance: France; French Resistance
- Branch: Chasseurs alpins
- Rank: Lieutenant
- Conflicts: World War II: Maquis des Glières
- Awards: Légion d'honneur Compagnon de la Libération; Croix de Guerre 1939–1945

Théodose "Tom" Morel (French pronunciation: [teɔdoz tɔm mɔʁɛl]; 1 August 1915 – 10 March 1944) was a career military officer and French Resistance fighter. A student, then instructor, at the Saint-Cyr military academy, he fought for the French Army against the Italians in the Alps. After the Fall of France, he led the Maquis des Glières, organizing attacks and parachute drops, and was the recipient of multiple military awards including the Croix de Guerre. He was killed in action at the end of a successful commando raid. He is memorialized at Saint-Cyr and by the French scouting movement.

== Youth and military career ==
Morel was born into a family of the Lyon bourgeoisie. His father was the son of a Lyon silk industrialist and his mother was from a family of Savoie jurists and soldiers. He was well schooled by the Lyon Jesuits where he was a Scout de France and patrol leader (1st Lyon, externat St Joseph), and moved towards a military career. At the Versailles private school of Sainte-Geneviève took the trial for the Saint-Cyr military academy, in which he enrolled in 1935 (promotion 1935-1937 Maréchal Lyautey). On finishing in 1935 he was appointed sub-lieutenant, and chose to be assigned to the 27th battalion de chasseurs alpins of Annecy. He then took high-altitude training at Chamonix and became leader of the section d'éclaireurs skieurs (SES), which he turned into a first-class fighting force. In November 1938, he married a woman from Annecy, Marie-Germaine Lamy.

In May 1939, the 27th BCA was stationed on the Italian border, with Morel's SES just above Val d'Isère. In September 1939, while his battalion left for the Eastern front, the section commanded by Morel (who had been promoted to lieutenant) remained guarding the Italian border. After the Italians entered the war on 12 June 1940, he distinguished himself in the battle of the Alps, decisively exploiting the success of one of his patrols to take five prisoners and seize important supplies. He was decorated with the croix de Guerre and obtained his first citation. Injured on June 18, he remained at the head of his section. On 20 and 22 June he fought near the Petit-Saint-Bernard col where his action forced the Italian troops to withdraw. He received a second citation, then was made Knight of the chevalier de la Légion d’honneur. He was still only 24 years old.

Morel then served in the Army of the Armistice at Annecy under commandant Vallette d'Osia and participated in the sequestering of weapons and supplies. In 1941 he was appointed instructor at Saint-Cyr, which had moved to Aix-en-Provence in the zone libre. Here he quietly encouraged his pupils to join the French Resistance.

== Resistance and the Glières Plateau ==
After the invasion of the zone libre by the Germans in November 1942, Tom Morel went underground, and joined the resistance in Haute-Savoie where he found his old commander, Vallette d'Osia, organizer and head of the Armée Secrète (AS) for that department. He signed up, along with Vallette d'Osia's old adjutant Captain Maurice Anjot, to organise the AS, whose numbers were multiplying after the February 1943 initiation of the STO, the scheme of obligatory labour in Germany.

In September 1943, Vallette d'Osia was arrested by the Germans who had recently replaced the Italians in occupying Savoie. Vallette d'Osia's successor was Captain Henri Romans-Petit, organiser and head of the AS in Ain. Romans-Petit appointed Morel head of the Maquis in the department, and gave him the task of organizing the receipt of allied parachute drops on the Glières Plateau.

On 31 January 1944, Morel occupied the plateau with 120 maquisards. By the end of February, he had approximately 300 men under his orders, whom he organized into three companies. Morel was distinguished by his talent as a leader and trainer of these men who had come from varied geographical, social and political backgrounds. He took up the doctrine of "live free or die", and disciplined his battalion to turn it into unified and effective force in the fight for liberation. In February and March, numerous clashes occurred with the Groupe mobile de réserve (GMR) and with the Milice of the Vichy régime who were surrounding the plateau.

On 2 March, Morel decided on commando operation against the Beau Séjour hotel at Saint-Jean-de-Sixt where the GMR were stationed. Thirty of them were taken prisoner. They had to provide currency in exchange for Michel Fournier, medical student and auxiliary doctor for the maquis, who had been arrested at le Grand-Bornand several days earlier. The prisoners were freed but, in spite of the agreement on the honour of the Annecy police intendent, Fournier was not released.

Thereafter, the Maquis benefited from the arrival of 120 fighters from Chablais and Giffre. Morel decided to lead another operation, more significant and hazardous, against the staff of the GMR, "Aquitaine", in Entremont at the foot of the Glières Plateau. Couret, officer of the peace and interim commandant of the GMR, had not performed his duties regarding the resistance, and his superior, commandant Lefebvre, who had arrived on 7 March, refused to speak to the Maquis. Over 100 men took part in the operation on the night of March 9–10. One of the groups, commanded directly by Morel, succeeded in taking the hôtel de France where the GMR staff was based. The maquisards disarmed their prisoners, but Lefebvre pulled out a concealed gun, and fired on Morel at close range, shooting him directly in the heart. Morel collapsed dead. Lefebvre was killed immediately.

Morel's body was brought up to the plateau where he was buried on 13 March after a moving religious ceremony. On 2 May, his body was brought down to the valley, and he remains buried today in the Morette military cemetery, now the Glières en Haute-Savoie national necropolis.

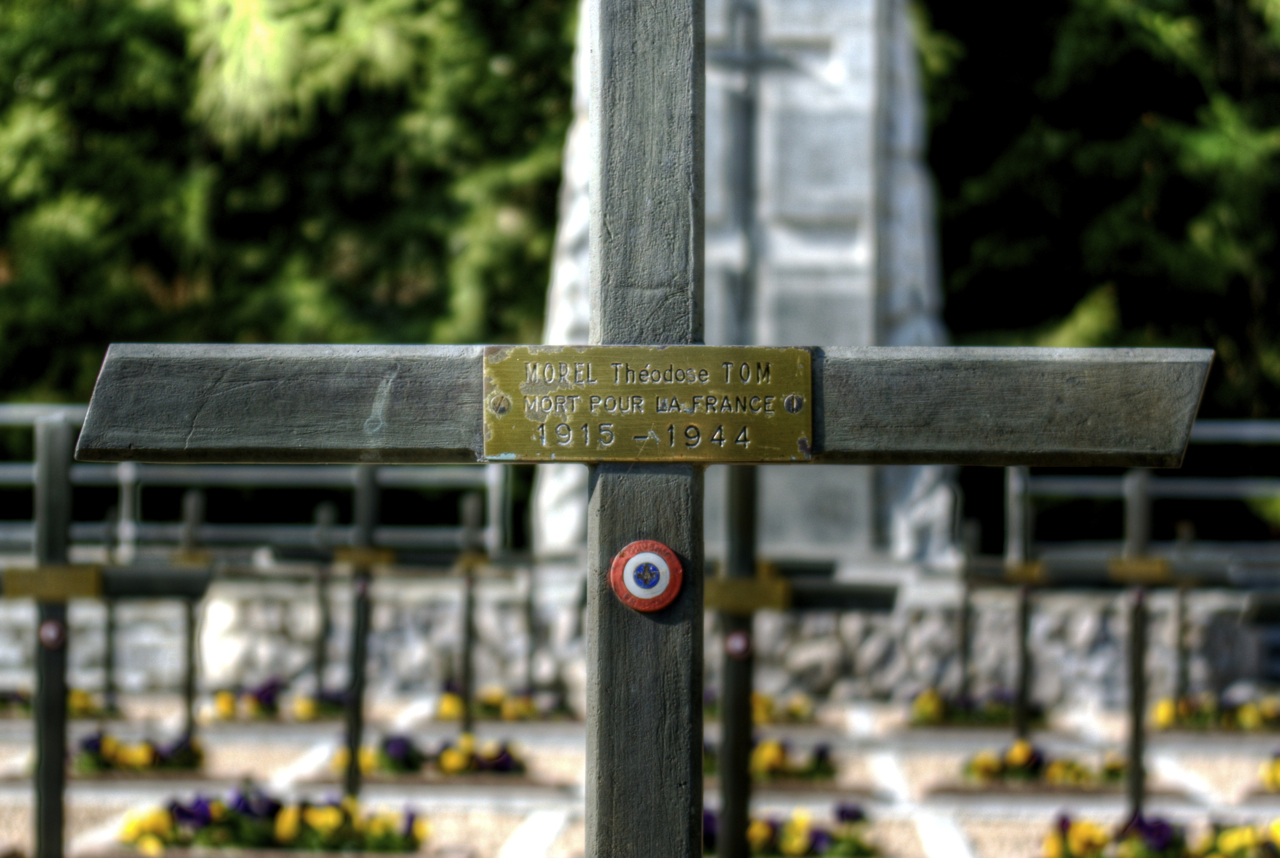
Morel's tomb at the Morette Necropolis, 2009

== Posterity ==
On 5 November 1944, General Charles de Gaulle awarded Morel the posthumous title of croix de la Libération. The citation was as follows:

[...] Already made a knight of the Légion d'honneur at the age of 24 for having captured an Italian company on the Alpine front in June 1940. As an instructor at Saint-Cyr in 1942, he pointed his pupils towards the Resistance, and threw himself body and soul into the struggle against the invader, acting in turn as an acquirer of supplies, information agent and propagandist. Unmasked by the enemy, he launched himself with immense faith into the Savoy maquis. Unarmed, he attacked a German officer in single combat and rendered him powerless. After becoming head of the Glières battalion, he was the soul of the resistance on the plateau, its leader and organizer. On 9 March 1944, having taken the village of Entremont by assault, he was casually assassinated during an negotiation which he had asked from his conquered foes in order to spare the pointless shedding of French blood. He will remain an incarnation of French patriotism in the epic of the resistance, and one of the most prestigious martyrs of Savoie [...].

The 174th promotion from the Saint-Cyr academy was named Lieutenant Tom Morel in his honor.

Morel's personality was summarized by Pierre Golliet in the book Glières - Haute-Savoie - Première bataille de la Résistance - 31 janvier - 26 mars 1944 (by Golliet, Pierre, Helfgott, Julien et Louis Jourdand 1946):

From where did this force come to him? Without doubt from his natural energy, which was striking, from his intrepid and fiery character. But it was also with an ideal of generosity and sacrifice, which was the conscious and desired fruit of his faith: "Pray", he said to the priest who was his confidant, "that I will keep to the end, in the midst of difficulties just as among the happiness and joys of family, this soul, which rejects mediocrity and which always wants to raise itself into nobility". From one end of his soldier's life to the other, Tom will have been borne by this wish, which is the wish of true heroism.

In October 1995, the new dormitory of the Saint-Cyr military academy was named the Tom Morel building.

The barracks of the 27e BCA carries the name of Tom Morel.

Tom Morel is the father of Admiral Philippe Morel (d. 22 June 2010) who was president of the Association of families of the compagnons de la libération and vice-président of the Association des Glières. Tom Morel's widow, Marie-Germaine Morel née Lamy, died 14 November 2010.

Both one of the Rover Crews of Paris of the UIGSE and the second troop of the Mouvement des Scouts Unitaires de France, Saint-Cloud group (France, Hauts-de-Seine) bears Morel's name.

== Bibliography ==
- Tom Morel, héros des Glières, Patrick de Gmeline, Presses de la Cité, Paris, 2008.
- Lieutenant Morel, être de lumière et entraîneur d'hommes, André Ravier (père), Sarment/Éditions du Jubilé, Paris, 2003.
