= Séchelles =

- Agnicourt-et-Séchelles
- Marie-Jean Hérault de Séchelles
- Jean Moreau de Séchelles

== See also ==
- Seychelles
