= Battle of Montcornet =

1940 battle of the Second World War

- Part of the Battle of France of the Second World War
Date	17 – 19 May 1940
Location	Montcornet, France 49°41′47″N 04°01′05″E
Result	French victory

Belligerents
France	Germany

Commanders and leaders
(French Third Republic) Charles de Gaulle	(Nazi Germany) Heinz Guderian (Nazi Germany) Wolfram Freiherr von Richthofen

Units involved
4e Division cuirassée	1st Panzer Division

Strength
Over 200 tanks	Unknown

Casualties and losses
103 tanks/AFVs disabled, destroyed or abandoned	40–50 tanks
- Montcornet a commune in the Aisne department of Picardy in northern France

The Battle of Montcornet, on 17 May 1940 took place during the Battle of France. The French 4e Division cuirassée (Colonel Charles de Gaulle), attacked the German-held village of Montcornet with over 200 tanks. The French drove off the Germans but later had to retreat due to lack of support and the intervention of the Luftwaffe.

== Background ==
On 10 May 1940, the Third Reich had launched a vast offensive against the Netherlands, Belgium and France. After the German breakthrough in the Battle of Sedan on 13 May, the Germans had driven the French troops to a hasty retreat.

== Prelude ==
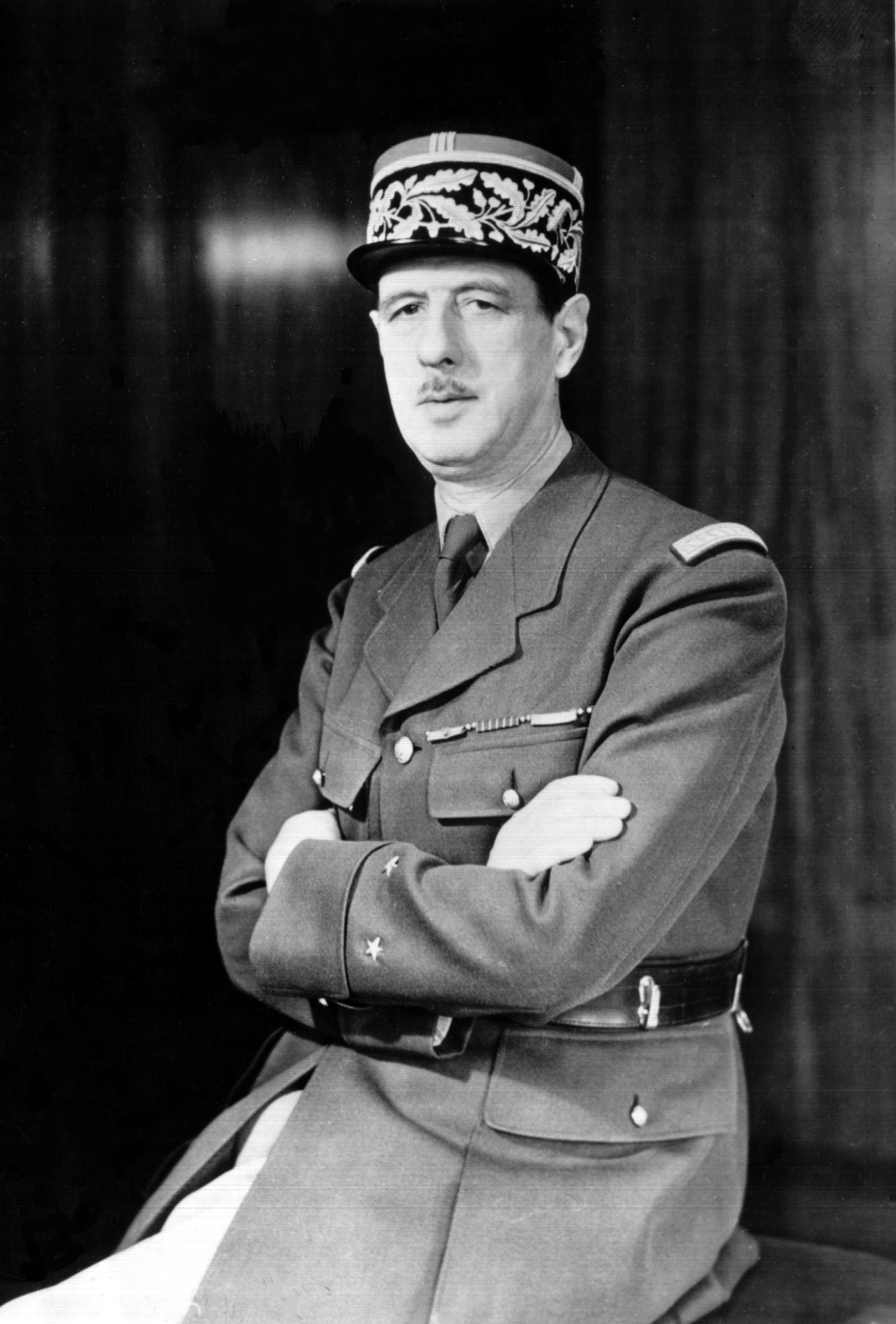
De Gaulle during World War II, wearing the two stars of a général de brigade on his sleeve

De Gaulle had just taken command of the new 4e Division cuirassée (4e DCr) on 12 May as the Germans were fighting to break through. That day, with three tank battalions assembled, less than a third of his paper strength, he was summoned to headquarters and told to attack to gain time for the Sixth Army (General Robert Touchon) to redeploy from the Maginot Line to the Aisne; it was his chance to implement his ideas of tank warfare.

The next day, De Gaulle was appointed commander of the 4e DCr, comprising 5,000 men and 85 tanks, with which he led a counter-attack on the village of Montcornet on 17 May. Montcornet had strategic importance because it cut the roads to Reims, Laon and Saint-Quentin, and was a point of transit for the supply echelons of the 1st Panzer Division.

== Battle ==
As De Gaulle advanced, he commandeered some retreating cavalry and artillery units and also received an extra half-brigade, one of whose battalions included some heavy B1 bis tanks. On 17 May, at 4:14 a.m., elements of the 4e DCr advanced on Montcornet. After surrounding the village, around noon, the French B1 bis tanks came under fire from 3.7 cm Pak 36 anti-tank guns and from German tanks. Though outnumbered and without air support, he attacked and destroyed a German convoy south of the village. De Gaulle lost 23 of his 90 vehicles to mines, anti-tank weapons and to air attacks by Stukas. On 18 May he was reinforced by two fresh regiments of armoured cavalry, bringing his strength up to 150 armoured vehicles.

De Gaulle ordered infantry to neutralise German defence pockets in Chivres and D2 tanks to secure Clermont-les-Fermes. Around 4:00 p.m., De Gaulle ordered a new attack on Montcornet but because the tank crews had not received detailed maps of the sector and came under fire from 88mm Flak guns, the attack failed. Around 6:00 p.m., German aircraft intervened and the 4e DCr retreated to its original positions.

De Gaulle attacked again on 19 May and his forces were once again devastated by German Stukas and artillery. He ignored orders to withdraw and in the early afternoon demanded two more divisions from Touchon but was refused. Although de Gaulle's tanks forced the German infantry to retreat to Chaumont-Porcien, the action brought only temporary relief and did little to slow the spearhead of the German advance.

== Aftermath ==
It was one of the few successes the French enjoyed while suffering defeats elsewhere across the country. A number of the B1 bis tanks had to be abandoned when they ran out of petrol, and others when they sank into swamps. The French lost 23 tanks in the attack, while taking around 130 German prisoners. De Gaulle fought another engagement at the Battle of Abbeville.

== See also ==
- List of French military equipment of World War II
- List of German military equipment of World War II
