= 15th Military Division =

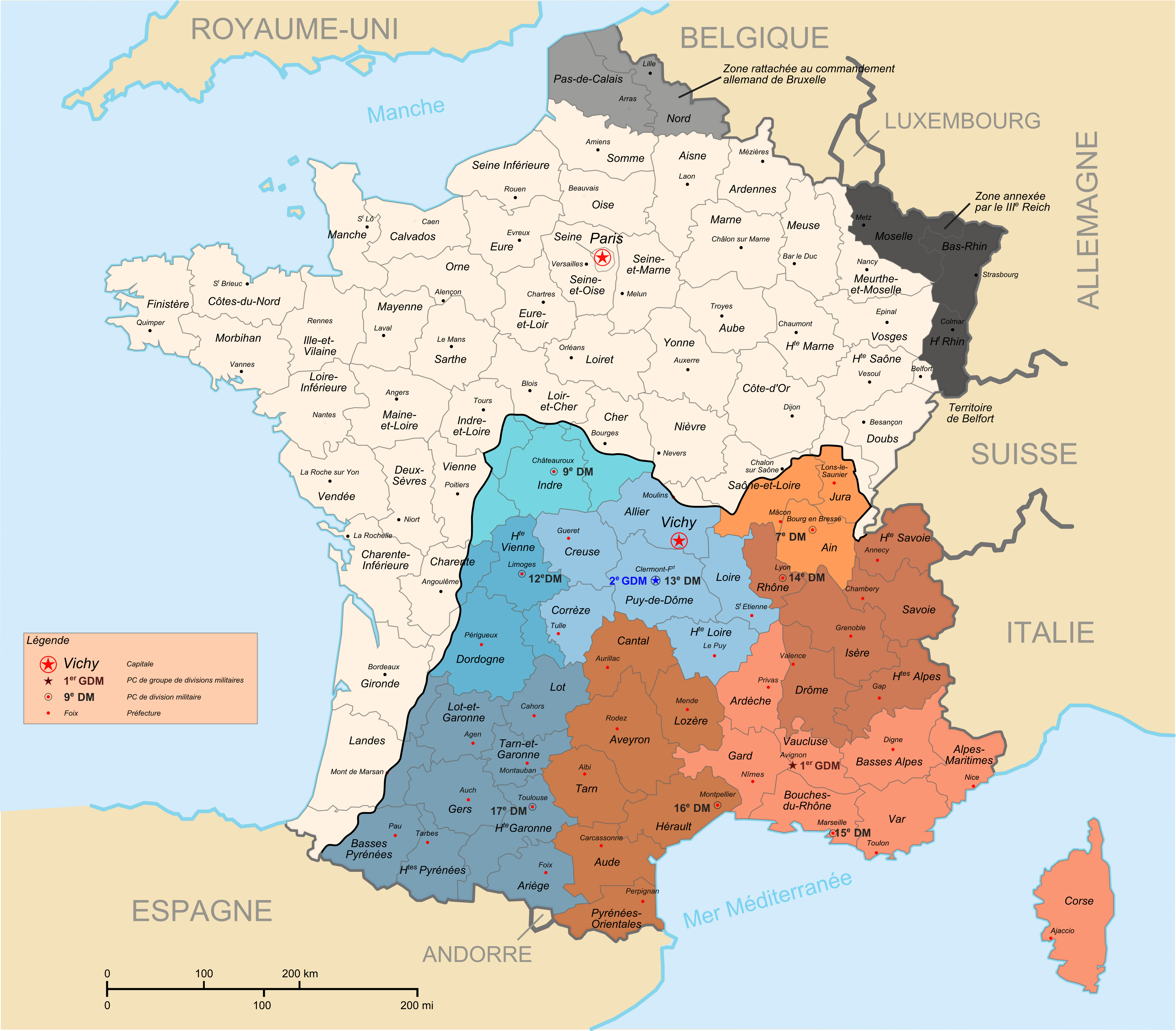
- Active: December 1940 - November 1942
- Disbanded: 27 November 1942
- Country: Vichy France
- Branch: Vichy French Army
- Type: Infantry
- Role: Military Garrison and Infantry
- Size: Division
- Garrison/HQ: Marseille
- Engagements: World War II

The 15th Military Division (French: 15^{e} Division Militaire) also known as the 15th Military Region (French: 15^{e} Région Militaire) was an infantry formation of division-size of the Armistice Army that was active during World War II. The division's headquarters was in Marseille. This division was subordinated to the 1st Group of Military Divisions.

== History ==
The 15th Military Division was formed on 12 September 1940. On 8 November 1942 at 15:00, just before Case Anton, the 15th Military Division positioned themselves for battle. Like the rest of the Army of Vichy France, this division, except for the Garde, was demobilized on 27 November 1942.

== Commanders ==
1. General de corps d'armée (equivalent to Lieutenant-General) Henri-Fernand Dentz (27 June to 28 December 1940)
2. MG Maxime Jean Vincent Germain
3. MG Jean-Louis-Auguste Humbert or MG Jules-Phillipe Octave Decamp

== Composition ==
The 15th Military Division's Order of Battle was such:

- 43rd Alpine Infantry Regiment (French: 43^{e} Régiment d'Infanterie Alpine):
  - HQ (at Fréjus)
  - 1st Bn. (at Fréjus)
  - 2nd Bn. (at Fréjus)
  - 3rd Bn. (at Arles)
- 21st Colonial Infantry Regiment (French: 21^{e} Régiment d'Infanterie Coloniale):
  - HQ (at Marseille)
  - 1st Bn. (at Marseille)
  - 2nd Bn. (at Marseille)
  - 3rd Bn. (at Tarascon)
- 173rd Autonomous Battalion (French: 173^{e} Bataillon autonome de la Corse) (in Bastia, Corsica)
- 2nd Chasseurs Alpins Demi-brigade (French: 2^{e} Demi-Brigade de Chasseurs Alpins) (HQ at Hyères)
  - 20th Chasseurs Alpins Battalion (French: 20^{e} Bataillon de Chasseurs Alpins) (at Digne)
  - 24th Chasseurs Alpins Battalion (French: 24^{e} Bataillon de Chasseurs Alpins) (at Hyères)
  - 25th Chasseurs Alpins Battalion (French: 25^{e} Bataillon de Chasseurs Alpins) (at Hyères)
- 12th Cuirassier Regiment (French: 12^{e} Régiment de Cuirassiers) (in Orange):
  - 1 cavalry bn - 2 sqns
  - 1 bicycle bn - 2 cos
  - 1 mixed bn - 1 bicycle co & 1 armored car co.
- 10th Colonial Artillery Regiment (French: 10^{e} Régiment d'Artillerie Coloniale):
  - HQ (at Nîmes)
  - 1st Bn. (each battalion had 3 75mm btrys) (at Nîmes)
  - 2nd Bn. (each battalion had 3 75mm btrys) (at Marseille)
  - 3rd Bn. (1 mot 75mm btry & 2 Mountain 75mm btrys) (at Draguignan)
- 7th Engineer Battalion (at Avignon)
- 8/15th Signals Group (Note: The term 'group' is used for support units, though equivalent to that of a company.) (at Avignon)
- 15th Transportation Group (at Marseille)
- 2nd Garde Regiment - HQ at Marseille
  - 1^{er} Bataillon
    - HQ - Marseille
    - 1^{er} Escadron - Cavalry/Reconnaissance
    - 2^{e} Escadron - Cavalry/Reconnaissance
    - 3^{e} Escadron - Infantry
    - 4^{e} Escadron - Motorcycle
  - 2^{e} Bataillon
    - HQ - Nice
    - 5^{e} Escadron - Motorcycle
    - 6^{e} Escadron - Infantry
    - 7^{e} Escadron - Infantry
    - 8^{e} Escadron - Infantry

=== Military Commands ===
The following Departemental Military Commands (French: Commandant Militaire du Département) were under the 15th Military Division:

- Bouches-du-Rhône (at Marseille)
- Gard (at Nîmes)
- Ardèche (at Privas)
- Vaucluse (at Avignon)
- Var (at Toulon)
- Basses Alpes (at Digne)
- Alpes Maritimes (at Nice)
- Corse (at Bastia)

Numerous Military District Commands (French: Commandement du District Militaire) of these places were subordinated to the 15th Military Division:

- Aix
- Draguignan
- Grasse
- Ajaccio
- Corte
- Sartène

=== Training grounds ===
The 15th Military Division had two training grounds, namely those at Carpiagne and Garrigues.

== Sources ==
- BnF (1 July 1997). "Dentz, Henri-Fernand (1881-1945)". catalogue.bnf.fr (in French). Archived from the original on 5 March 2016.
- Nafziger, George (1992). "Vichy French Forces in France – 1 March 1941" (PDF). Archived from the original (PDF) on 27 January 2017.
- Niehorster, Leo; Sharp, Lee (31 October 2014a). "Vichy France – Order of Battle 15th Military Division – 15 April 1941". Archived from the original on 26 January 2019.
- Niehorster, Leo; Sharp, Lee (31 October 2014b). "Vichy France – Army in Metropolitan France – 15 April 1941". Archived from the original on 20 March 2015.
- Paxton, Robert O. (2004). L'Armée de Vichy. Le corps des officiers français (in French). Tallandier. ISBN 9791021016774.
- Pettibone, Charles D. (2010). The Organization and Order of Battles of Militaries in World War II. Vol. VI: Italy and France. Victoria, British Columbia, Canada: Trafford Publishing. ISBN 978-1426946332.
- Vauvillier, François; Sumner, Ian (1998). The French Army 1939-45. Men-at-Arms. Vol. I. United Kingdom: Osprey Publishing. ISBN 9781855326668.
