= Pierre Jules de la Font =

French general

Pierre Jules André Marie de La Font
- Born: 9 July 1885
- Died: 7 July 1963 (aged 77)
- Military career
- Allegiance: France
- Branch: French Army
- Service years: 1906–1943
- Rank: General
- Commands: 3rd Light Mechanized Division; 4th Armored Division
- Conflicts: World War I; World War II

Pierre Jules André Marie de La Font (9 July 1885 – 7 July 1963) was a French general of cavalry.

== Biography ==
Graduating from Saint-Cyr in 1906, he took courses at the Cavalry School at Saumur 1907. In 1915, at his request, he left the cavalry and was assigned to the infantry. He was mentioned 4 times, mainly for dangerous reconnaissance. At the beginning of World War II, he commanded the Cavalry School at Saumur and established the 5th Light Mechanized Brigade with which he fought during the Battle of Belgium. He next became the commander of the 3rd Light Mechanized Division and was evacuated at Dunkirk. He returned to France and took command of the 4th Armored Division. By 1941 he became General Officer Commanding the Vichy French 7th Military Division.

He became the Deputy Chief of Staff of the Armistice Army and Inspector of Cavalry he was sacked before being put on leave on 1 March 1943. de La Font was appointed by Henri Giraud to succeed Aubert Frère as the leader of the ORA after Frère was arrested. However, the letter was intercepted by the Gestapo and by chance de La Font escaped arrest at the end of July. de La Font went into hiding for the rest of the German occupation.
