= 14th Military Division =

7th Military Division
- Active: December 1940 - November 1942
- Country: Vichy France
- Branch: Vichy French Army
- Type: Infantry
- Role: Military Garrison and Infantry
- Size: Division
- Garrison/HQ: Lyon
- Engagements: World War II

The 14th Military Division was a division sized unit of the Vichy France army. The division was formed in late 1940 and demobilized in late 1942. It was under the control of the 1st Military Corps and controlled units in East France notably on the Swiss border.

== History ==
The 14th Military Division was organized in September 1940 under Lieutenant General Alfred-Marie-Joseph-Louis Montagne. In November 1942, the division was de-mobilised. The division was under the command of the I Group of Military Divisions, also known as the I Military Corps. It was headquartered in Lyon in Southern France. In addition to the division controlling military units it also supervised the areas of the 1st Military District and 2nd Military District in addition to a security squadron and training grounds.

== Organization ==
Structure of the division in 1941 (names in English and French):

- Deputy Commander, 7th Military Division (French: Commandant Adjoint de la 7ème Division Militaire)
  - Infantry Commander, 7th Military Division (French: Commandant d'Infanterie, 7ème Division Militaire)
    - 1st Infantry Regiment (French: 1er Régiment d'Infanterie)
    - 159th Infantry Regiment (French: 159e Régiment d'Infanterie)
    - 3rd Mountain Infantry Half-Brigade (French: 3e Brigade d'Infanterie de Montagne)
      - 6th Chasseurs Alpins Battalion (French: 6e Bataillon de Chasseurs Alpins)
      - 13th Chasseurs Alpins Battalion (French: 13e Bataillon de Chasseurs Alpins)
      - 27th Chasseurs Alpins Battalion (French: 27e Bataillon de Chasseurs Alpins)
  - 2nd Artillery Regiment (French: 2e Régiment d'Artillerie)
  - 11th Cuirassier Regiment (French: 11e Régiment de Cuirassiers)
  - 4th Engineer Regiment (French: 4e Régiment du Génie)
  - 8/14e Groupe de Transmissions - (8/14th Signals Battalion)
  - 14e Compagnie de Supply - (14th Supply Company)
  - Commandement Militaire de Department - (Military Departments Command)
    - Commandement Militaire de Department de Rhone (Military Department Command of Rhone)
    - Commandement Militaire de Department de Drôme (Military Department Command of Drôme)
    - Commandement Militaire de Department de Isère (Military Department Command of Isère)
    - Commandement Militaire de Department de Haute-Savoie (Military Department Command of Haute-Savoie)
    - Commandement Militaire de Department de Hautes-Alpes (Military Department Command of Hautes-Alpes)
    - Commandement Militaire de Department de Savoie (Military Department Command of Savoie)
  - Commandement de District Militaire - (Military Districts Command)
    - Commandement de District Militaire de Saint-Julien (Military Department Command of Saint-Julien)
    - Commandement de District Militaire de Bonneville (Military Department Command of Bonneville)
    - Commandement de District Militaire de Thonon (Military Department Command of Thonon)
    - Commandement de District Militaire de Albertville (Military Department Command of Albertville)
    - Commandement de District Militaire de Saint-Jean-de-Maurienne (Military Department Command of Saint-Jean-de-Maurienne)
    - Commandement de District Militaire de Briançon (Military Department Command of Briançon)
    - Commandement de District Militaire de Barcelonnette (Military Department Command of Barcelonnette)
  - Chamerand Training Group (Groupe d'Entrainement Chamerand)
  - 1er Régiment de Garde de la Légion - (1st Legion Guard Regiment)
    - Headquarters - Lyon
    - 1er Bataillon
      - Headquarters - Lyon
      - 1er Escadron - Reconnaissance
      - 2e Escadron - Infantry
      - 3e Escadron - Motorcycle
    - 2e Bataillon
      - Headquarters - Annecy
      - 5e Escadron - Motorcycle
      - 6e Escadron - Reconnaissance
      - 7e Escadron - Infantry
      - 8e Escadron - Infantry
