= Montcornet, Aisne =

Montcornet
- Commune
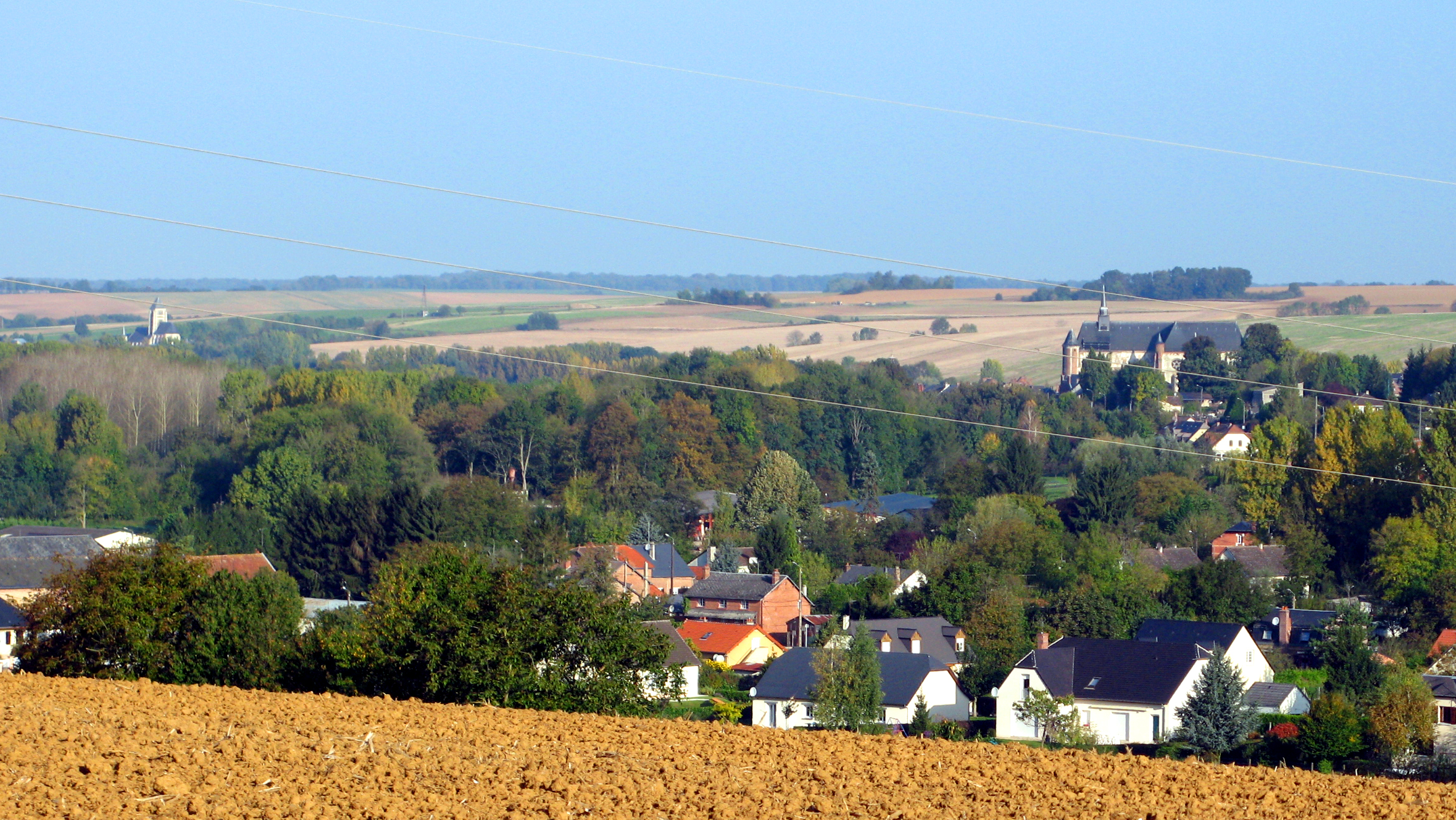
- A general view of Chaourse and Montcornet

- Coat of arms
- Location of Montcornet
- Location within France Location within Hauts-de-France
- Coordinates: 49°41′47″N 4°01′05″E
- Country: France
- Region: Hauts-de-France
- Department: Aisne
- Arrondissement: Vervins
- Canton: Vervins
- Intercommunality: Portes de la Thiérache

Government
  - Mayor (2026–32): Thomas Hennequin
- Area^{1}: 5.74 km^{2} (2.22 sq mi)
- Elevation: 112 m (367 ft)
- Highest elevation: 177 m (581 ft)
- Lowest elevation: 108 m (354 ft)
- Population (2023): 1,207
  - Density: 210/km^{2} (545/sq mi)
- Time zone: UTC+01:00 (CET)
  - Summer (DST): UTC+02:00 (CEST)
- INSEE/Postal code: 02502 /02340
- ^{1} French Land Register data, which excludes lakes, ponds, glaciers > 1 km^{2} (0.386 sq mi or 247 acres) and river estuaries.

Montcornet (French pronunciation: [mɔ̃kɔʁnɛ]) is a commune in the Aisne department in Hauts-de-France in northern France.

== Battle of Montcornet ==
On 14 May 1940, Charles de Gaulle was given command of the new 4e Division cuirassée and ordered to execute a counterattack toward Montcornet, with the objective of slowing the German advance. This was one of the only counterattacks of the French campaign that succeeded in repulsing the German troops.

== Population ==
Historical population
Year	Pop.	±% p.a.
1968	1,486	—
1975	1,623	+1.27%
1982	1,781	+1.34%
1990	1,755	−0.18%
1999	1,690	−0.42%
2007	1,644	−0.34%
2012	1,493	−1.91%
2017	1,338	−2.17%
2023	1,207	−1.70%
Source: INSEE

== See also ==
- Communes of the Aisne department
