= Alfred Montagne =

French soldier

Alfred-Marie-Joseph-Louis Montagne
- Born: June 20, 1881; Pézenas, France
- Died: February 26, 1963 (aged 81) Montpellier, France
- Allegiance: France
- Branch: French Army
- Rank: Lieutenant General
- Commands: 25th Motorized Division; 12th Army Corps; 15th Army Corps; 14th Military Division
- Conflicts: First World War; Second World War: Battle of France; Italian invasion of France
- Awards: Legion of Honour; Croix de Guerre

Alfred-Marie-Joseph-Louis Montagne (20 June 1881 – 26 February 1963) was a French general who commanded the 15th Army Corps during the Battle of France (1940). He was responsible for the defence of Menton during the Italian invasion. He published a recollection of the war, La bataille pour Nice et la Provence (Montpellier: Éditions des Arceaux), in 1952.

Montagne was born at Pézenas. In the First World War he was wounded and cited in dispatches five times. He received the Légion d'honneur and the Croix de Guerre. He replaced General Henri Dentz at the head of the 15th Army Corps in 1939. Like his superior, René Olry, he was an artillery officer by training. His knowledge of the terrain of the Maritime Alps was exquisite.
