= Glières plateau =

Limestone plateau in the Bornes Massif in France

Coordinates: 45°57′54″N 06°20′02″E

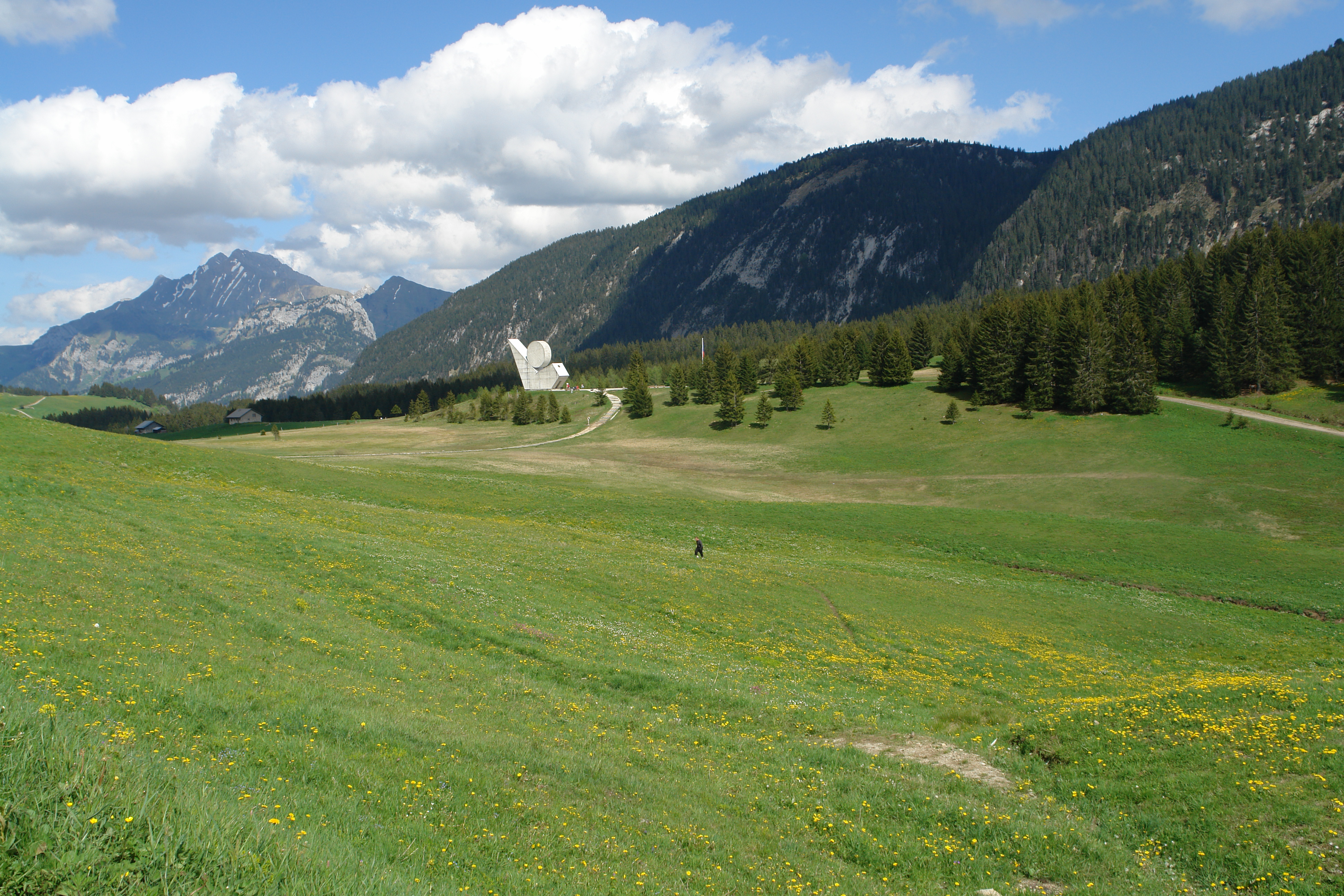
The Glières Plateau and the monumental sculpture of Émile Gilioli.

The Glières plateau (French: plateau des Glières, pronounced [plato de ɡlijɛʁ]) is a limestone plateau in the Bornes Massif in Haute-Savoie department in the Auvergne-Rhône-Alpes region in south-eastern France. It is 29 km from La Roche-sur-Foron and 15 km from Thorens-Glières, located around the communes of Le Petit-Bornand-les-Glières.

== Etymology ==
In the Francoprovençal language, glière means a rocky and sandy plateau without rivers. In the local speech, the word is found only in the singular. Following the events of March 1944, the journalist Dépollier spoke of Glière, in the singular. It was only after the Second World War that the name took on the majestic plural. Although some Savoyards still refer to the plateau as "Glières", the majority now call it "les Glières".

== Geography ==
The Glières plateau is a limestone plateau in the Bornes Massif in Haute-Savoie department in the Auvergne-Rhône-Alpes region in south-eastern France. It is 29 km from La Roche-sur-Foron and 15 km from Thorens-Glières, located around the communes of Le Petit-Bornand-les-Glières.

The plateau, located between the Auges mountains (1800m) and the Frêtes, is in reality a valley and has several levels. Its mean altitude is 1450m and it is bounded by cliffs of Urgonian limestone.

Places include the Lanches wood, the Auges chalets, the Mouilles chalet, the l'Ovine chalet, the Notre-Dame des Neiges chapel, the Glières col, the col de l'Ovine, the maison du plateau, Paccot parking, the pas du Loup, the plaine de Dran, the plan du Loup, and the pointe de Puvat.

== History ==
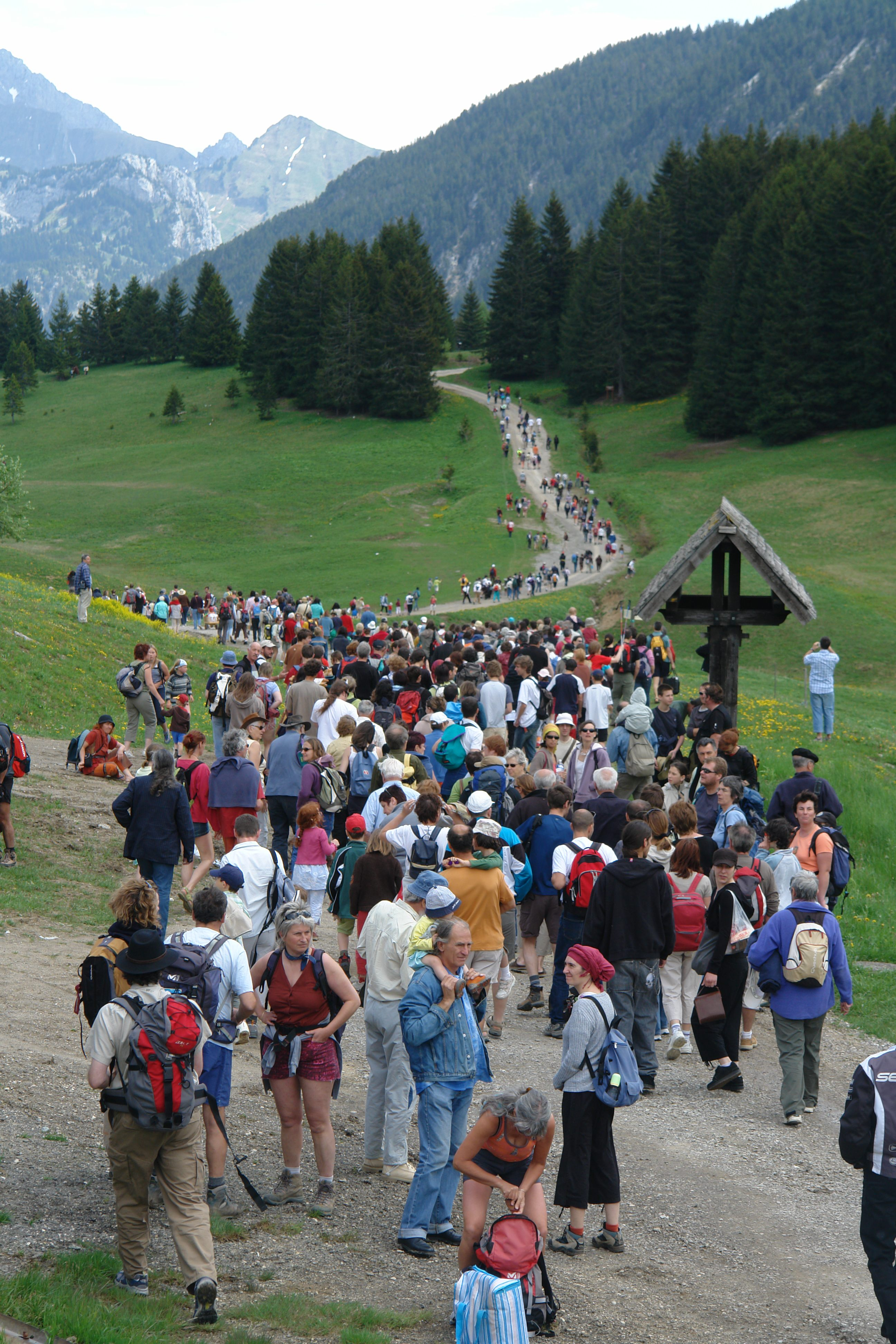
Commemoration, following a visit by Nicolas Sarkozy

The Glières plateau was an important site of the French Resistance groupduring the Second World War, its mountainous territory giving rise to a Maquis des Glières which was organized and led by lieutenant Tom Morel, Compagnon de la Libération. The plateau was chosen in January 1944 to accept British parachute drops of arms to supply the local resistance, then as a base of operations against the German rear to take place at the moment when the awaited landings by the allies would occur. The plateau was cut off, poorly accessible by road and the enemy but identifiable by allied aircraft through its proximity to Lake Annecy. The "battle of Glières" March 1944 left 121 dead from the maquisards against almost 5000 soldiers from the Wehrmacht and the Vichy milice.

Although the British managed to carry out three parachute drops onto the plateau of which a large one on the 10 March may have brought some 45 tonnes of weapons, the reinforcements promised by Captain "Cantinier" Jean Rosenthal, the Free French envoy, never arrived.

In 1973, the national monument of the Resistance, created by the sculptor Émile Gilioli, was constructed in memory of the dead of the Resistance on a field offered for this purpose by Jean-François de Roussy de Sales. The monument was inaugurated on 2 September 1973 by André Malraux. The sculpture showed the sun held by a hand.

== 21st century ==
In 2007, Nicolas Sarkozy made a stop there on the eve of the 2007 French Presidential Election, and declared that he would return each year after he was elected. This visit was followed by a demonstration of 3000 people on 13 May 2007. On 17 March 2008, Sarkozy returned for the first time, to commemorate the resistance. The media influence of this "pilgrimage" recalled similar high-profile visits by former President François Mitterrand to the Roche de Solutré.

On 17 May 2009, on the instigation of the CRHA (Citoyens Résistants d'Hier et d'Aujourd'hui), a rally was organized on the Glières plateau to commemorate the republic's values of solidarity, fraternity, living together and of justice as expressed in the 15 March 1944 manifesto of the Conseil national de la Résistance. Stéphane Hessel, godfather of the association, former resistance fighter and follower of the communist party Raymond Aubrac, former communist resistance fighter Walter Bassan, Colomiers schoolteacher Alain Refalo, and head of general psychiatry in the 8th sector in Essonne and psychoanalyst Dr. Michaël Guyader held a discussion on the need to continue the fight of the Resistance and to stand on the pedestal of social advancements which the CNR programme had presented. These demonstrations and discussions became part of the framework of the politics of opposition.

== Glières Plateau of Algiers ==
An urban area of Algiers, at the time in 1962 the French departement d'Alger, was named the "Plateau des Glières", as a result of the presence of the monument to those fallen for France in the two world wars, and particularly in homage to the Savoie maquisards in the Second World War.

== Tourism ==
Cross-country skiing is today the main activity on the plateau in winter with over 36 km of groomed pistes alternative and skating, as well as now several kilometres of groomed pistes for walking.

The plateau is dotted with ancient farms and stables, some of which have been converted into restaurants or gîtes.

Access is somewhat difficult; two winding roads are in use, neither being closed during winter.

A marked itinerary directs walkers around the plateau in summer, with numerous signs telling the visitor about Alpine life at the beginning of the 20th century and about the Battle of Glières, with the monument in honour of the Resistance.

== Other activities ==
Snowshoeing and cross-country skiing are frequently practised, and snowkiting is also possible. A luge piste is set up each year for children.

Speleological activities are also available, with about 15 caves over 150 metres deep catalogued in les Frêtes. The deepest hole currently known on Glières plateau is the tanne à Paccot, also called the A2 hole, estimated at 400 metres.

== Filmography ==
- (in French) La Jeune Fille et les loups with Laetitia Casta, filmed on the plateau in March 2007.
- (in French) Walter, retour en résistance, by Gilles Perret, filmed partly on le plateau in May 2007-8.
- (in French) Glières 44, le cortège des ombres, by Patrice Morel, a 52-minute documentary produced in 2004 by France 3 Rhône-Alpes-Auvergne. Available from the video libraries of France 3 Lyon, France 3 Grenoble et INA.
