= Émile Gilioli =

French sculptor

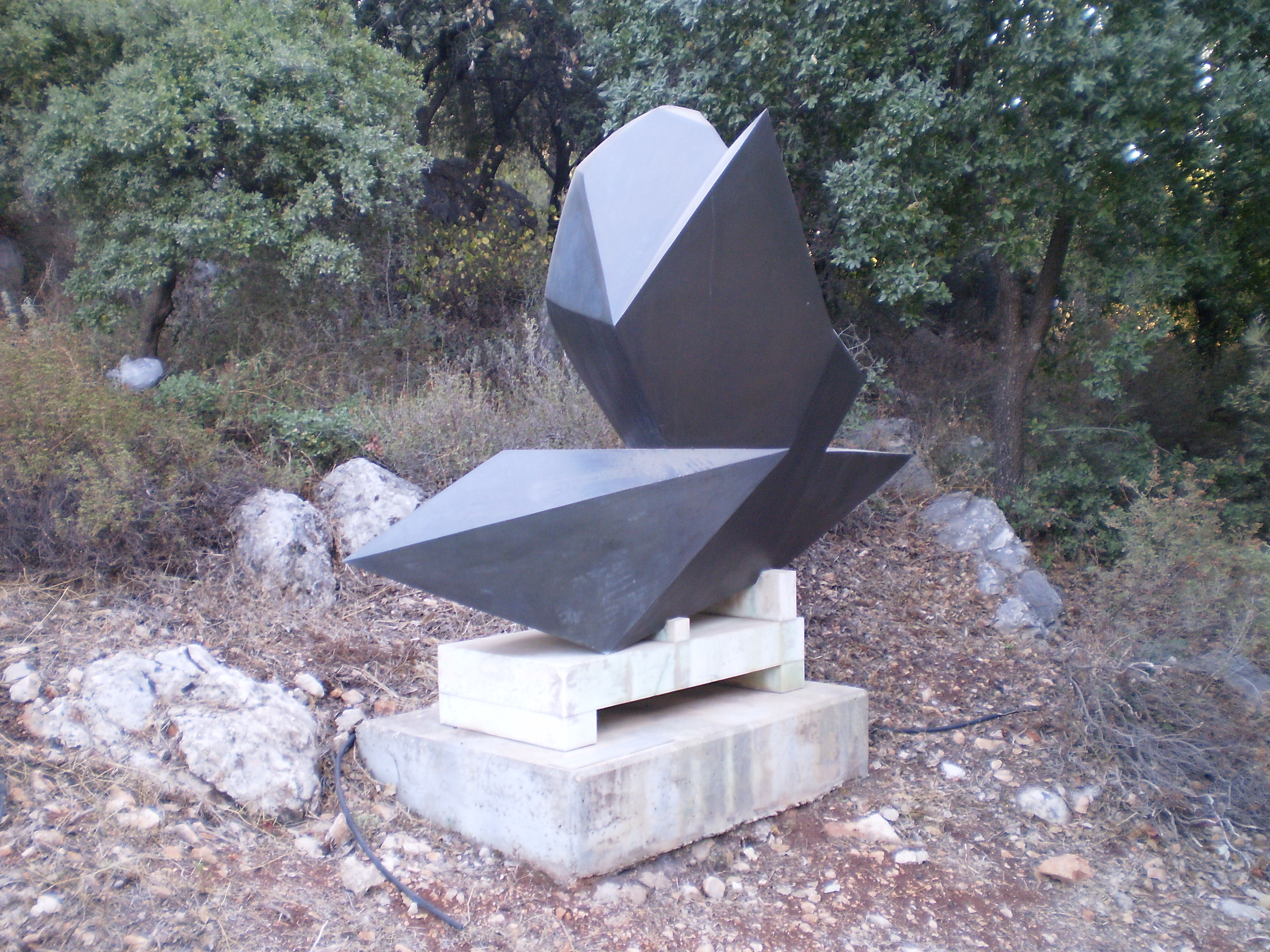
Je batiri ma maison sur un roc, Amirim, Israel

Émile Gilioli (10 June 1911 in Paris – 19 January 1977 in Paris) was a French-Italian sculptor, one of the representatives of abstract French sculpture in the 1950s.

== Biography ==
Émile Gilioli was born to a family of Italian shoemakers who had settled beside the Canal Saint-Martin. After the First World War, the family moved back towards Italy, settling in Nice.

In 1932, Gilioli took courses at the École des Arts Décoratifs de Nice, notably with the future artist Marie Raymond.

During the Second World War, Gilioli was mobilized in Grenoble where he passed the remainder of the conflict. He made the acquaintance of Andry-Fracy, conservationist at the Grenoble Musée des beaux-arts, and led him to discover cubism.

After the war, Gilioli settled in Saint-Martin-de-la-Cluze near Grenoble, where he sculpted in his workshop. His art was associated in a certain way with the deeds of the French Resistance. He became friendly with Thomas Gleb. He advised his friend Georges Ladrey, who wished to leave the Alpes pour Paris with the intention of perfecting his skills in an art school, to develop his personal artistic vision, judging that his technique was sufficiently refined.

In 1947, Gilioli exhibited in the salon des réalités nouvelles in Paris.

In 1949, Gilioli took part in the first Salon de la jeune sculpture in the garden and chapel of the Musée Rodin in Paris. The first salon was attended by 63 sculptors including Gilioli, Emmanuel Auricoste, Étienne Hajdu, Baltasar Lobo and Berto Lardera.

From 1954 onwards, Gilioli took part in collective exhibitions with other artists such as Étienne Martin, Alicia Penalba, François Stahly and Simone Boisecq.

In 1997 to mark the 20th anniversary of Gilioli's death, the municipalité of Saint-Martin-de-la-Cluze decided to acquire Gilioli's house and workshop, respecting the expressed wish of his wife Babet to create a space dedicated to the artist's memory. In 2004, the workshop/house was turned into a museum/library which hosts a permanent exhibition presenting Gilioli's work.

Also in 1997, the Musée Maillol organised an exhibition in his honor from 27 February to 15 May.

== Large-scale works ==
- 1946 : Voreppe Memorial;
- 1950 : Monument to the dead for those deported from Grenoble;
- 1951 : Monument at Chapelle-en-Vercors;
- 1952 : Gisant at Vassieux-en-Vercors;
- 1968 : Fountain at the hôtel de ville;
- 1973 : Memorial to the Résistance on the Glières Plateau (Haute-Savoie).

== Museums displaying Gilioli's works ==
=== In France ===
- Atelier Gilioli – espace muséographique et bibliothèque, 38650 Saint Martin de la Cluze;
- Musée de Peinture et de Sculpture, Grenoble;
- Centre Georges-Pompidou, Paris;
- Musée National d'Art Moderne, Paris;
- Musée de Sculpture de la Ville, Paris;
- Musée de la Sculpture en plein air, Paris;
- Musée des Beaux-Arts, Dunkerque;
- Musée Fabre, Montpellier;
- Musée des Beaux-Arts de Rouen.

=== Other countries ===
- Tate Gallery in London;
- Museum of Open Air Sculpture, Antwerp;
- São Paulo Museum of Modern Art;
- Museum of Modern Art, New York;
- Bezalel Museum, Jerusalem;
- Museum of Fine Arts, Ostend;
- National Museum of History and Art, Luxembourg;
- Museo de Bellas Artes, Caracas;
- Museo dei Bozzetti, Pietrasanta;
- Kunsthaus, Zurich.
