= Guard (Vichy France) =

Military force in Vichy France

- La Garde
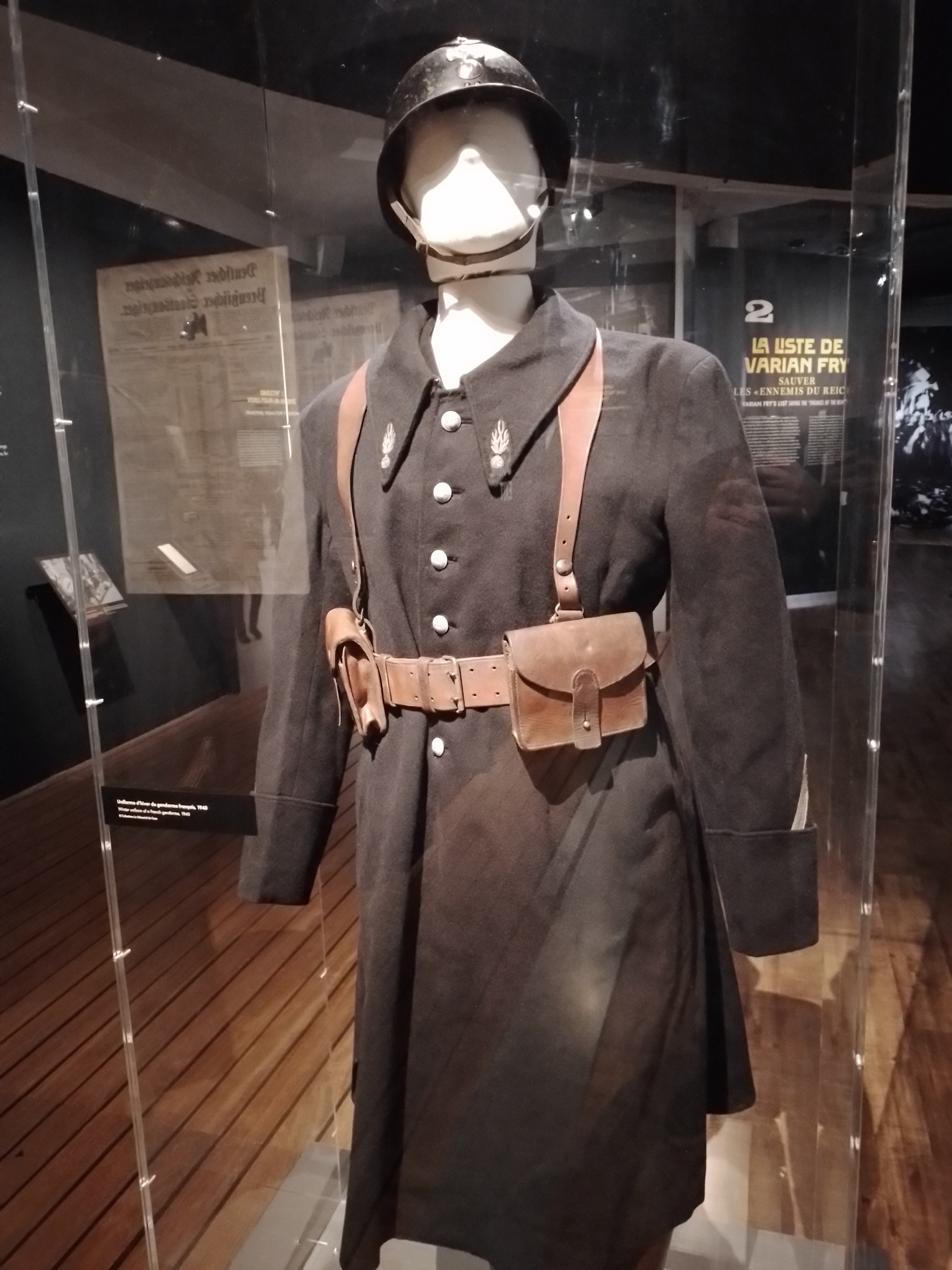
- Uniform of a Guardsman in 1940–1941 (from the Mémorial de Caen)
- Active: November 1940 – 14 January 1945
- Country: Vichy France
- Engagements: World War II

The Guard (French: La Garde) was a military force in Vichy France, created from the Mobile Republican Guard after it was dissolved in November 1940. It is now the modern Mobile Gendarmerie.

The Guard should not be confused with the new units created by the government of Vichy France, notably the Groupes mobiles de réserve (GMR) that belonged to the National Police (whose postwar successor were the Compagnies Républicaines de Sécurité) or with the Garde du Maréchal (which were part of the National Gendarmerie).

== History ==
=== Background ===
The Mobile Republican Guard (MRG) was created in 1921. It had reached a strength of 21,000 men in 1940, with as many as 5,000 of them being captured during the Battle of France. The conditions of the Armistice of 22 June 1940 limited France's Armistice Army to 100,000 soldiers in Metropolitan France affected the Gendarmerie, which was also part of the Army. Only 6,000 gendarmes were permitted.

=== Creation and organisation ===
The MRG was detached from the Departmental Gendarmerie by Marshal Pétain's decree of 17 November 1940. The MRG passed from the Gendarmerie to the Direction of the Cavalry, the Train and the Guard in the Armistice Army by ministerial decree of 25 November 1940. Due to this change, the Guard's companies became squadrons.

A part of the MRG's staff was transferred to the Departmental Gendarmerie while another part - 6,000 men - were formed into a new organization in the Zone libre: the Guard. Initially, the MRG was split into two groups, each of which consisted of three legions. On 12 September 1942, the order is issued that each of the legions of the Guard becomes a regiment of the Guard as of October 16. The six regiments formed two brigades. Each regiment had 2 groups of 4 squadrons (1 motorcyclist, 1 mounted and 2 motorized). Each squadron was supposed to have 122 officers and non-commissioned officers. The regiments were distributed throughout Vichy France, with a guard training school located in Guéret:

Guard Regiment	Location
1st	Lyon
2nd	Marseille
3rd	Montpellier
4th	Riom
5th	Limoges
6th	Toulouse

In French North Africa, where there already existed a legion of MRG, three legions - later regiments - of the Guard were created:

Guard Regiment	Location
7th	Algiers
8th	Tunis
9th	Rabat

All of which combined were a total of about 3,000 men.

After the invasion of the Free Zone on 11 November 1942, the Armistice Army was dissolved. However, the Guard was attached to the Ministry of the Interior. The fact that the Guard used to be part of the army meant that it was distrusted by the Vichy government.

Some members of the Guard took part in the Battle of Glières in early 1944. As the situation for Vichy France worsened throughout 1944, many from the Guard deserted to the French Resistance.

By decree of 23 August 1944, the Guard took the name of Republican Guard. It was re-attached to the gendarmerie from September 10, the merger of personnel being completed by a decree of 14 January 1945.

=== High-ranking officers ===
On 7 April 1944, General Jean-Paul Perré was appointed general manager by decree No.1033. He was sentenced by the Poitiers Court of Justice in 1946.

From 1943, Lieutenant-Colonel Robelin, Technical Deputy Director of the Guard, prepared to join the French Resistance. He was in contact with Paul Paillole and the BCRA. However, he was arrested in July 1944 by the Gestapo, was tortured and then assassinated, his body never to be found. The 1962-1963 class of the École des officiers de la gendarmerie nationale bore his name.

== Bibliography ==
- Cazals, Claude (1997). La Garde sous Vichy (in French). Les Éditions La Musse.
- Cullen, Stephen (2018). World War II Vichy French Security Troops. Men-at-Arms. Osprey Publishing. ISBN 9781472827753.
