= 4th Armored Division (France, 1940) =

- 4e division cuirassée
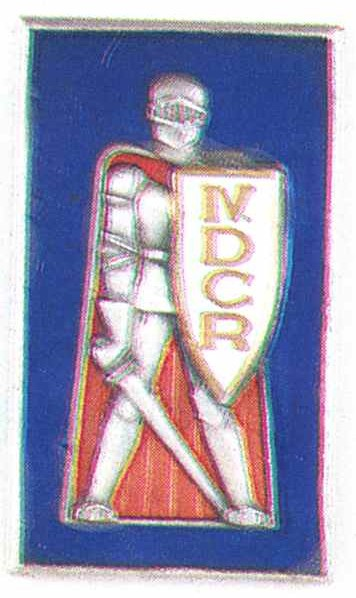
- Insignia of the division
- Active: 10 May 1940 – 26 June 1940
- Country: France
- Type: Armored
- Engagements: Second World War: Battle of Montcornet; Battle of Abbeville

Commanders
- Notable commanders: Charles de Gaulle; Pierre Jules de la Font

The 4th Armored Division (French: 4e Division cuirassée (4e DCr)) was a short-lived armoured unit of the French Army. Formed on 10 May 1940 on the battlefield, it comprised mainly tank battalions. It fought without interruption for forty days and was initially commanded by Charles de Gaulle.

== Battle of France ==
=== Formation ===
The division was formed under Colonel De Gaulle on 10 May 1940.

=== Fighting the Blitzkrieg ===
The 4DCr launched an attack on 17 May at the Battle of Montcornet, where it successfully threw back the German defenses but had to retreat on its starting positions for lack of support and air cover. It then moved south of Abbeville to attack German bridgeheads across the Aisne river, fighting the Battle of Abbeville on 28/29 May with the aim of breaking through to the encircled Allied units trapped in Dunkirk.

On 1 June, the 4e DCr was relieved by the 51st (Highland) Infantry Division and regrouped at Marseille-en-Beauvaisis to attach itself to the armoured group under General Charles Delestraint. On 6 June, De Gaulle was relieved of his command to rejoin his new commission as State under-secretary for War in the government. De Gaulle was replaced by Colonel Chaudesolle for one day. General Pierre Jules de la Font took command of the division on 7 June.

On 10 June, the armoured group was attached to the Paris Army, and on 12 June, the division was assigned to the 10th Army Corps. From then on, it took part in rear-guard fights during the retreat, notably on the Loire river from 12 to 19 June, and until the cease-fire on 26 June.

== Composition ==
The division was composed of the following units:

- 46^{e} bataillon de chars de combat
- 19^{e} bataillon de chars de combat
- 4^{e} bataillon de chasseurs portés
- 24^{e} bataillon de chars de combat
- 303^{e} régiment d'artillerie tractée
- 4^{e} groupe autonome d'artillerie
- 322^{e} RATTT / 1^{er} groupe (from 17 May)
- 322^{e} RATTT / 2^{e} groupe (from 17 May)
- 10^{e} régiment de cuirassiers - One squadron equipped with the Panhard 178 (from 18 May)
- 3^{e} cuirassiers / 1^{er} groupe d'escadron - One squadron equipped with SOMUA S35 tanks (from 18 May)
- 10/80^{e} BDAC (from 20 May)
- 11/86^{e} BDAC (from 20 May)
- 47^{e} bataillon de chars de combat (from 21 May)
- 44^{e} bataillon de chars de combat (from 21 May)
- 1020^{e} batterie, 404^{e} DCA (from 23 May)
- 305^{e} RATTT / 1^{er} groupe (105) (from 23 May)
- 2^{e} bataillon du 7^{e} régiment de dragons portés (from 24 May)
- 3^{e} cuirassiers / 2^{e} groupe d'escadron - One squadron equipped with Hotchkiss H35 tanks (from 25 May)
- 665^{e} batterie divisionnaire antichar (from 25 May)
- 51^{e} batterie antichar autonome (from 25 May)
- 661^{e} batterie divisionnaire antichar (from 28 May)

== Equipment ==
The division was equipped with the following vehicles:

- 58 Char B1bis heavy tanks
- 44 Char D2 medium tanks
- 135 SOMUA S35 medium tanks
- 40 Hotchkiss H39 light tanks
- 48 Panhard 178 armoured cars

== Bibliography ==
- Lormier, Dominique (2008). Comme des lions - mai juin 1940 - Le sacrifice héroïque de l'armée française (in French). Calmann-Lévy. ISBN 978-2-7021-3445-0.
- Vauvillier, François (2007–2008). La division cuirassée en 1940 et ses perspectives. Histoire de guerre, blindés et matériels (in French).
