= 7th Military Division (Vichy France) =

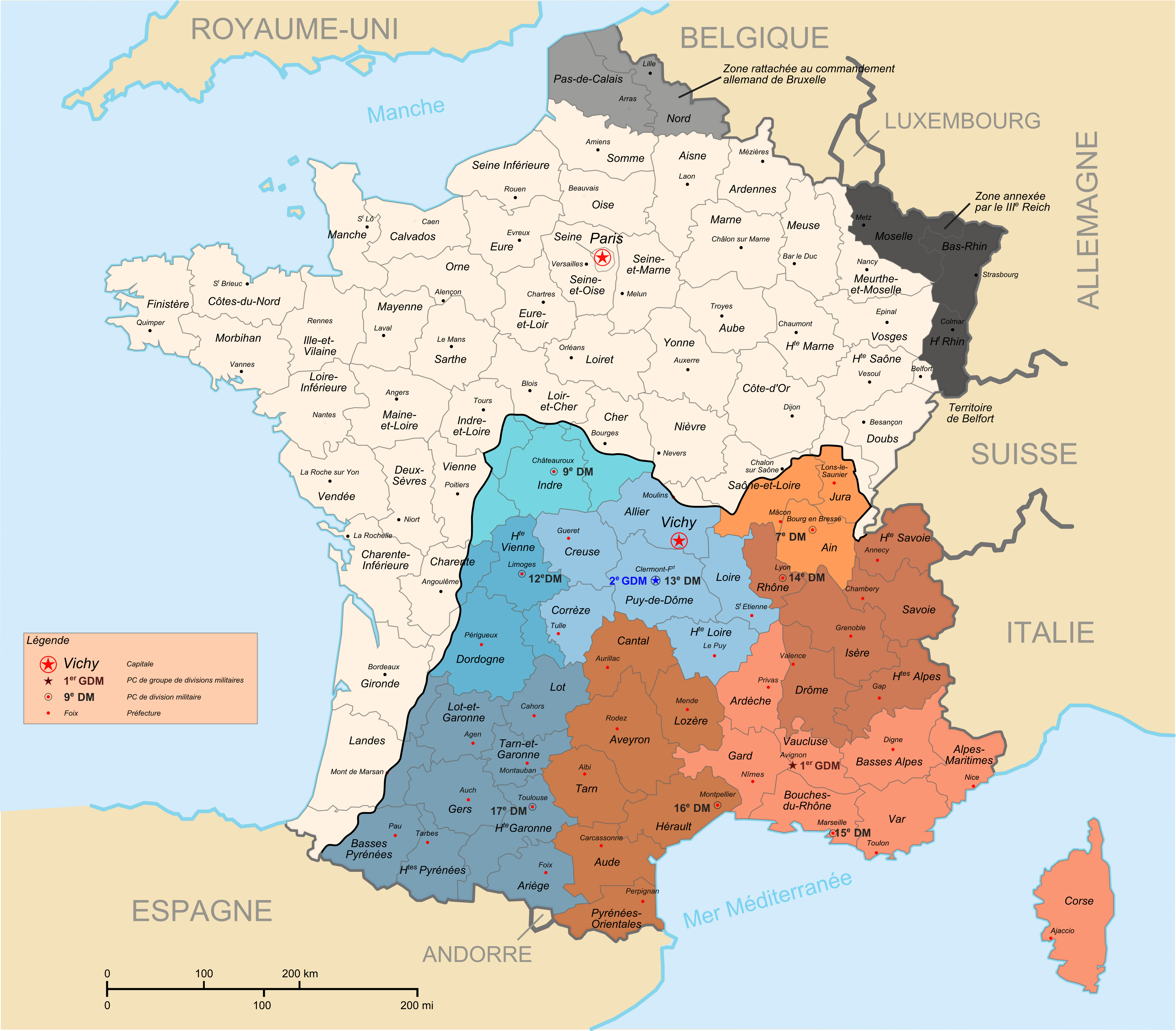
- Military Divisions of the Vichy Army. The 7th Division can be seen in the top right in orange.
- Active: 12 September 1940 – 27 November 1942; 2 years, 2 months
- Country: (France) French State
- Branch: (France) Army of the Armistice
- Type: Military regional command
- Size: Division
- Part of: 1st Group of Military Divisions
- Divisional HQ: Bourg-en-Bresse

The 7th Military Division (French: 7ème Division Militaire) was a regional army division of the Armistice Army, the Vichy France military permitted under the Armistice of 22 June 1940 after the defeat of France.

== History ==
Under the terms of the Armistice of 22 June 1940, the old French Third Republic was disestablished, and with it, its lands were divided. In Northern France and Western France, the Wehrmacht took direct control of the country while the central and Southern regions were controlled by a new nation, Vichy France. The new nation was limited in the size of its armed forces, so a reorganisation of the region was ordered. The 1st Group of Military Divisions was formed in Avignon and covered the eastern parts of the country, while the 2nd Group covered the west. The 7th Division encompassed the unoccupied portions of the departments of Jura, Saône-et-Loire, as well as all of Ain.

On 12 September 1940, the 7th Military Division was stood up under command of Major General Louis Albert Pierre Robert de Saint Vincent (former Deputy Commander, 14th Military Division). Later that year he was replaced by Major General Maxime Jean Vincent Germain, and in the same year replaced by Major General Marie Alphonse Théodore René Adrian Desmazes, and replaced again by Major General Louis-Marie-Joseph-Ferdinand Keller. In 1941, Keller was replaced by either Major General Pierre-Louis-Charles-Constance Hanoteau or Major General Jean-Marie-Léon Etcheberrigaray. In 1941, Major General Pierre Jules André Marie de La Font Chabert took command of the division, and following Case Anton himself and the division was demobilised on 27 November 1942.

== Organisation ==
By 15 April 1941, the 7th Military Division was under the command of one of the two corps sized regional commands, the 1st Group of Military Division based in Avignon. The below structure is that of the division on the division mentioned beforehand.

- Headquarters, 7th Military Division, in Bourg-en-Bresse
  - 8th Group, (Note: The term 'group' is used for support units, though equivalent to that of battalion.) 7th Signal Regiment, in Bourg-en-Bresse
  - 5th Dragoon Regiment (8 x AMD Panhard 178), in Mâcon – (mounted, no motor transport)
  - 65th Infantry Regiment, in Bourg-en-Bresse – HQ and 1st Battalion
    - 2nd Battalion, in Sathonay-Camp
    - 3rd Battalion, in Mâcon
  - 151st Infantry Regiment, in Lons-le-Saunier (HQ + 3 x battalions)
  - 4th Chasseurs à Pied Demi-Brigade, in Belley – HQ and 1st Chasseur Battalion
    - 2nd Chasseurs à Pied battalion, in Jujurieux
    - 10th Chasseurs à Pied battalion, in Neuville-sur-Ain and at the Camp de Thol
  - 61st Artillery Regiment, in Valbonne (Field Artillery, 36 x Canon de 75 modèle 1897) – (HQ + 3 x battalions)
  - 10th Engineer Battalion, in Valbonne
  - 7th Transportation Group, in Bourg-en-Bresse
  - 4th Regiment, (Note: The term 'regiment' is used for the Guard Legion (Gendarmerie), though equivalent to that of a battalion.) 1st Guard Legion, in Saint-Maurice-de-Beynost
  - Valbonne Training Grounds
  - Saône-et-Loire Departmental Command
    - Charolles District Command
    - Louhans District Command
  - Ain Departmental Command
    - Nantua District Command
  - Jura Departmental Command
    - Lons-le-Saunier District Command
    - Saint-Claude District Command

== Footnotes ==
Notes

Citations
