= Groupe mobile de réserve =

WWII French Vichy paramilitary units

The Groupes mobiles de réserve (transl. mobile reserve groups), abbreviated as GMR, were paramilitary gendarmerie units created by the Vichy regime during the Second World War. Their development was the special task of René Bousquet, Vichy director-general of the French national police.

== History ==
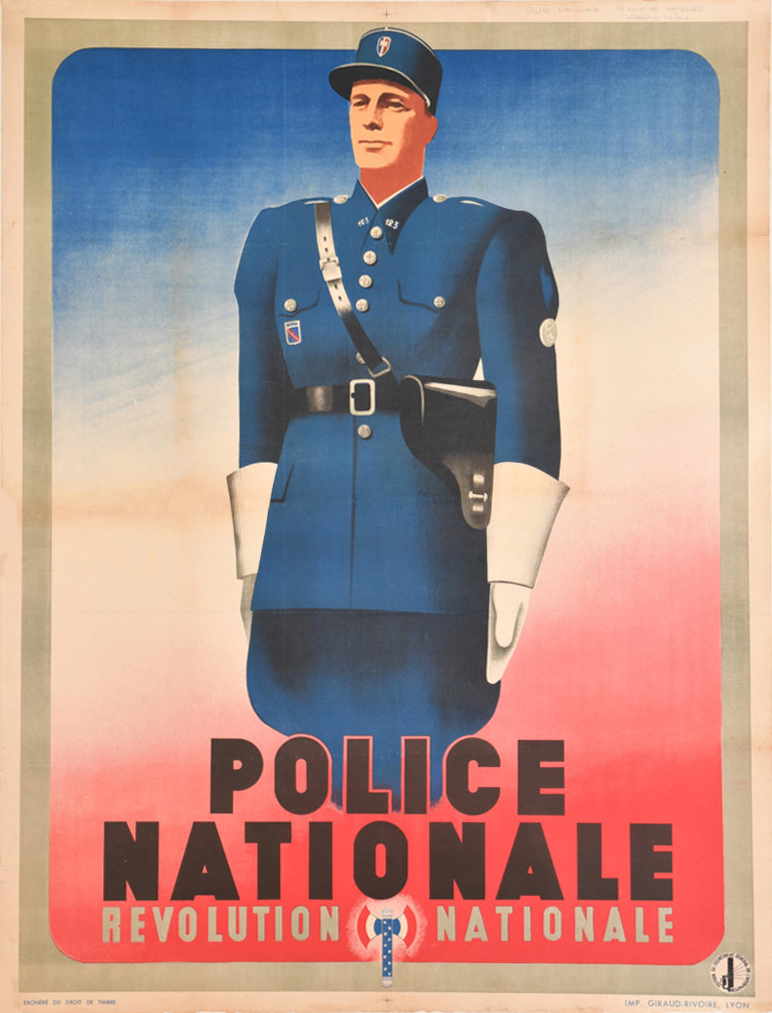
Propaganda poster for the Vichy regime's National Police, to which the GMR units belonged

The GMR was conceived at the time as a prefiguration of the renewal of the Vichy French Army, limited to 100,000 men by the armistice with Germany, and as a force to maintain order along the lines of the Gendarmerie mobile. Since they were affiliated with the national police, they did not have military status, thereby formally respecting the terms of the armistice.

The numbers of the Garde Mobile had been reduced along with the army by the dictats of the armistice. To tackle the perceived need of maintaining order in the country, a law was passed on 23 April 1941 creating the GMR. According to a subsequent decree of 7 July, these units would be attached to the regional public security forces and answerable to the police intendant, a position established by law on 19 April 1941, under the authority of the regional prefect. These police units were assembled in the zone libre from autumn 1941 onward, and deployed throughout occupied France by the end of 1942. The law of 17 April established a GMT central leadership, and, regionally, area instructions. This civil paramilitary force was originally envisaged to maintain order in an urban setting; however, from the autumn of 1943, it began participating involved in actions against the Resistance, in which it often proved more zealous than the Garde Mobile.

A GMR unit, led by a commandant (from a guardian of the peace), comprised at most 220 officers, and was divided into four sections commanded mainly by officers of the peace and themselves divided into four brigades.

From autumn 1943 onwards, the GMR took part in offensives launched by the Vichy government against maquis formations, with the consent of the Germans. They fought in the Massif Central and took part as an auxiliary force in the fighting against the Glières Maquis. During operations against the Maquis du Vercors, the GMR stationed themselves at the foot of the massif to prevent access. The main responsibility for larger-scale military actions fell on the German army, with the auxiliary participation by the Milice.

In contrast to the departmental police, the GMR was not recruited from the heart of the local population. Thus, they had no reason to seek the same type of the tacit modus vivendi which often existed between the maquis and local law enforcement. Insofar as can be judged from witnesses and historians, they did not show particular scruples during these campaigns of repression, even after taking into account defections among them in the summer of 1944.

After the country's liberation of 8 December 1944, the GMR were dissolved, and a part of them were merged, after épuration, i.e. its ostensible purging of collaborators, with elements from the French Forces of the Interior to create the Compagnies républicaines de sécurité (CRS).

== Ranks ==
GMR was a branch of the Vichy National Police and wore its uniforms and rank insignia.

Rank	Rank insignia 1941-1944
Commandant des Gardiens de la Paix principal de 1re classe	
Commandant des Gardiens de la Paix principal de 2e classe	
Commandant des Gardiens de la Paix de 1re classe	
Commandant des Gardiens de la Paix de 2e classe	
Commandant des Gardiens de la Paix de 3e classe	
Commandant des Gardiens de la Paix de 4e classe	
Officier de Paix principal	
Officier de Paix hors classe	
Officier de Paix de 1re classe	
Brigadier-chef de 1re classe	
Brigadier-chef de 2e classe	
Brigadier de 1re classe	
Brigadier de 2e classe	
Gardien de la Paix	

== Bibliography ==
- Alain Pinel, Une police de Vichy – Les Groupes Mobiles de Réserve, (1941-1944), Préface by Philippe Braud, L'Harmattan, coll. Sécurité et société, Paris, 2004.
- Alain Pinel, Histoire de la Police, du Moyen Âge à nos jours, Robert Laffont, coll. Bouquins, 2005, pp. 703–707.
- Stephen M. Cullen, Mark Stacey, World War II Vichy French Security Troops, Osprey Publishing, 2018.
- Yves Mathieu, Policiers perdus - Les GMR dans la Seconde Guerre mondiale, Messages SAS, Toulouse, 2009.
