= Chaourse =

- Commune
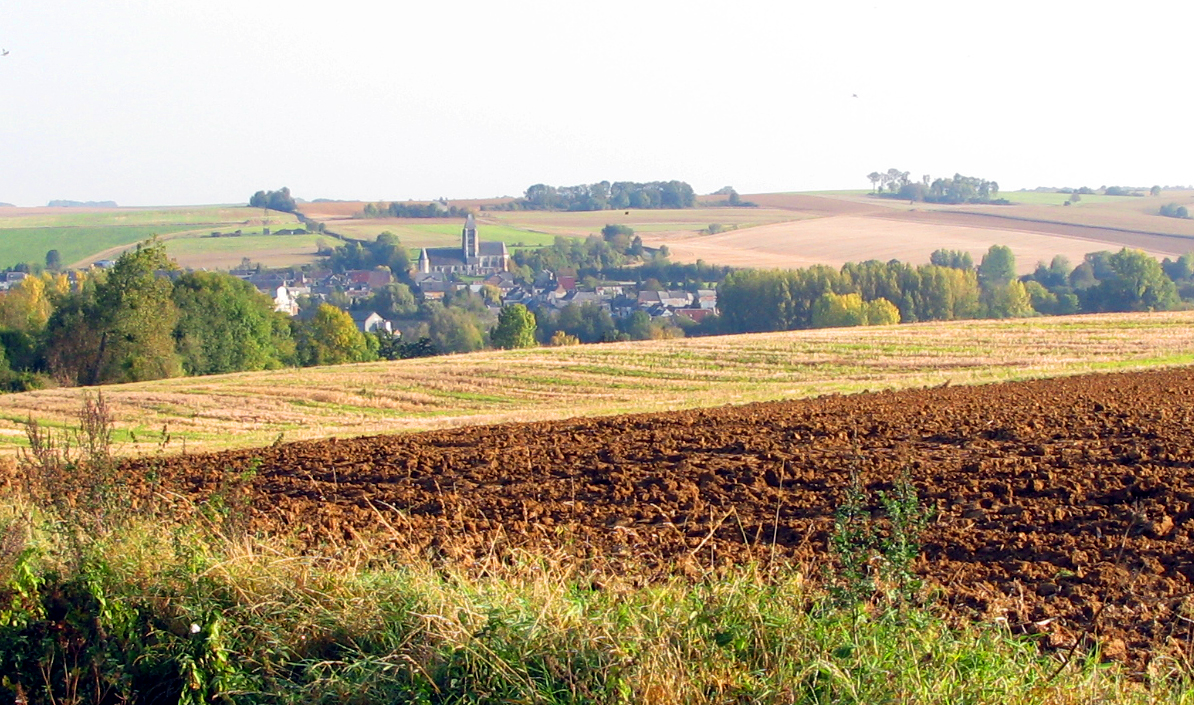
- A general view of Chaourse
- Location of Chaourse
- Location within France Location within Hauts-de-France
- Coordinates: 49°42′18″N 3°59′54″E
- Country: France
- Region: Hauts-de-France
- Department: Aisne
- Arrondissement: Vervins
- Canton: Vervins
- Intercommunality: Portes de la Thiérache

Government
  - Mayor (2026–32): Sylvain Dupont
- Area^{1}: 18.6 km^{2} (7.2 sq mi)
- Elevation: 110 m (360 ft)
- Highest elevation: 187 m (614 ft)
- Lowest elevation: 102 m (335 ft)
- Population (2023): 495
  - Density: 26.6/km^{2} (68.9/sq mi)
- Time zone: UTC+01:00 (CET)
  - Summer (DST): UTC+02:00 (CEST)
- INSEE/Postal code: 02160 /02340
- ^{1} French Land Register data, which excludes lakes, ponds, glaciers > 1 km^{2} (0.386 sq mi or 247 acres) and river estuaries.

Chaourse is a commune in the Aisne department in Hauts-de-France in northern France. The famous Chaourse Treasure of Roman artefacts, now in the British Museum, was found in the village in 1883.

== Population ==
Historical population
Year	Pop.	±% p.a.
1968	769	—
1975	629	−2.83%
1982	551	−1.87%
1990	522	−0.67%
1999	522	+0.00%
2007	552	+0.70%
2012	526	−0.96%
2017	539	+0.49%
2023	495	−1.41%
Source: INSEE

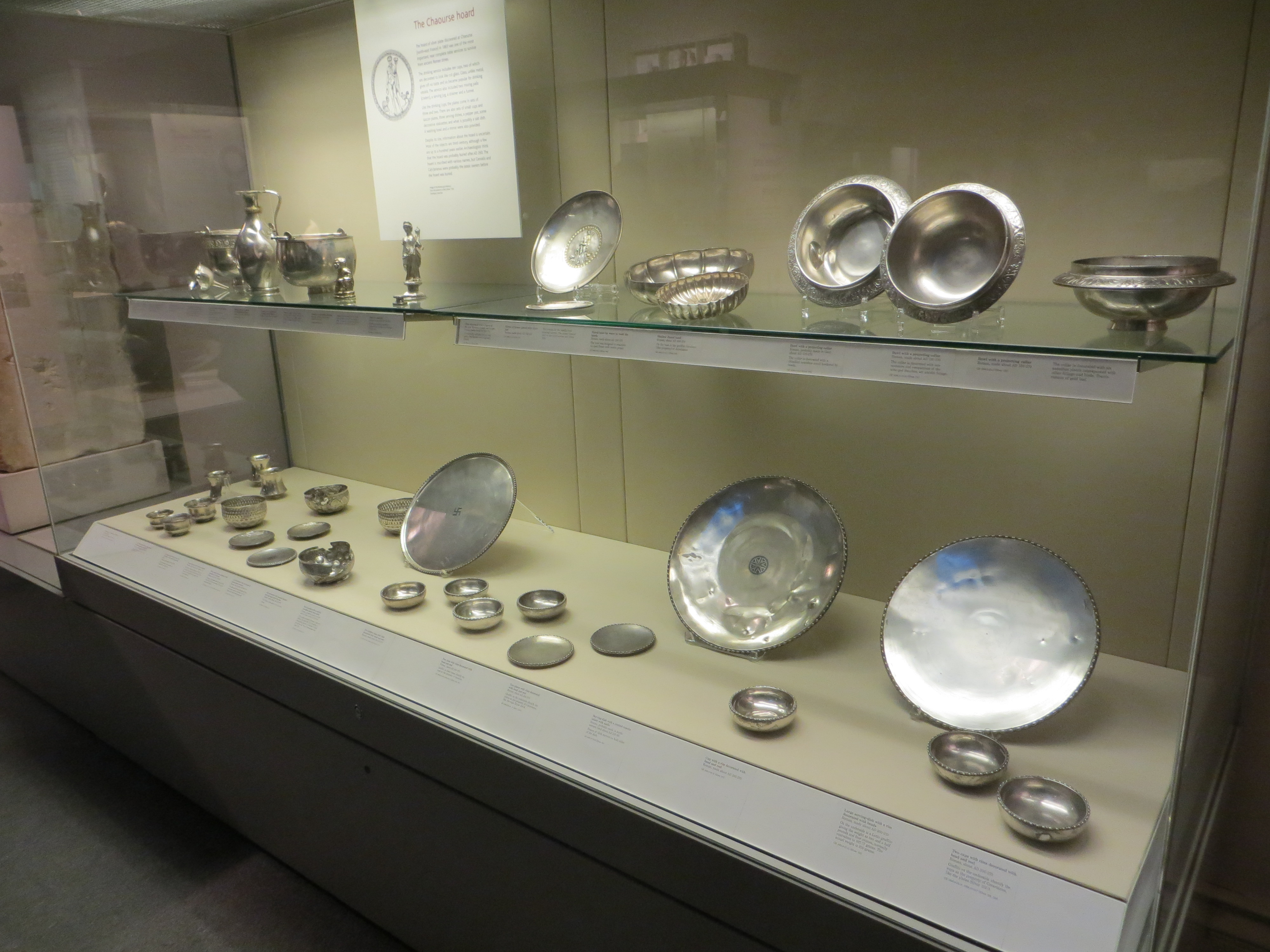
The Chaourse Treasure in the British Museum

== See also ==
- Communes of the Aisne department
