= Armistice Army =

Armed forces of Vichy France (1940–42)

- Armée de l'Armistice
- The flag of Vichy France.
- Active: 1940–1942
- Disbanded: 27 November 1942
- Country: Vichy France
- Allegiance: Government of Vichy France
- Branch: Army
- Type: Infantry; Motorised Infantry; Mechanised Infantry; Cavalry; Light Artillery; Light Armour
- Role: Defense
- Size: 550,000 men (1942)
- Main Headquarters: Vichy
- Engagements: Battle of Dakar; Japanese invasion of French Indochina; Battle of Gabon; Franco-Thai War; Syria-Lebanon campaign; Battle of Madagascar; Battle of Réunion; Operation Torch

Commanders
- Chief of State: Philippe Petain
- Notable commanders: Maxime Weygand; Charles Huntziger

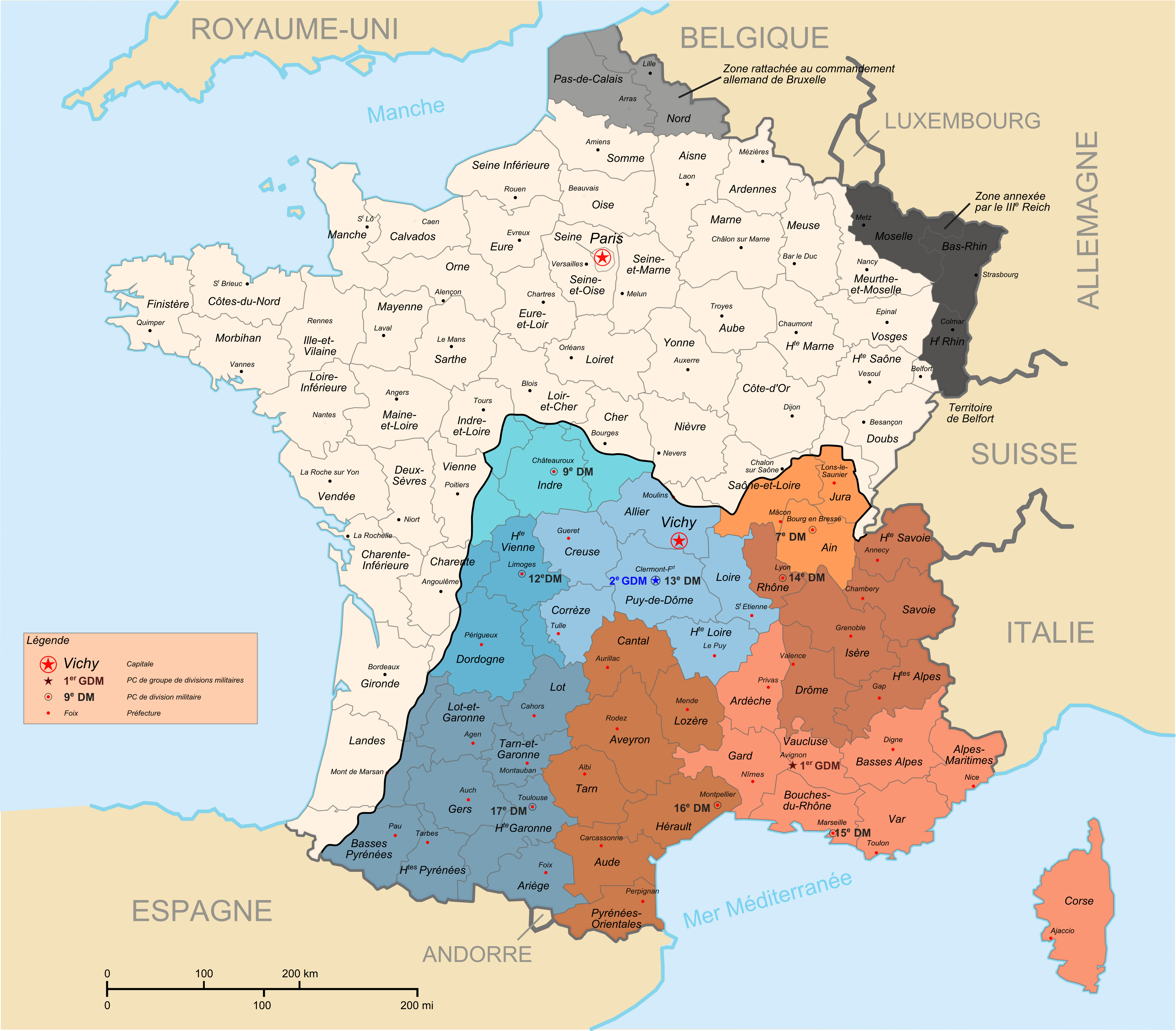
Military divisions of Vichy's Armistice Army during the period 1940-1942

The Armistice Army (French: Armée de l'Armistice) was the armed forces of Vichy France permitted under the terms of the Armistice of 22 June 1940. It was officially disbanded in 1942 after the German invasion of the "Free Zone" (Zone libre) which was directly ruled by the Vichy regime.

At the beginning of 1942, the numbers of the Armistice Army reached 550,000 men, including 21,000 officers.

== History ==
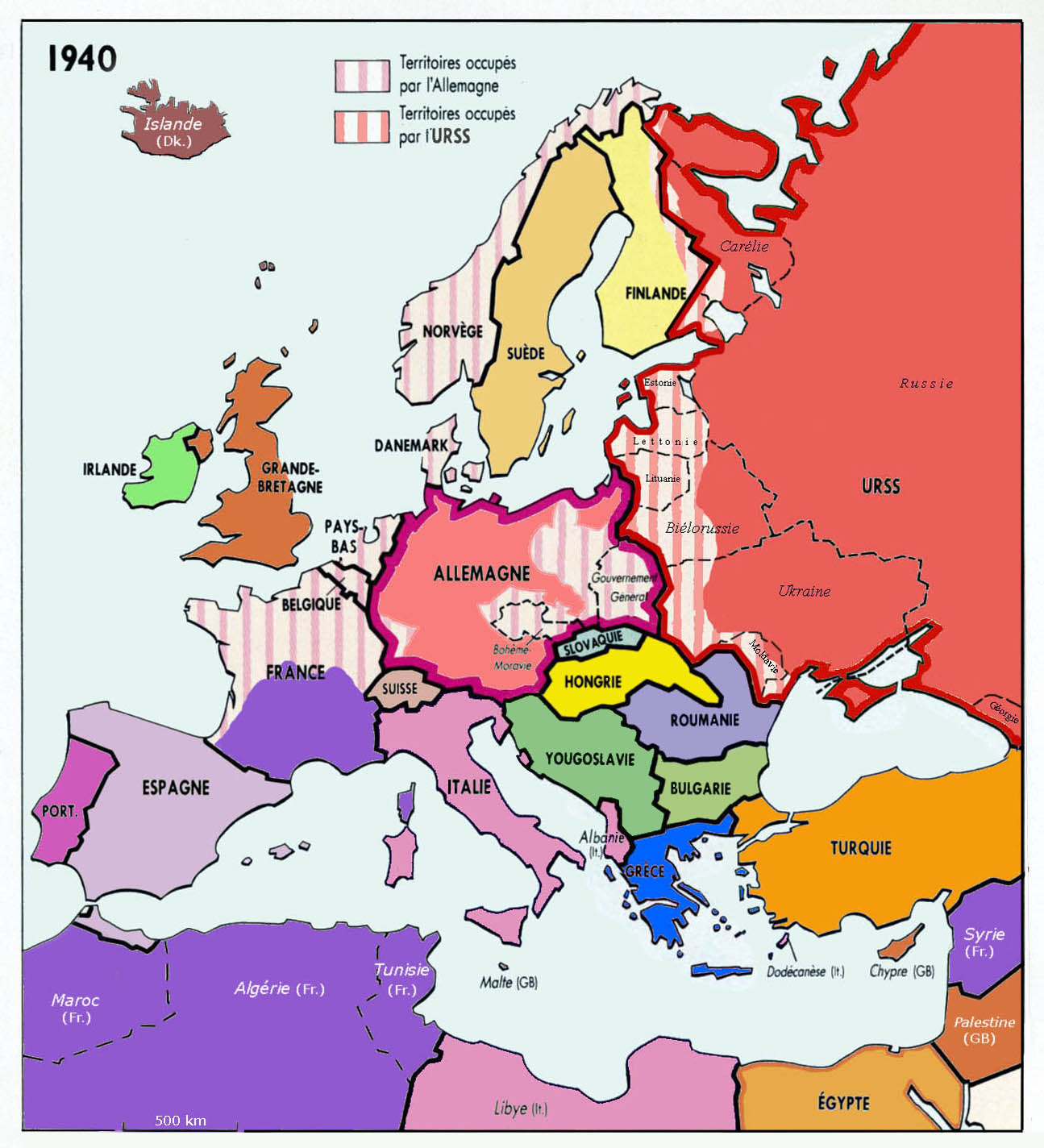
The map clearly shows the division of France as per all the historical realities of the era: Nazi Germany annexed Alsace Lorraine, and occupied northern metropolitan France and all the Atlantic coastline down to the border with Spain. That left the rest of France, including the remaining two-fifths of southern and eastern metropolitan France and Overseas France North Africa, unoccupied, and under the control of a collaborationist French government based at the city of Vichy, and headed by Marshal Philippe Pétain.

Article IV of the Armistice of 22 June 1940 allowed for a small French army — the Army of the Armistice (Armée de l'Armistice) — stationed in the Zone libre (Unoccupied France), and the French colonial empire overseas. It was headed by Marshal Philippe Pétain, hero of World War I. The function of these forces was to keep internal order and to defend French territories from Allied assault. The French forces were to remain under the overall direction of the German armed forces.

The Armistice Army was a limited force, created in July 1940, following the occupation of metropolitan France by Germany. The northern part of the metropolitan territory was occupied from June 1940 to November 1942 as a consequence of the Armistice, then, full metropolitan territory as a consequence of the Allied invasion of French North Africa (Operation Torch) and the Allied allegiance of the colonial French Army of Africa. Besides its limited regular army, the French State created irregular forces to fight the French Resistance and the communists; both considered enemies by Vichy and the German authorities.

The exact strength of the Vichy French Metropolitan Army was set at 3,768 officers, 15,072 non-commissioned officers, and 75,360 men. All members had to be volunteers. In addition to the army, the size of the Gendarmerie was fixed at 60,000 men plus an anti-aircraft force of 10,000 men. Despite the influx of trained soldiers from the colonial forces (reduced in size under the Armistice), there was a shortage of volunteers. As a result, 30,000 men of the class of 1939 were retained to fill the quota. At the beginning of 1942, these conscripts were released, but there were still not enough men. This shortage remained until the dissolution, despite Vichy appeals to the Germans for a regular form of conscription.

The Vichy French Metropolitan Army was deprived of tanks and other armoured vehicles and was desperately short of motorised transport, a particular problem for cavalry units. Surviving recruiting posters stress the opportunities for athletic activities, including horsemanship, reflecting both the general emphasis placed by the Vichy government on rural virtues and outdoor activities and the realities of service in a small and technologically backward military force. Traditional features characteristic of the pre-1940 French Army, such as kepis and heavy capotes (buttoned-back greatcoats) were replaced by berets and simplified uniforms.

The Vichy authorities did not deploy the Army of the Armistice against resistance groups active in the south of France, reserving this role to the Vichy Milice (militia), a paramilitary force created on 30 January 1943 by the Vichy government to combat the Resistance; thus, members of the regular army could defect to the Maquis after the German occupation of southern France and the disbandment of the Army of the Armistice in November 1942. By contrast, the Milice continued to collaborate and its members were subject to reprisals after the Liberation.

Vichy French colonial forces were reduced following the terms of the Armistice. Yet Clayton writes that German aims in Africa were in 1940 best served by continued French administration rather than intrusions by Spain or Italy. Thus the French secured an agreement for the continuation of the Army of Africa at a strength of 100,000, plus 20,000 military workers for North Africa. The permitted totals were increased in February and April 1941, after which the force reached 127,000 plus 16,000 goumiers. In French West Africa the initial total was 33,000, made up of Tirailleurs, an artillery group, a cavalry regiment, and logistics units.

Forces elsewhere included almost 40,000 in the Army of the Levant (Armée du Levant), in Lebanon and Syria. Colonial forces were allowed to keep some armoured vehicles, though these were mostly obsolescent World War I Renault FT tanks.

== Dissolution of forces in Metropolitan France ==
After the Allied invasion of French North Africa (Operation Torch) began, Adolf Hitler ordered the dissolution of the Armistice Army in mainland France on 26 November 1942. Some staff officers clung to the possibility suggested by Hitler to form an army of a new form. On December 23, Hitler finally put an end to this hope by declaring that "the creation of a new French Army [...] is out of the question." The discovery of illegal arms stores had greatly undermined the confidence of the Germans in the French authorities. A deadline of 23 January 1943 was imposed on the French Government: after this date, the commanders of the military regions involved were to be held personally liable. Throughout 1943, a continual stream of active officers passed through Spain to North Africa; Some 12,000 civil or military personnel headed for North Africa.

Despite the German Army's loss of confidence, resulting from the discovery of the camouflaged weapons depots, General Eugène Bridoux, who retained the title of Secretary of State for War, continued his efforts to reconstitute dependent armed units. But Marshal Gerd von Rundstedt refused, and the African Phalange was never to have any connections with a French military organization. Pierre Laval did obtain from Hitler in Berchtesgaden, on April 30, 1943, the permission to create a small military force. The law was promulgated on 15 July 1943 and, on 23 July, Bridoux still managed to form the First Regiment of France composed of three battalions of infantry and cavalry on horseback and bicycle. Designed to maintain traditions, the First Regiment took part in engagements against the Resistance; it eventually became part of the French Forces of the Interior.

== Structure ==
The Vichy French Army was made up of 1 GMD, 2 GMD, North African and Indochina forces, and separately administered direct-controlled units:

=== 1st Group of Military Divisions ===
The 1st Group of Military Divisions was formed in September 1940. Its headquarters was at Avignon. The corps was disbanded in 1942 when Operation Anton was launched and Vichy France was diminished. The 1st Military Corps had overall control of the divisions that were in South France and Southeast France. It notably participated in Operation Dragoon (alongside the German Army). Although the corps itself never saw full combat units part of it saw action in both Operation Torch in North Africa and The Syria–Lebanon Campaign.

The organization of the corps in 1941 included:

==== 7th Military Division ====
7th Military Division
- Active: 9 December 1940 – November 1942
- Disbanded: 1942
- Type: Infantry
- Role: Artillery observer Border checkpoint Counterinsurgency; Indirect fire Internal security Maneuver warfare Military engineering Mountain warfare Patrolling; Raiding; Reconnaissance; Security checkpoint Urban warfare
- Size: Division
- Headquarters: Bourg-en-Bresse

The division controlled units in East France, notably on the Swiss border.

The 7th Military Division was organized in September 1940 under Major General Pierre Robert de Saint-Vincent. In November 1942 the division was de-mobilised. In addition to the division controlling military units, it also supervised the areas of the 1st Military District and 2nd Military District in addition to a security squadron and training grounds.

The structure of the division in 1941 included (names in English and French):

- Deputy Commander, 7th Military Division
  - Infantry Commander, 7th Military Division (Commandement d'Infanterie)
    - 4th Chasseurs Demi-Brigade (4e Demi-brigade de Chasseurs)
      - 1er Bataillon de Chasseurs -
      - 2e Bataillon de Chasseurs -
      - 10e Bataillon de Chasseurs -
    - 65e Régiment d'Infanterie - (65th Infantry Regiment)
    - 151e Régiment d'Infanterie - (151st Infantry Regiment)
  - 61e Régiment d'Artillerie - (61st Artillery Regiment)
  - 5e Régiment de Dragons - (5th Dragoon Regiment)
  - 10e Bataillon de Genie - (10th Engineer Battalion)
  - 8/7e Groupe de Transmissions - (8/7th Signals Group)
  - 7e Compagnie du Train - (7th Supply Company)
- Military Command of the Departments (Commandement Militaire de Department)
  - Military Command in Department of Saône-et-Loire (Commandament Militaire de Saune-et-Loire)
  - Military Command in Department of Ain (Commandament Militaire de Ain)
  - Military Command in Department of Jura (Commandament Militaire de Jura)
- Military District Command (Commandement de District Militaire)
  - Command of Military District in Saint-Claude (Commandement de District Militaire Saint-Claude)
  - Command of Military District in Louhans (Commandement de District Militaire Louhans)
  - Command of Military District in Charolles (Commandement de District Militaire Charolles)
  - Command of Military District in South Lons-le-Saunier (Commandement de District Militaire Sud Lons-le-Saunier)
  - Command of Military District in North Lons-le-Saunier (Commandement de District Militaire Nord Lons-le-Saunier)
- Valbonne Training Grounds (Terrain d'entraînement de Valbonne) (Valbonne)
- 4th Squadron, 1st Legion Guard (4e Escadron du 1er Garde de la Légion)

==== 14th Military Division ====
The division was organized in September 1940 under Lieutenant General Alfred-Marie-Joseph-Louis Montagne. In November 1942 the division dispersed. In addition to the division controlling field units it also supervised military districts in addition to a security squadron and training grounds.

==== Other corps formations ====
- 15th Military Division
- 16th Military Division
- 1st General Reserve Cavalry Brigade
- 12th Air-Defense Group
- 13th Air-Defense Group
- 14th Air-Defense Group

=== 2nd Group of Military Divisions ===
  - Chief of Staff, 2nd Corps
    - 9th Military Division
    - 12th Military Division
    - 13th Military Division
    - 17th Military Division
    - 2nd General Reserve Cavalry Brigade

=== Commander-in-Chief, North Africa Theater ===
- XIX Military Region
  - Algiers Division
  - Constantine Division
  - Oran Division
- Commander of Troops in Tunisia
  - 4th Regiment of Zouaves (Tunis)
  - 4th Tunisian Tirailleurs (Sousse and Gabes)
  - 43rd Colonial Infantry Regiment (Bizerta)
  - 4th Chasseurs d'Afrique (Tunis)
  - [[4th Tunisian Spahis Regiment|4th Tunisian Spahis]]
  - 62nd African Artillery Regiment
  - Three groups of the 8th Legion de la Garde
- Commander of Troops in Morocco
  - Casablanca Independent Territorial Division
  - Fèz Territorial Division
  - Marrakech Territorial Division
  - Meknès Territorial Division

=== Indochina Army Corps ===
  - Annam Division (later only brigade strength)
  - Cochinshine-Cambodge Division
  - Tonkin Division

== See also ==
- ARL 44 — postwar French tank designed by members of the Armistice Army
- Government Army (Bohemia and Moravia)
- Guard (Vichy France)
- Liberation of France
- Security Battalions (Greece)
- Vichy French Military Division order of battle
- Vichy French Navy
