= Franc-Garde =

- Flag with the Milice's gamma symbol.
- Active: 1943–45
- Country: Vichy France
- Allegiance: Nazi Germany
- Type: Armed militia
- Role: To support the Révolution nationale
- Size: 4000

The Franc-Garde (English: Free Guard) was the armed wing of the French Milice (Militia), operating alone or alongside German forces in major battles against the Maquis from late 1943 to August 1944.

== History ==
The creation of the Franc-Garde was announced on 30 January 1943 and it was deployed on 2 June of the same year in the Calabres camp near Vichy with Jean de Vaugelas serving as its commander. The group promised its volunteers were promised a salary of 3,600 francs. By 1944, the group had swelled to 131, mostly young fighting men. Once it saw action, the Franc-Garde became the most important connecting link to the SS. Some of its members were also documented serving in the 1945 battle of Berlin, taking part in the defense of the city's government district.

The Milice also used the group to recruit volunteers who would serve in the Waffen SS, particularly those that would be deployed in the SS Charlemagne Division. This recruitment earned the Milice light arms that were used within France.

The Franc-Garde, initially confined to the former free zone, had its access formally extended to the former occupied zone as of January 27, 1944. Its stated role was to support the Révolution nationale undertaken by the Vichy government, predominantly through policing, but also assisting, inter alia, in the clearing of bombed cities. In the words of Secretary General of the French Militia Joseph Darnand in his keynote address on 30 January 1943, the Franc-Garde should be "technically trained and combat-ready in order to be at all times prepared to maintain order." The Franc-Garde had its own publication: L'assaut (The Assault).

The Franc-Garde consisted of two parts: the permanent Franc-Garde, cantoned and paid, and the Franc-Garde volunteers, who were selected ordinary militiamen and could be mobilized for precise and timely action when summoned.

The first two units were formed on an experimental basis in Lyon and Annecy, the cities where there was the most dissent.

In principle, any intervention by the Free Guard was to be preceded by a verbal or written requisition sent by the prefect to the officer commanding the required unit, but this was not always the case in practice.

In October – November 1944, faced with the advance of allied troops, several thousand militiamen (out of a total of ten- to fifteen-thousand) left France for Germany and Italy. Of those, about 2,500 franc-gardes were declared fit to fight:

- 1800 were sent to the Lager Heuberg camp near the city of Ulm in Germany where they were placed in the 57th SS Infantry Regiment, formed mostly of survivors of the LVF, and in the 58th SS Infantry Regiment formed of survivors of the Sturmbrigade Frankreich, in the context of the 33rd SS Grenadier Division Charlemagne.
- 500 formed an infantry battalion under the direct command of Carus, the naval officer and former chief of staff of the Militia, who went on to fight Italian partisans alongside the RSI fascists in Northern Italy.

== Organization and equipment ==
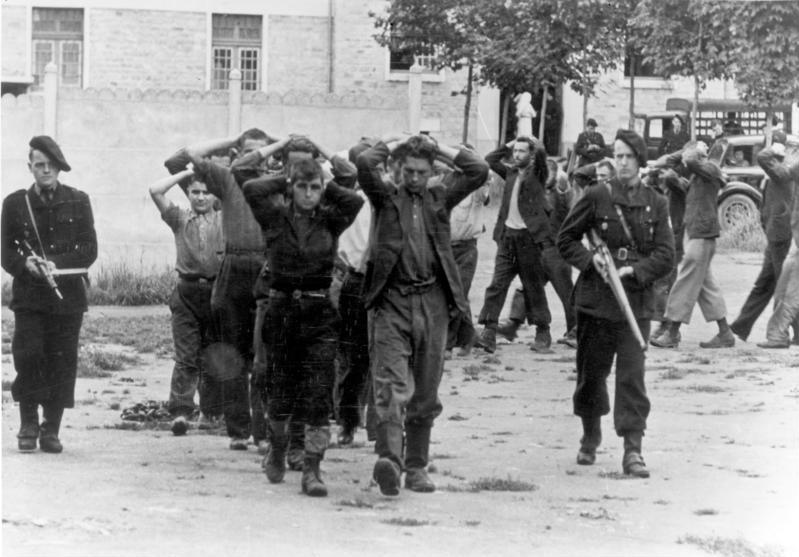
Members of the Resistance captured by the milice.

=== Organization ===
The Franc-Garde consisted of volunteers (typically enrolled after a year's membership in the Militia), aged 18 to 45 years old, living in barracks and paid based on the official salary of a sergeant of the Police National.

- Organisation:
  - main (hand) consisting of a chief and four men;
  - dizaine (ten) (corresponding to a combat group);
  - trentaine (thirty) a small section – in principle at least one in each provincial capital;
  - centaine (hundred) a small company – in principle at least one in each regional capital city. There were two types: "normal" – traveling on foot or bicycle and "mobile" – with motorbikes, cars and trucks;
  - cohorte (cohort) a small battalion of three hundred;
  - centre (center) a small regiment of several cohorts.

The above names did not necessarily correspond to the true size of a unit. For example, the trentaine d'Annecy, which became a centaine, had only 72 men in May 1944. According to the Information Service of the French Committee of National Liberation in February 1944, the Franc-Garde numbered 1687: a cohorte in Vichy, a centaine in Lyon, Marseille and Toulouse, and a trentaine in each of forty-five departments of the south. In any case, even with the mobilization of volunteers in the spring and summer 1944, the Franc-Garde never exceeded 4,000 men.

=== Uniform ===
The Francs-Gardes, the only uniformed militia, adopted the 1941 dark blue Alpine dress uniform ("ski" trousers worn with gaiters and boots, jacket and belt, khaki shirt, black tie, beret tilted to the left).

The symbol of a white Greek letter gamma, on black, was used in a metal badge worn in the right buttonhole and in an embroidered badge on the beret. In combat situations, usually in the fight against the guerrillas, the Franc-Garde might wear an Adrian helmet.

=== Armament ===
Due to the reluctance of the German Army, the Franc-Garde was only slowly and gradually armed. Officers had pistols from the outset, but it was not until autumn 1943, following the upsurge in attacks against its members, that the Franc-Garde received some pistols recovered from British drops to the Resistance. In January 1944 the Franc-Garde was authorized to draw on stockpiles of arms built up after the military armistice, and in March 1944 it was authorized to form a machine gun and mortar section to participate in the attack on the wooded country of Maquis des Glières resistance group. Finally, each dizaine was equipped with two Sten submachine guns, the French MAC 24/29 machine gun and MAS 36 rifles. As a result of refusal by the Germans, the Franc-Garde was never issued with heavy weapons, artillery or armored vehicles.

In 1944 also, a Franc-Garde school was set up in Poitiers.

== See also ==
- Secret police
- Joseph Darnand's Service d'ordre légionnaire (SOL)
- Maquis du Vercors

== Sources and bibliography ==
- Jacques Delperrié de Bayac, Histoire de la Milice, 1918–1945, (History of the Militia, 1918–1945), Fayard, 1969, reprinted in paperback Marabout.
- Pierre Giolitto, Histoire de la Milice, (History of the Militia), Editions Perrin, collection Tempus, 2002.
- David Littlejohn, Foreign Legions of the Third Reich (volume 1), James Bender Publishing, USA 1987 .
- Pascal Ory, Les Collaborateurs 1940-1945, éditions du Seuil, 1976 . Pascal Ory, Les Contributors 1940-1945, Editions du Seuil, 1976.
