= Grands Goulets =

Gorge in the western part of the Vercors Massif

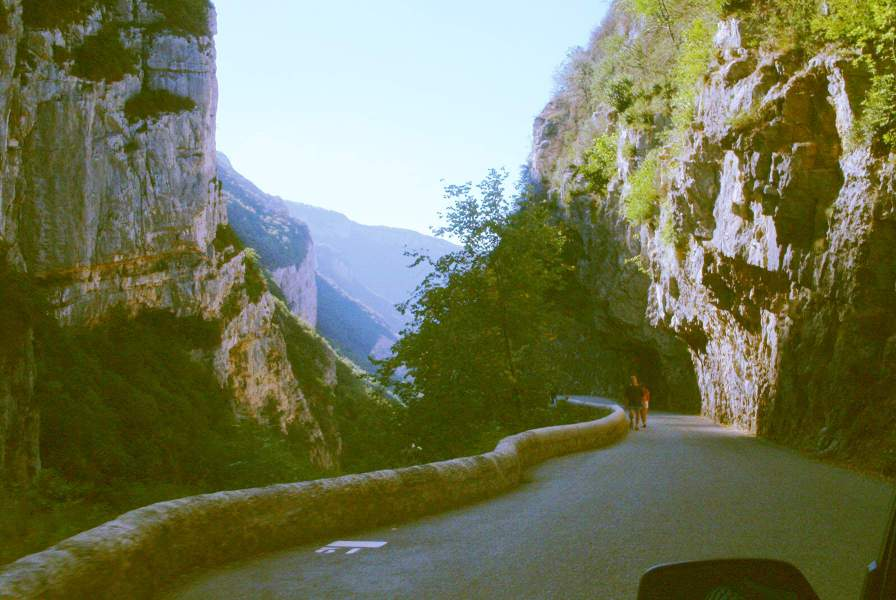
- The Grands Goulets Road shortly before its closure in 2005

- Location within Auvergne-Rhône-Alpes Location within Occitanie Location within France

Naming
- English translation: "Great Bottlenecks"

Geography
- Location: France
- Country: France
- State: Drôme
- Region: Auvergne-Rhône-Alpes
- Coordinates: 45.046593°N 5.352170°E
- River: Vernaison
- Interactive map of Grands Goulets

Les Grands Goulets (French language: The Great Bottlenecks) is a gorge in the western part of the Vercors Massif, located in the department of Drôme in Southeastern France. The gorge forms the head of the Vernaison Valley.

Between 1844 and 1851, the Grands-Goulets Road (Route Départementale RD 518) was constructed, a "balcony road" built into the sheer limestone cliffs of the gorge to link the Pont-en-Royans area to the Vercors plateau at Échevis. The single-track road has numerous tunnels and few passing-places and was formerly popular with tourists.

During the Second World War, the plateau became a stronghold of a French Resistance group called the Maquis du Vercors. On 22 January 1944, a column of 300 German troops arrived at the Grands Goulets on a punitive expedition. A small force of Maquisards attempted to block their progress but were either outgunned or outflanked by Gebirgsjäger Alpine troops at each blocking position that they established. When the coloumn reached Échevis, they burned the village in retaliation for the ambush of a German staff car a few days earlier. A plaque at La Chapelle-en-Vercors commemorates the twenty Maquisards who were killed in the fighting. The damaged road was later repaired and reopened in September 1945.

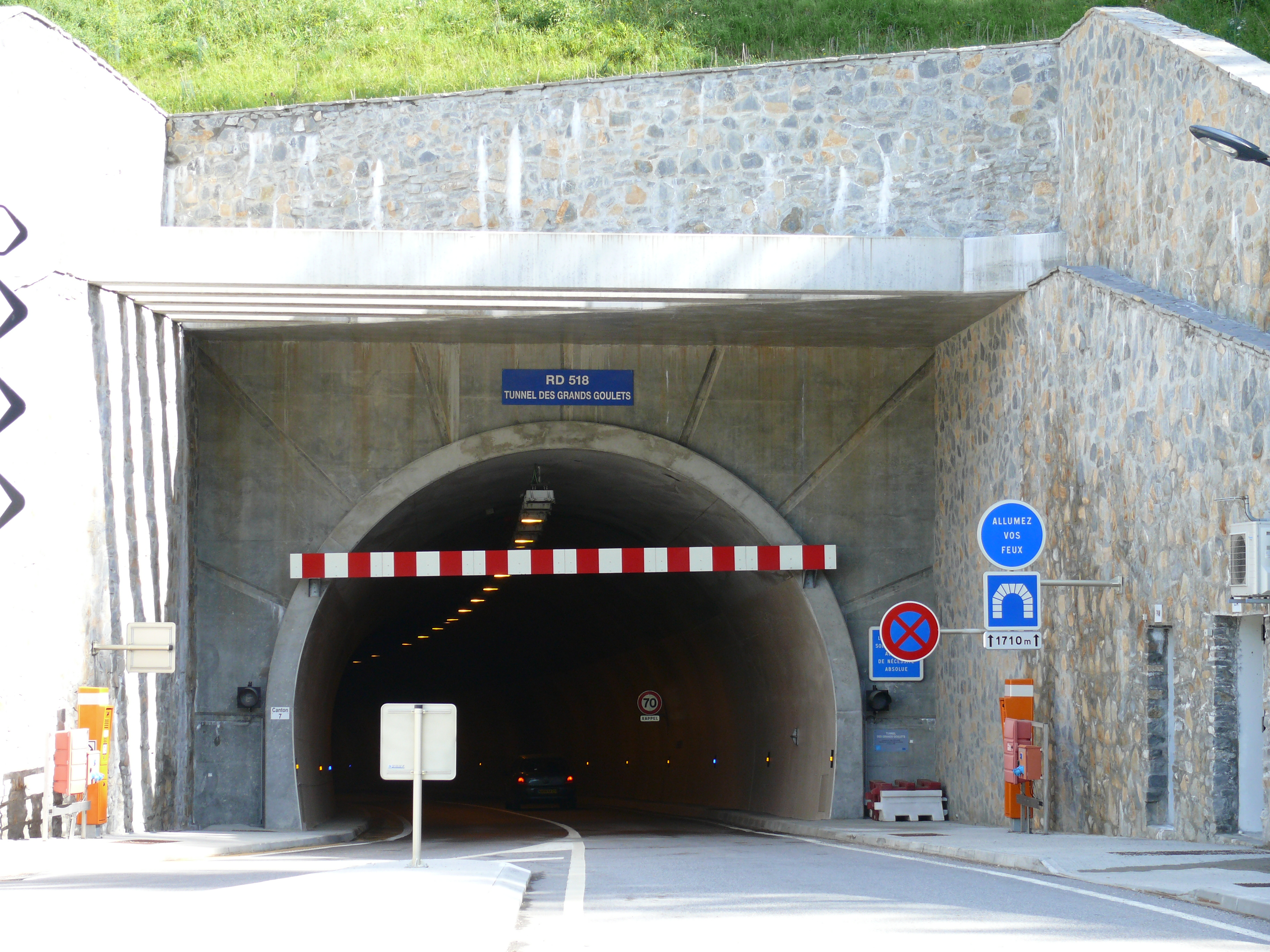
The 2008 Grands Goulets Tunnel.

After rockfalls in 2000 and 2005, the road was permanently closed to vehicles and pedestrians. A replacement road tunnel, 1,710 metres (5,610 ft) long and 7 metres (23 ft) wide was constructed, costing €50 million; it opened in 2008. A scheme to reopen the top 200 metres (660 ft) of the road to pedestrians as a tourist attraction was proposed by local authorities in 2016.

The Grands Goulets are classified as a ZNIEFF or Zone naturelle d'intérêt écologique, faunistique et floristique (Natural zone of ecological interest, fauna and flora).

== Gallery ==
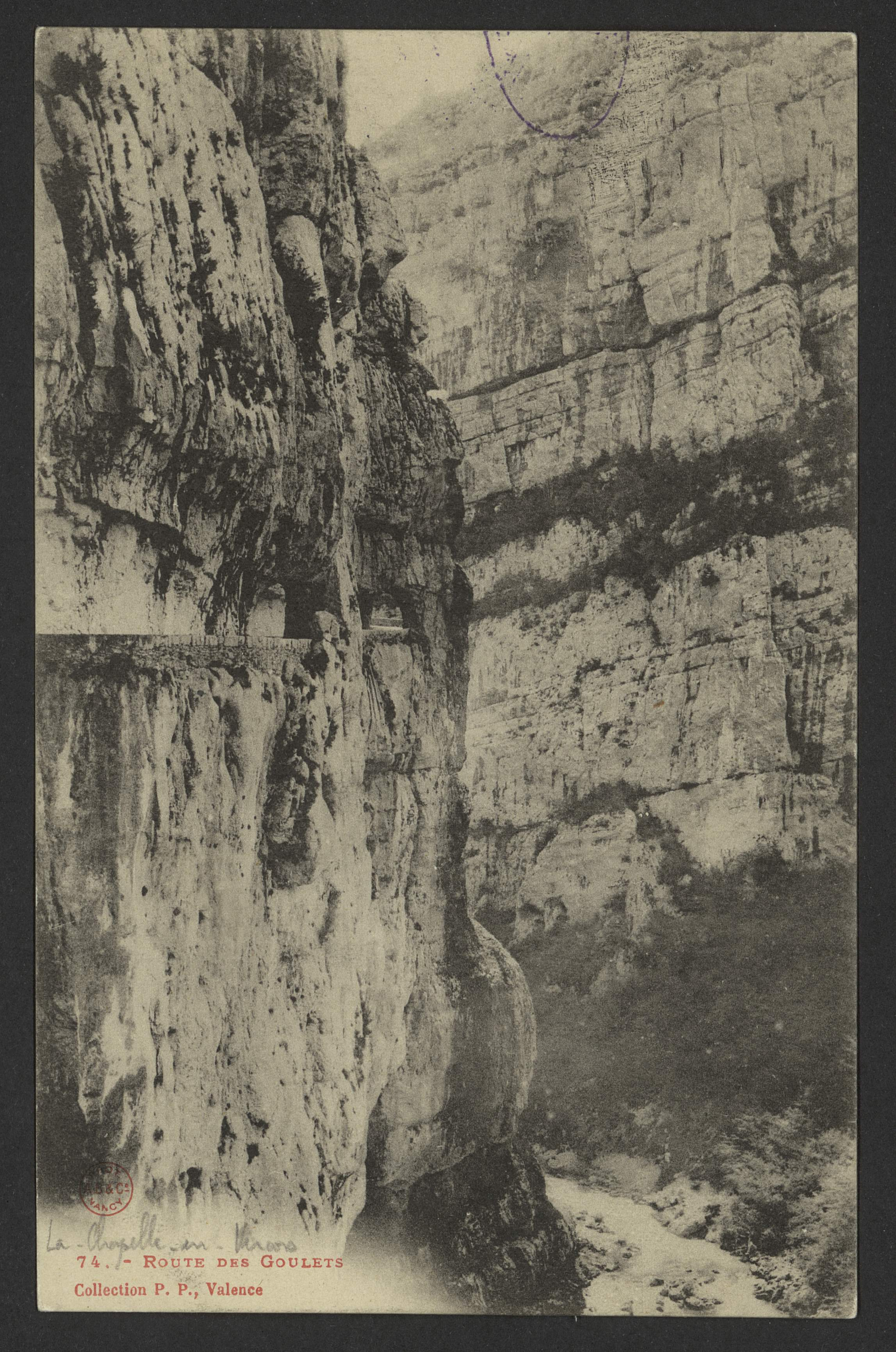
The Grand Goulets Road, circa 1900

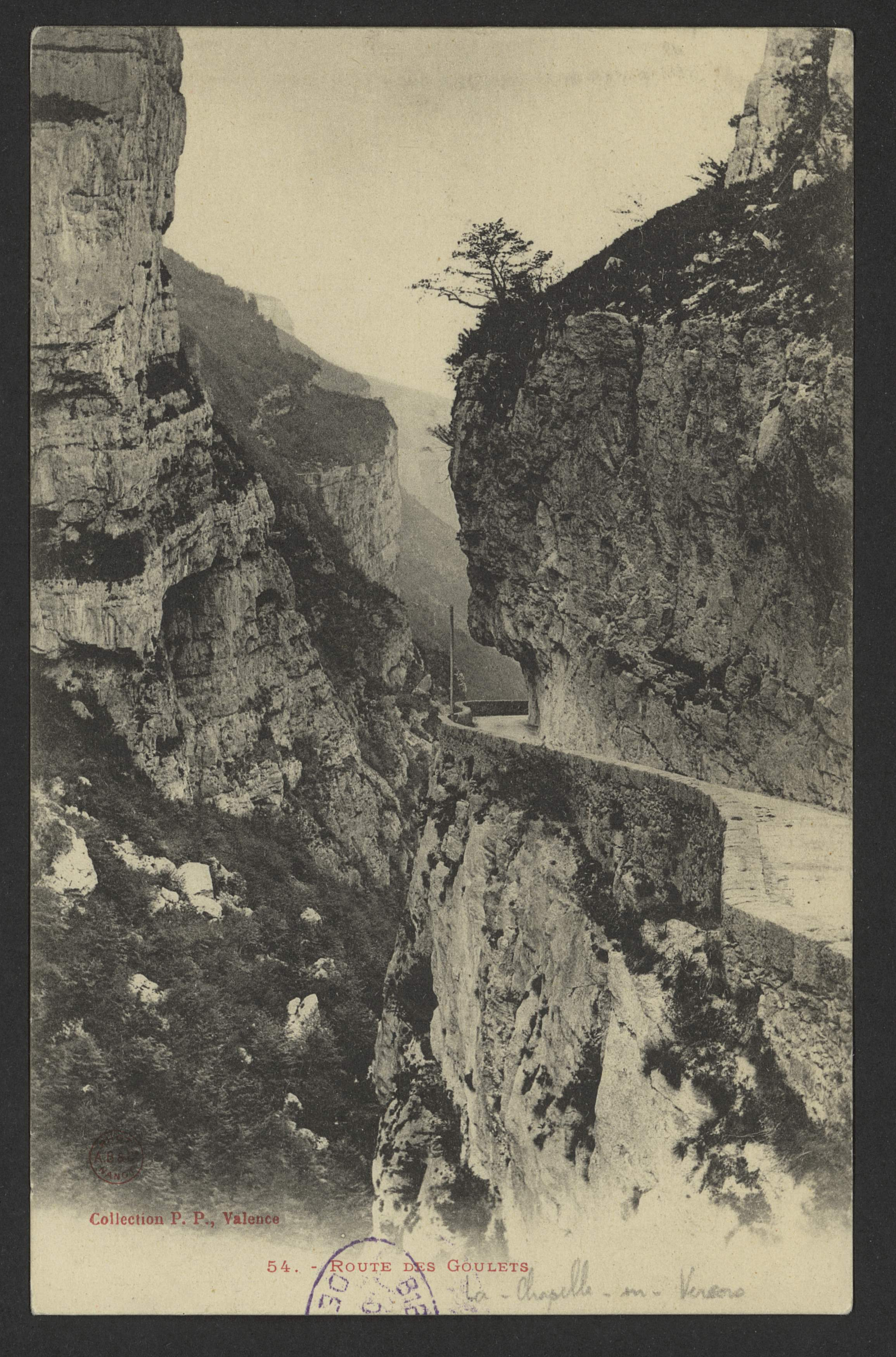
The Grand Goulets Road, circa 1900

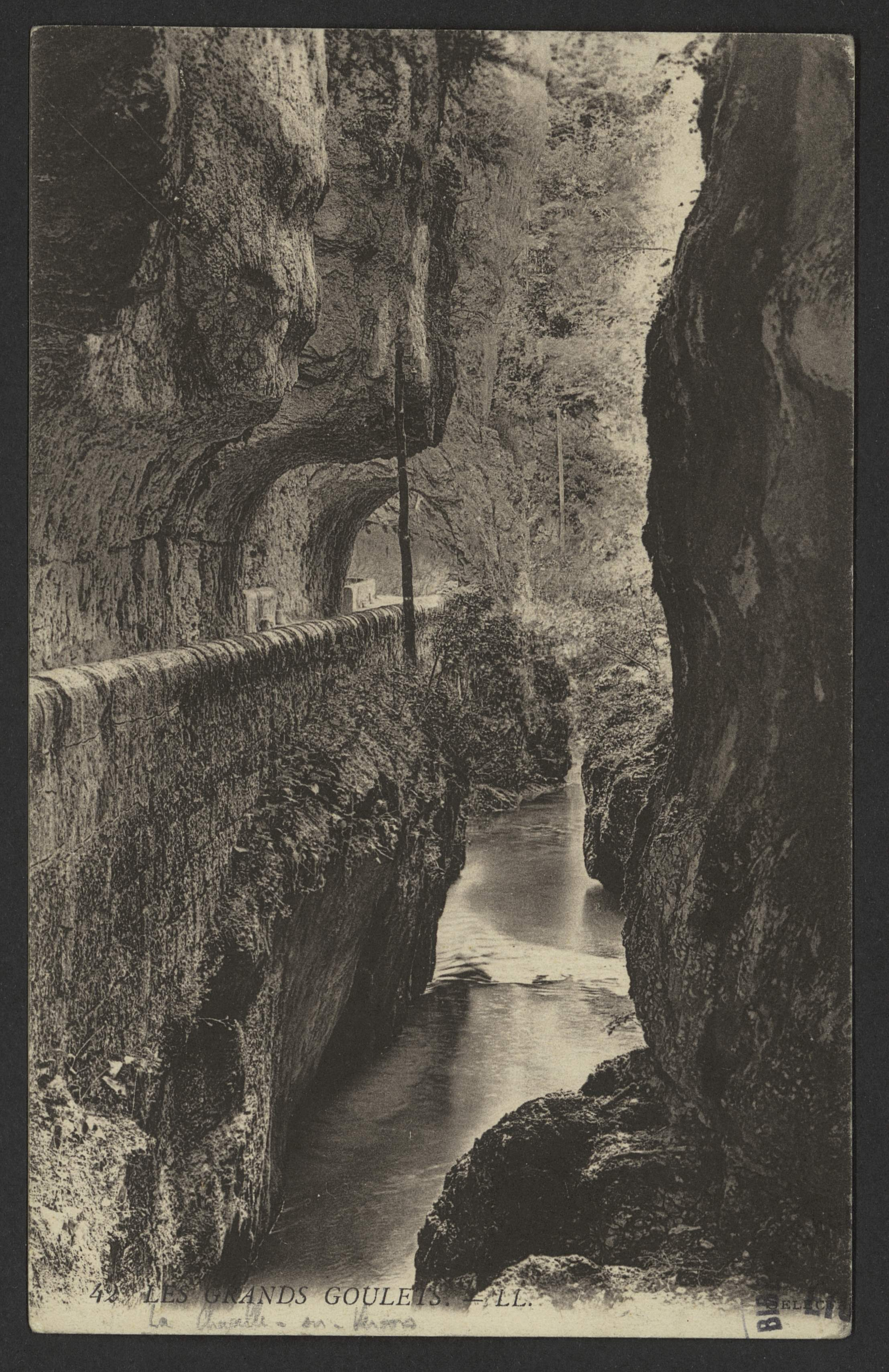
The Grand Goulets Road, circa 1910
