= François de Grossouvre =

French politician

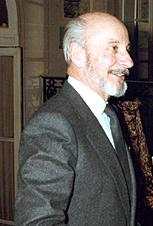
- Born: 29 March 1918; France
- Died: 7 April 1994 (aged 76); Élysée Palace, Paris, France
- Cause of death: Suicide by gunshot
- Occupation: French politician

François de Grossouvre (29 March 1918 – 7 April 1994) was a French politician who was appointed in 1981 by the newly elected President François Mitterrand with the tasks of overseeing national security and other sensitive matters, particularly those concerning Lebanon, Syria, Tunisia, Morocco, Gabon, the Persian Gulf countries, Pakistan and both Koreas. He was also in charge of the French branch of Operation Gladio, the stay-behind paramilitary secret armies created by NATO during the Cold War.

He was found dead with gunshot wounds at the Élysée Palace, the French President's official residence. The death was ruled a suicide.

== Early life ==
François de Grossouvre was born in an aristocratic family, the descendant of Jean-François Durand, seigneur de Grossouvre (1735–1832). His father, a banker, died in 1923 in Beirut, where he resided. François de Grossouvre thereafter kept affective ties to Lebanon. He then studied with the Jesuits in France and studied medicine.

During the Second World War, he was posted as an auxiliary physician in a regiment of Moroccan tirailleurs. He then joined the ski troops in the Vercors region. There, he met Captain Bousquet, who created one of the first units of the Organisation de résistance de l'armée (ORA). He returned to Lyon, where he received his doctorate in 1942. Afterward, he became a doctor of the 11th regiment of cuirassiers, headed by Colonel Lormeau.

Grossouvre became a member of Joseph Darnand's Service d'ordre légionnaire (SOL), a Vichyist militia. He left it in 1943 to fight in the Vercors and joined the maquis of the Chartreuse, near Grenoble (code-name "Clober"). After the Liberation, he declared that he had in fact infiltrated the SOL on behalf of ORA.

Grossouvre was then recruited in 1950 by the French SDECE intelligence agency to replace Gilbert Union, an official in Lyon who had worked with the military agency BCRA.

He became leader of Arc-en-Ciel, the regional branch of Gladio (Lyon region), stay-behind anticommunist organizations during the Cold War started by NATO, under the codename "Monsieur Leduc".

According to the former SDECE agent Louis Mouchon, "His business, the A. Berger et Cie Sugar company, offered ample opportunities to stage fronts. He really had excellent contacts." According to his obituary in The Economist, "He was recruited into the French espionage service and helped to organise Gladio, an American backed plan to create an armed resistance movement in Western Europe against a Russian invasion."

He met Pierre Mendès France during the war on a bomber, who would later introduce him to François Mitterrand.

== Industrial activities ==
In 1943, he married Claudette Berger, the daughter of an industrialist, Antoine Berger, and had six children. Grossouvre managed his family-in-law's companies Le Bon Sucre (1944–1963) and A. Berger et Cie (1949–1963) and then founded the Générale Sucrière sugar company. Along with Italian collaborators, the businessman Gilbert Beaujolin and the American Alexandre Patty, he succeeded in obtaining an exclusive production licence for Coca-Cola and building the first factory of that type in France. Distribution was by the Société parisienne de boissons gazeuses and the Glacières de Paris, both subsidiaries of Pastis Pernod.

Besides his industrial activity, Grossouvre was counsellor for foreign trade of France (1952–1967) and vice-president of the Chambre de commerce franco-sarroise (1955–1962). He invested some capital in the 1953 creation of L'Express magazine and started a friendship with Françoise Giroud and Jean-Jacques Servan-Schreiber. In the 1970s, he became the largest shareholder of La Montagne and the Journal du Centre regional dailies.

== Relations with François Mitterrand ==
Grossouvre became a friend of Mitterrand during a trip to China in 1959, and participated in the Convention des institutions républicaines (CIR), a party created by Mitterrand in 1964 and dissolved at the 1971 Épinay Congress of the Socialist Party (PS). He was part of the triumvirate which presided the Fédération de la Gauche Démocrate Socialiste (FGDS), a party directed by Mitterrand, who entrusted him, among other things, with the negotiations with the Communist Party (PCF). In 1974, Grossouvre became the godfather of Mazarine Pingeot, Mitterrand's daughter, whose existence was kept secret until the 1990s.

Grossouvre participated in all of Mitterrand's campaigns, from the 1965 with the CIR, to the election of 1988 (and 1974 as well as 1981). He followed Mitterrand to the Élysée Palace in 1981 and was appointed in June chargé de mission (operations manager) and then conseiller du président (counsellor of the president) of Mitterrand, who entrusted him with security and other sensitive matters, particularly those related to Lebanon, Syria, Tunisia, Morocco, Gabon, the Gulf countries, Pakistan and the two Koreas. He travelled a lot, particularly to Arab countries, where he worked in the arms trade. His relations with Lebanese President Amine Gemayel and Syrian President Hafez al-Assad enabled him to assist in the negotiations for French hostages in the mid-1980s.

Grossouvre combined those functions with the presidency of the Comité des chasses présidentielles (Committee of Presidential Hunts), in charge of the hunting grounds of the presidency. He held that post until his death and used the grounds for informal meetings.

According to Le Figaro, the sinking of the Rainbow Warrior on 10 July 1985 had been decided at a June meeting at the Elysée Palace, attended by Defence Minister Charles Hernu, Admiral Lacoste and Grossouvre.

In July 1985, he officially ended his functions as adviser to the president, and worked as an international counsellor for the arms trader Marcel Dassault in 1986. He nevertheless kept his office at the Élysée, his flat on the Quai Branly, a secretary, and bodyguards from the GIGN with the corresponding budget. However, he began to distance himself from Mitterrand and increasingly opposed Gilles Ménage, another advisor of Mitterrand. Grossouvre was nicknamed by some "l'homme de l'ombre" (the man of the shadow).

== Death ==
Grossouvre committed suicide on 7 April 1994 by gunshot. He left no note, so his motivations were the subject of conflicting speculation at the time. His funeral took place on 11 April at the church of Saint-Pierre de Moulins (Allier). Among the 400 persons assembled were President François Mitterrand; the former Lebanese President Amin Gemayel; diplomatic representatives from Morocco and Pakistan; and the former Socialist ministers Pierre Joxe, Louis Mexandeau, and René Souchon.

== Bibliography ==
- Éminences grises, de Roger Faligot et Rémi Kauffer, éd. Fayard, 1992.
- Les éminences grises, de Christine Fauvet-Mycia, éd. Belfond, 1988.
- Guerres secrètes à l'Élysée, du Capitaine Paul Barril, éd. Albin Michel, 1996.
- La Décennie Mitterrand, Pierre Favier et Michel Martin-Roland, éd. du Seuil, tome 4, 1999
- Interlocuteur privilégié, Daniel Gamba, J'ai lu, 2003
- Le grand secret, de Claude Gubler et Michel Gonod, PLON, 1996.
- Le Point du 5 avril 2002, N° 1542, page 15. [Afterwards, the author repugnated all accusations of murder]
- VSD, 09-15 août 2001, pages 86–89.
- Historia, février 2002, N° 662, pages 62–63.
- Who's Who in France, 24° Edition 1992–1993.
- Aucun témoin ne doit survivre, Le génocide au Rwanda, d'Alison Des Forges, ed. Karthala, 1999. [Propaganda FPR]
- Le Cabinet noir, avec François de Grossouvre au coeur de l'Elysée de Mitterrand, de Frédéric Laurent, éd. Albin Michel, novembre 2006. ISBN 978-2-226-17508-3
- La Nouvelle Revue d'Histoire, par Dominique Venner, janvier-février 2007, N° 28, pages 21–24.
