= Vercors =

Vercors may refer to:

== Places ==
- Vercors Cave System, a set of long caves in the Alps of South-Eastern France
- Vercors Massif, a range of mountains and plateaus in the departments of Isère and Drome, French Alps
- Vercors Regional Natural Park, a protected area of southeastern France

== Other ==
- Maquis du Vercors, a section of the French Resistance in World War II
- Free Republic of Vercors (June-July 1944), a short lived Free government established by the French Resistance
- Jean Bruller, a French author who used the pen name Vercors
