= Milice =

Paramilitary force in Vichy France

Milice française
- Flag of the Milice
- Active: 30 January 1943–15 August 1944
- Country: Vichy France
- Allegiance: Nazi Germany
- Type: Paramilitary militia
- Role: Anti-partisan duties in Axis-controlled France
- Size: 25,000–30,000
- March: Le Chant des Cohortes
- Engagements: Maquis des Glières; Maquis du Vercors; Maquis du Mont Mouchet; Liberation of Paris; Liberation of France

Commanders
- Ceremonial chief: Pierre Laval
- Commander: Joseph Darnand

The Milice française (French pronunciation: [milis fʁɑ̃sɛz], 'French Militia'), generally called la Milice ([la milis], 'The Militia'), was a political paramilitary organization created on 30 January 1943 by the Vichy régime (with German aid) to help fight against the French Resistance during World War II. The Milice's formal head was Vichy France's Prime Minister Pierre Laval (in office 1942 to 1944), although its chief of operations and de facto leader was Secretary General Joseph Darnand. The Milice participated in summary executions and assassinations, helping to round up Jews and résistants in France for deportation. It was the successor to Darnand's Service d'ordre légionnaire (SOL) militia (founded in 1941). The Milice was the Vichy régime's most extreme manifestation of fascism. Ultimately, Darnand envisaged the Milice as a fascist single-party political movement for Vichy France.

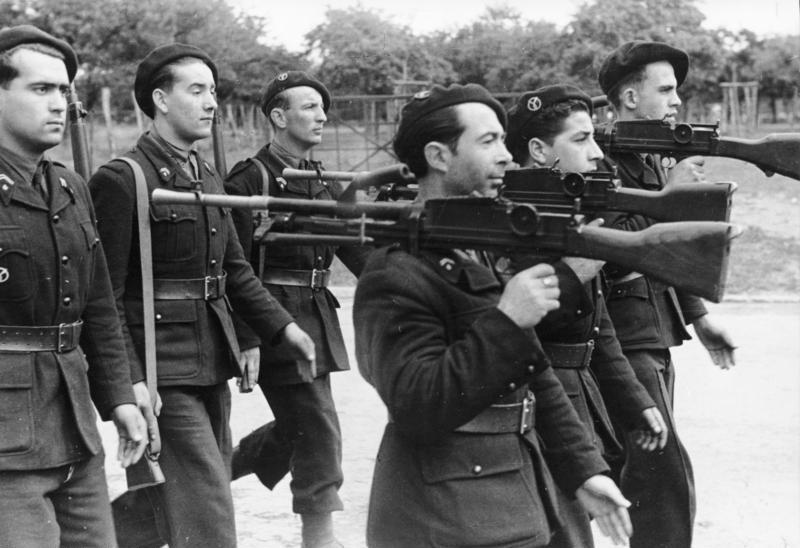
Members of the Milice, armed with captured British Bren machine guns and No. 4 Lee–Enfield rifles.

Milice members frequently used torture to extract information or confessions from those whom they interrogated. The French Resistance considered the Milice more dangerous than the Gestapo or SS because its staff were native Frenchmen who understood local dialects fluently, had extensive knowledge of the towns and countryside, and knew local people and informants.

== Membership ==
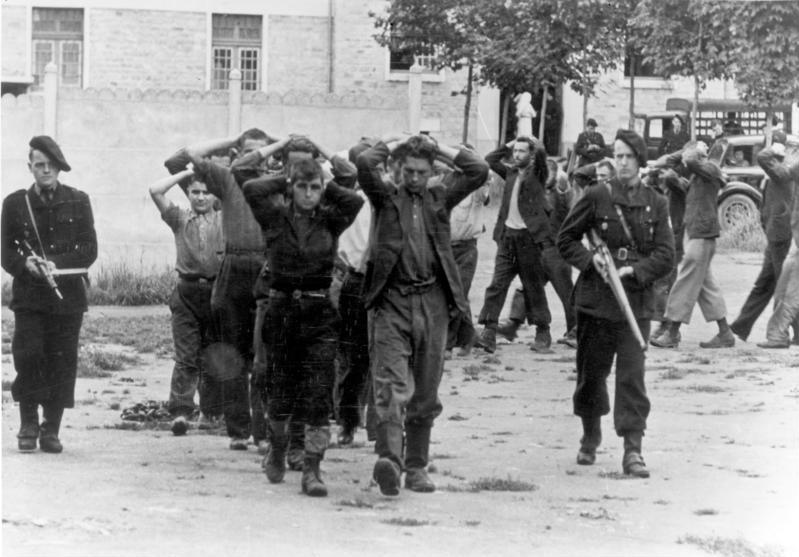
Resistance members captured by the Milice, July 1944. One of the miliciens is armed with a captured British Sten gun.

Early Milice volunteers included members of France's pre-war far-right parties, such as the Action Française, and working-class men convinced of the benefits of the Vichy government's politics. In addition to ideology, incentives for joining the Milice included employment, regular pay and rations, the latter of which became particularly important as the war continued and civilian rations dwindled to near-starvation levels. Some joined because members of their families had been killed or injured in Allied bombing raids or had been threatened, extorted or attacked by French Resistance groups. Still others joined for more mundane reasons: petty criminals were recruited by being told their sentences would be commuted if they joined the organization, and Milice volunteers were exempt from transportation to Germany as forced labour. Official figures are difficult to obtain, but several historians including Julian T. Jackson estimate that the Milice's membership reached 25,000–30,000 by 1944. The majority of members were not full-time militiamen, but devoted only a few hours per week to their Milice activities. The Milice had a section for full-time members, the Franc-Garde, who were permanently mobilized and lived in barracks.

The Milice also had youth sections for boys and girls, called the Avant-Garde.

== Symbols and materials ==
=== Emblem ===
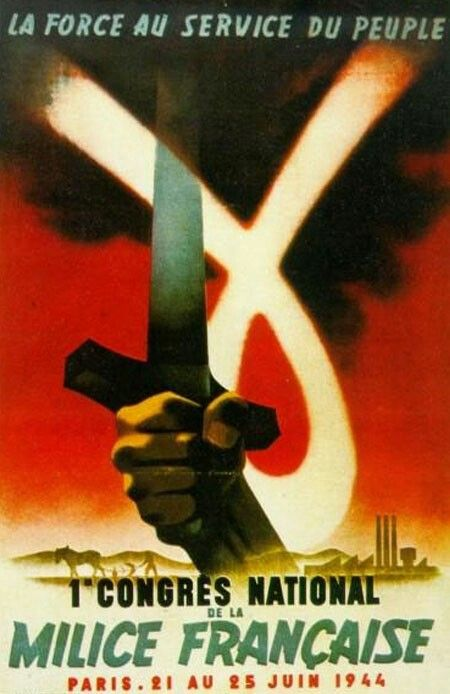
Propaganda poster for the Milice, advertising its first national congress.

The emblem of the Milice, a stylised lower-case Greek letter gamma (γ), a variant of the Aries astrological sign in the zodiac, ostensibly represented rejuvenation and replenishment of energy. The color-scheme was silver on a blue background within a red circle for ordinary miliciens, white on a black background for the full-time armed members (the francs-gardes) of the Franc-Garde, and white on a red background for the active combatants.

=== March ===
Their march was Le Chant des Cohortes.

=== Uniform ===
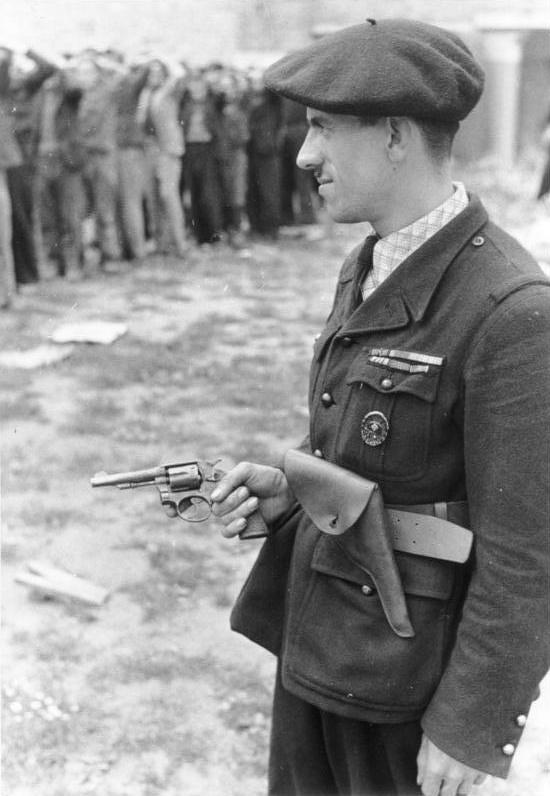
Milice member guarding Resistance PoWs wearing a German Army Wound Badge (indicating previous service with a German Army unit) and armed with a Spanish copy of the Smith & Wesson Model 10 revolver, chambered in 8mm French Ordnance.

Milice troops (known as miliciens) wore a blue uniform jacket and trousers, a brown shirt and a wide blue beret. (During active paramilitary-style operations, an Adrian helmet was used, which commonly featured the emblem, either painted on or as a badge) Its newspaper was Combats (not to be confused with the underground Resistance newspaper, Combat). The Milice's armed forces were officially known as the Franc-Garde. Contemporary photographs show the Milice armed with a variety of weapons captured from Allied forces.

=== Ranks ===
| Insignia | Rank | Translation |
|---|---|---|
| No insignia | Sécretaire général (Joseph Darnand) | Secretary general |
| No insignia | Sécretaire général adjoint (Francis Bout de l'An) | Assistant secretary general |
| | Délégué général de la milice en Zone nord (Max Knipping) | General delegate in the Northern Zone |
| | Chef régional | Regional commander |
| | Chef régional adjoint | Assistant regional commander |
| | Chef départemental | Department commander |
| | Chef départemental adjoint | Assistant department commander |
| | Chef de centre | Commander of a center (regiment) |
| | Chef de centre adjoint | Assistant commander of a center |
| | Chef de cohorte | Battalion commander |
| | Chef de cohorte adjoint | Assistant battalion commander |
| | Chef de centaine | Company commander |
| | Chef de centaine adjoint | Assistant company commander |
| | Chef de trentaine | Platoon leader |
| | Chef de trentaine adjoint | Assistant platoon leader |
| | Chef de groupe (cohorte) | Section leader (battalion) |
| | Chef de groupe (centaine) | Section leader (company) |
| | Chef de dizaine | Squad leader |
| | Chef de dizaine adjoint | Assistant squad leader |
| | Chef de main | Team leader |
| | Chef de main adjoint | Assistant team leader |
| | Franc-garde | Free guard |

== History ==
=== Beginnings ===
The Resistance targeted individual miliciens for assassination, often in public areas such as cafés and streets. On 24 April 1943 they shot and killed Paul de Gassovski, a milicien in Marseille. By late November, Combat reported that 25 miliciens had been killed and 27 wounded in Resistance attacks.

=== Reprisals ===
The most prominent person killed by the Resistance was Philippe Henriot, the Vichy regime's Minister of Information and Propaganda, who was known as "the French Goebbels". He was killed in his apartment in the Ministry of Information on the rue Solferino in the predawn hours of 28 June 1944 by résistants dressed as miliciens. His wife, who was in the same room, was spared. The Milice retaliated for this by killing several well-known anti-Nazi politicians and intellectuals (such as Victor Basch) and prewar conservative leader Georges Mandel.

The Milice initially operated in the former Zone libre of France under the control of the Vichy regime. In January 1944, the radicalized Milice moved into what had been the zone occupée of France (including Paris). They established their headquarters in the old Communist Party headquarters at 44 rue Le Peletier and at 61 rue Monceau. (The house was formerly owned by the Menier family, makers of France's best-known chocolates.) The Lycée Louis-Le-Grand was occupied as a barracks, and an officer candidate school was established in the Auteuil synagogue.

=== Notable actions ===
Perhaps the largest and best-known operation undertaken by the Milice was the Battle of Glières, its attempt in March 1944 to suppress the Resistance in the département of Haute-Savoie (in southeastern France, near the Swiss border). The Milice could not overcome the Resistance, and called in German troops to complete the operation. On Bastille Day, 14 July 1944, the Franc-Garde suppressed a revolt started by prisoners at Paris prison La Santé, killing 34 prisoners.

The legal standing of the Milice was never clarified by the Vichy government; it operated parallel to (but separate from) the Groupe mobile de réserve and other Vichy French police forces. The Milice operated outside civilian law, and its actions were not subject to judicial review or control.

=== End of the war in Europe ===
In August 1944, as the tide of war was shifting and fearing he would be held accountable for the operations of the Milice, Marshal Philippe Pétain sought to distance himself from the organization by writing a harsh letter rebuking Darnand for the organization's "excesses." Darnand's response suggested that Pétain ought to have voiced his objections sooner.

After the Allied Liberation of France, French collaborators began fleeing the Allied advance in the west. During a period of unofficial reprisals immediately following on the German retreat, large numbers of miliciens were executed, either individually or in groups. Milice offices throughout France were ransacked, with agents often being brutally beaten and then thrown from office windows or into rivers before being taken to prison. At Le Grand-Bornand, French Forces of the Interior executed 76 captured members of the Milice on 24 August 1944.

Those Frenchmen who managed to escape to Germany and were serving in the German Navy, the National Socialist Motor Corps (NSKK), the Organisation Todt and the Milice security police became part of a new unit known as the Waffen Grenadier Brigade of the SS Charlemagne (Waffen-Grenadier-Brigade der SS Charlemagne). The unit also included some remaining personnel from the disbanded Legion of French Volunteers Against Bolshevism (LVF) and the SS-Volunteer Sturmbrigade France (SS-Freiwilligen Sturmbrigade "Frankreich"). Later in February 1945, the unit was renamed the Charlemagne Division of the Waffen-SS. At this time it had a strength of 7,340 men: 1,200 men from the LVF, 1,000 from the Sturmbrigade, 2,500 from the Milice, 2,000 from the NSKK, and 640 who were former Kriegsmarine and naval police. Some of its surviving members were among the last defenders of Hitler's bunker, fighting suicidally to the end in the ruins of Berlin.

=== Aftermath ===
An unknown number of miliciens managed to escape prison or execution, either by going underground or fleeing abroad. A few were later prosecuted. The most notable of these was Paul Touvier, the former commander of the Milice in Lyon. In 1994, he was convicted of ordering the retaliatory execution of seven Jews at Rillieux-la-Pape. He died in prison two years later.

== In popular culture ==
- Since the war, the term milice has acquired a derogatory meaning in France.
- The Milice, as well as the youth section Avante-Garde, feature throughout the 1970 ITV TV series “Manhunt”.
- The French hard rock ensemble Trust had a hit named "Police Milice", where its frontman Bernard Bonvoisin compared modern-day police officers to the Milice.
- Louis Malle's films Lacombe, Lucien and Au revoir les enfants include the Milice as part of the plot.
- The 2003 drama The Statement, directed by Norman Jewison and starring Michael Caine, was adapted from the 1996 novel of the same name by Brian Moore. He shaped it from the story of Paul Touvier, a Vichy French Milice official who hid for years (often sheltered by the Catholic Church) and was indicted in 1991 for war crimes. Both he and the film character had supervised a mass murder of Jews.
- The film Female Agents (French: Les Femmes de l'ombre), set during World War II, has a scene where two of the female agents walk past a recruitment poster for the Milice which says "Against Communism / French Militia / Secretary-General Joseph Darnand".
- In the Doctor Who audio story Resistance, the Doctor and Polly have to evade the Milice in 1944.
- They feature prominently in the popular French TV series Un Village Français which covers the whole period of the occupation and liberation and was broadcast in France and extensively internationally.
- They are enemies in the 2000 video game Medal of Honor: Underground.
- The Catholic priest Father Fehily from the Ross O'Carroll-Kelly series of novels is revealed to have served in the Milice as a young man, in the novel Should Have Got Off at Sydney Parade (2007).

== See also ==
Axis

- Lorenzen Group – Danish pro-German paramilitary group
- Security Battalions – Greek pro-German paramilitary group
- Carlingue – the French version of the Gestapo.
- Special Brigades – Paramilitary sections of the Vichy Police service.
- Geheime Feldpolizei – the secret military police of the Wehrmacht that worked alongside the Milice

Allies

- Maquis des Glières – resistance group
- Maquis du Vercors – resistance group
