= Battle of Vercors =

1944 World War II battle

- Part of French Resistance
- Vercors Massif
Date	21 July 1944 – 5 August 1944 (2 weeks and 1 day)
Location	Vercors Plateau, France 44.8961°N 5.3708°E
Result	German victory

Belligerents
Germany; Vichy France	Republic of Vercors; Supported by United States; United Kingdom

Commanders and leaders
(Nazi Germany) Karl Pflaum (Vichy France) Raoul Dagostini	François Huet

Units involved
157th Reserve Infantry Division; Other units	Mostly local forces

Strength
8,000–10,000; 67 combat aircraft (36 aircraft operational); 500 Milice Franc-Gardes	4,000 Maquisards

Casualties and losses
65 killed 133 wounded 18 missing	639 maquisards killed
- 201 civilians killed 500 houses destroyed

The Battle of Vercors in July and August 1944 was between a rural group of the French Forces of the Interior (FFI) [maquis] and the armed forces of Nazi Germany which had occupied France since 1940 in the Second World War.

The maquis used the prominent scenic plateau known as the Massif du Vercors (Vercors Plateau) as a refuge. The maquis carried out sabotage and partisan operations against the Germans. After the Normandy Invasion of 6 June 1944, the leadership of a force of about 4,000 maquis declared the Free Republic of Vercors and attempted to create a conventional army to oppose the German occupation.

The Allies supported the maquis with parachute drops of weapons and by supplying teams of advisors and trainers but the uprising was premature. In July 1944, up to 10,000 German soldiers invaded the massif and killed more than 600 maquisards and 200 civilians. It was Germany's largest anti-partisan operation in Western Europe. In August 1944, shortly after the battle for the Vercors, the area was liberated from German control by the Americans and the FFI.

== Geography ==
The Vercors Massif is a roughly triangular-shaped plateau with a maximum north–south length of 60 km (37 miles) and a maximum width of 40 km (25 miles). The area is 135,000 ha (520 sq mi). The lowlands surrounding the steep-sided plateau average about 250 m (820 ft) in elevation above sea level while the top of the massif has an average elevation of about 1,000 m (3,300 ft) with a maximum elevation of 2,341 m (7,680 ft) at Grand Veymont.

Unlike a flat-topped mesa, three ridges run along the top of the massif from north to south. Only a few roads climb the steep slopes to the massif and the population lives in a few small villages. The porous limestone rocks and karst terrain result in an extensive system of caves, caverns and a scarcity of surface water in the form of streams, springs and shallow wells. These characteristics would be important during the battle as the Germans took control of the water sources and ambushed maquis seeking water.

The city of Grenoble, which had a large German military garrison, is situated at the foot of the steep cliffs of the Vercors Massif at its northeastern edge. An important Luftwaffe base was located at Chabeuil, just below the south-western rim of the Vercors.

== Background ==
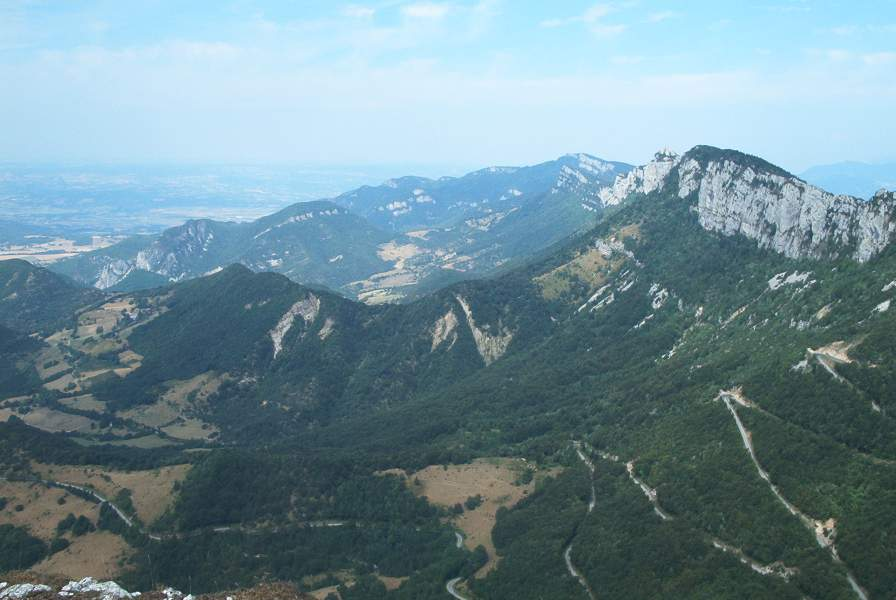
The road over Col de Tourniol on the western flank of the massif

by the early months of 1943, the forest and fastnesses of places like the Vercors had become home and refuge to a polyglot collection of the elements of defeated France: its new generations, its old administrators, its competing political parties, its heterodox communities and the scattered fragments of its once proud army.

— Paddy Ashdown, The Cruel Victory.

Beginning in 1942, the Service du Travail Obligatoire (STO, Compulsory Work Service) resulted in the deportation of hundreds of thousands of young French men to Nazi Germany to work as forced labour for the German war effort. To avoid the STO, tens of thousands of men fled into the mountains and forests of France and joined the maquis, the rural resistance fighters against the German occupation.

In 1943, three men, mountaineer Pierre Dalloz, soldier Alain Le Ray, and writer Jean Prévost planned to use the Vercors as a redoubt and a staging area for resistance to the German occupation. Following Operation Anton the German occupation of the Zone libre (Free Zone) and the disbandment of the Vichy Armistice Army, about fifty soldiers of the 11th Cuirassier Regiment arrived in the Vercors but kept themselves distinct from the maquis, whom they regarded as amateurs.

In August 1943, Francis Cammaerts, code-name Roger, an agent of the British Special Operations Executive (SOE) organization, journeyed to the Vercors and met with French soldier Eugène Chavant. Cammaerts liked the Vercors plan. He foresaw the Vercors and other nearby mountainous areas as drop zones for allied paratroopers who would work with the local maquis to tie down German military forces and assist the Allied forces in the invasion of southern France (Operation Dragoon) which was being planned. Cammaerts arranged for the first airdrop of arms and supplies by the SOE to the Vercors maquis on 13 November 1943.

On 6 January 1944 a three-man "Union" mission, including US Marine Peter Ortiz from the American Office of Strategic Services (OSS), Colonel Pierre Fourcaud, of the French secret service and Harry Thackthwaite of SOE, met to evaluate the capabilities of the Resistance in the Alpine region of France. Along with Cammaerts they organized, trained and armed the maquis to prepare them for an important role in support of the allied invasion of southern France. The Union group departed France in May 1944.

The Germans had no soldiers stationed on the Vercors Massif but in response to sabotage activities of the maquis conducted periodic raids usually launched from Grenoble. The first raid was on 25 November 1943 and a wireless operator was captured and another wounded. On 22 January 1944, a column of 300 German troops arrived at the Grands Goulets gorge on a punitive expedition in retaliation for the ambush of a German staff car a few days earlier. A small force of maquisards attempted to block their progress on the narrow road but were either outgunned or outflanked by Gebirgsjäger Alpine troops at each blocking position that they established; twenty maquis were killed. When the Germans reached Échevis on the plateau, they burned the village.

The Germans also used the Milice (a pro-German French paramilitary militia) to suppress the growing strength of the resistance on the Vercors massif. On 15 April 1944 a column of 25 Milice vehicles attacked the village of Vassieux, burning several farms and shooting or deporting some of the inhabitants.

== Mixed signals ==
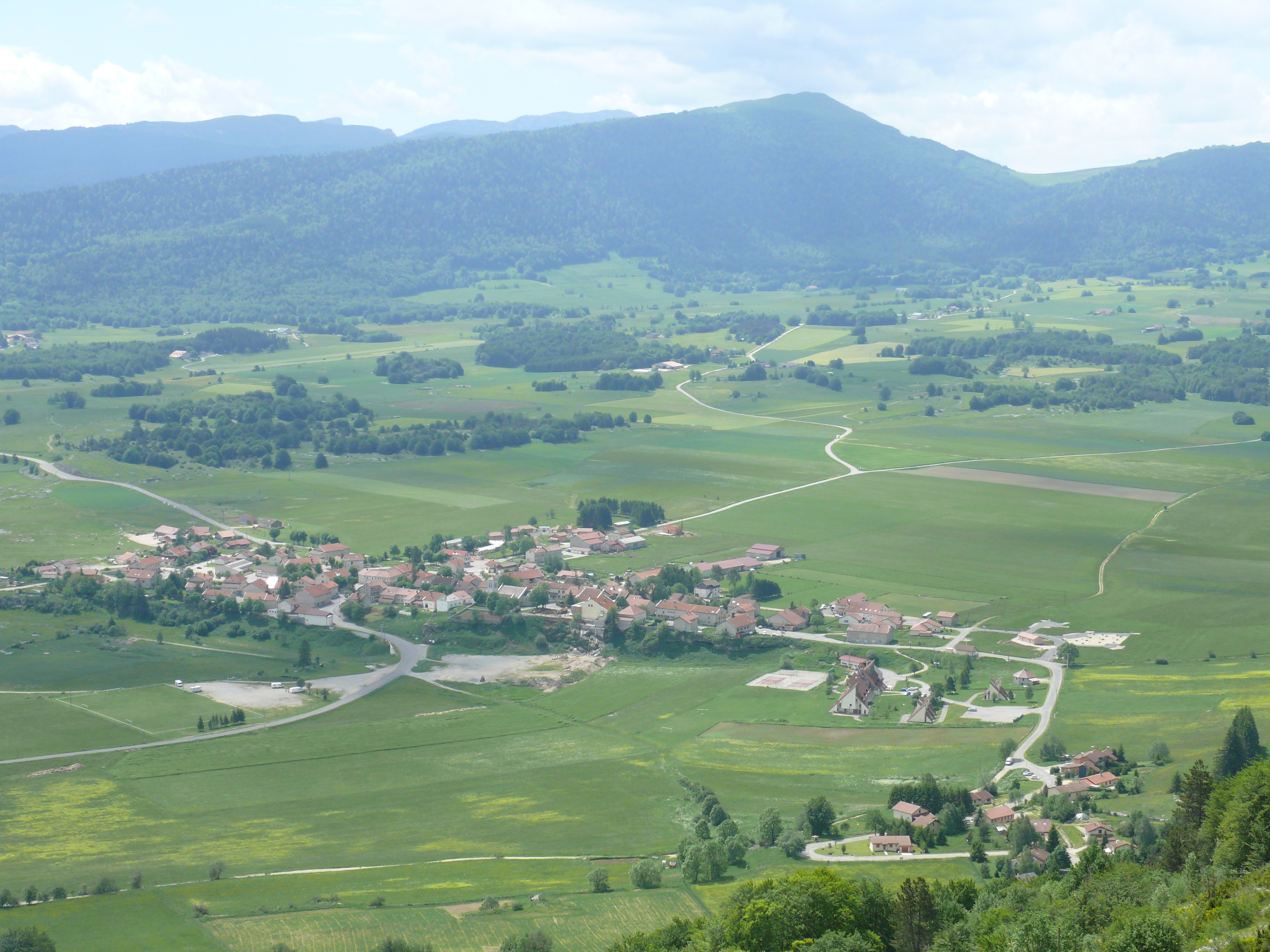
The village of Vassieux

In the weeks leading up to the Operation Overlord, the invasion of Normandy, on 6 June 1944, the instructions given by the Allies to the maquis on the Vercors Massif were contradictory and inconsistent on whether the maquis should rise against the Germans immediately after D-Day or should wait until later, when it could be of maximum help to the Allies.

The contradictions are illustrated by the differences in the D-Day messages of the Allied commander, Dwight D. Eisenhower, and the Free French leader, Charles de Gaulle. Eisenhower urged all the maquis in France to be cautious and patient, but de Gaulle's emotional message was interpreted by the maquis as a call to take up arms immediately.

On D-Day, Cammaerts on the Vercors Massif gave the message to the maquis that clandestine sabotage should continue, but it should remain hidden, as "it would be at least two months before they would be needed". Cammaerts knew also that similar uprisings in other areas had been crushed by the Germans. To the contrary, on June 8, Marcel Descour, the regional leader of the French Resistance, instructed Francois Huet, the new commander of the Vercors maquis, to mobilise. Huet objected that he had neither the men nor the arms to defend Vercors, but Descour assured him that the Allies would send reinforcements.

The Vercors maquis expected the invasion of southern France shortly after D-Day but it took place more than two months later. The maquis also anticipated incorrectly that Allied paratroopers would land on the massif to assist it and that it would be supplied with anti-tank and other heavy weapons to fight the Germans. "We shall not forget the bitterness of having been abandoned alone and without support in time of battle", wired the FFI commander to London. The Allied forces' priorities were the Normandy front and Operation Dragoon, the latter in southern France, and not the maquis of Vercors.

== German attacks ==
The large majority of the fighters were young and inexperienced men. The few French and allied instructors tried everything to train them fully but, owing to shortage of time and ammunition, this task turned out to be too challenging.

— Peter Lieb, Vercors 1944.

German repression of the maquis on the Vercors Massif began on 11 June with a reconnaissance-in-force from the city of Grenoble to the village of Saint-Nizier-du-Moucherotte. The small German force was repulsed by the maquis controlling the only road leading up the massif to Saint-Nizier. On 15 June the Germans returned with artillery and a larger force and forced the maquis to withdraw.

During the remainder of June, the Germans sent several more probing attacks onto the Vercors. The Allies parachuted arms and supplies to the maquis on 27 June and sent an OSS team of 15 American soldiers commanded by Lt. Vernon G. Hoppers and a four-man SOE team headed by Major Desmond Longe. Longe spoke little or no French and Cammaerts took offense at the unannounced arrival of Longe's team, calling them "unprofessional voyeurs" and asserting his authority as the senior British official in southeastern France.

=== Free Republic of Vercors ===
While François Huet was attempting to create a conventional army from the maquis, journalist and De Gaulle supporter Yves Farge was organizing the politics of the Vercors resistance. On 3 July 1944 Farge and a committee proclaimed the Free Republic of Vercors, the first independent territory in France since the beginning of the German occupation in 1940. The Free Republic had its own flag, i.e., the French Republic tricolour featuring the Cross of Lorraine and the "V" for Vercors and Victory (both used as a signature by de Gaulle's Free French) and its coat of arms, the French Alpine Chamois. It was a short-lived republic; it ceased to exist before the end of the month.

=== Bastille Day ===
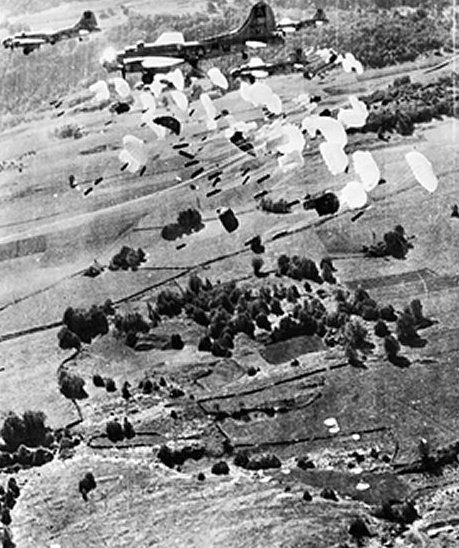
B-17s dropping supplies to the Maquis on 14 July 1944

On 14 July, 72 American B-17 bombers dropped by parachute 870 CLE Canisters containing weapons, including supplies and anti-tank Bazookas, to the Maquis of Vercors. It was a daylight drop and the Germans quickly detected it and launched air strikes to bomb the canisters, the maquis fighters attempting to recover them, and the village of Vassieux, destroying one-half of the 85 houses in the village. Working with the maquis to collect the canisters was a newly arrived SOE courier, Christine Granville (Krystyna Skarbek)

The large, daytime drop of weapons, instead of the usual smaller night drops, was criticized by the maquis leaders as igniting German worries that the Vercors would become a serious threat to their forces and lines of communications. The German response was to organize one of their largest anti-resistance military operations in France during World War II.

=== Battle ===
Lt. General Karl Ludwig Pflaum was the commander of the German forces attacking the Vercors maquis. With eight to ten thousand soldiers, Pflaum established a cordon of soldiers around the massif to prevent the escape of maquis and on 21 July launched a full-scale attack. German columns advanced south along a road from Saint-Nizier in the northeast and from the south along a road from the town of Die. Alpine troops crossed the formidable, but thinly defended, eastern ramparts of the massif. The preparations being made for these assaults were readily visible to the maquis; the surprise element in the offensive was the landing of 200 airborne soldiers by glider near the village of Vassieux in the rear of the maquis defense. The glider landings were supported by warplanes bombing and strafing maquis positions.

By that first evening it was clear that the German assault was succeeding. The maquis commander Huet had a meeting of his leaders and they decided to continue to fight until defeat was inevitable and then disperse to the forest and mountains of the massif, anticipating that the Germans would soon withdraw. It was also decided that Huet's superior officer in the FFI, Henri Zeller who was present at the meeting, would escape the Vercors with SOE agents Cammaerts, Granville, and wireless operator Auguste Floiras to coordinate the resistance in other areas. The maquis sent a bitter message to the Free French authorities in Algiers and to the SOE in London telling them that they were "criminals and cowards" for not sending help.

The last gasps of the organized resistance were on 23 July with the surviving maquis taking refuge in the forests or escaping to the lowlands surrounding the Vercors.

== Aftermath ==
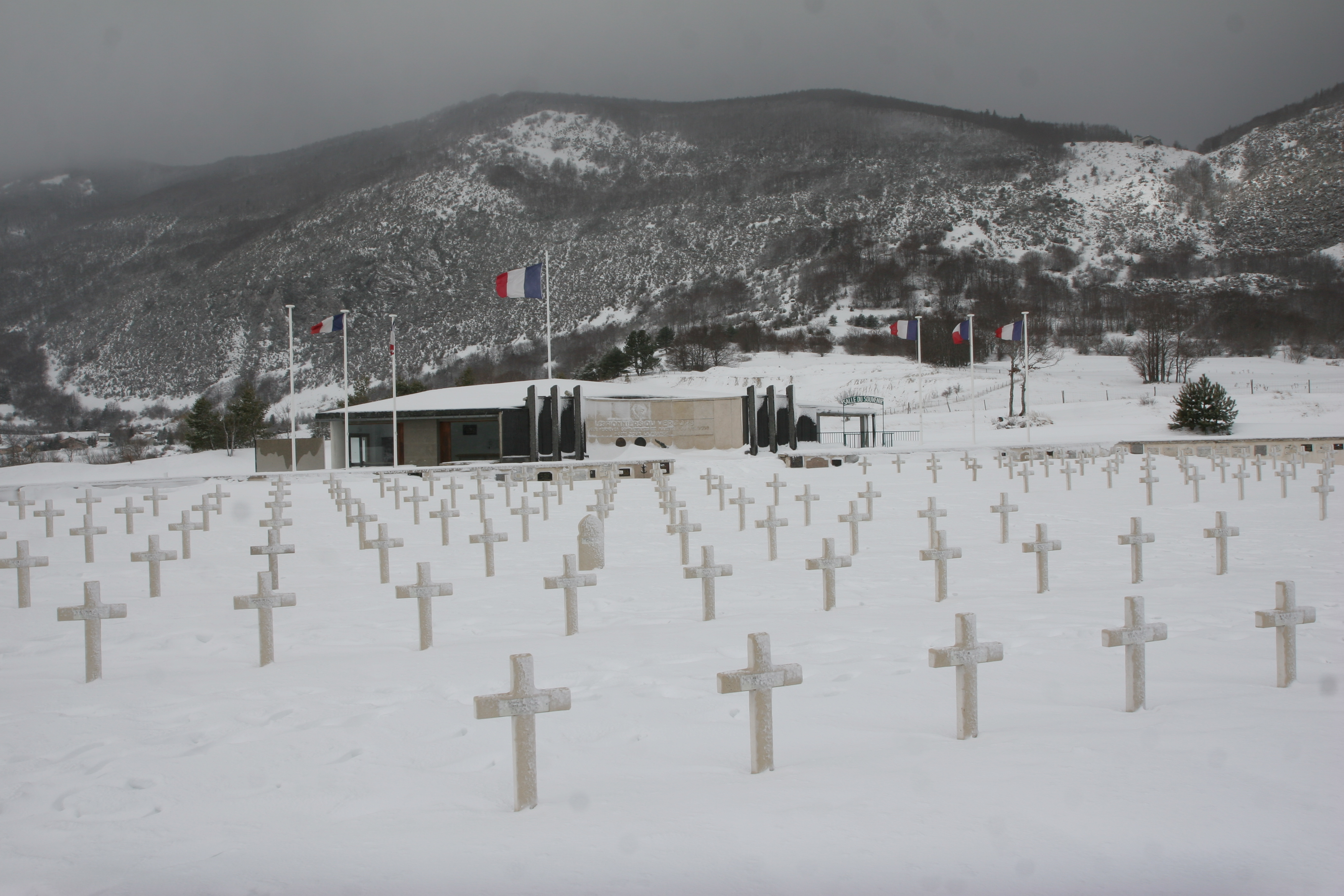
Cemetery and memorial in Vassieux-en-Vercors, where German forces composed of Russians and Ukrainians killed partisans and inhabitants

Casualties among the maquis during the battle were heavy with estimates of 659 maquis fighters and 201 civilians killed. German losses were much smaller, including 83 killed and missing.

The American team led by Hoppers and the SOE team led by Longe both escaped. Longe and Huet had already been dismissed by Cammaerts and the Maquis, they could not speak French and were not required. Huet hid in the forests until 6 August when he attempted to rally his surviving forces. Two days later they reverted to guerrilla tactics, the maquis carried out several raids, claiming they killed 27 Germans.

The long-expected allied landing in southern France took place on 15 August and the allied forces advanced rapidly northward, aided by the maquis. On 22 August the city of Grenoble was liberated from German control and maquis from the Vercors marched in the victory parade.

== German order of battle ==
According to the order of battle of 8 July 1944 from General Niehoff, Kommandant des Heeresgebietes Südfrankreich (military region of southern France), about operation Bettina against the Maquis du Vercors, it appears that the Germans deployed nearly 10,000 soldiers and policemen under General Karl Pflaum:

- Almost all the 157. Reserve-Division of the Wehrmacht:
  - Four reserve mountain light infantry battalions (Btl. I./98, II./98, 99 and 100 from the Reserve-Gebirgsjäger-Regiment 1);
  - Two reserve infantry battalions (Btl. 179 and 199 from the Reserve-Grenadier-Regiment 157 – Btl. 217 remained in the southern Alps at Embrun);
  - Two reserve artillery batteries (from Res.Geb.Art.Abt. 79 out of the Reserve-Artillerie-Regiment 7).
- Kampfgruppe "Zabel" (one infantry battalion from the 9. Panzer-Division and one Ost-Bataillon);
- Three Ost-Bataillonen;
- About 200 Feldgendarmen;
- One security battalion (I./Sicherungs-Regiment 200);
- One police battalion (I./19th SS Police Regiment);
- About 400 paratroopers (special units from Fallschirm-Kampfgruppe Schäfer).

=== Airborne troops ===
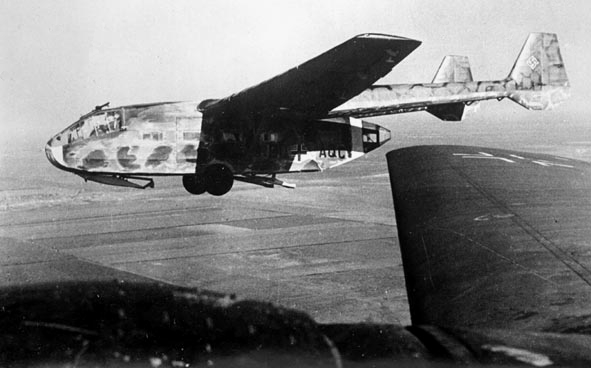
Gotha Go 242 glider in flight

According to the daily reports of OB West on 23 and 24 July 1944, forwarded by the Militärbefehlshaber in Frankreich, the following troops landed at Vassieux-en-Vercors on 21 and 23 July 1944. On 21 July 1944, about 200 men from Fallschirm-Bewährungstruppe (probationary troops) forming the Fallschirm-Kampfgruppe "Schäfer", with several French volunteers (from the Sipo-SD of Lyon or from the 8th Company of the 3rd Regiment "Brandenburg"), were airborne in 22 DFS-230 gliders (each with 1 pilot and 9 soldiers) towed by Dornier-17 bombers of I/Luftlandegeschwader 1, from Lyon-Bron to Vassieux-en-Vercors.

According to Peter Lieb, two gliders crashed and eight of them landed a bit further on, so the first wave of assault consisted only of about a hundred soldiers. Lieb specifies that the commander of the Sipo-SD of Lyon (KDS), SS-Obersturmbannführer (SS Lieutenant Colonel) Werner Knab, was also airborne on Vassieux on 21 July. Shot and wounded, he was evacuated in a Fieseler Fi 156 Storch on 24 July. He would have played an important part in the torture and the slaughter of the maquisards of Vercors and the inhabitants of Vassieux.

On 23 July 1944, three Go-242 gliders (each with 2 pilots and 21 soldiers, or weaponry and supplies) towed by Heinkel-111 bombers, and 20 DFS-230 gliders transported one Ost-Kompanie (Ostlegionen: Russian, Ukrainian and Caucasian volunteers) and a paratrooper platoon from Valence-Chabeuil to Vassieux. According to Peter Lieb, at least two DFS-230 and two Go-242 gliders landed a further on, only one Go-242 with weaponry and supplies landed on Vassieux, so the second wave of assault consisted only of about a hundred and fifty soldiers.

Thomas and Ketley wrote that the Fallschirm-Kampfgruppe "Schäfer" was detached from Kampfgeschwader 200 on 8 June 1944. It was made up of volunteers out of Fallschirmjäger-Bewährungstruppe (probationary troops), mustered at Tangerhütte and trained for three months at Dedelstorf in order to launch an attack from gliders. Günther Gellermann says that the Fallschirm-Kampfgruppe "Schäfer" was under Luftflotte 3 command and no longer under Kampfgeschwader 200 command.

== Media depictions ==
- The Maquis du Vercors is depicted and veterans act in Pierre Schoendoerffer's 2002 feature film Above the Clouds (Là-Haut).
- The third season of the British TV programme Wish Me Luck, first broadcast in 1990.
- The battle and the maquisards of Vercors also prominently feature in Frank Yerby's 1974 novel The Voyage Unplanned.
- In 1948, French director Jean-Paul Le Chanois made Au cœur de l'orage (In the Heart of the Thunderstorm), a documentary about the French Resistance during the Second World War. The film, composed of Allied clandestine film recordings and German newsreels, focuses on the battle of the Vercors Plateau during July 1944.

== See also ==
- Maquis des Glières
- Maquis du Mont Mouchet
- Maquis de l'Oisans
- Operation Rösselsprung (1944)

== Bibliography ==
- Ashdown, Paddy (2014). The Cruel Victory. London: William Collins. ISBN 9780007520817.
- Lieb, Peter (2012). Vercors 1944: Resistance in the French Alps. Oxford: McFarland. ISBN 978-1-84908-698-1.
- Ribard, Francois (2009). A la decouverte du Vercors: Parc naturel regional. Grenoble: Glenat. ISBN 978-2-7234-5849-8.
