= Joseph Darnand =

French SS officer

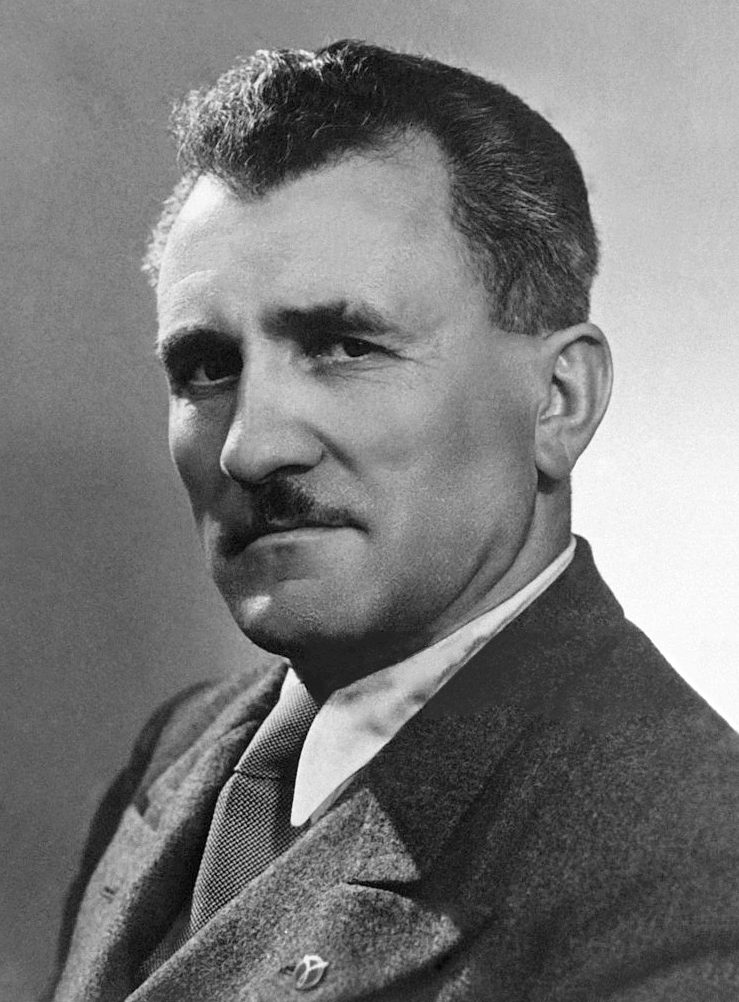
- Darnand c. 1943–1944
- Born: 19 March 1897; Coligny, Ain, Rhône-Alpes, French Third Republic
- Died: 10 October 1945 (aged 48); Fort de Châtillon, Paris, French Provisional Government
- Cause of death: Execution by firing squad
- Burial place: Batignolles Cemetery, Paris
- Military career
- Allegiance: France (1916–1940); Vichy France (1940–1944); Nazi Germany (1943–1945)
- Branch: Schutzstaffel
- Service years: 1916–1918; 1919–1921; 1939–1945
- Rank: SS-Sturmbannführer (Major)
- Conflicts: World War I Franco-Turkish War; World War II

Joseph Darnand (19 March 1897 – 10 October 1945) was a French far-right political figure, Nazi collaborator and convicted war criminal during the Second World War. A decorated veteran of the First World War and the Battle of France in 1940, he later pledged allegiance to Nazi Germany, joining the Waffen-SS on 8 August 1943.

Darnand was the de facto leader of the Milice française, a fascist paramilitary organisation established under the Vichy regime to combat the French Resistance, persecute Jews, and enforce forced labour drafts. On 1 January 1944, at the request of the German authorities, he was appointed Secretary General for Law and Order, before becoming Secretary of State for the Interior on 14 June 1944.

Following the liberation of France, he was arrested, tried for treason, sentenced to death, and executed by firing squad on 10 October 1945.

== Early years and war service ==
Darnand was born at Coligny, Ain, Rhône-Alpes in France.

On 8 January 1916, he enlisted in the 35th Infantry Regiment. He was promoted to corporal in April 1917, sergeant on 1 June 1917 and to adjutant (warrant officer) in 1918. He volunteered for a squadron that undertook dangerous missions. For his efforts in July 1918 penetrating German lines in the Champagne sector with a small force that captured prisoners and secured information about a forthcoming German offensive, "Darnand emerged a major war hero."

Demobilised after the armistice, he again enlisted for two years in the army in September 1919. After a stint in the army of occupation in Germany, he participated in the campaign against the forces of Kemal Atatürk in Cilicia. He ended his service in July 1921 as a sub-lieutenant (second lieutenant). He worked as a cabinetmaker and later founded his own transportation company in Nice.

Between the wars, Darnand joined a number of far-right political, paramilitary organizations: l'Action Française in 1925, the Croix-de-Feu in 1928, La Cagoule and Jacques Doriot's French Popular Party (PPF) in 1936. He formed his own Fascist outfit, the Chevaliers du Glaive (Knights of the Sword); in the 1930s he became prominent among La Cagoule, or the Cagoulards ("Hooded Men"), a secret terrorist group that organised bombings and assassinations, and that stored arms in depots all over France.

== Vichy collaborator ==
At the beginning of World War II, Darnand volunteered to join the French Army and was commissioned as a lieutenant. He served in the Maginot Line and was decorated for bravery. During the Phoney War, Darnand took part in several commando actions against German forces. He was captured in June 1940, but fled to Nice. He became a leading figure in the Vichy French organization Légion Française des Combattants and recruited troopers for the "fight against Bolshevism".

In 1941, Darnand was made a member of the National Council of Vichy France. The same year, he founded the collaborationist militia, Service d'ordre légionnaire (SOL), that supported Philippe Pétain and Vichy France. He offered his help against the French Resistance. On 1 January 1943 he transformed the organization into the Milice. Although Pierre Laval was its official president, Darnand was its de facto leader. Darnand's political convictions were of the far right but he was known as a Germanophobe. Nonetheless, his views toward Nazi Germany changed. By the spring of 1941, Darnand had told a friend that "France had been wrong to fight Germany in 1939." Germany's assault on the Soviet Union in June 1941 "reinforced Darnand's evolution toward collaboration."

== SS officer ==
Darnand turned to Nazi Germany and was made an officer of the SS. Darnand's turn to the SS was also influenced by the fact that miliciens were being targeted for assassination by the Resistance but Vichy and Wehrmacht authorities refused to arm the Milice.

In joining the SS, Darnand took a personal oath of loyalty to Adolf Hitler, receiving a rank of Untersturmführer (Second Lieutenant) in the Waffen-SS in August 1943.

In December 1943, he became head of police and later secretary of the interior. Joseph Darnand expanded the Milice and by 1944 it had over 35,000 members. The organization played an important role in investigating the French Resistance; as time progressed it "became ever more unrestrained," carrying out assassinations, chasing resisters, and "enthusiastically ... rounding up Jews."

In early 1944, Vichy France announced a new law empowering Darnand "to create special courts martial to try on the spot" persons caught in violent acts against the state. The law was "without precedent in modern French legal history." The Milice also aided German forces in combat against the Resistance, and Darnand himself commanded a Milice unit in March 1944 near Lyons that flushed out some maquisards (French Resistance guerilla fighters). After the invasion of Normandy and Allied advance, Darnand fled to Germany in September 1944 and joined the pro-Nazi puppet government in the Sigmaringen enclave. He received a promotion to Sturmbannführer on 1 November 1944.

== Capture, trial and execution ==
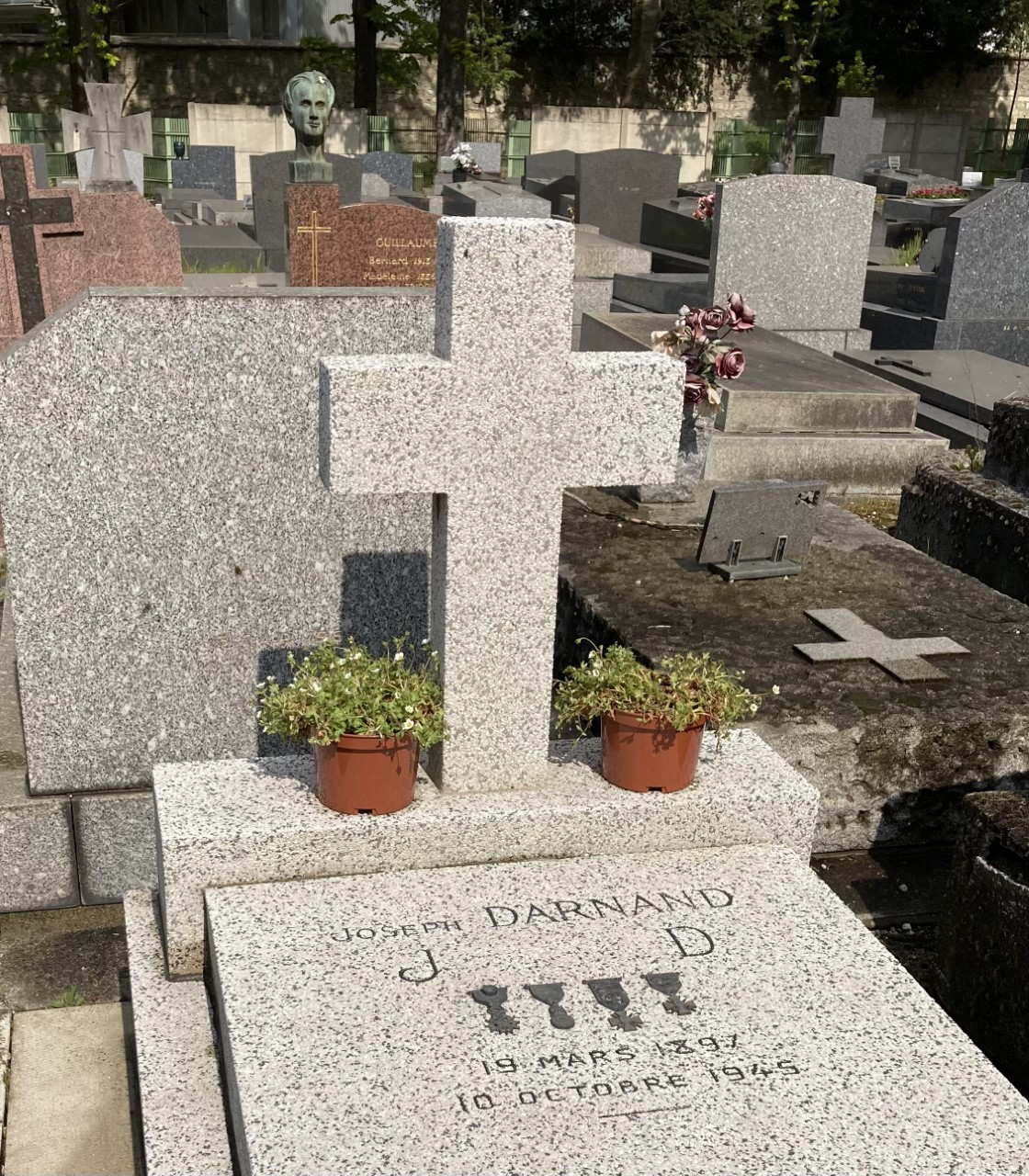
Darnand's grave in Batignolles Cemetery (Paris).

In April 1945, he fled from Sigmaringen to Merano in northern Italy. The British captured him in Italy on 25 June 1945 and took him back to France. Like some other collaboration leaders, Darnand was found guilty of collaboration with the enemy. He was sentenced to death on 3 October 1945 and executed by firing squad on 10 October 1945 at the Fort de Châtillon in Paris.
