= Service d'ordre légionnaire =

French collaborationist militia in World War II

Legionary Order Service
- Service d'ordre légionnaire
- Active: 10 July 1940 – 5 January 1943
- Country: Vichy France
- Allegiance: Nazi Germany
- Type: Militia
- Role: Collaboration
- Nickname: "SOL" (French abriviation)
- Engagements: World War II

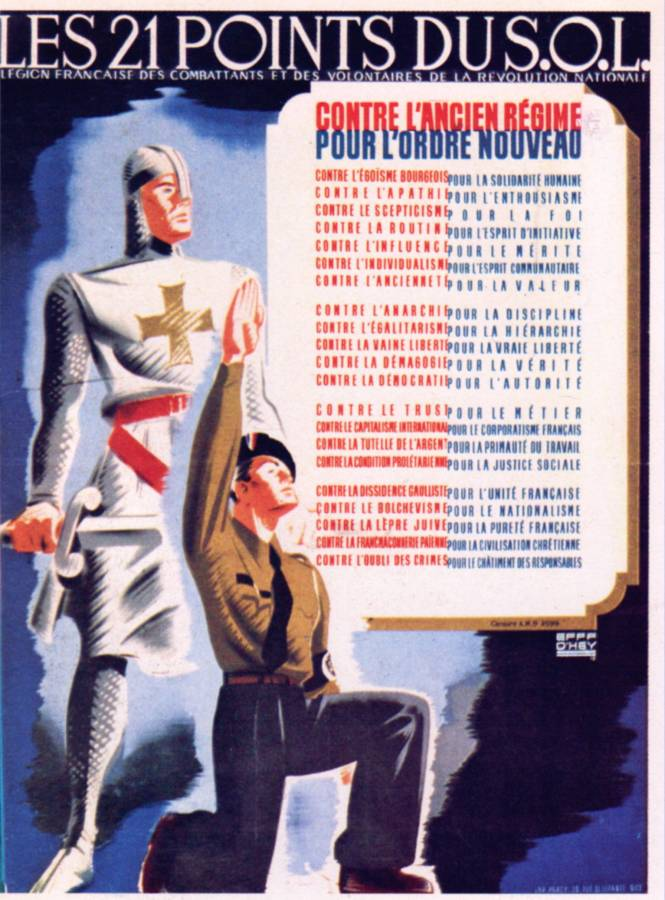
The Twenty-One Points of the S.O.L.: a list of "fors" and "againsts" beginning with, respectively, the New Order and the Old Regime

The Service d'ordre légionnaire (SOL, "Legionary Order Service") was a collaborationist militia created by Joseph Darnand, a far right veteran from the First World War. It was granted its independence in January 1943, after Operation Torch and the German occupation of the South Zone, until then dubbed "Free Zone" and controlled by Vichy. Pierre Laval himself (supported by Marshal Philippe Pétain) passed the law which accorded the SOL its independence and transformed it into the Milice, which participated in battles alongside the Nazis against the Resistance and committed numerous war crimes against civilians. After the Liberation, some members of the Milice escaped to Germany, where they joined the ranks of the SS. Those who stayed behind in France faced either drumhead courts-martial, generally followed by summary execution, or simple lynching at the hands of résistants and enraged civilians.

== Creation of the SOL ==
Joseph Darnand, who had taken part in the Cagoule fascist group's conspiracy before the Invasion of Poland, had been one of the first to rally himself to the "National Revolution" – which was the name given to the new Vichy regime issued from the 1940 defeat during the Battle of France and from the 10 July 1940 vote according extraordinary powers to Marshal Pétain. Joseph Darnand took the head of the Légion française des combattants (LFC) in the Alpes Maritimes region, and then created the SOL, which attracted not only the most enthusiast proponents of collaborationism with Nazi Germany, but also criminals from the Nice mafia. The SOL was extended to all of the South Zone and to North Africa on 12 December 1941.

This new organization was headed by Darnand, Pierre Gallet, Marcel Gombert and Jean Bassompierre, whereas its program was defined by Bassompierre, Noël de Tissot and the docteur Durandy. It advocated the cult of the leader, anti-parliamentarism, racism and anti-Semitism, as well as pushing for collaboration with the Nazis. Before the 1941-1942 turn of public opinion, France was mostly composed of pétainistes, who supported Marshal Pétain. However, various grades of collaborationism must be distinguished, as some advocated it claiming it would lighten the burden of the military occupation (this was Pétain's official discourse) and that Marshal Pétain, a figure highly respected for his role during the 1916 Battle of Verdun, could not be wrong. These collaborationist have been called Maréchalistes, as their support of the collaboration was rather based on trust towards Pétain. After his meeting with Hitler, Pétain had advocated collaboration in an 30 October 1940 speech to the radio. Others, commonly called pétainistes, advocated collaboration on ideological grounds: they supported Vichy's anti-Semitic laws which the regime had put in place on its own, without waiting for German orders. Joseph Darnand and the SOL, were at the spearhead of these ideological collaborationists, eagerly hoping for German victory in the war.

Several leaders and SOL activists engaged themselves in brutal actions against imaginary or real opponents of Vichy, and started a wave of denouncement which did not even spare the civil or religious authorities of the Etat français (name by which the Vichy regime called itself). Joseph Darnand, who headed the SOL, had based himself in Vichy. He was always supported by Pétain even in his more extreme cries in support to Collaboration. Darnand went so far that his "patriotism" came to be seen as treason, and shocked even others leaders of the Légion or of the Chantiers de la jeunesse (Youth Workshops) which were also in favor of Collaboration, but done in a "civilized" manner. Thus, it was decided to grant autonomy to the SOL on 5 January 1943, in order to take distance with the militia and at the same time grant it complete freedom of action.

== Operation Torch and transformation of the SOL into the Milice ==
Following the November 1942 Operation Torch and the landing in North Africa, which led to the German occupation of the South zone, until now designed as the "free zone" because it was under Vichy's authority, Marshal Pétain exalted in his 5 January 1943 discourse the "patriotism" of the SOL which, along with the Armée d'Afrique, had fired on the American troops. In reality, only several dozens of SOL militia had fought in Oran and in Morocco, whereas in Algiers all of the SOL militia had surrendered to the Allies during the "November 8, 1942 putsch", during which 400 poorly equipped Resistance fighters single-handedly immobilised the XIXth Corps d'Armée vichyste for 15 hours, contributing to the immediate success of the Allies' landing in Algiers.

Thus, on 5 January 1943, the SOL was granted autonomy and transformed into the Milice française (French Militia), created by a law issued by Pierre Laval under agreements with Pétain.

== See also ==
- François de Grossouvre
- Collaborationists

== Bibliography ==
- Jean-Paul Cointet, La légion française des Combattants, Albin Michel, Paris, 1995.
- Jean-Pierre Azéma et François Bedarida, Vichy et les Français, Paris, Fayard, 1996.
- Pierre Giolitto, Histoire de la Milice, Perrin, Paris, 2002.
- Jean Delperrié de Bayac, Histoire de la Milice (1918-1945), Fayard, Paris 1995.
