= French Legion of Veterans =

Paramilitary association in Vichy France

Insignia of the Legion, incorporating a Gallic winged helmet

The French Legion of Veterans (French: Légion française des combattants, or LFC) was a paramilitary association established in Vichy France and Vichy's colonial territories in World War II.

== Legion ==
Shortly after the French defeat, the newly established Vichy government inaugurated the French Legion of Veterans (Légion française des combattants) as a new unified association grouping French veterans of World War I. It superseded a large number of pre-war veterans federations which had often been structured around specified political platforms of their own. Membership was extended in December of the same year to include veterans of the 1940 campaign, although most were still being held as prisoners of war in Germany.

The Legion's remit was significantly expanded in August 1941. Non-veterans who sympathised with the Vichy region's project of "National Revolution" were permitted to join, and the legion was renamed the French Legion of Veterans and Volunteers of the National Revolution (Légion française des vétérans et des volontaires de la Révolution nationale).

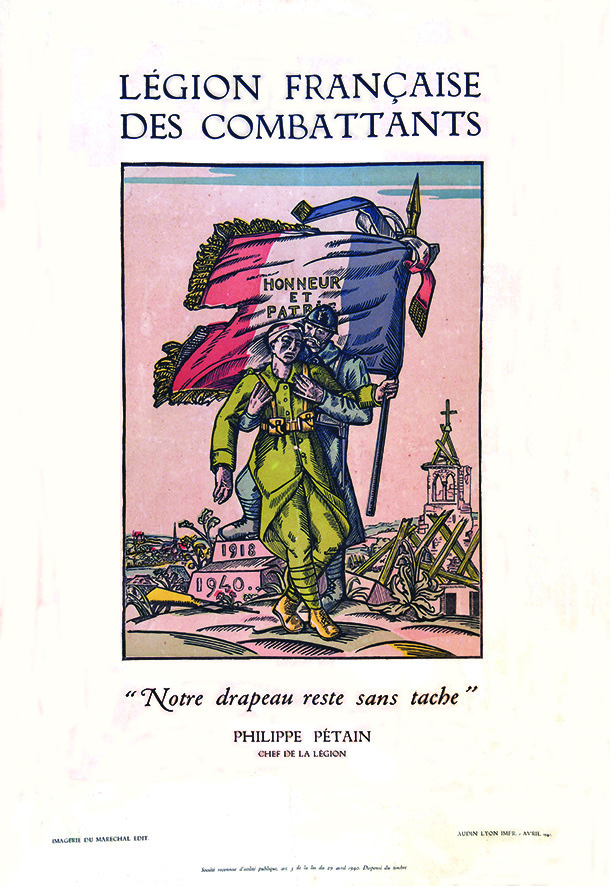
A Legion poster depicting a French soldier in a World War I uniform comforting a wounded soldier from the 1940 campaign

Marshall Philippe Pétain, chief of state, believed that the Legion was an important tool for the Vichy regime. He believed he had a particular rapport with other war veterans, having earned his reputation as commander at the Battle of Verdun in World War I. It may have been envisaged as a "single party" in a future authoritarian state after the end of the war.

The Legion claimed an overall membership of 1,600,000 at its peak. As well as metropolitan France, it had sections active in Vichy-controlled colonies in French North Africa, Indochina, and the Levant. As well as the main organisation, it also possessed a "supporters club" open to men and women called the Friends of the Legion (Amis de le Légion) and a youth movement called Young Legion (Jeune Légion) for male and female children aged 16 to 21.

According to the historian David Littlejohn, the Legion was a failure for the Vichy regime. "Unwieldy, ill-organized, and embracing far too wide a compass of political conviction from those who welcomed it as neo-fascist to those who saw it as a mass patriotic resistance movement, the Legion as a 'single party' was an abysmal failure."

== See also ==
- Service d'ordre légionnaire - a regional private militia created within the Legion in January 1942
- Chantiers de la jeunesse - a paramilitary youth movement in Vichy France
