= Échevis =

- Commune
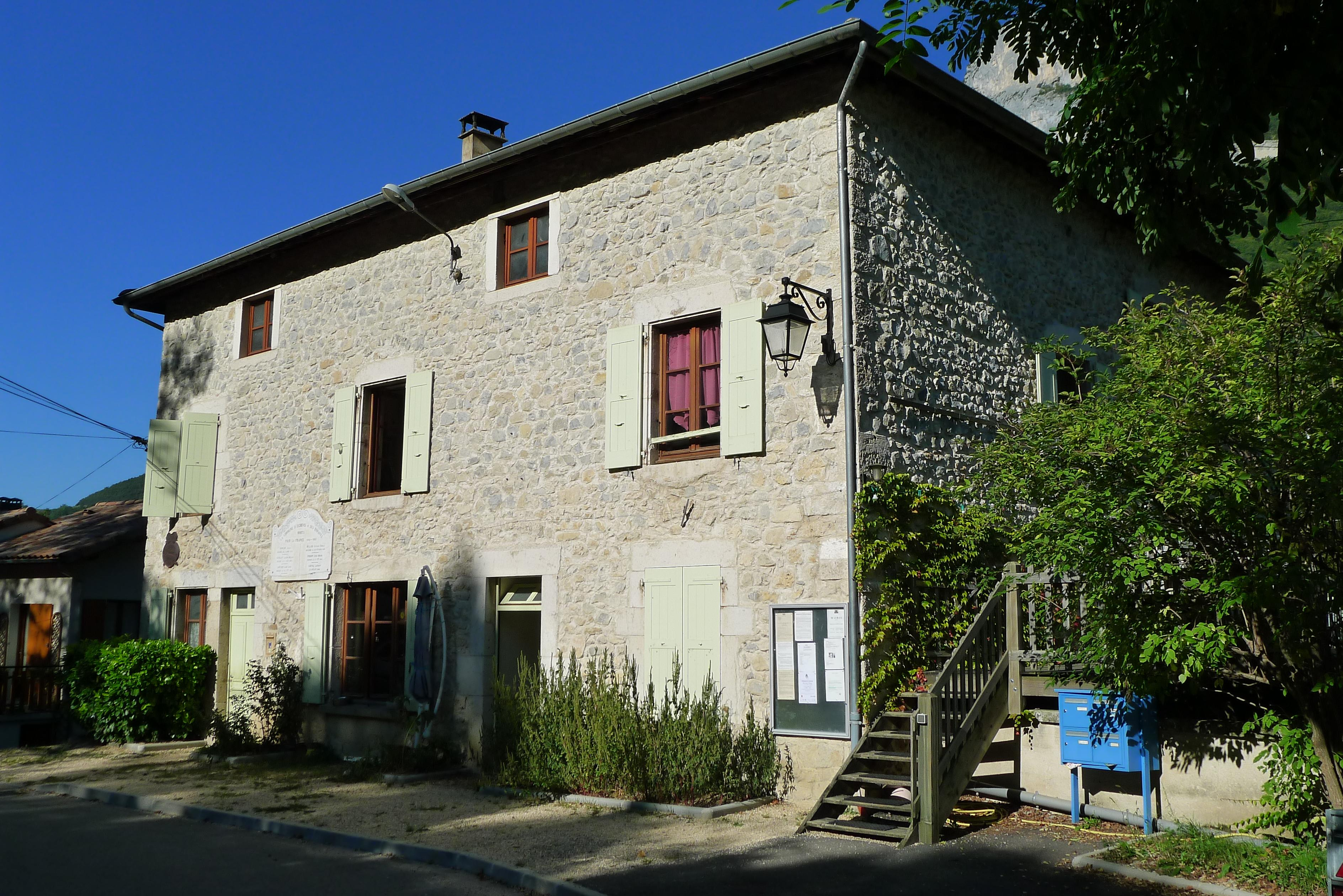
- Town hall
- Location of Échevis
- Location within France Location within Auvergne-Rhône-Alpes
- Coordinates: 45°01′41″N 5°23′06″E
- Country: France
- Region: Auvergne-Rhône-Alpes
- Department: Drôme
- Arrondissement: Die
- Canton: Vercors-Monts du Matin

Government
  - Mayor (2020–2026): Philippe Inard
- Area^{1}: 11.11 km^{2} (4.29 sq mi)
- Elevation: 339 m (1,112 ft)
- Highest elevation: 1,240 m (4,070 ft)
- Lowest elevation: 277 m (909 ft)
- Population (2023): 58
  - Density: 5.2/km^{2} (14/sq mi)
- Time zone: UTC+01:00 (CET)
  - Summer (DST): UTC+02:00 (CEST)
- INSEE/Postal code: 26117 /26190
- ^{1} French Land Register data, which excludes lakes, ponds, glaciers > 1 km^{2} (0.386 sq mi or 247 acres) and river estuaries.

Échevis is a commune in the Drôme department in the Auvergne-Rhône-Alpes region in southeastern France.

== Population ==
Historical population
Year	Pop.	±% p.a.
1968	41	—
1975	36	−1.84%
1982	47	+3.88%
1990	36	−3.28%
1999	52	+4.17%
2007	59	+1.59%
2012	52	−2.49%
2017	51	−0.39%
2023	58	+2.17%
Source: INSEE

== See also ==
- Communes of the Drôme department
- Parc naturel régional du Vercors
