= FTA =

FTA may refer to:

== Arts and media ==
- The Faery Tale Adventure, a computer game
- Festival TransAmériques, an annual dance and theater festival in Montreal, Quebec, Canada
- Free The Army tour, the F.T.A. Tour or F.T.A. Show, an American anti-Vietnam War road show for G.I.s, a play on the common troop expression "Fuck The Army"
  - F.T.A., a 1972 documentary about the road show
- Free-to-air, free satellite/TV channels
- FTA receiver, for receiving Free-to-Air Broadcasts

== Business and commerce ==
- Aruban Workers' Federation (Papiamento: Federación de Trabajadores Arubanos)
- Food, Tobacco, Agricultural, and Allied Workers, an American trade union
- Free trade area
- free trade agreement
  - List of bilateral free trade agreements
  - List of multilateral free trade agreements
- Freight Transport Association, a British trade association

== Mathematics ==
- Functional-theoretic algebra
- Fundamental theorem of algebra
- Fundamental theorem of arithmetic

== Transportation and vehicles ==
- Futuna Airport, in Vanuatu
- Frontier Flying Service, an American airline
- Federal Transit Administration, part of the United States Department of Transportation
- FTA, a Brazilian research rocket made by Fogtrein

== Other uses ==
- Face-threatening act, damaging someone's self esteem
- Failure to appear, non-appearance when summoned to a court etc.
- Fault tree analysis, system analysis methodology
- FTA paper (Fast Technology for Analysis (of nucleic acids)) is chemically treated to allow for the rapid isolation of pure DNA in room temperature stable condition, suitable for archival
- FTA-ABS, A diagnostic test for syphilis
- Future-oriented technology analysis, a collective term from futures studies

== See also ==
- FTV (disambiguation)
- FT (disambiguation)
