= Achille Pierre Deffontaines =

French general (1858–1914)

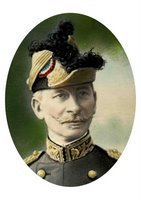
- Born: 16 February 1858; Bouvines, Nord, Second French Empire
- Died: 26 August 1914 (aged 56); Reims, Marne, French Third Republic
- Burial place: Bouvines, Nord
- Military career
- Allegiance: (French Third Republic) France
- Branch: French Army
- Service years: 1878–1914
- Rank: Général de brigade
- Conflicts: First World War; Battle of the Frontiers; Battle of the Ardennes (DOW)
- Awards: Chevalier of the Legion of Honour

Achille Pierre Deffontaines (16 February 1858 – 26 August 1914) was a French general. He served in various metropolitan infantry regiments before becoming a staff officer in several divisions and army corps. Deffontaines became the youngest general in France on his promotion to général de brigade in 1913. He led the 24th Infantry Division into action in Belgium in one of the opening battles of the First World War. Deffontaines was shot in the head while commanding his troops in the field on 22 August and died in hospital four days later. He was the youngest French general to die during the war.

== Early career ==
Born on 16 February 1858 at Bouvines, Deffontaines was from a family of farmers from the northern region. He joined the Ecole Spéciale Militaire de Saint-Cyr as an officer cadet on 30 October 1878. He was promoted to cadet first class on 22 December 1879 and to corporal on 21 March 1880. His graduation class was named for the Zulu race, which had recently fought in the Anglo-Zulu War, and he was commissioned into the 28th Infantry Regiment as a sous lieutenant (second lieutenant) on 10 October 1880.

Deffontaines saw active service on campaign in Africa from 9 October to 15 December 1882. Promoted to lieutenant in the 87th Infantry Regiment on 12 July 1884, he transferred to the 101st Infantry Regiment on 29 February 1888. He received promotion to capitaine (captain) on 12 July 1890 at which point he also became regimental adjutant. He served in this capacity until 20 November. The following year, he transferred to the 11th Infantry Regiment.

== Staff officer and general ==
Deffontaines became a staff officer with the 8th Infantry Division on 29 October 1891. He transferred to the same position with the 7th Infantry Division on 21 October 1892 and with the 10th Infantry Division on 6 June 1893. Deffontaines sought permission from his commanding officer to marry and did so, to Josephine, on 13 May 1893. He joined the staff of the 12th Army Corps on 31 August 1893, but left on 24 December 1894 to join the 63rd Infantry Regiment. Deffontaines was promoted to chef de bataillon (major) in the 8th Infantry Regiment on 17 April 1898 and joined the staff of 10th Army Corps on 23 November 1900. He was appointed a chevalier in the Legion of Honour on 29 December 1900. In 1913 he was promoted to the rank of général de brigade (brigadier general), becoming the youngest general in France at the time.

== First World War ==
Upon the outbreak of war Deffontaines had command of the 5th Infantry Brigade and was acting commander of the 24th Infantry Division. Whilst leading his division in the Battle of the Ardennes at Robelmont (near Meix-devant-Virton, Belgium) on 22 August he was shot in the head and grievously wounded. Deffontaines was one of 27,000 French soldiers to fall in battle that day and was taken to a military hospital in Reims. He died there on 26 August and would be the youngest French general to die in the war.

His son, Officer Cadet Jean Deffontaines, was also killed in action fighting with the 8th Infantry Division on 10 June 1915.

== Honors ==
Deffontaines was buried in a family tomb in Bouvines in 1921. The tomb was restored by Le Souvenir français, who installed a commemorative plaque, and unveiled on 22 August 2014 by General Guy Delamarre. The centenary of his death was commemorated in Bouvines and the Fort de Seclin also maintains a memorial in his honor.

A rough interpretation of Le Souvenir français's article on his commemoration notes the sad irony of his early passing: "One could also call him 'General Forgotten.' Killed in action too early to be in the annals of the great war and yet what a man, what a career and what a temperament. Fate, the mission and example symbolized in this general who is a tribute to all sacrificed in the First World War."
