= Renault FT =

French light tank

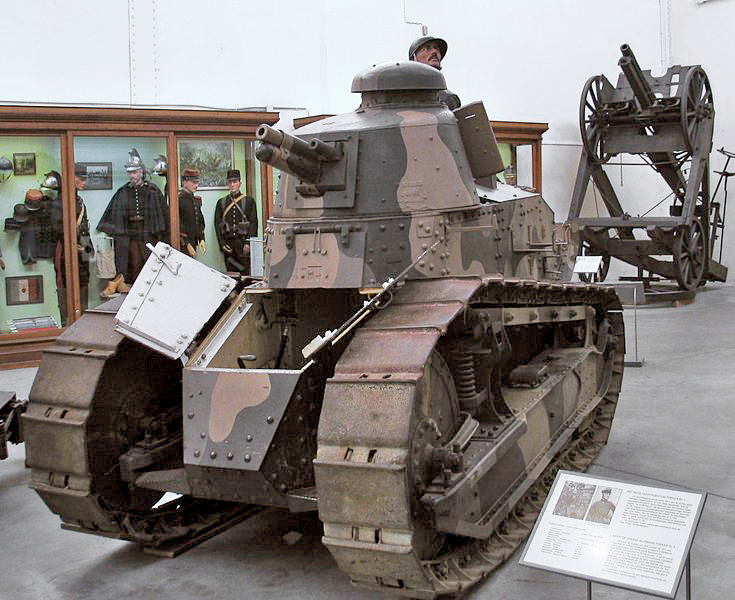
- FT with Girod turret at Royal Museum of the Armed Forces, Belgium
- Type: Light tank
- Place of origin: French Third Republic

Service history
- In service: 1917–c. 1989
- Used by: See Operators
- Wars: World War I; Russian Civil War; Estonian War of Independence; Turkish War of Independence; Polish-Soviet War; Warlord Era; Rif War; São Paulo Revolt of 1924; Great Syrian Revolt; Revolution of 1930; Brazilian Constitutionalist War; Chinese Civil War; Spanish Civil War; Winter War; World War II; Franco-Thai War; Soviet–Afghan War

Production history
- Designer: Louis Renault and Rodolphe Ernst-Metzmaier
- Designed: 1916
- Manufacturer: Renault; Berliet; Somua; Delaunay-Belleville
- Produced: 1917–1919
- No. built: +3,000, 2,622 by France
- Variants: Char canon; Char mitrailleuse; FT 75 BS; Char signal; FT modifié 31; US M1917; Russkiy Reno; Anti Char

Specifications
- Mass: 6.5 tonnes (6.4 long tons; 7.2 short tons)
- Length: 4.10 m (13 ft 5 in) or 5.00 m (16 ft 5 in) with tail
- Width: 1.74 m (5 ft 9 in)
- Height: 2.14 m (7 ft 0 in)
- Crew: 2 (commander, driver)
- Armor: 8 to 22 mm (0.31 to 0.87 in)
- Main armament: Puteaux SA 1918 37 mm gun or 8 mm Hotchkiss machine gun Reibel machine gun (FT 31)
- Engine: Renault 4-cyl, 4.5 litre, thermo-siphon water-cooled; Gasoline (petrol) pump; Engine oil pump; Zenith preset carburettor; Magneto ignition 39 hp (29 kW) at 1500 rpm
- Power/weight: 5 hp/t (3.7 kW/t)
- Transmission: sliding gear; four speeds forward, one reverse. One main clutch plus two subsidiary clutches (one for each of the two tracks) used for steering the tank.
- Suspension: vertical springs
- Fuel capacity: 95 litres (about 8 hours)
- Operational range: 60 km (37 mi)
- Maximum speed: 7 km/h (4.3 mph)

The Renault FT (frequently referred to in post-World War I literature as the FT-17, FT17, or similar) is a French light tank that was among the most revolutionary and influential tank designs in history. The FT was the first production tank to have its armament within a fully rotating turret. (Note: Although a rotating turret had been a feature of some earlier tank designs or prototypes, and had been incorporated in armoured cars for several years, no tank with a turret had entered service.) The Renault FT's configuration (crew compartment at the front, engine compartment at the back, and main armament in a revolving turret) became and remains the standard tank layout. Consequently, some armoured warfare historians have called the Renault FT the world's first modern tank.

Over 3,000 Renault FT tanks were manufactured by France, most of them in 1918. After World War I, FT tanks were exported in large numbers. Copies and derivative designs were manufactured in the United States (M1917 light tank), in Italy (Fiat 3000), and in the Soviet Union (T-18 tank). The Renault FT saw combat during the interwar conflicts around the world but was considered obsolete at the outbreak of World War II.

== Development ==
The FT was designed and produced by the Société des Automobiles Renault (Renault Automobile Company).

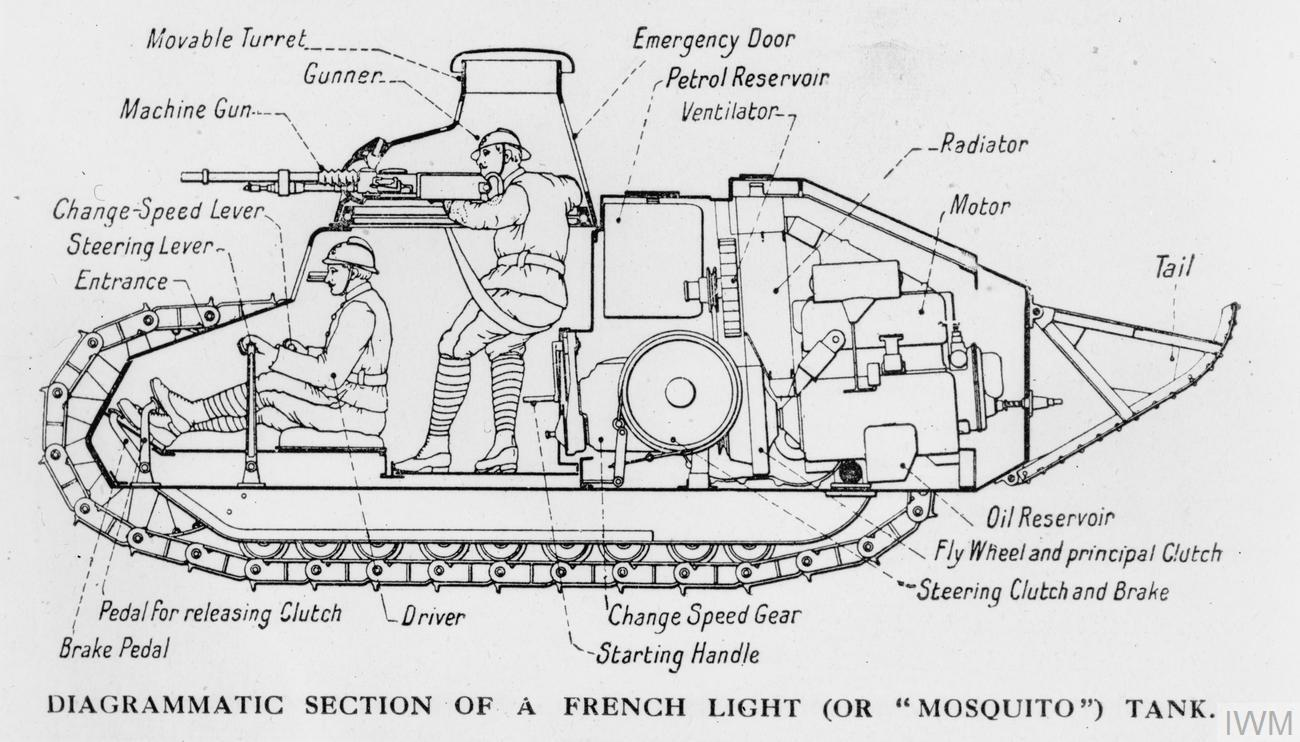
FT Char Mitrailleuse layout (with first-pattern turret)

It is thought possible that Louis Renault began working on the idea as early as 21 December 1915, after a visit from Colonel J. B. E. Estienne. Estienne had drawn up plans for a tracked armoured vehicle based on the Holt caterpillar tractor, and with permission from General Joffre, approached Renault as a possible manufacturer. Renault declined, saying that his company was operating at full capacity producing war materiel and that he had no experience of tracked vehicles. Estienne later discovered that the Schneider company was working on a tracked armoured vehicle, which became France's first operational tank, the Schneider CA.

At a later, chance meeting with Renault on 16 July 1916, Estienne asked him to reconsider, which he did, favourably.

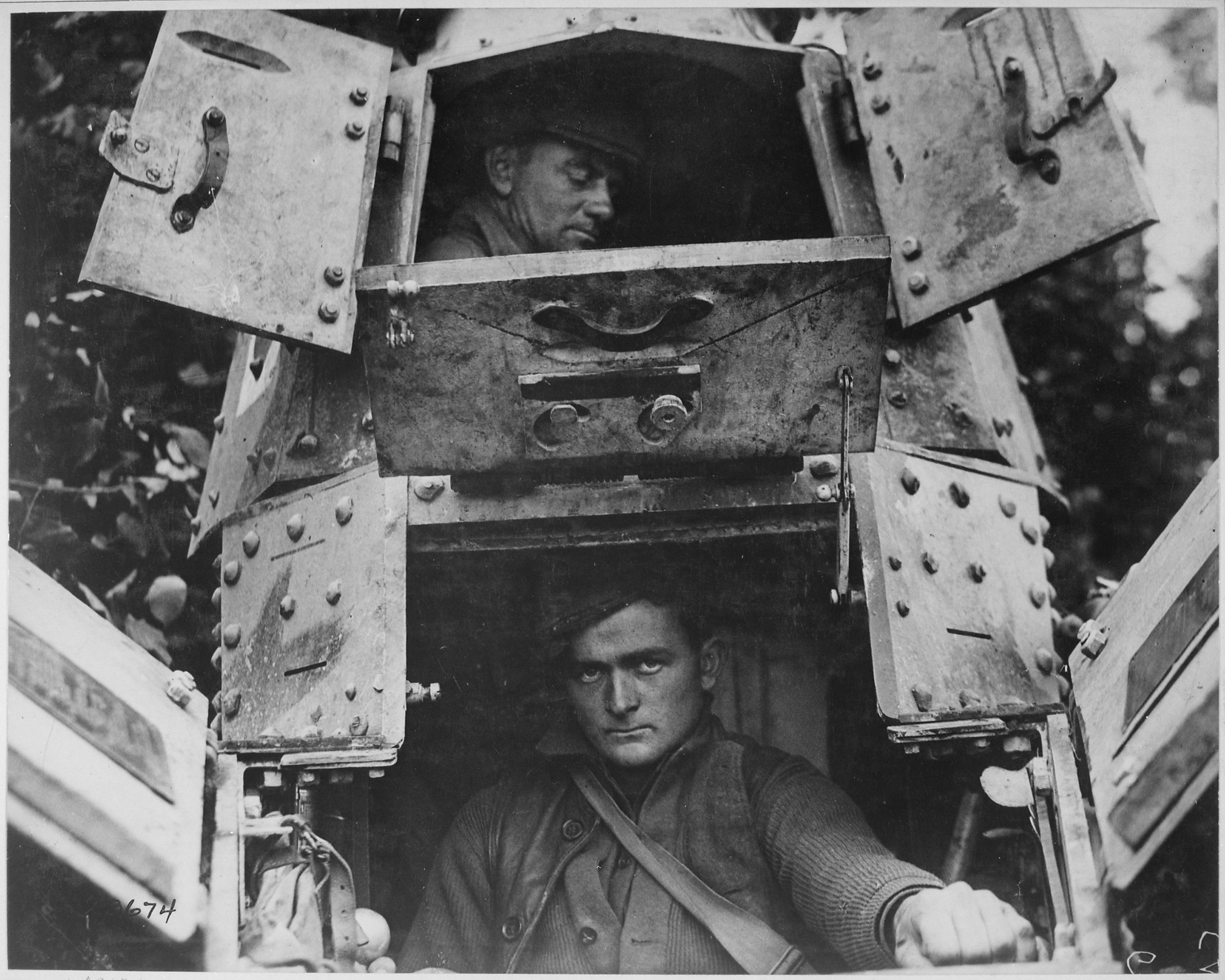
Crew locations shown with hatches open (turret reversed)

Louis Renault himself conceived the new tank's overall design and set its basic specifications. He imposed a 7-ton limit to the FT's projected weight. Renault was unconvinced that a sufficient power-to-weight ratio could be achieved with the production engines available at the time to give sufficient mobility to the heavy tank types requested by the military. Renault's industrial designer Rodolphe Ernst-Metzmaier generated the FT's execution plans. Charles-Edmond Serre, a long-time associate of Louis Renault, organized and supervised the new tank's mass production. The FT's tracks were kept automatically under tension to prevent derailments, while a rounded tailpiece facilitated the crossing of trenches. Because the engine had been designed to function normally under any slant, very steep slopes could be negotiated by the Renault FT without loss of power. Effective internal ventilation was provided by the engine's radiator fan, which drew its air through the front crew compartment of the tank and forced it out through the rear engine's compartment.

Renault encountered some early difficulties in getting his proposal fully supported by Estienne. After the first British use of heavy tanks on 15 September 1916 during the Battle of the Somme, the French military still pondered whether a large number of light tanks would be preferable to a smaller number of super-heavy tanks (the later Char 2C). On 27 November 1916, Estienne sent to the French Commander in Chief a personal memorandum proposing the immediate adoption and mass manufacture of a light tank based on the specifications of the Renault prototype. After receiving two large government orders for the FT tank, one in April 1917 and the other in June 1917, Renault was able to proceed. His design remained in competition with the super-heavy Char 2C until the end of the war.

The prototype was refined during the second half of 1917, but the Renault FT remained plagued by radiator fan belt problems throughout the war. Only 84 were produced in 1917, but 2,697 were delivered to the French army before the Armistice.

=== Naming ===
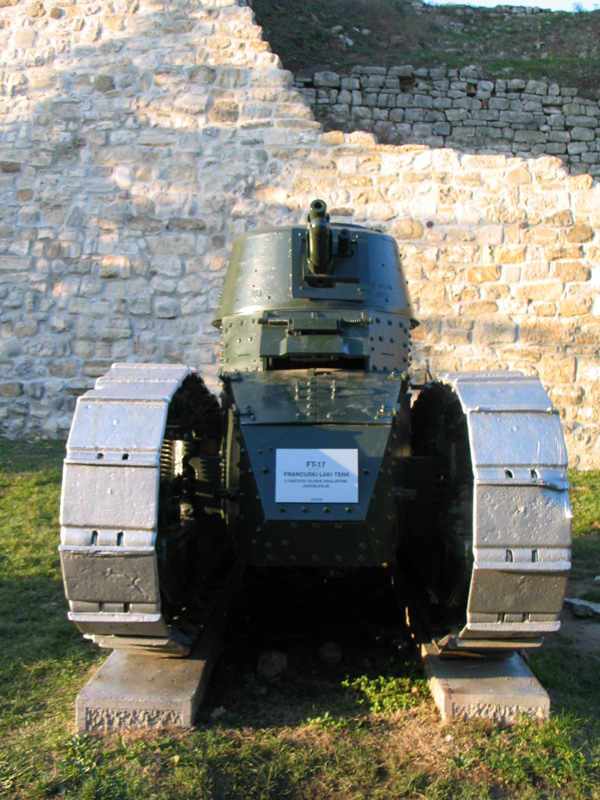
FT at the Belgrade Military Museum, Serbia

Although it has sometimes been stated that the letters FT stand for the French terms faible tonnage (low tonnage), faible taille (small size), franchisseur de tranchées (trench crosser), or force terrestre (land force), none of these names are correct. Neither was it named the FT 17 or FT-17. The name is derived from the two-letter production code that all new Renault projects were given for internal use: the one available was 'FT'.

The prototype was at first referred to as the automitrailleuse à chenilles Renault FT modèle 1917. Automitrailleuse à chenilles means "armoured car [lit: motorized machine gun] with tracks." By this stage of the war, automitrailleuse was the standard word for an armoured car, but by the time the FT was designed there were two other types of French tank in existence, and the term char d'assaut (from the French char – a cart or wagon, and assaut; attack or assault), soon shortened to char, had at the insistence of Colonel Estienne, already been adopted by the French and was in common use. Once orders for the vehicle had been secured it was the practice at Renault to refer to it as the "FT". The vehicle was originally intended to carry a machine-gun, and was therefore described as a char mitrailleur – mitrailleur (from mitraille; grapeshot) had by this time come to mean "machine-gunner".

Many sources, predominantly English language accounts, refer to the FT as the "FT 17" or "FT-17." This term is not contemporary and appears to have arisen post World War One. In Estienne's biography, his granddaughter states, "It is also referred to as the FT 17: the number 17 was added after the war in history books, since it was always referred to at Renault as the FT." Lieutenant-Colonel Paul Malmassari (French tank officer and Doctor of History) states, "The Renault tank never carried the name FT 17 during the First World War, although the initials F.T. seem to appear in August 1917." Some confusion might also have been caused by the fact that the American version of the vehicle, produced in the US under licence from Renault, was designated the M1917. When it was decided to equip the FTs with either cannon or machine-guns, the cannon version was designated char canon (cannon tank), and the latter, in accordance with French grammar, renamed char mitrailleuse (machine-gun tank).

It is frequently claimed that some of these tanks were designated FT 18. Reasons given for the claim include: it distinguished tanks produced in 1918 from those of 1917; it was applied to FTs armed with cannon as opposed to those with machine-guns; it distinguished FTs with a cast, rounded turret from those with a hexagonal one; it referred to the 18 horsepower engine; it indicated a version to which various modifications had been made.

Renault records make no distinction between 1917 and 1918 output; the decision to arm FTs with a 37mm gun was made in April 1917, before any tanks had been manufactured; because of various production difficulties and design requirements, a range of turret types were produced by several manufacturers, but they were all fitted to the basic FT body without any distinguishing reference; all FTs had the same model 18 hp engine. The Renault manual of April 1918 is entitled RENAULT CHAR D'ASSAUT 18 HP, and the illustrations are of the machine-gun version. The official designation was not changed until the 1930s when the FT was fitted with a 1931 Reibel machine gun and renamed the FT modifié 31. By this time, the French Army was equipped with several other Renault models and it had become necessary to distinguish between the various types.

== Production ==
=== France ===
About half of all FTs were manufactured in Renault's factory at Boulogne-Billancourt near Paris, with the remainder subcontracted to other companies. Of the original order for 3,530, Renault accounted for 1,850 (52%), Berliet 800 (23%), SOMUA (a subsidiary of Schneider & Cie) 600 (17%), and Delaunay-Belleville 280 (8%). When the order was increased to 7,820 in 1918, production was distributed in roughly the same proportion. Louis Renault agreed to waive royalties for all French manufacturers of the FT.

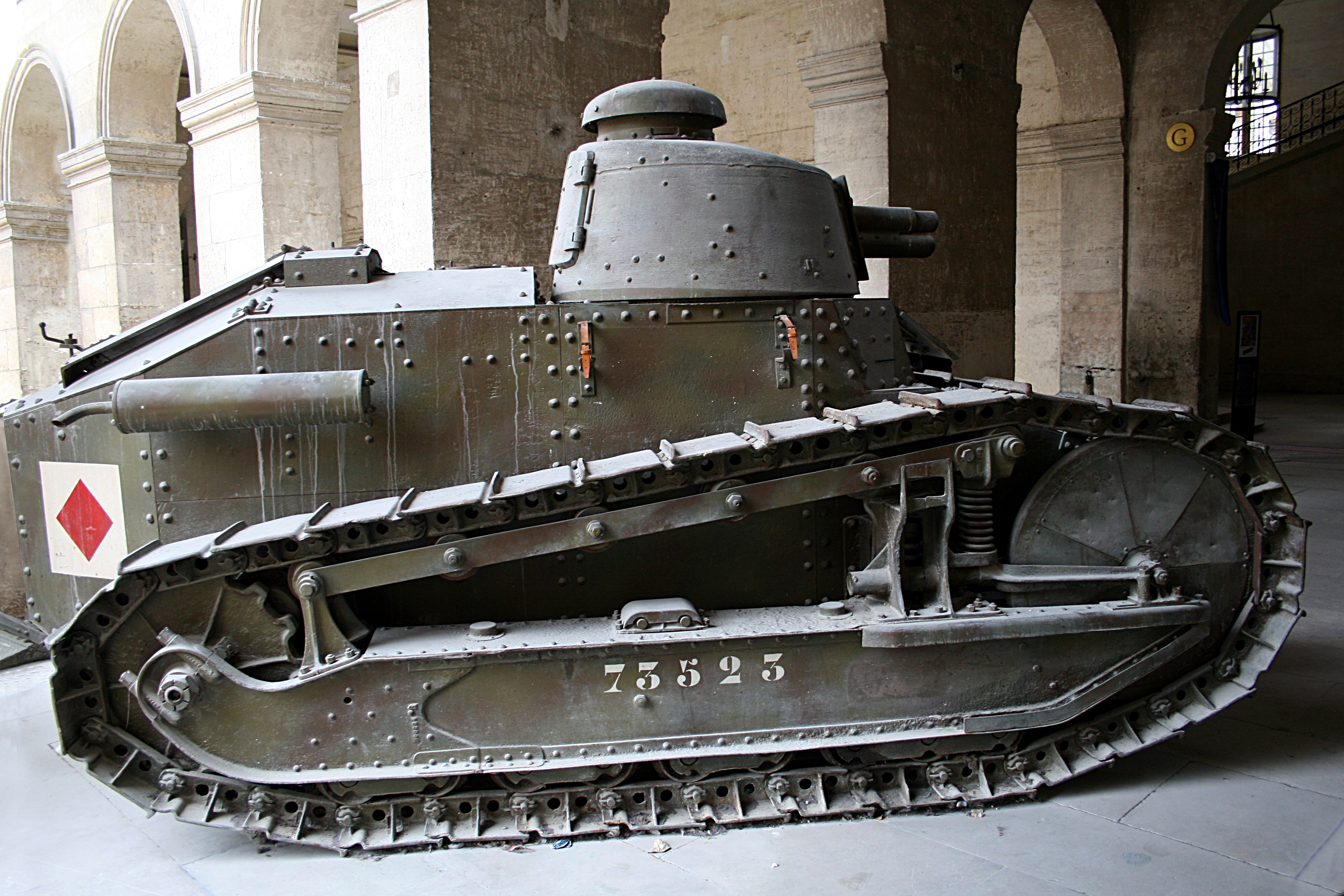
French Renault FT in the Army Museum, Paris

=== United States ===
When the US entered the war in April 1917, its army was short of heavy materiel and had no tanks at all. Because of the wartime demands on French industry, it was decided that the quickest way to supply the American forces with sufficient armour was to manufacture the FT in the US. A requirement of 4,400 of a modified version, the M1917, was decided on, with delivery expected to begin in April 1918. By June 1918, US manufacturers had failed to produce any, and delivery dates were put back until September. France therefore agreed to lend 144 FTs, enough to equip two battalions. No M1917s reached the American Expeditionary Forces (AEF) until the war was over.

== Turret ==
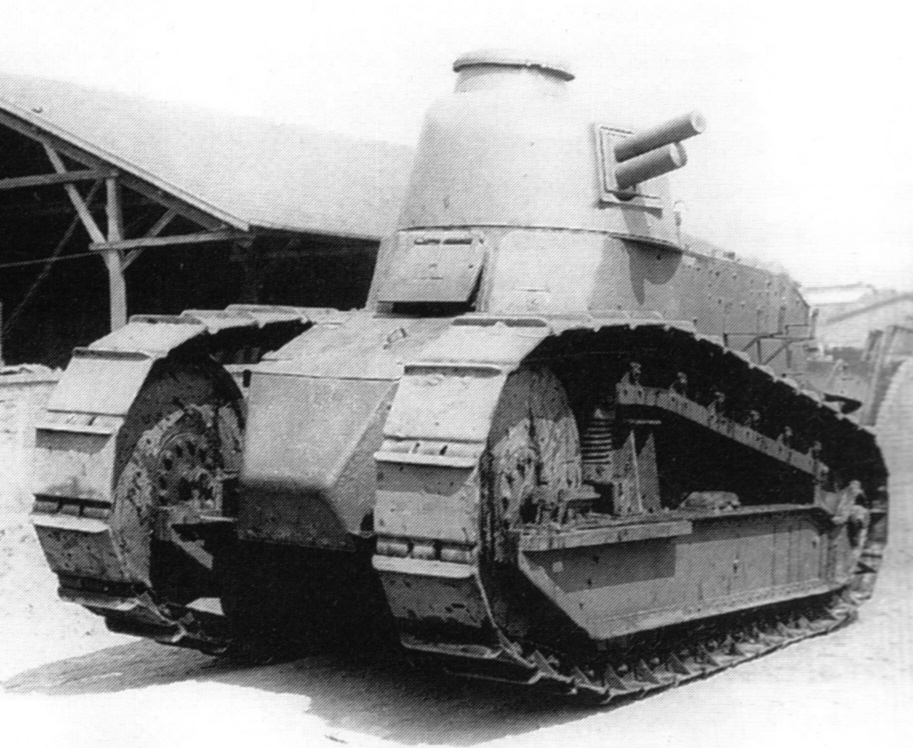
First mock-up of the canon turret, mounted on the FT prototype. The gun is a wooden dummy.

The first turret designed for the FT was a circular, cast steel version almost identical to that of the prototype. It was designed to carry a Hotchkiss 8mm machine gun. In April 1917 Estienne decided for tactical reasons that some vehicles should be capable of carrying a small cannon. The 37mm Puteaux gun was chosen, and attempts were made to produce a cast steel turret capable of accommodating it, but they were unsuccessful. The first 150 FTs were for training only, and made of non-hardened steel plus the first model of turret. Meanwhile, the Berliet Company had produced a new design, a polygonal turret of riveted plate, which was simpler to produce than the early cast steel turret. It was given the name "omnibus", since it could easily be adapted to mount either the Hotchkiss machine gun or the Puteaux 37mm with its telescopic sight. This turret was fitted to production models in large numbers. In 1918 Forges et aciéries Paul Girod produced a successful circular turret which was mostly cast with some rolled parts. The Girod turret was also an "omnibus" design. Girod supplied it to all the companies producing the FT, and in the later stages of the war it became more commonplace than the Berliet turret. The turret sat on a circular ball-bearing race, and could easily be rotated by the gunner/commander or be locked in position with a handbrake.

== Service history ==
=== World War I ===
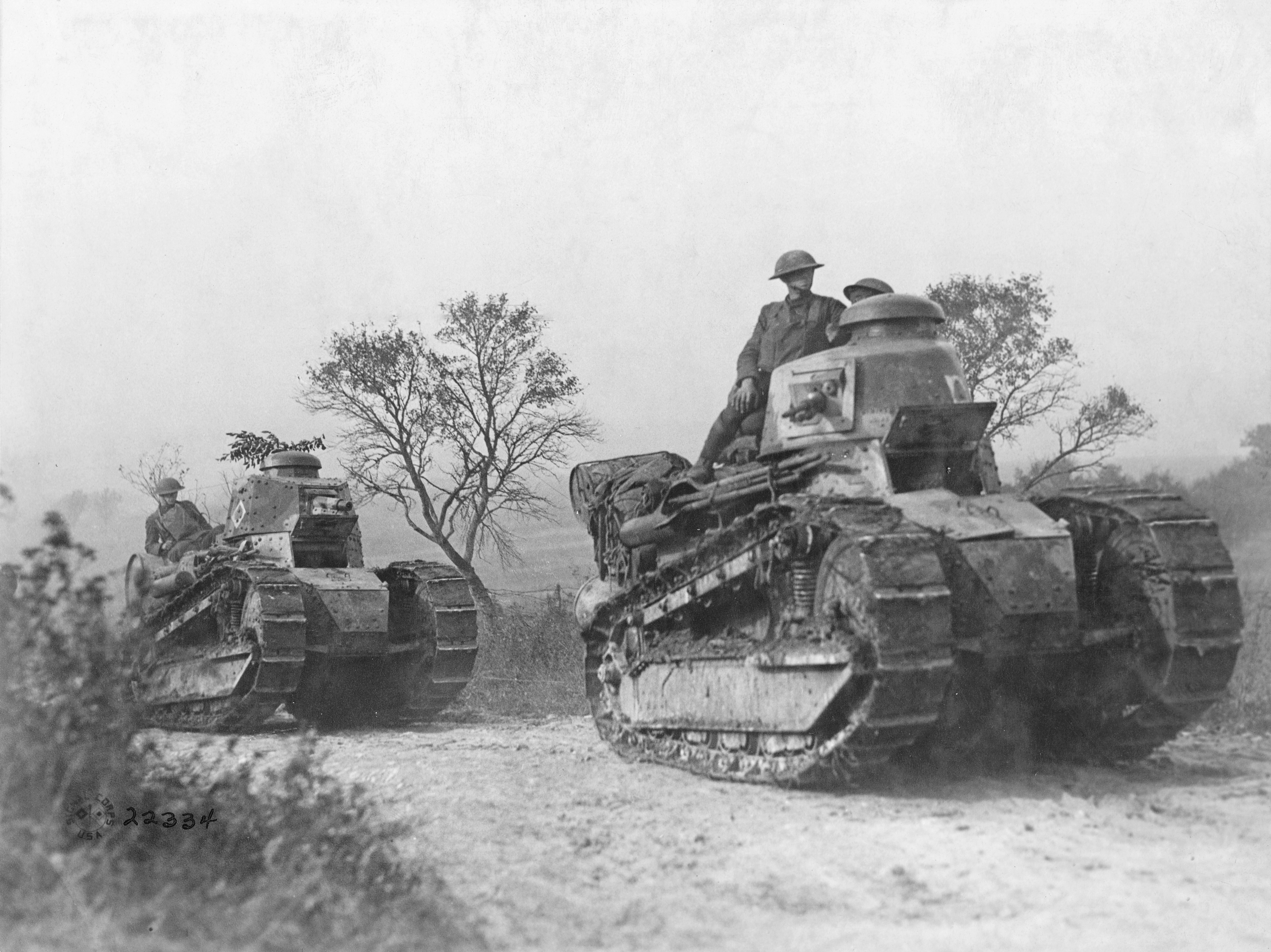
US Army operating FTs on the Western Front, 1918

The Renault FT was widely used by French forces in 1918 and by the American Expeditionary Forces (AEF) on the Western Front in the closing stages of World War I.

Its battlefield debut occurred on 31 May 1918, east of the Forest of Retz, east of Chaudun, between Ploisy and Chazelles, during the Third Battle of the Aisne. This engagement, with 30 tanks, successfully broke up a German advance, but in the absence of infantry support, the vehicles later withdrew. From then on, gradually increasing numbers of FTs were deployed, together with smaller numbers of the older Schneider CA1 and Saint-Chamond tanks. As the war had become a war of movement during mid-1918, during the Hundred Days Offensive, the lighter FTs were often transported on heavy trucks and special trailers rather than by rail on flat cars. Estienne had initially proposed to overwhelm the enemy defences using a "swarm" of light tanks, a tactic that was eventually successfully implemented. Beginning in late 1917, the Entente allies were attempting to outproduce the Central Powers in all respects, including artillery, tanks, and chemical weapons. Consequently, a goal was set of manufacturing 12,260 FT tanks (7,820 in France and 4,440 in the United States) before the end of 1919. It played a leading role in the offensives of 1918, when it received the popular name "Victory Tank".

The British Army used 24 FTs for command and liaison duties, usually with the gun removed.

Italy received 3 FTs in June 1918, but they did not see action and no other tanks were received until the end of the war.

=== Interwar period ===
After the end of World War I, Renault FTs were exported to many countries, including Belgium, Brazil, Czechoslovakia, Estonia, Finland, Iran, Japan, Lithuania, the Netherlands, Poland, Romania, Spain, Switzerland, Turkey, and Yugoslavia. Renault FT tanks were used by most nations having armoured forces, generally as their prominent tank type.

They were used in anti-Soviet conflicts such as the Russian Civil War and Polish-Soviet War. On 5 February 1920, Estonia purchased nine vehicles from France.

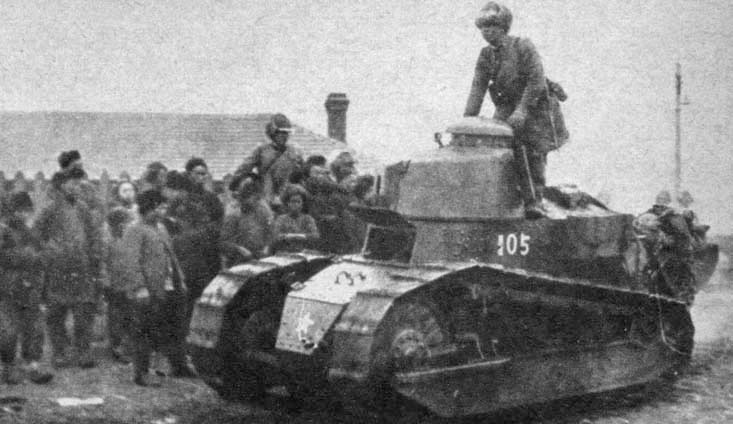
Japanese FT-Ko tank in Manchuria, 1932

French tanks deployed in Vladivostok were given to the Chinese Fengtian Army of Zhang Zuolin in 1919. 14 more Renaults were bought in 1924 and 1925. These tanks saw action to protect the border from the Soviets in the 1920s and against the warlord Wu Peifu in 1926. After the Japanese invasion of Manchuria, nearly all were handed over to the Manchukuo Imperial Army.

Renault tanks were also used in colonial conflicts, for instance crushing a revolt in Italian Libya in 1919. The French Army sent a company of FT tanks to Syria during the Great Druze Revolt. In Brazil, the FT tanks were used by the Old Republic to crush various revolts between 1924 and 1927 and by Vargas forces against the Constitutionalist Revolution.

During the Rif War, after the Battle of Annual, the Spanish Army ordered 10 FT armed with Hotchkiss machine guns and 1 char TSF to supplement a first Renault bought in 1919. These tanks formed a company deployed from 1921. After a first failure, they proved to be very effective and six more were delivered in 1925. The Spanish FT were the first tanks in history to take part in an amphibious assault, the Alhucemas landing. The French Army deployed two battalions of FT during the war, including one company of FT tanks with Kégresse tracks. After the end of the war, the French tanks remained in North Africa to finish the "pacification" of Morocco in the Atlas Mountains. When the Spanish Civil War broke, half of the Renault crews remained loyal to the Spanish Republic while the others joined the rebels. France later sent 32 FTs to the Republicans; the number of FTs sold to the Republicans by Poland is unclear; estimates vary between 16 and 94.

=== World War II and after ===
Renault FT tanks were also fielded in limited numbers during World War II, in Poland, Finland, France, Romania and the Kingdom of Yugoslavia, although they were already obsolete. In May 1940, the French Army still had seven front-line battalions, each equipped with 63 FTs, one under-strength battalion as well as three independent companies, each with 10, for a total organic strength of 504. 105 more were in service in the colonies of Morocco and Algeria and 58 in French Levant, Madagascar and Indochina. Some FT tanks had also been buried within the ground and encased in concrete to supplement the Maginot Line.

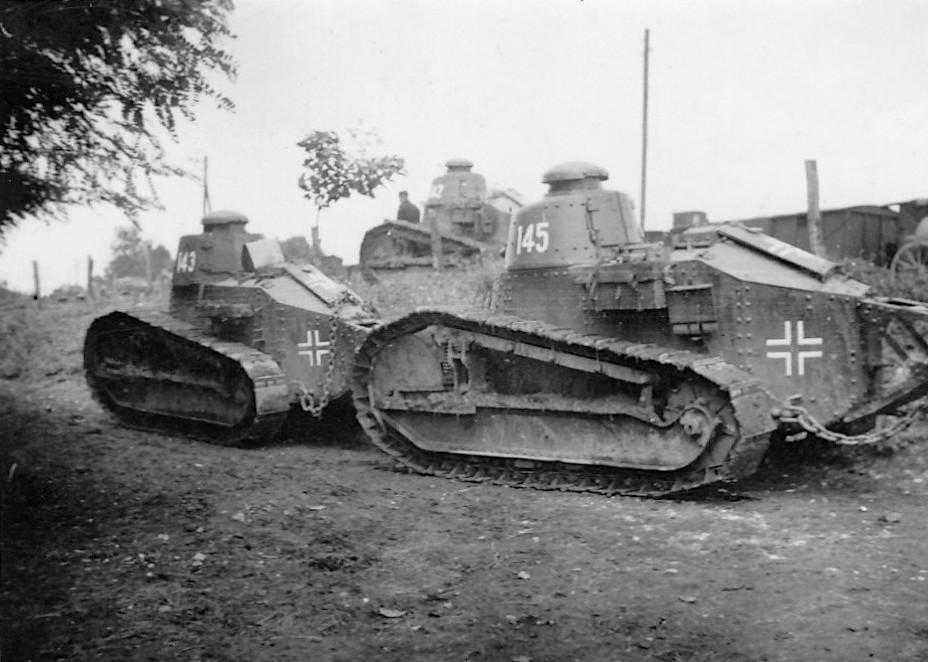
Captured FT tanks in German service in Serbia (World War II)

The fact that several units used the Renault FT gave rise to the popular myth that the French had no modern equipment at all; actually, they had as many modern tanks as the Germans; however, the majority had one-man turrets and were less efficient than German tanks such as the Panzer III and IV. The French suffered from strategic and tactical weaknesses rather than from equipment deficiencies, although many of the French tanks were also markedly slow (unlike the German tanks of the time). When the best French units were cut off by the German drive to the English Channel, around 390 FTs, previously used for training or stored in depots, joined the 184 to 192 FTs in service with internal security units. The Wehrmacht captured 1,704 FTs. They used about 100 for airfield defence and about 650 for patrolling occupied Europe. Some were used by the Germans in 1944 for street-fighting in Paris, but by this time they were hopelessly out of date.

Vichy France used Renault FTs against Allied invasion forces during Operation Torch in Morocco and Algeria. The French tanks were no match for the newly arrived American M4 Sherman and M3 Stuart tanks. French Army FTs saw combat deployment during the Japanese invasion of French Indochina and the Franco-Thai War in the period from September 1940 to January 1941.

The last known use was in the 1980s during the Soviet–Afghan War, when some FTs were used as pillboxes or roadblocks.

In 2003, derelict former Afghan military Renault FTs were found by US occupation forces in Afghanistan.

=== Derivatives ===
The FT was the ancestor of a long line of French tank, beginning with FT tanks equipped with modernized suspension, such as the FT Kégresse and the Renault NC. The NC eventually evolved into the Char D1 with the NC3, in turn into the Char D2.

Renault FT Kégresse

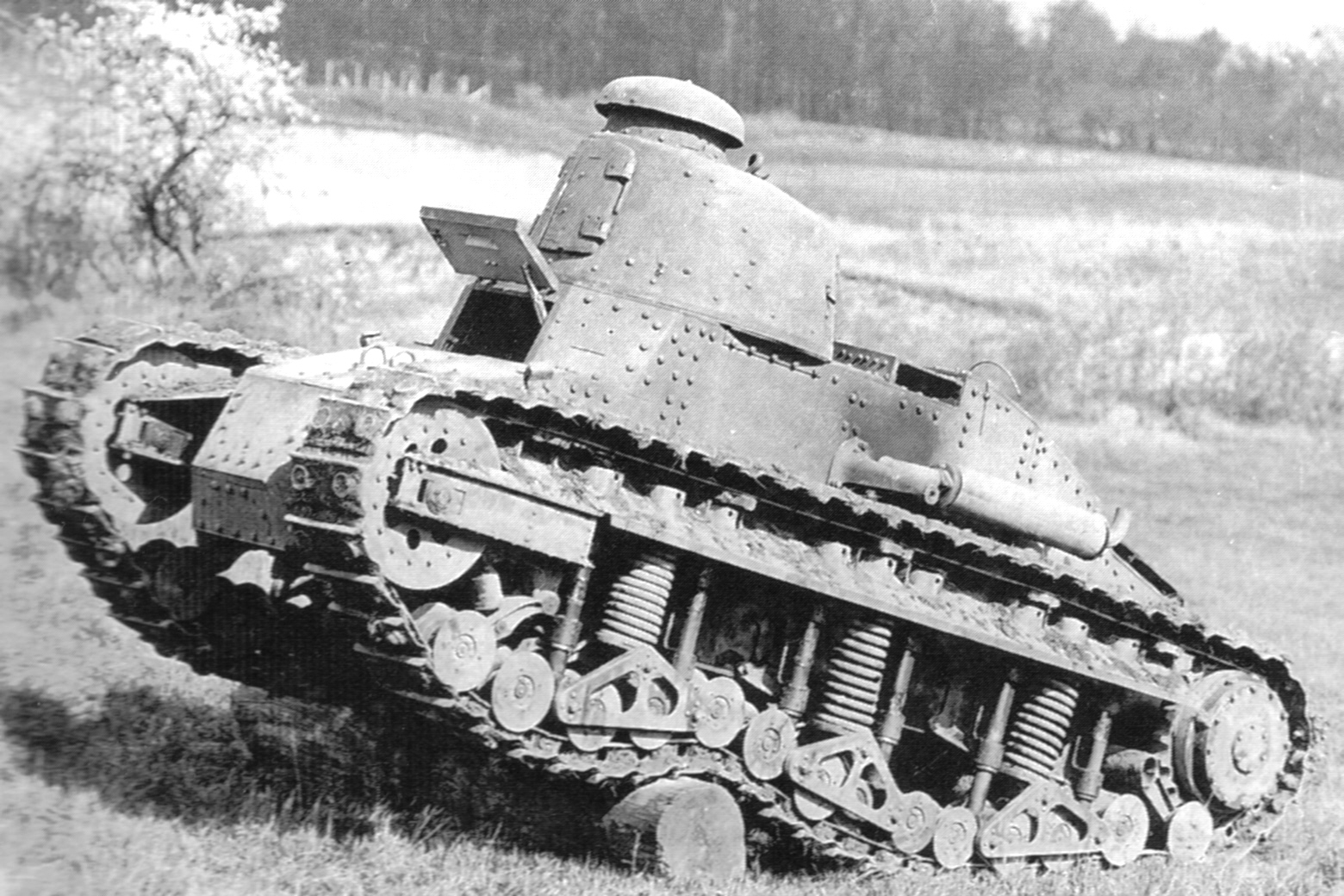
Renault NC-1 (NC-27)

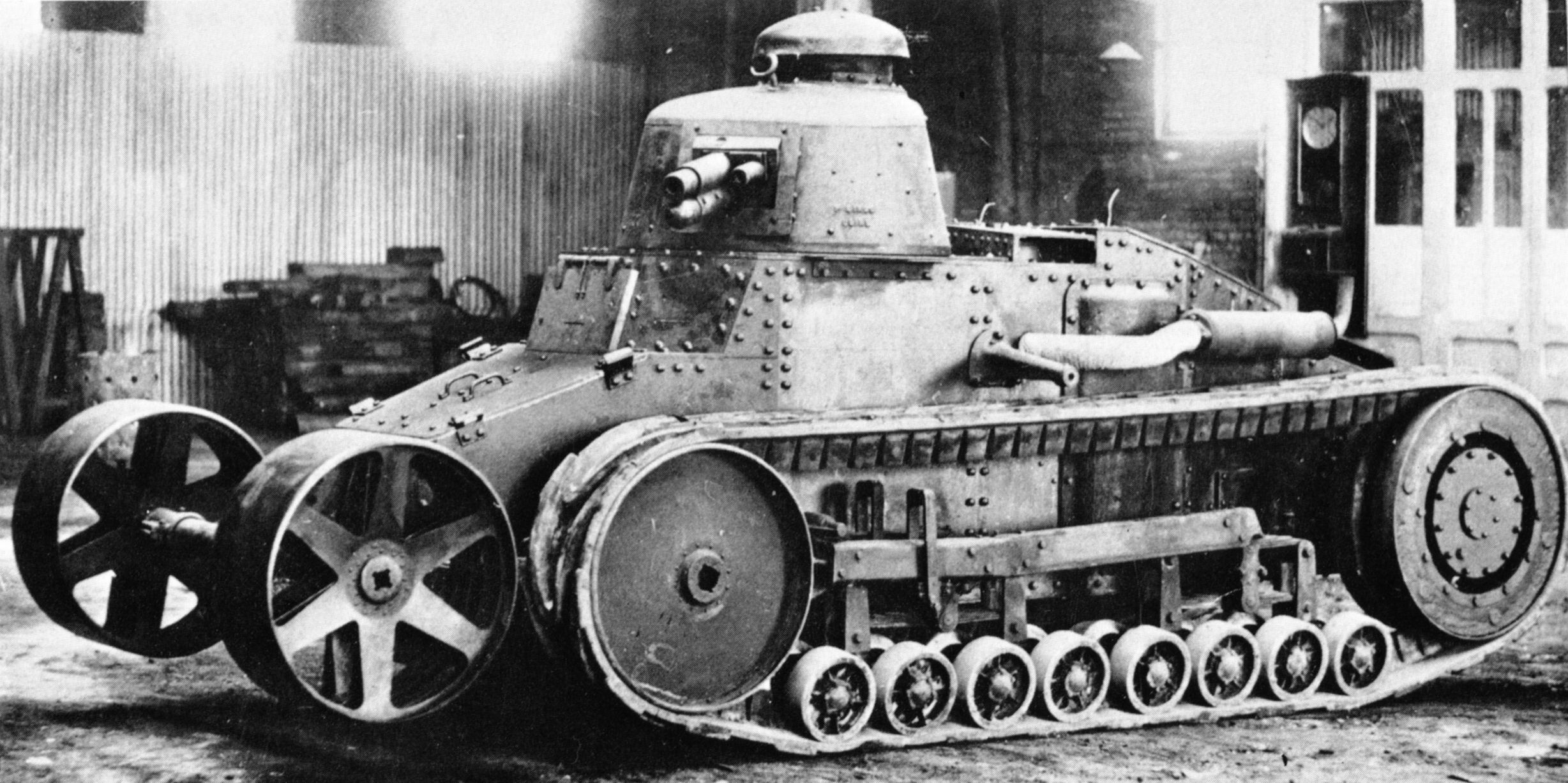
Renault NC-2

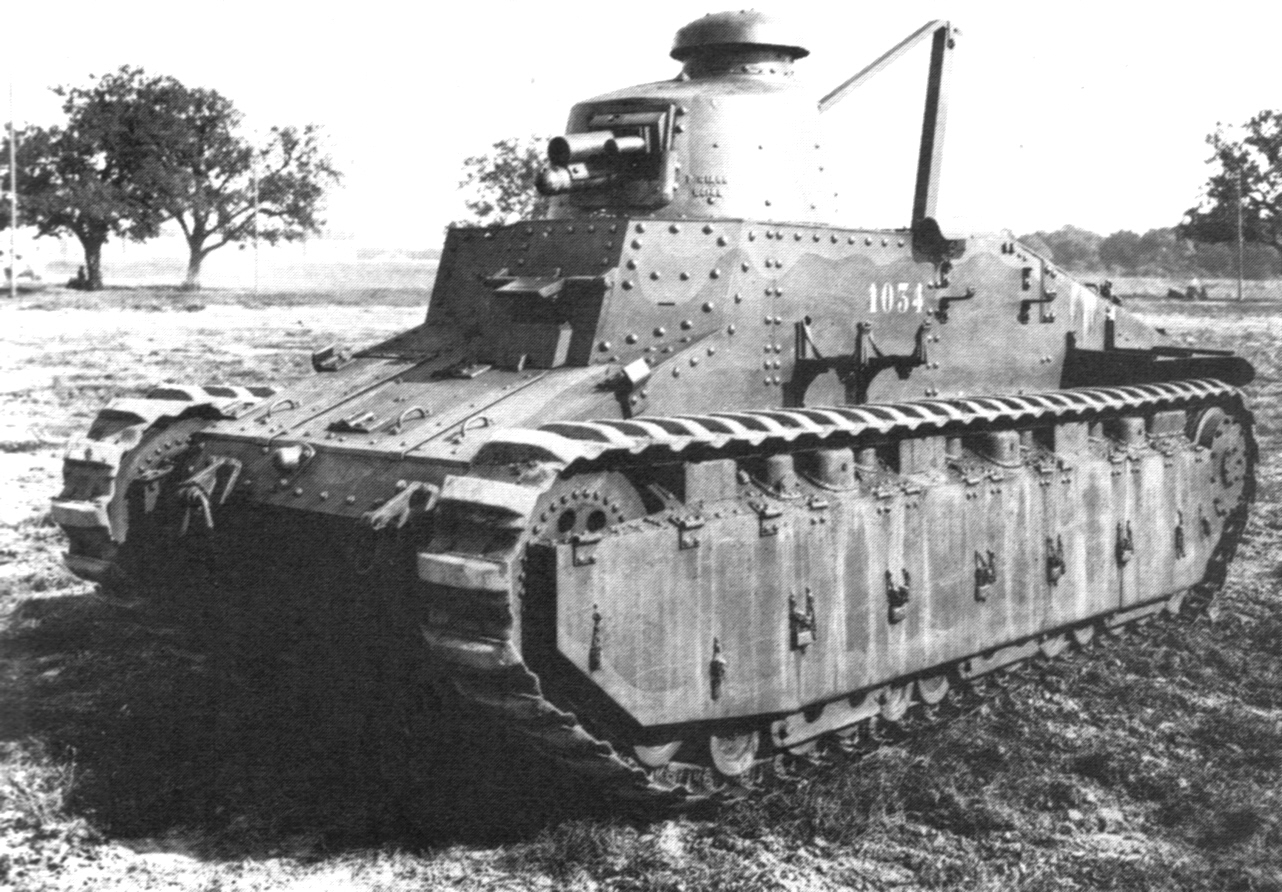
Renault NC-3 (NC-31)

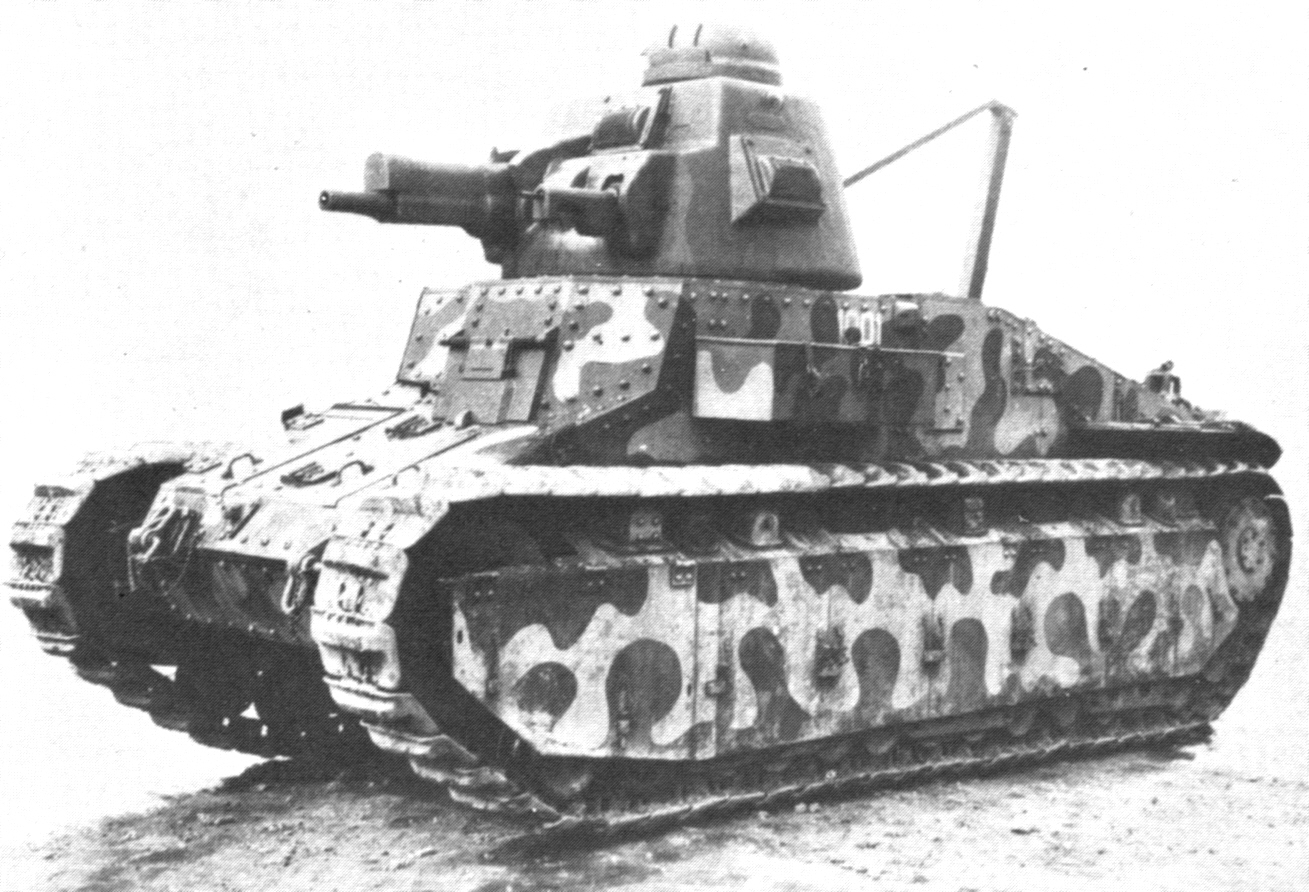
Char D1

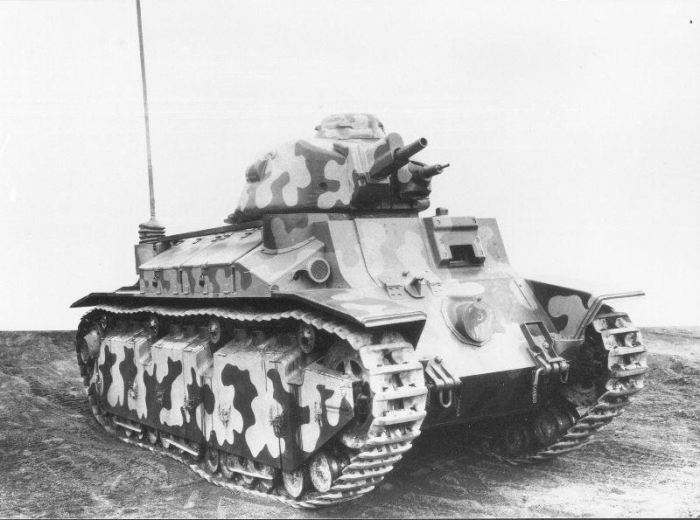
Char D2

The Soviet Red Army captured 14 burnt-out Renaults from White Russian forces and rebuilt them at the Krasnoye Sormovo Factory in 1920. Nearly 15 exact copies, called "Russkiy Reno", were produced in 1920–1922, but they were never used in battle because of many technical problems. In 1928–1931, the first completely Soviet-designed tank was the T-18, a derivative of the Renault with sprung suspension.

The Italians produced the FIAT 3000, a moderately close copy of the FT, as their standard tank.

Copy of "Russkiy Reno" (Nizhny Novgorod)

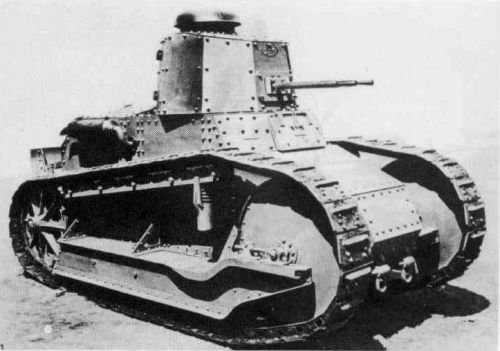
FIAT 3000

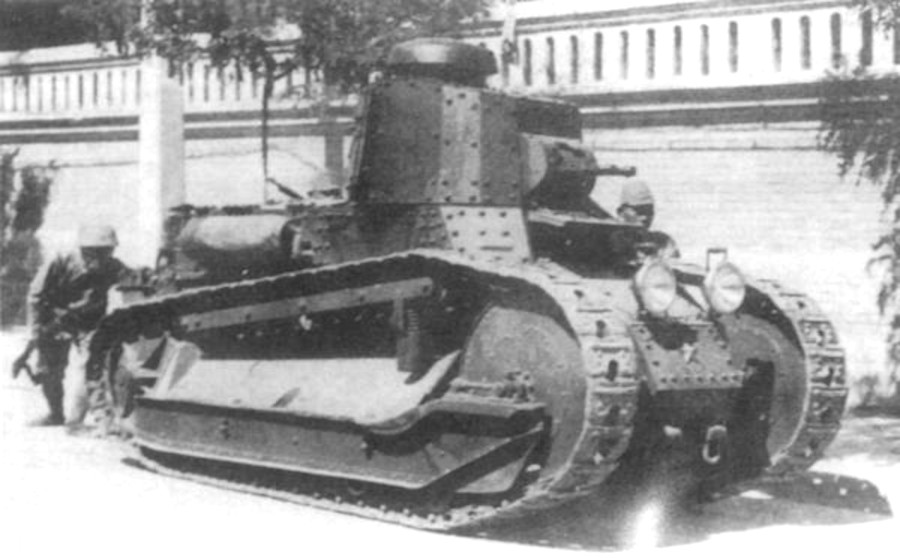
FIAT 3000 export for Japan

=== Operators ===
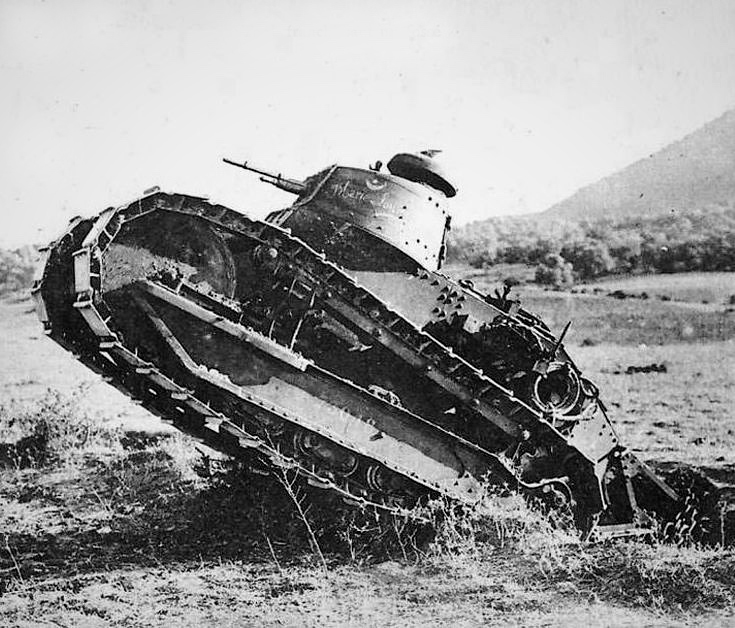
Spanish FT tank in Morocco, 1922

Chinese FT tanks

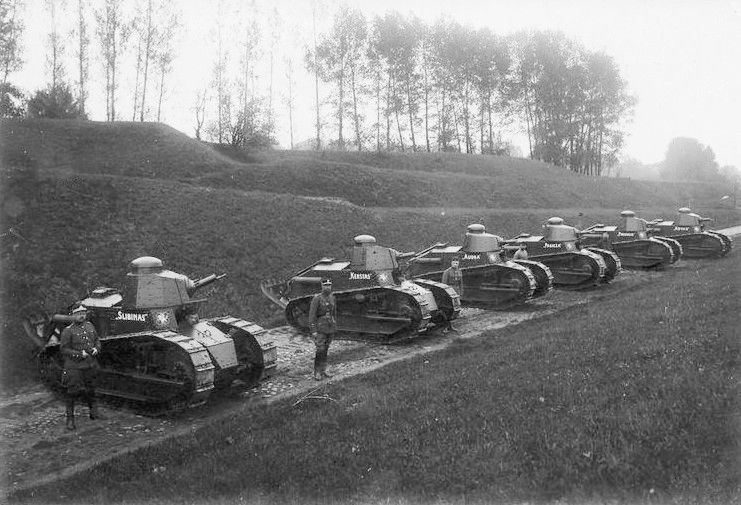
Lithuanian FT tanks in 1925

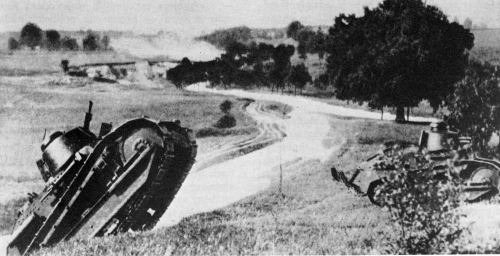
Czechoslovak FT tank in 1928

- Kingdom of Afghanistan (some tanks, four discovered by US forces in 2003)
- Belgium (54 tanks bought in 1919, used until 1934 in a tank regiment and then used by the Gendarmerie before being scrapped in 1938)
- Brazil (12 Carros de assalto, six with 37mm gun, five with 7mm Hotchkiss MGs and one TSF, bought in 1921, later joined by approximatively 28 others, in active service until 1938 and in training service until 1942)
- Republic of China (~20 FTs, used by the Fengtian clique and then by the Northeastern Army)
- Independent State of Croatia (12 former Yugoslav tanks used by the Ustaše Militia and 12 others by the Army against the partisans)
- Czechoslovakia (seven tanks, bought in 1921–1923 and used until 1933)
- Estonia (four FTs with gun and eight FT with machine guns, bought in 1924 and used until 1940)
- Finland (34 tanks, used 1919–1942)
- France
- Vichy France Captured tanks given by Nazi Germany.
- German Empire (captured)
- Nazi Germany (captured)
- Iran (some tanks received from France in 1924, actual delivery disputed)
- Japan (13 tanks, some used alongside Renault NCs in Manchuria in 1932)
- Italy (seven FTs in 1919 and many more Fiat 3000s)
- Lithuania (12 FTs with Maxim machine guns, bought in 1923)
- Manchukuo (ex-Chinese tanks from 1931, with some Japanese or French tanks later supplied)
- Netherlands (one FT with Schwarzlose machine gun, used for trials)
- Commonwealth of the Philippines (one ex-American tank, used 1936–1940)
- Poland
- Kingdom of Romania (74–76 Renault FTs, including 40 tanks with 37mm guns, bought in 1919, used by the Regiment 1 Care de Lupta and during WW2 by an internal security battalion)
- (Russia) Russian White movement
- Soviet Union
- Spain (18 FTs delivered from France between 1919 and 1925 and 48 others delivered from France and Poland to the Spanish Republic)
- Sweden (one tank bought for trials in 1923)
- Switzerland (two tanks bought in 1921 and three others in 1939 for training the infantry to the tanks)
- Turkey (one company of Renault FT, received from France in 1921 or 1928)
- United Kingdom (24 on loan in 1918, for command and reconnaissance. Returned after War.)
- United States
- Kingdom of Yugoslavia

== Variants ==
- Char canon: an FT with a 37 mm Puteaux SA 18 short-barreled gun: about 3/5 of tanks ordered, about 1/3 of tanks actually produced
- Char mitrailleuse: an FT with an 8 mm Hotchkiss M1914 machine gun: about 2/5 of tanks ordered, about 3/5 of tanks produced
- FT 75 BS: a self propelled gun with a short barreled Blockhaus Schneider 75mm gun: 40 were produced.
- Char signal or TSF: a command tank with a radio. "TSF" stands for télégraphie sans fil ("wireless"). No armament, three-men crew, 300 ordered, 100 produced.
- FT modifié 31: upgraded tanks with 7.5 mm Reibel machine gun. After trials from 1929 to 1931, this modification was made in 1933–1934 on 1000 chars mitrailleurs still in French stocks. This version was sometimes referred to as the "FT 31", though this was not the official name.
- FT désarmé : French char canon whose 37mm gun has been removed in the 1930s to arm modern tanks, and used for various purposes:
  - Pont Bourguignon sur char FT: FT without turret carrying a light bridge, from an idea of General Louis Ferdinand Bourguignon.
  - some were rearmed with an FM 24/29 light machine gun
- FT-Ko: Thirteen modified units imported by the Imperial Japanese Army in 1919, armed with either the 37mm SA 18 cannon or machine guns; used in combat in the Manchurian Incident and subsequently for training
- M1917: US-built copy. 950 built, 374 of which were gun tanks and fifty of which were radio tanks. During World War II the Canadian Army purchased 236 redundant M1917s for training purposes.
- Russkiy Reno: the "Russian Renault", the first Soviet tank, produced at Krasnoye Sormovo. A close copy. 17 units were produced. Also known as "Tank M" or "KS tank".
- Renault FT CWS: the Renault FT CWS or Zelazny ("iron") tanks were built in Poland for use as training vehicles only (Polish combat tanks were French manufactured). These tanks used spare French engines and components. The hulls and turrets were manufactured to French specifications in all other respects. Around 27 CWS FT tanks were built. CWS is the abbreviation for Centralne Warsztaty Samochodowe (translated as "Central Workshops for Motor vehicles" or "Central Truck Workshop"), a plant in Warsaw which performed maintenance and depot level repair.
- Renault FT Kégresse: FT modernized with different suspension and Kégresse rubber tracks; used by France, Yugoslavia, and Poland in limited numbers
- FIAT 3000: an Italian derivation.
- T-18: A Soviet derivation with sprung suspension and Fiat engines.
- Polish gas tank: A Polish modification built in the Wojskowy Instytut Gazowy ("Military Gas Institute") and tested on the Rembertów proving ground on 5 July 1926. Instead of a turret, the tank had twin gas cylinders. It was designed to create smoke screens, but could also be used for chemical attacks. Only one was produced.
- Renault FT AC: A December 1939 plan to convert France's obsolete FTs into tank destroyers. The tank never left the drawing board. It was designed to have a 47mm APX anti-tank gun instead of the turret.
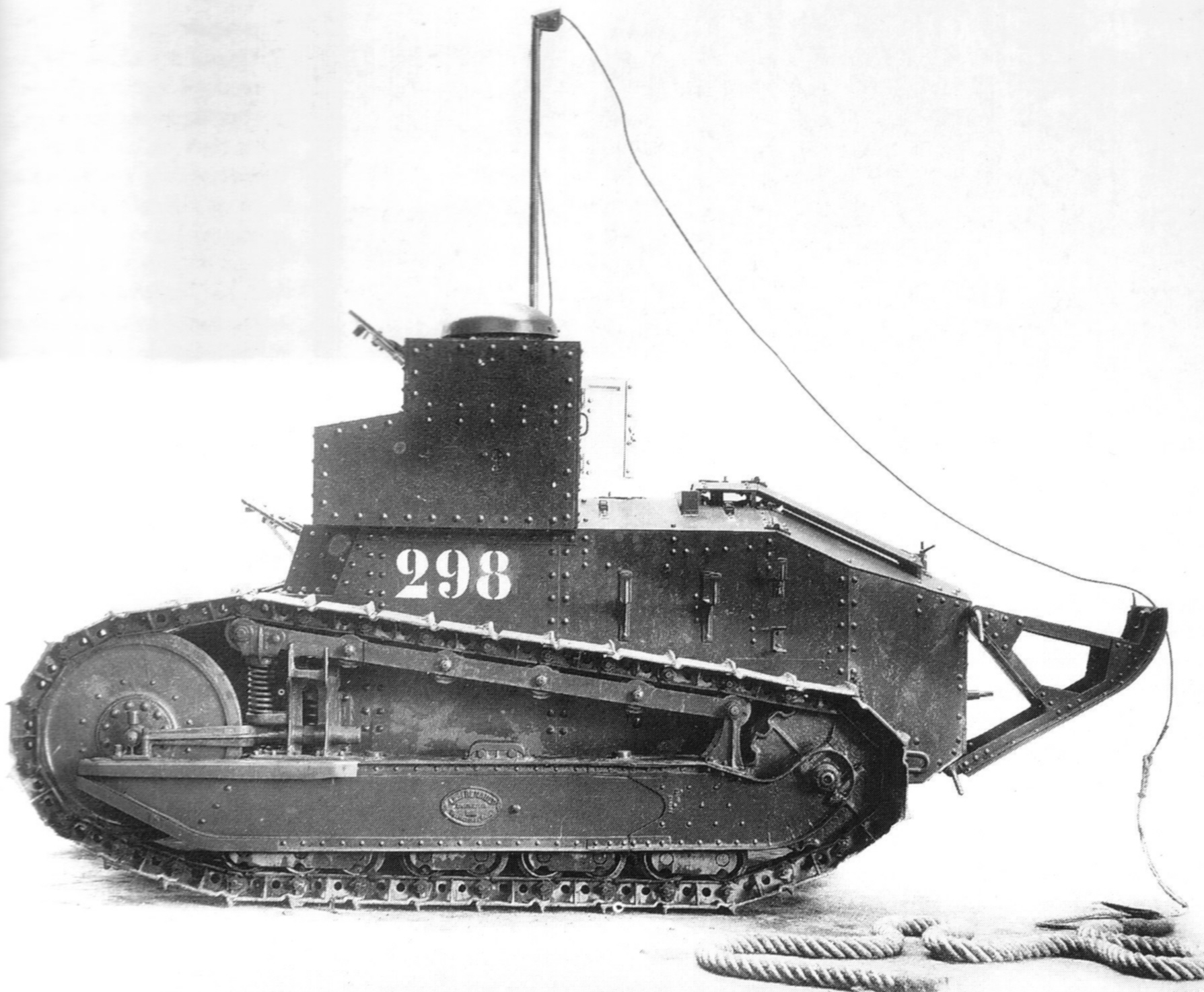
Renault FT TSF

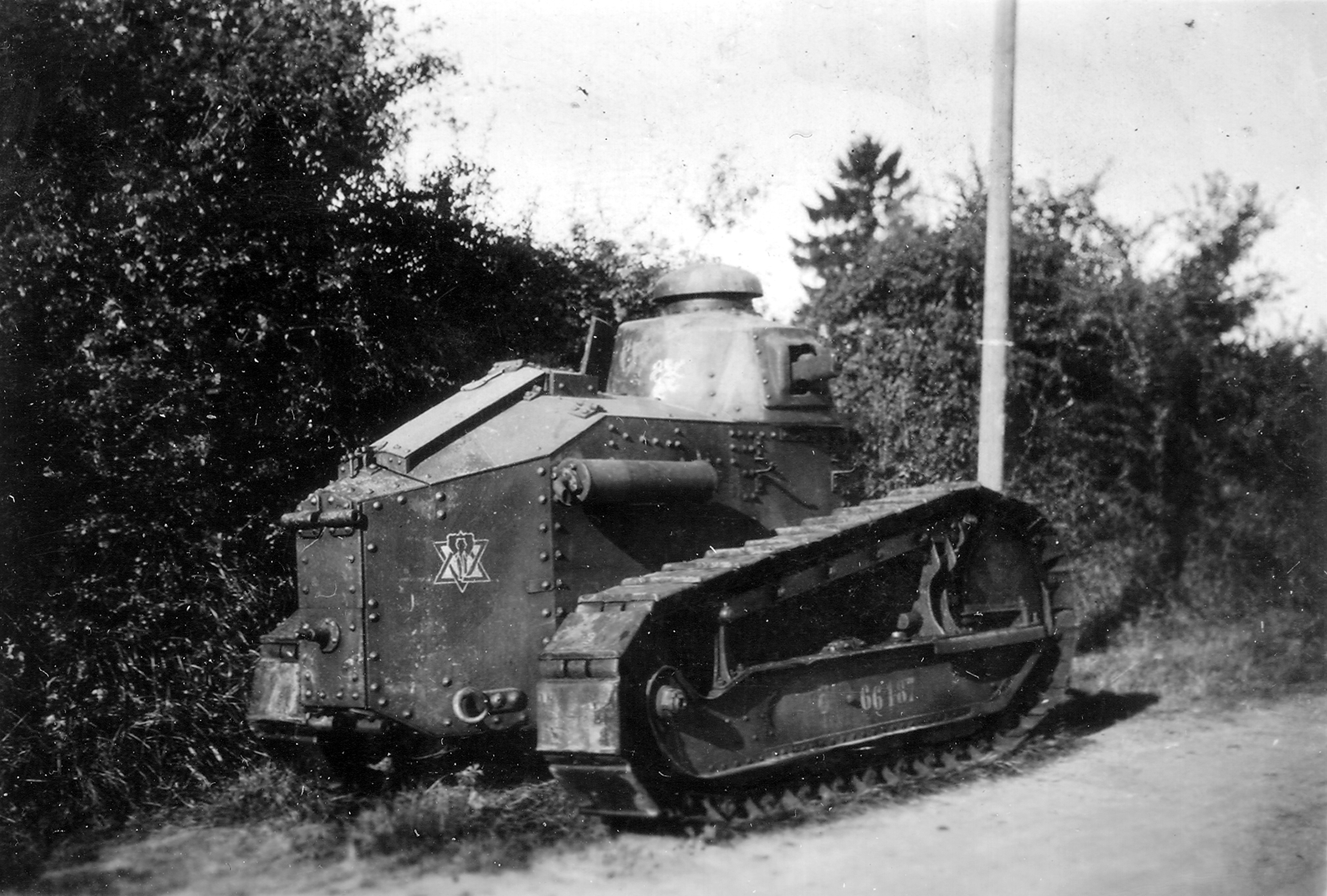
FT modifié 31 destroyed near Lisieux (Normandy) in June 1940

French FT Kégresse in Morocco 1926

French FT Kégresse with rollers

== Surviving vehicles ==
Approximately 41 FTs, two Russkiy Renos, and three FT TSF survive in various museums around the world. Twenty M1917s also survive.

Europe:

- Musée des Blindés, Saumur, France. The museum owns three FTs, with two in running order. The inoperable one came from Afghanistan, and is in a static display. Two other tanks from Afghanistan were given to the Patton Museum of Cavalry & Armor at Fort Knox, Kentucky. Another one was given to Poland, where it has been renovated and is in running order. The Musée des Blindés also owns an FT TSF.
- Musée de la Grande Guerre, Meaux, Seine-et-Marne, France. One FT canon.
- Musee de l'Armee, Paris, France. One FT
- Glade of the Armistice, near Compiègne, France. One FT
- Bovington Tank Museum, United Kingdom. One FT, an unarmoured training model prototype built in 1917.
- The Weald Foundation, United Kingdom, has an FT and a TSF.
- Royal Military Museum, Belgium. One FT is on permanent display.
- National Military Museum, Bucharest, Romania. An FT is on permanent outdoor display.
- Military Museum (Belgrade), Belgrade, Serbia. An FT is on permanent outdoor display.
- Parola Tank Museum, Parola, Finland. An FT is on display in the tank hall.
- Musée de l'armée Suisse, Burgdorf, Switzerland. An FT is displayed as the first tank of the Swiss Army, adopted in 1922.
- Museo de Medios Acorazados, El Goloso (Spain). An FT model 1917 under repair.
- Rogaland Krigshistoriske Museum, Stavanger, Norway
- Polish Army Museum, Warsaw, Poland. Acquired from Afghanistan in 2012, renovated to running order.
- Overloon War Museum, Overloon, Netherlands has a Renault FT bearing German markings. This vehicle was captured in France and subsequently used by the German army to patrol and guard the Volkel airbase during World War II.
- Two full-scale, working replicas of Renault FTs were built from scratch by an enthusiast, the late Robert Tirczakowski for Jerzy Hoffman's 2011 film Battle of Warsaw 1920.
- Tellevik Coastal Fort, Norway. One FT.
- Wehrtechnische Studiensammlung Koblenz, Germany. One FT.
- Fort De Seclin, Near Lille, France. One FT.
- Ministère Des Armées, Paris, France. One FT.
- MM Park, La Wantzenau, France. Two FT restoration projects.
- Fondation Automobile Marius Berliet, Le Montellier, France. One FT.
- General Military Academy, Zaragoza, Spain. One FT.
- Infantry Academy, Toledo, Spain. One FT.
- Ouvrage Hackenberg Maginot Line Fortress, Veckring, France. One FT TSF.
- Fort Du Zeiterholz, Entrange, France. One FT TSF.
- Patriot Park, Kubinka, Russia. One FT and one Russkiy Reno.

Asia:

North America:

- U.S. Army Armor and Cavalry Collection, Fort Benning, Georgia in the United States. In 2003, two FT tanks, one would have mounted a 37mm cannon and the other an 8mm mg, were discovered in Kabul by Major Robert Redding. With permission from the Afghan government, the two tanks were transferred to the United States, where one of them, a machine gun tank, was restored and originally put on display in the Patton Museum of Cavalry & Armor, until the Armor Branch collection was transferred to Fort Benning. This FT is currently on display in the Armor Gallery of the NIM. The Armor Collection currently is restoring the other FT, 37mm gun tank. A previous FT at Fort Knox was transferred to US Army Heritage & Education Center at Carlisle Barracks, Pennsylvania.
- Louisiana State Military Museum at Jackson Barracks in New Orleans, Louisiana. An FT was inundated by floodwaters of Hurricane Katrina in 2005. It was restored by the Museum of the American G.I. and has been returned to display.
- National World War I Museum, located at Liberty Memorial, Kansas City, Missouri. An FT, damaged by German artillery.
- An FT is on static display at the US Army Heritage and Education Center at Carlisle Barracks, Pennsylvania.
- The Museum of the American G.I. in College Station, Texas has a completely original, fully functional, fully operational FT with functional 37mm main gun. The tank saw service during the war and exhibits minor battle damage on some track segments.
- National Museum of the United States Army, Virginia, USA. One FT-17 nicknamed "The Five of Hearts."
- Fort Gregg-Adams, Virginia, USA. One FT with 6-Ton M1917 turret.

South America:

- Museu Militar Conde de Linhares in Rio de Janeiro, Brazil. One FT.
- Museu Eduardo André Matarazzo, Bebedouro, Brazil. One FT is on permanent display
- 1st Region Regional Maintenance Military Park, Rio de Janeiro, Brazil. One FT.
- Museu Histórico Do Exército E Forte De Copacabana, Rio de Janeiro, Brazil. One FT.
- Centro De Instrução De Blindados, Santa Maria, Brazil. One FT.
- Academia Militar Das Agulhas Negras, Resende, Brazil. One FT.
- 2nd Regiment Guard Cavalry, Pirassununga, Brazil. One FT.
- Museum Eduardo André Matarazzo, Bebedouro, Brazil. One FT.

Australia:

- Australian War Memorial, Canberra. One FT at the Treloar storage and conservation annexe in Mitchell, Australian Capital Territory
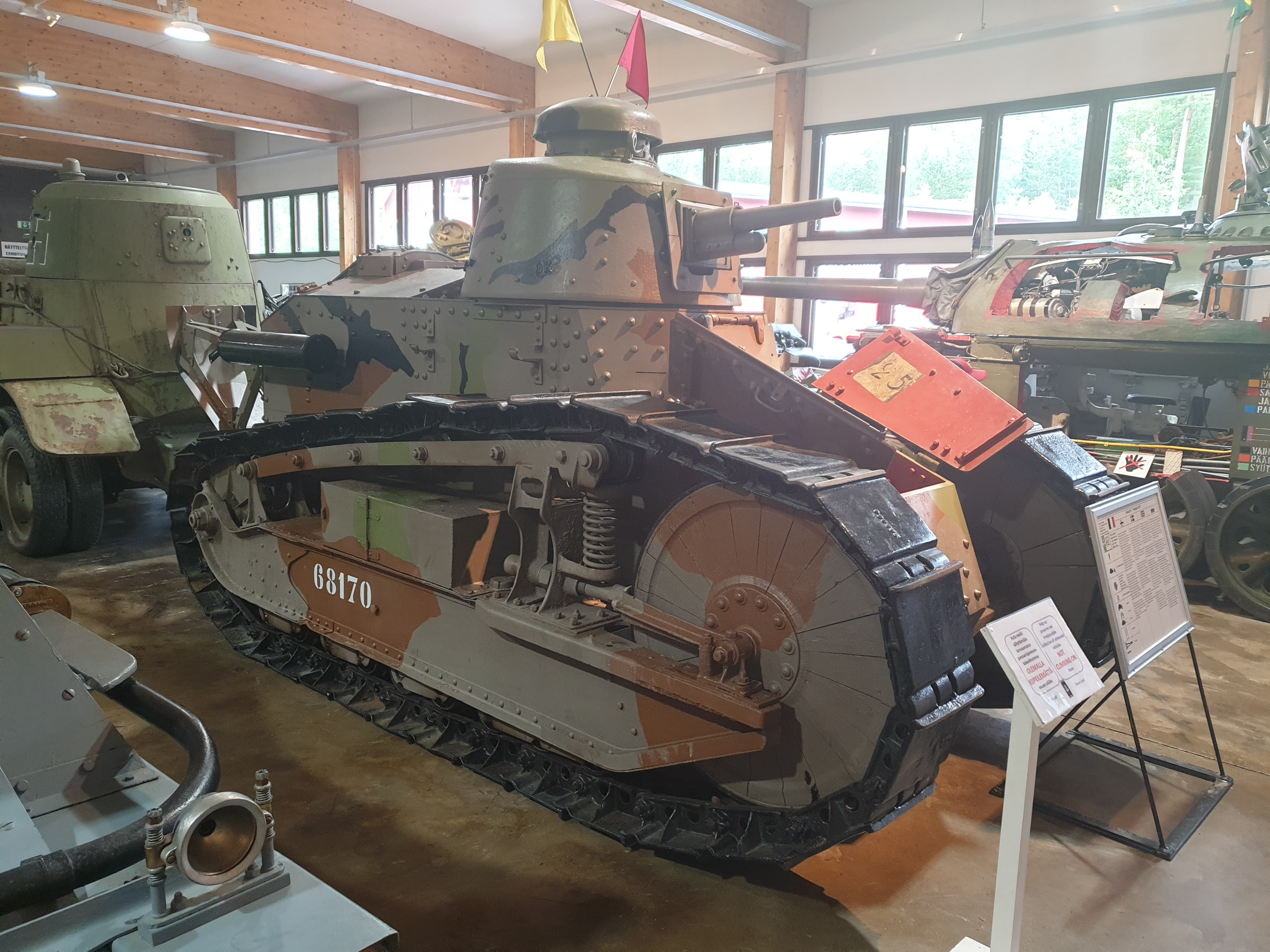
Renault FT in Parola Tank Museum procured by Finland in 1919. In service until 1942.

Renault FT running at the Musée des Blindés

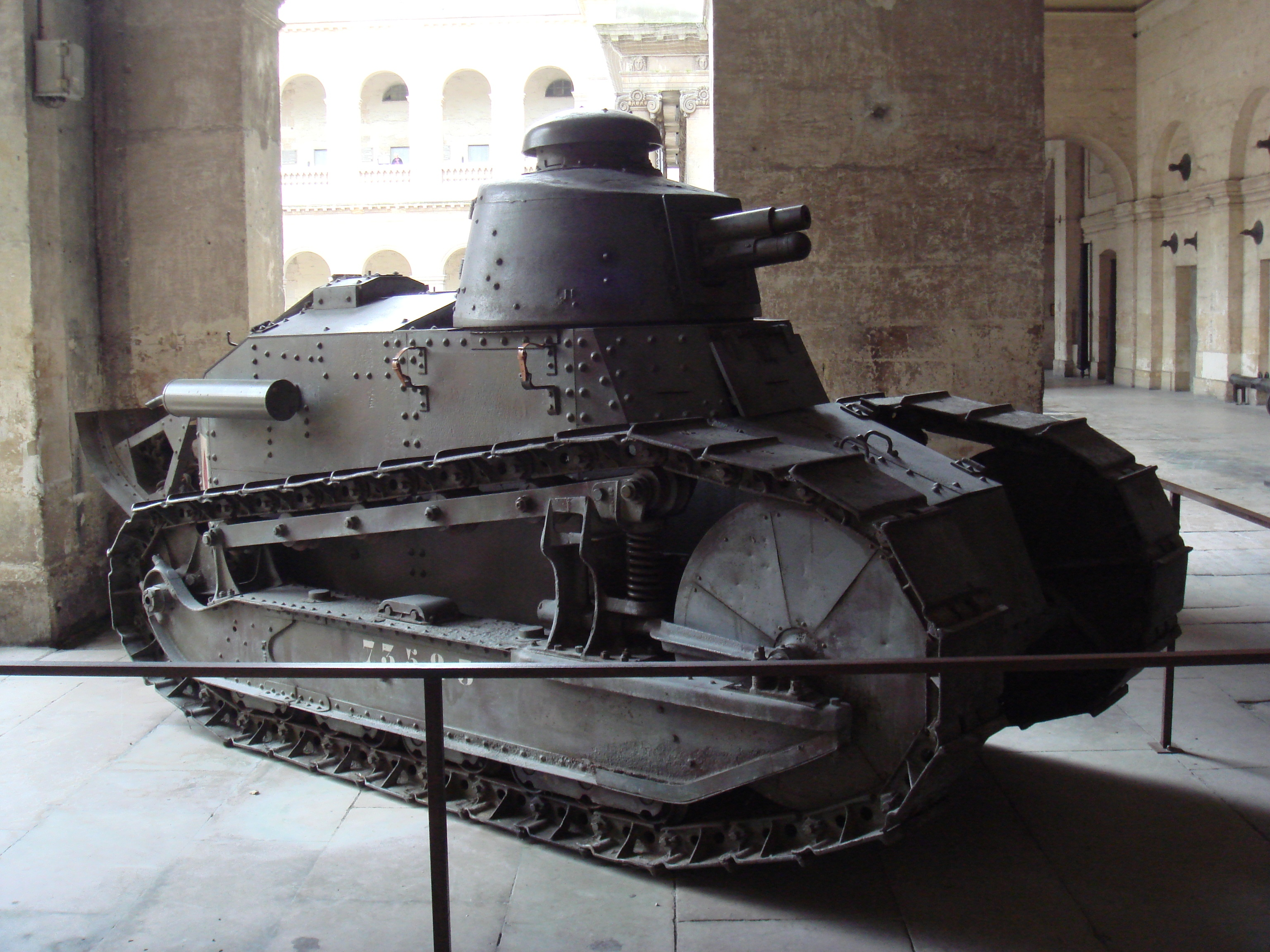
Char Renault FT at the Musée de l'Armée

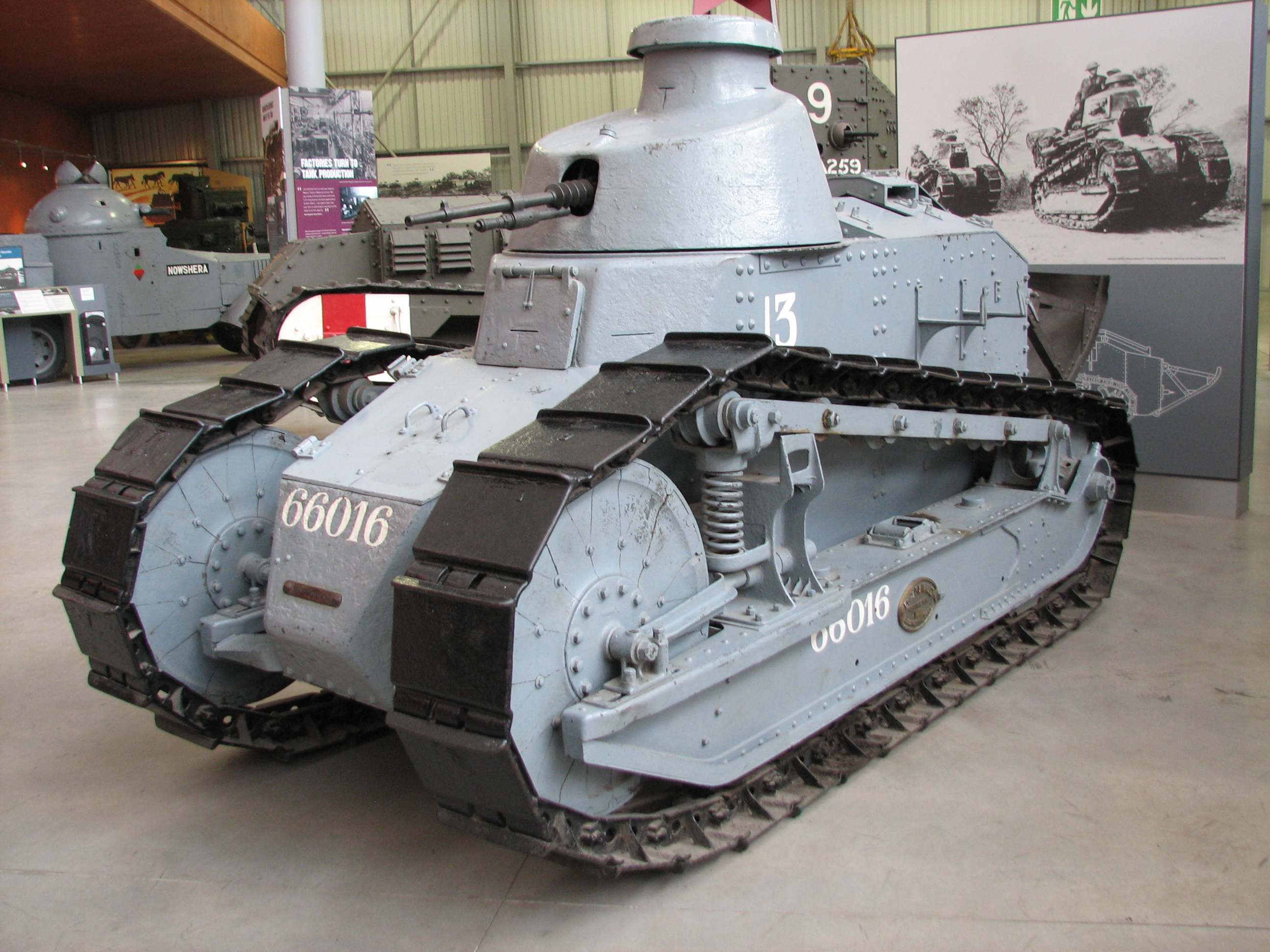
FT at Bovington Tank Museum

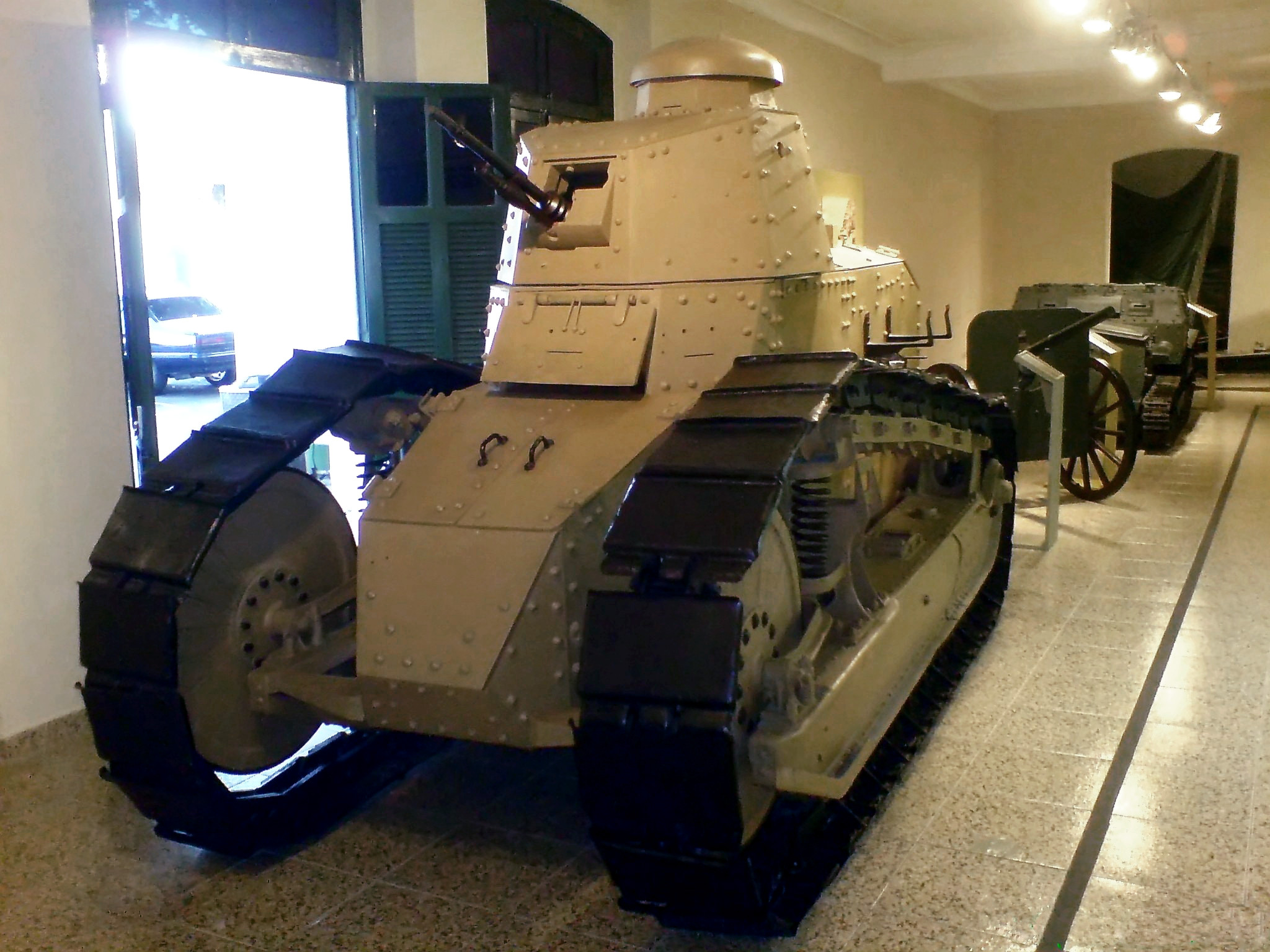
A Brazilian army FT received in 1921

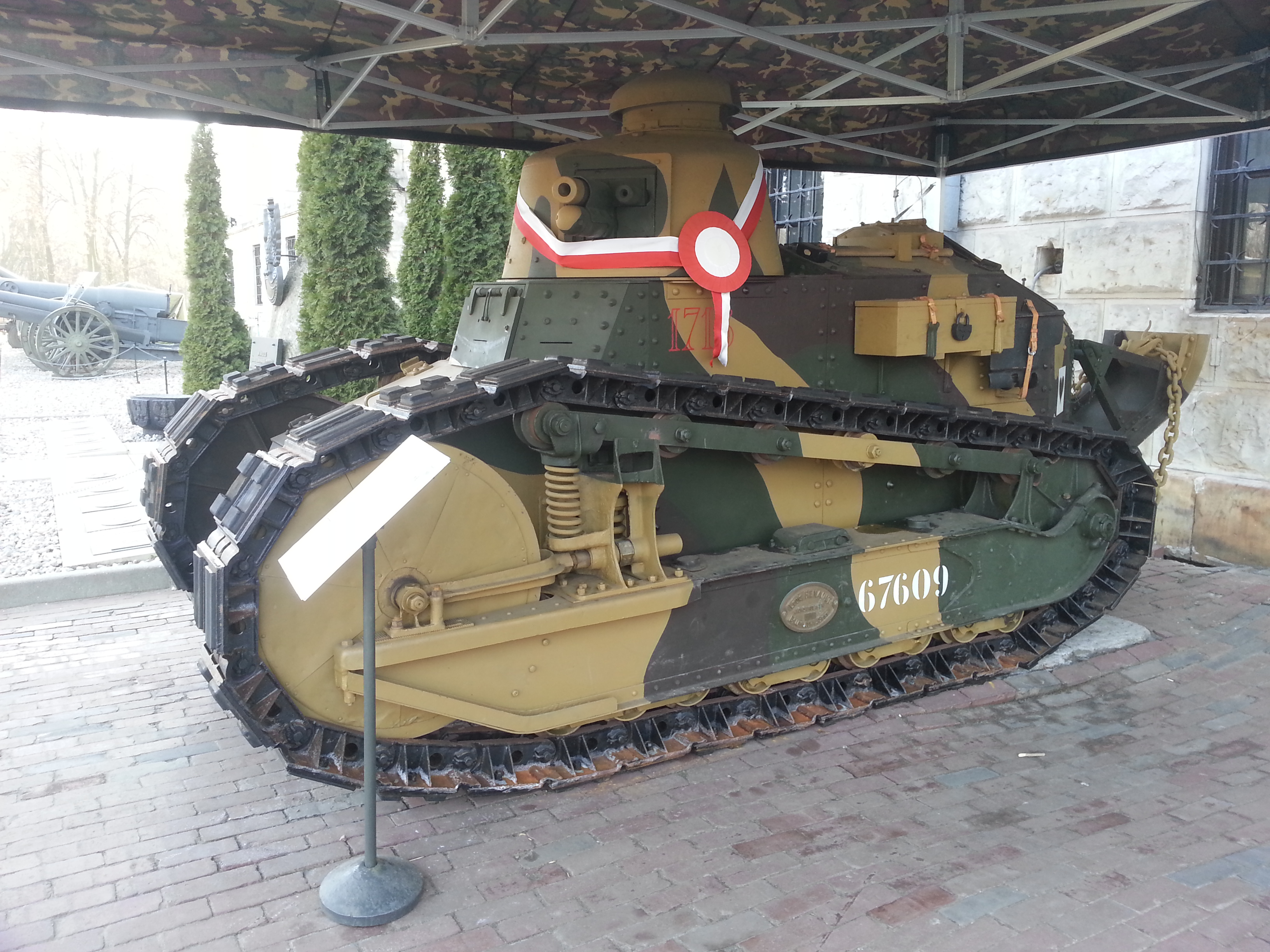
Renault FT in Polish Army Museum

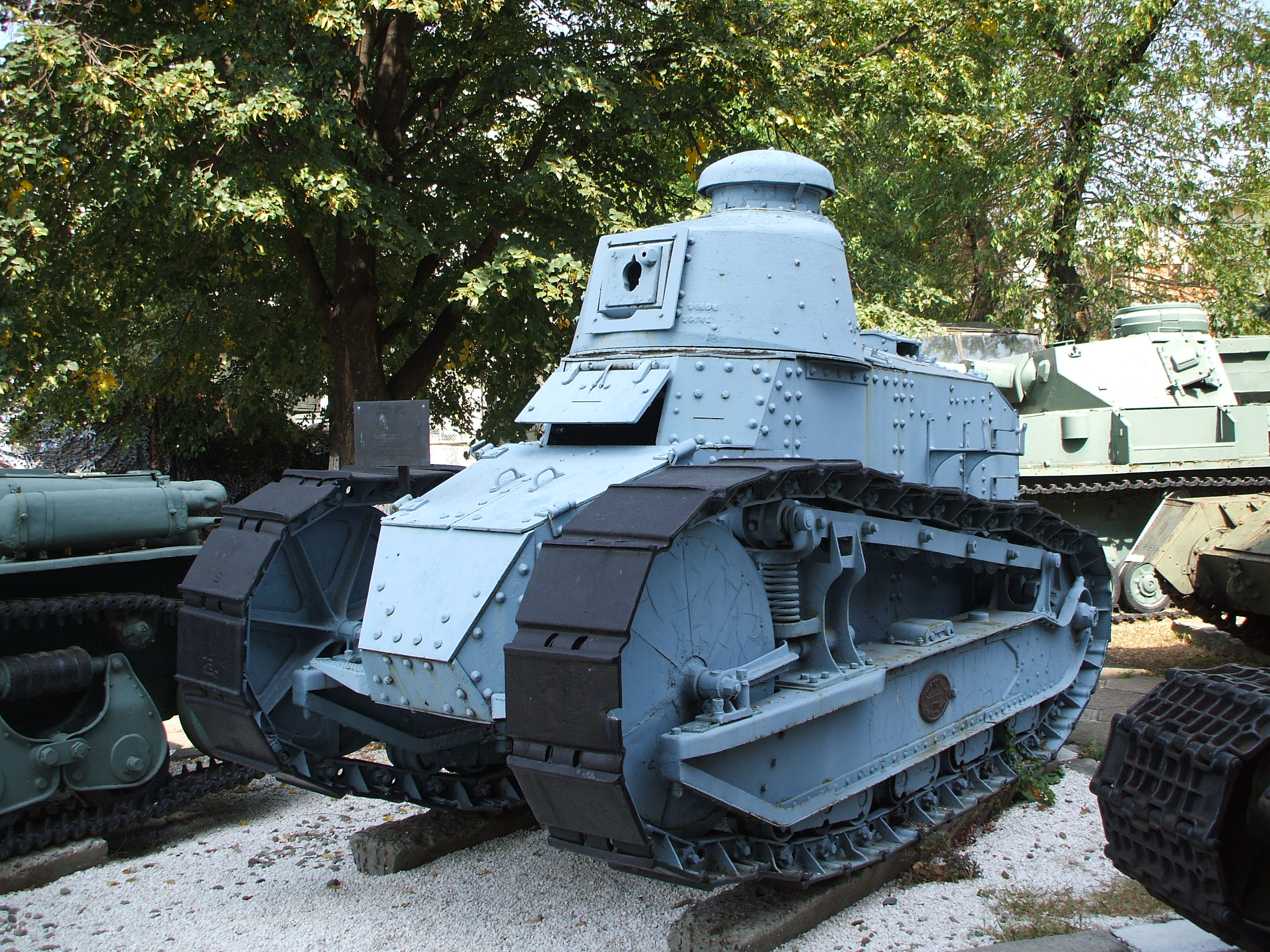
Romanian-used FT at the National Military Museum, Bucharest

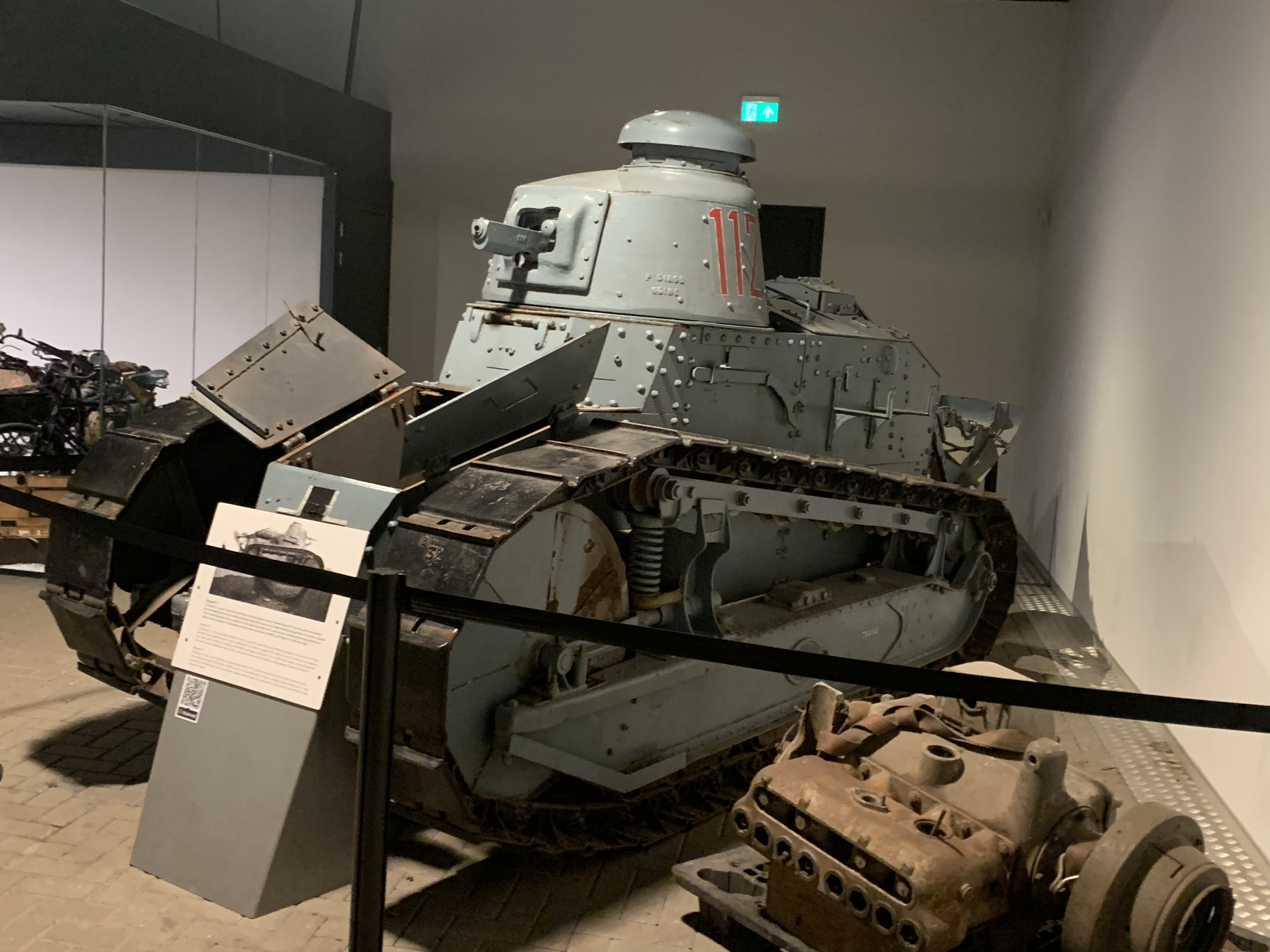
German-captured FT at the Overloon War Museum, Overloon

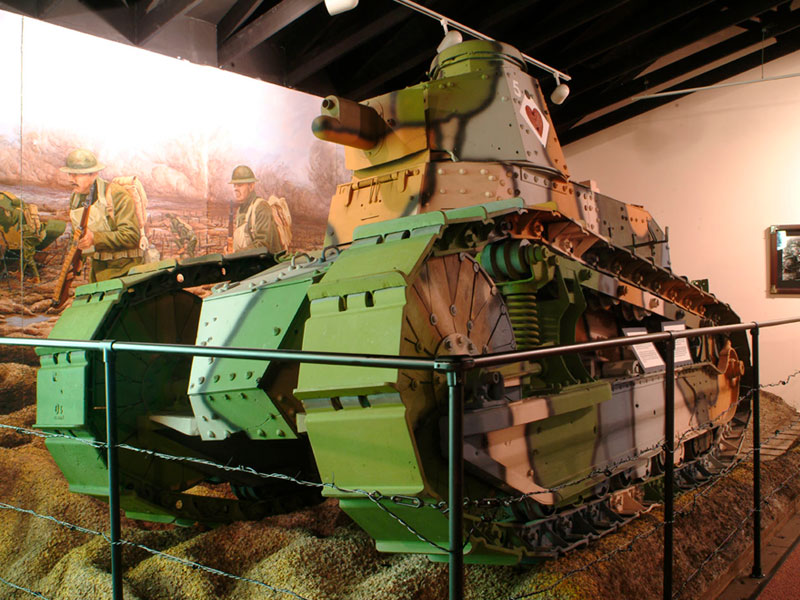
Renault FT-17, nicknamed "The Five of Hearts," at the National Museum of the United States Army

== See also ==
- G-numbers, part of former US cataloging system for military vehicles
- Tanks of France

== Sources ==
- Cappellano, Filippo; Battistelli, Pier Paolo (2012). Italian Light Tanks 1919–45. New Vanguard 191. London: Osprey Publishing Ltd. ISBN 9781849087773.
- Danjou, Pascal (2009). Renault FT. Trackstory 10 (in French). Editions du Barbotin. ISBN 978-2952098878.
- Forty, George; Livesey, Jack (2006). The World Encyclopedia of Tanks and Armoured Fighting Vehicles. London: Anness Publishing Ltd. ISBN 978-0754833512.
- Gale, Tim (2013). The French Army's Tank Force and Armoured Warfare in the Great War: the Artillerie Spéciale. Routledge Studies in First World War History. Routledge. ISBN 9781138247208.
- Jeudy, Jean-Gabriel (1997). Chars de France (in French). ETAI. ISBN 9782726883693.
- Zaloga, Steven J. (1988). The Renault FT Light Tank. Vanguard 46. London: Osprey Publishing Ltd. ISBN 9780850458527.
- Zaloga, Steven J. (2010). French Tanks of World War 1. New Vanguard 173. London: Osprey Publishing Ltd. ISBN 978-1-84603-513-5.
- Zaloga, Steven J. (2014). French Tanks of World War II (1): Infantry and Battle Tanks. New Vanguard 209. London: Osprey Publishing Ltd. ISBN 9781782003892.
