= N-curve =

In the functional theoretic algebra C[0, 1] of continuous curves on the unit interval, an n-curve is a specific transformation of a given base curve. For a loop γ: [0, 1] → $\mathbb{C}$ (or another suitable space) such that γ(0) = γ(1) = 1 (the base point), and for any positive integer n, the associated n-curve, denoted γ n, is defined by the pointwise functional power.

We take the functional theoretic algebra C[0, 1] of curves. For each loop γ at 1, and each positive integer n, we define a curve $\gamma_n$ called n-curve. The n-curves are interesting in two ways.

1. Their f-products, sums and differences give rise to many beautiful curves.
2. Using the n-curves, we can define a transformation of curves, called n-curving.

== Multiplicative inverse of a curve ==
A curve γ in the functional theoretic algebra C[0, 1], is invertible, i.e.

$$\gamma^{-1} \,$$

exists if

$$\gamma(0)\gamma(1) \neq 0. \,$$

If $\gamma^{*}=(\gamma(0)+\gamma(1))e - \gamma$, where $e(t)=1, \forall t \in [0, 1]$, then

$$\gamma^{-1}= \frac{\gamma^{*}}{\gamma(0)\gamma(1)}.$$

The set G of invertible curves is a non-commutative group under multiplication. Also the set H of loops at 1 is an Abelian subgroup of G. If $\gamma \in H$, then the mapping $\alpha \to \gamma^{-1}\cdot \alpha\cdot\gamma$ is an inner automorphism of the group G.

We use these concepts to define n-curves and n-curving.

== n-curves and their products ==
If x is a real number and [x] denotes the greatest integer not greater than x, then $x-[x] \in [0, 1].$

If $\gamma \in H$ and n is a positive integer, then define a curve $\gamma_{n}$ by

$$\gamma_n (t)=\gamma(nt - [nt]). \,$$

$\gamma_{n}$ is also a loop at 1 and we call it an n-curve. Note that every curve in H is a 1-curve.

Suppose $\alpha, \beta \in H.$ Then, since $\alpha(0)=\beta(1)=1, \mbox{ the f-product } \alpha \cdot \beta = \beta + \alpha -e$.

=== Example 1: Product of the astroid with the n-curve of the unit circle ===
Let us take u, the unit circle centered at the origin and α, the astroid. The n-curve of u is given by,

$$u_n(t) = \cos(2\pi nt)+ i \sin(2\pi nt) \,$$

and the astroid is

$$\alpha(t)=\cos^{3}(2\pi t)+ i \sin^{3}(2\pi t), 0\leq t \leq 1$$

The parametric equations of their product $\alpha \cdot u_{n}$ are

$$x=\cos^3 (2\pi t)+ \cos(2\pi nt)-1,$$
$$y=\sin^{3}(2\pi t)+ \sin(2\pi nt)$$

See the figure.

Since both $\alpha \mbox{ and } u_{n}$ are loops at 1, so is the product.

n-curve with $N=53$

Animation of n-curve for n values from 0 to 50

=== Example 2: Product of the unit circle and its n-curve ===
The unit circle is

$$u(t) = \cos(2\pi t)+ i \sin(2\pi t) \,$$

and its n-curve is

$$u_n(t) = \cos(2\pi nt)+ i \sin(2\pi nt) \,$$

The parametric equations of their product

$$u \cdot u_{n}$$

are

$$x= \cos(2\pi nt)+ \cos(2\pi t)-1,$$
$$y =\sin(2\pi nt)+ \sin(2\pi t)$$

See the figure.

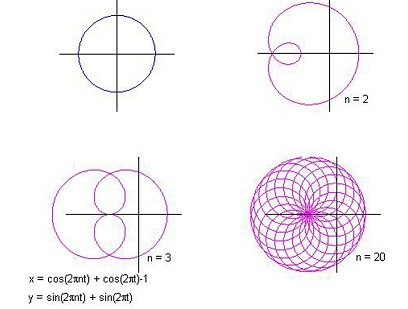

=== Example 3: n-Curve of the Rhodonea minus the Rhodonea curve ===
Let us take the Rhodonea Curve

$$r = \cos(3\theta)$$

If $\rho$ denotes the curve,

$$\rho(t) = \cos(6\pi t)[\cos(2\pi t) + i\sin(2\pi t)], 0 \leq t \leq 1$$

The parametric equations of $\rho_{n}- \rho$ are

$$x = \cos(6\pi nt)\cos(2\pi nt) - \cos(6\pi t)\cos(2\pi t),$$
$$y =  \cos(6\pi nt)\sin(2\pi nt)-\cos(6\pi t)\sin(2\pi t), 0 \leq t \leq 1$$

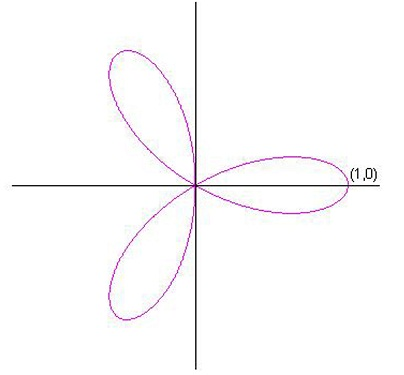
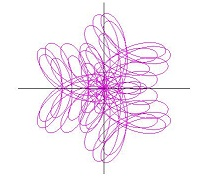

=== n-Curving ===
If $\gamma \in H$, then, as mentioned above, the n-curve $\gamma_{n} \mbox{ also } \in H$. Therefore, the mapping $\alpha \to \gamma_n^{-1}\cdot \alpha\cdot\gamma_n$ is an inner automorphism of the group G. We extend this map to the whole of C[0, 1], denote it by $\phi_{\gamma_n,e}$ and call it n-curving with γ. It can be verified that

$$\phi_{\gamma_n ,e}(\alpha)=\alpha + [\alpha(1)-\alpha(0)](\gamma_{n}-1)e. \$$

This new curve has the same initial and end points as α.

=== Example 1 of n-curving ===
Let ρ denote the Rhodonea curve $r = \cos(2\theta)$, which is a loop at 1. Its parametric equations are

$$x = \cos(4\pi t)\cos(2\pi t),$$
$$y = \cos(4\pi t)\sin(2\pi t), 0\leq t \leq 1$$

With the loop ρ we shall n-curve the cosine curve

$$c(t)=2\pi t + i \cos(2\pi t),\quad 0 \leq t \leq 1. \,$$

The curve $\phi_{\rho_{n},e}(c)$ has the parametric equations

$$x=2\pi[t-1+\cos(4\pi nt)\cos(2\pi nt)], \quad y=\cos(2\pi t)+ 2\pi \cos(4\pi nt)\sin(2\pi nt)$$

See the figure.

It is a curve that starts at the point (0, 1) and ends at (2π, 1).

Notice how the curve starts with a cosine curve at N=0. Please note that the parametric equation was modified to center the curve at origin.

=== Example 2 of n-curving ===
Let χ denote the Cosine Curve

$$\chi(t) = 2\pi t +i\cos(2\pi t), 0\leq t \leq 1$$

With another Rhodonea Curve

$$\rho = \cos(3 \theta)$$

we shall n-curve the cosine curve.

The rhodonea curve can also be given as

$$\rho(t) = \cos(6\pi t)[\cos (2\pi t)+ i\sin(2\pi t)], 0\leq t \leq 1$$

The curve $\phi_{\rho_{n},e}(\chi)$ has the parametric equations

$$x=2\pi t + 2\pi [\cos( 6\pi nt)\cos(2\pi nt)- 1],$$
$$y=\cos(2\pi t) + 2\pi \cos( 6\pi nt)\sin(2 \pi nt), 0\leq t \leq 1$$

See the figure for $n = 15$.

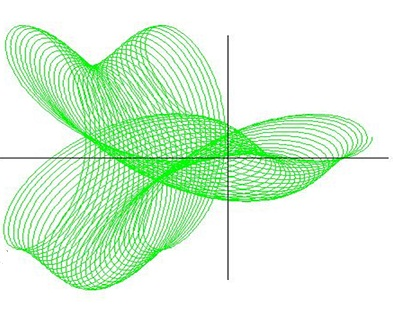

=== Generalized n-curving ===
In the FTA C[0, 1] of curves, instead of e we shall take an arbitrary curve $\beta$, a loop at 1. This is justified since

$$L_1(\beta)=L_2(\beta) = 1$$

Then, for a curve γ in C[0, 1],

$$\gamma^{*}=(\gamma(0)+\gamma(1))\beta - \gamma$$

and

$$\gamma^{-1}= \frac{\gamma^{*}}{\gamma(0)\gamma(1)}.$$

If $\alpha \in H$, the mapping

$$\phi_{\alpha_n,\beta}$$

given by

$$\phi_{\alpha_n,\beta}(\gamma) = \alpha_n^{-1}\cdot \gamma \cdot \alpha_n$$

is the n-curving. We get the formula

$$\phi_{\alpha_n ,\beta}(\gamma)=\gamma + [\gamma(1)-\gamma(0)](\alpha_{n}-\beta).$$

Thus given any two loops $\alpha$ and $\beta$ at 1, we get a transformation of curve

$\gamma$ given by the above formula.

This we shall call generalized n-curving.

=== Example 1 ===
Let us take $\alpha$ and $\beta$ as the unit circle u, and $\gamma$ as the cosine curve

$$\gamma (t) = 4\pi t + i\cos(4\pi t) 0 \leq t \leq 1$$

Note that $\gamma (1) - \gamma (0) = 4\pi$

For the transformed curve for $n = 40$, see the figure.

The transformed curve $\phi_{u_n, u}( \gamma )$ has the parametric equations

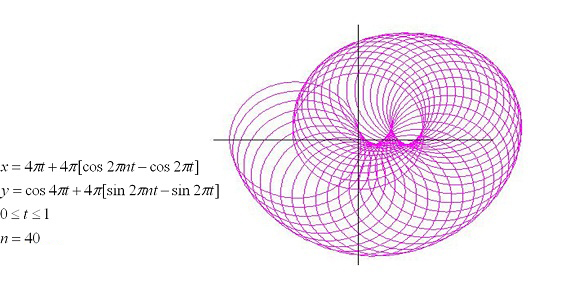

=== Example 2 ===
Denote the curve called Crooked Egg by $\eta$ whose polar equation is

$$r = \cos^3 \theta + \sin^3 \theta$$

Its parametric equations are

$$x = \cos(2\pi t) (\cos^3 2\pi t + \sin^3 2\pi t),$$
$$y = \sin(2\pi t) (\cos^3 2\pi t + \sin^3 2\pi t)$$

Let us take $\alpha = \eta$ and $\beta = u,$

where $u$ is the unit circle.

The n-curved Archimedean spiral has the parametric equations

$$x = 2\pi t \cos(2\pi t)+ 2\pi [(\cos^3 2\pi nt+\sin^3 2\pi nt) \cos(2\pi nt)- \cos(2\pi t)],$$
$$y = 2\pi t \sin(2\pi t)+ 2\pi [(\cos^3 2\pi nt)+\sin^3 2\pi nt)\sin(2\pi nt)- \sin(2\pi t)]$$

See the figures, the Crooked Egg and the transformed Spiral for $n = 20$.

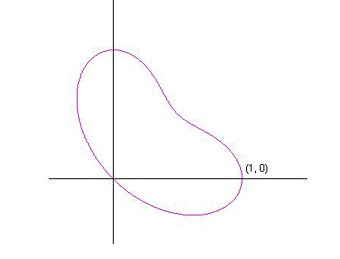
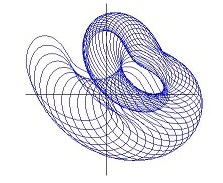
