= FT =

FT or ft may refer to:

== Arts, entertainment, and media ==
- Fairy Tail, a manga and anime
- Featuring (ft.), used when crediting a secondary artist on a musical recording
- Fighting Talk, a British radio show
- Financial Times, a newspaper specialising in UK and international business and financial news
- First Things, a conservative religious journal based in New York
- Fuzzy Tomato, a fictional character in Attack of the Killer Tomatoes: The Animated Series and its sequels

== Businesses and organizations ==
- Faculdade de Tecnologia da Universidade Estadual de Campinas (School of Technology at the State University of Campinas) (Portuguese: Cavalcade de Tecnologia)
- Foundation trusts, semi-autonomous organisational units within the National Health Service in England
- France Télécom, a French telecommunications company, now called Orange
- Føroya Tele, the public telecommunications company in the Faroe Islands.
- FlyEgypt, an Egyptian airline (IATA code FT)

== Science and technology ==
- Foot (unit) (ft.), a unit of distance or length
- Fellow in Thanatology (FT), the scientific study of death awarded by the Association for Death Education and Counseling
- FT gene and protein, involved in flowering in plants

=== Computing ===
- .ft, the filename extension of Lotus Notes full type indexes
- FaceTime, a video chat feature on Apple devices
- Fault Tolerance, the property that enables a system to continue operating properly in the event of the failure of some of its components

=== Vehicles ===
- EMD FT, an American diesel-electric railway locomotive
- Northrop XFT, an American 1930s fighter aircraft
- Renault FT, a tank used in the First World War

=== Other uses in science and technology ===
- Failure tree, in safety engineering and reliability engineering analysis
- Fischer–Tropsch process, chemical reactions that converts carbon monoxide and hydrogen into fuel oil
- Fourier transform, in signal processing, which transforms a function between time and frequency domains
- Fluctuation theorem, in physics relates to the probability distribution of the time-averaged irreversible entropy production
- Franke and Taylor, two digital modes in radio communication: FT8 and is derivative FT4.
- Impulse (physics), the product of force and time (Ft)

== Other uses ==
- Fair trade, a social movement promoting improved trading conditions and sustainability
- FasTrak, abbreviated to FT on the transponder and company logo
- Final Testament, in the Quran
- Fire control technician, a United States Navy occupational rating
- Fischertechnik, a brand of construction toy
- Fort, a fortified place, especially in place names
- Freight ton, in shipping
- Full time, the end of a regulation association football match
- Hungarian forint (Ft), the currency of Hungary
- Nikkormat FT, a Nikon film SLR camera
