= Bouvines =

- Commune
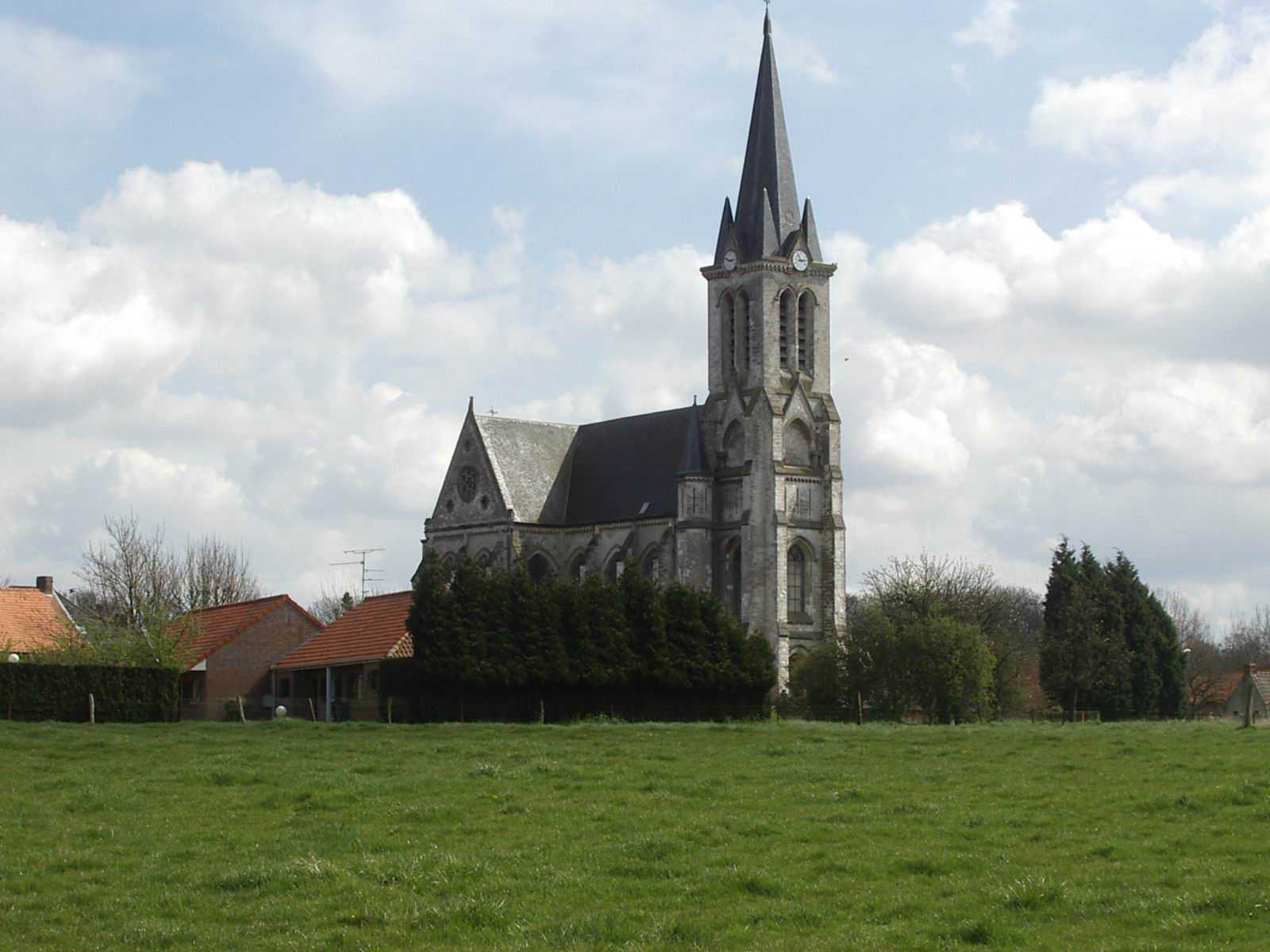
- The church in Bouvines

- Coat of arms
- Location of Bouvines
- Location within France Location within Hauts-de-France
- Coordinates: 50°34′59″N 3°10′59″E
- Country: France
- Region: Hauts-de-France
- Department: Nord
- Arrondissement: Lille
- Canton: Templeuve-en-Pévèle
- Intercommunality: Métropole Européenne de Lille

Government
  - Mayor (2024–2026): Philippe Guillon
- Area^{1}: 2.71 km^{2} (1.05 sq mi)
- Elevation: 31 m (102 ft)
- Population (2023): 766
  - Density: 283/km^{2} (732/sq mi)
- Time zone: UTC+01:00 (CET)
  - Summer (DST): UTC+02:00 (CEST)
- INSEE/Postal code: 59106 /59830
- ^{1} French Land Register data, which excludes lakes, ponds, glaciers > 1 km^{2} (0.386 sq mi or 247 acres) and river estuaries.

Bouvines (French pronunciation: [buvin]; Dutch: Bovingen) is a commune and village in the Nord department in northern France. It is on the French-Belgian border between Lille and Tournai.

== History ==
On 27 July 1214, the Battle of Bouvines was fought here between the forces of the French King Philip Augustus, who was resoundingly victorious, against a coalition, led by Holy Roman Emperor Otto IV and the English King John (who was not present at the battle).

== Population ==
Historical population
Year	Pop.	±% p.a.
1968	560	—
1975	611	+1.25%
1982	577	−0.81%
1990	683	+2.13%
1999	772	+1.37%
2007	722	−0.83%
2012	703	−0.53%
2017	775	+1.97%
2023	766	−0.19%
Source: INSEE

== Heraldry ==
Arms of Bouvines	The arms of Bouvines are blazoned : Bendy Or and azure. (Baisieux, Bouvines and Cysoing use the same arms.)

== Notable residents ==
- General Achille Pierre Deffontaines was born there.

== See also ==
- Communes of the Nord department
