= FTV =

FTV may refer to:

== Television ==
=== Television channels and stations ===
- Fairchild TV, a Canadian Cantonese television network
- FashionTV, a television network
- Federalna televizija, a public service broadcasting organization of the Federation of Bosnia and Herzegovina
- Filipino TV, a Canadian Tagalog language television channel
- Formosa Television, a TV company in Taiwan
- Fantastic Television, a TV company in Hong Kong
- France Télévisions, the French state television network
- Fukushima Television Broadcasting, a television station in Fukushima Prefecture, Japan

=== Other ===
- Free-to-view, a television term for encrypted but non-subscription television services
- Free view point television, a type of 3-D TV that allows the user to change the viewpoint

== Other uses ==
- Fortive, an American industrial technology company which trades on the NYSE as FTV
- An abbreviation for "female transvestite"; a female crossdresser
- flight test vehicle

== See also ==
- FTA (disambiguation)
- F (disambiguation)
