= Functional-theoretic algebra =

Mathematical concept

Any vector space can be made into a unital associative algebra, called functional-theoretic algebra, by defining products in terms of two linear functionals. In general, it is a non-commutative algebra. It becomes commutative when the two functionals are the same.

== Definition ==
Let A_{F} be a vector space over a field F, and let L_{1} and L_{2} be two linear functionals on A_{F} with the property L_{1}(e) = L_{2}(e) = 1_{F} for some e in A_{F}. We define multiplication of two elements x, y in A_{F} by

$$x \cdot y = L_1(x)y + L_2(y)x - L_1(x) L_2(y) e.$$

It can be verified that the above multiplication is associative and that e is the identity of this multiplication.

So, A_{F} forms an associative algebra with unit e and is called a functional theoretic algebra(FTA).

Suppose the two linear functionals L_{1} and L_{2} are the same, say L. Then A_{F} becomes a commutative algebra with multiplication defined by

$$x \cdot y = L(x)y + L(y)x - L(x)L(y)e.$$

== Example ==
X is a nonempty set and F a field. F^{X} is the set of functions from X to F.

If f, g are in F^{X}, x in X and α in F, then define

$$(f+g)(x) = f(x) + g(x)\,$$

and

$$(\alpha f)(x)=\alpha f(x).\,$$

With addition and scalar multiplication defined as this, F^{X} is a vector space over F.

Now, fix two elements a, b in X and define a function e from X to F by e(x) = 1_{F} for all x in X.

Define L_{1} and L_{2} from F^{X} to F by L_{1}(f) = f(a) and L_{2}(f) = f(b).

Then L_{1} and L_{2} are two linear functionals on F^{X} such that L_{1}(e)= L_{2}(e)= 1_{F} For f, g in F^{X} define

$$f \cdot g = L_1(f)g + L_2(g)f - L_1(f) L_2(g) e = f(a)g + g(b)f - f(a)g(b)e.$$

Then F^{X} becomes a non-commutative function algebra with the function e as the identity of multiplication.

Note that

$$(f \cdot g)(a) = f(a)g(a)\mbox{ and }  (f \cdot g)(b) = f(b)g(b).$$

== FTA of Curves in the Complex Plane ==
Let C denote the field of Complex numbers. A continuous function γ from the closed interval [0, 1] of real numbers to the field C is called a curve. The complex numbers γ(0) and γ(1) are, respectively, the initial and terminal points of the curve. If they coincide, the curve is called a loop. The set V[0, 1] of all the curves is a vector space over C.

We can make this vector space of curves into an algebra by defining multiplication as above. Choosing $e(t) = 1, \forall \in [0, 1]$ we have for α,β in C[0, 1],

$${\alpha} \cdot {\beta} = {\alpha}(0){\beta} + {\beta}(1){\alpha} - {\alpha}(0){\beta}(1)e$$

Then, V[0, 1] is a non-commutative algebra with e as the unity.

We illustrate this with an example.

== Example of f-Product of Curves ==
Let us take (1) the line segment joining the points (1, 0) and (0, 1) and (2) the unit circle with center at the origin. As curves in V[0, 1], their equations can be obtained as

$$f(t)=1 - t + it \mbox{ and } g(t)= \cos(2\pi t)+ i\sin(2\pi t)$$

Since $g(0)=g(1)=1$ the circle g is a loop. The line segment f starts from :$f(0)=1$ and ends at $f(1)= i$

Now, we get two f-products $f \cdot g \mbox{ and } g \cdot f$ given by

$$(f\cdot g)(t)=[-t+\cos (2\pi t)]+i[t+\sin(2\pi t)]$$

and

$$(g\cdot f)(t)=[1-t - \sin (2\pi t)] +i[t-1+\cos(2\pi t)]$$

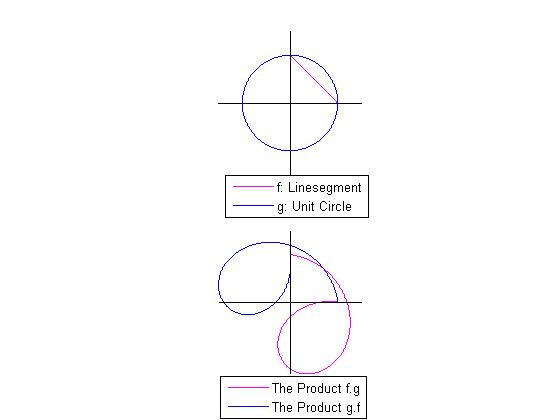
See the Figure.

Observe that $f\cdot g \neq g\cdot f$ showing that multiplication is non-commutative. Also both the products starts from $f(0)g(0)=1 \mbox{ and ends at } f(1)g(1)= i.$

== See also ==
- N-curve
