= Fort de Seclin =

Museum in France

- Part of Fortifications of Lille, Séré de Rivières system
- Seclin, France
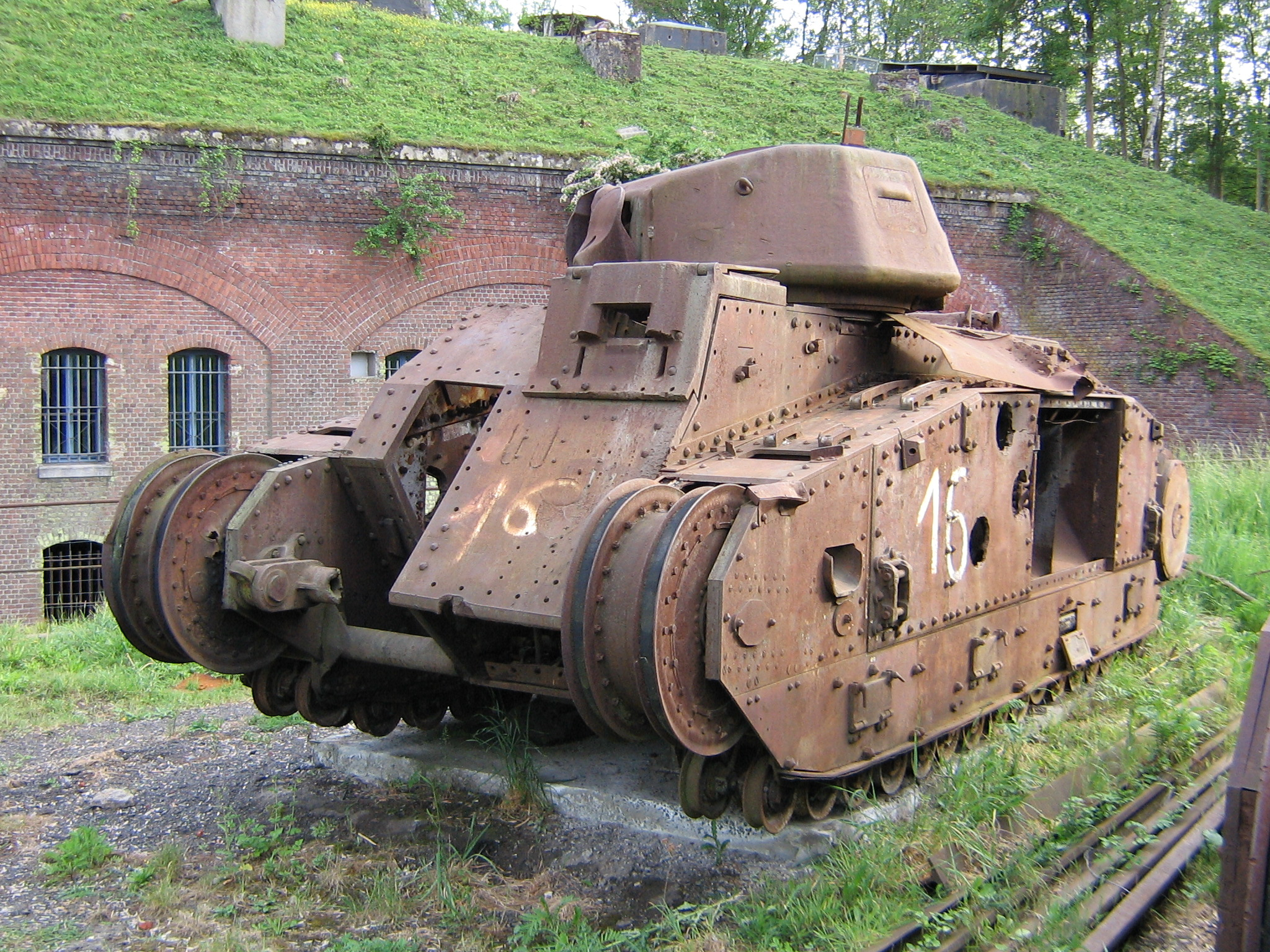
- Char B1 tank at the Fort de Seclin

Site information
- Type: Fort
- Owner: Private
- Controlled by: France
- Open to the public: Yes
- Condition: Museum

Location
- Coordinates: 50.555769°N 3.053076°E

Site history
- Built: 1878
- Materials: Masonry
- Battles/wars: Battle of France

The Fort de Seclin, also known as Fort Duhoux, is located near the commune of Seclin, France, about 9.5 kilometres (5.9 mi) south of Lille. Built from 1873 to 1875, it is part of the Séré de Rivières system of fortifications that France built following the defeat of the Franco-Prussian War. It was never modernized to cope with improvements in artillery technology in the late 19th century. It has been preserved and is interpreted by a local preservation association for the public.

== Description ==
The Fort de Seclin is trapezoidal in shape, with a central artillery position on top of barracks and support facilities, surrounded by a defended ditch and counterscarp. The ditch is covered by a double caponier and an aileron. The main entry has its own ravelin. The two-level barracks are recessed into courtyards and covered with earth and turf. The fort is constructed in brick and stone masonry and was never upgraded with concrete protection.

The fort was initially armed with about forty artillery pieces, served by between 700 and 800 men. It had two satellite batteries.

== History ==
=== World War I ===
The fort did not see significant action during World War I, as it was to the rear of Lille and was among the last positions to be overrun. The Germans took over the fort and used it as a supply depot until 1918, when it was occupied by British forces from the 68th Battalion, King's Liverpool Regiment, as they advanced into Lille.

=== World War II ===
The Fort de Seclin saw no significant action in the Battle of France in 1940. The fort was again occupied by the Germans and used as a prison for French Resistance fighters. A total of 69 people were executed at the fort. In the most notable event, seven employees of the French national railways were arrested and accused of sabotage, spying and armed resistance. The six male prisoners were executed by firing squad at the Fort de Seclin on 7 June 1944. A monument commemorates the dead.

Following the war it continued in use as an ammunition depot until the French Army abandoned it.

== Present ==
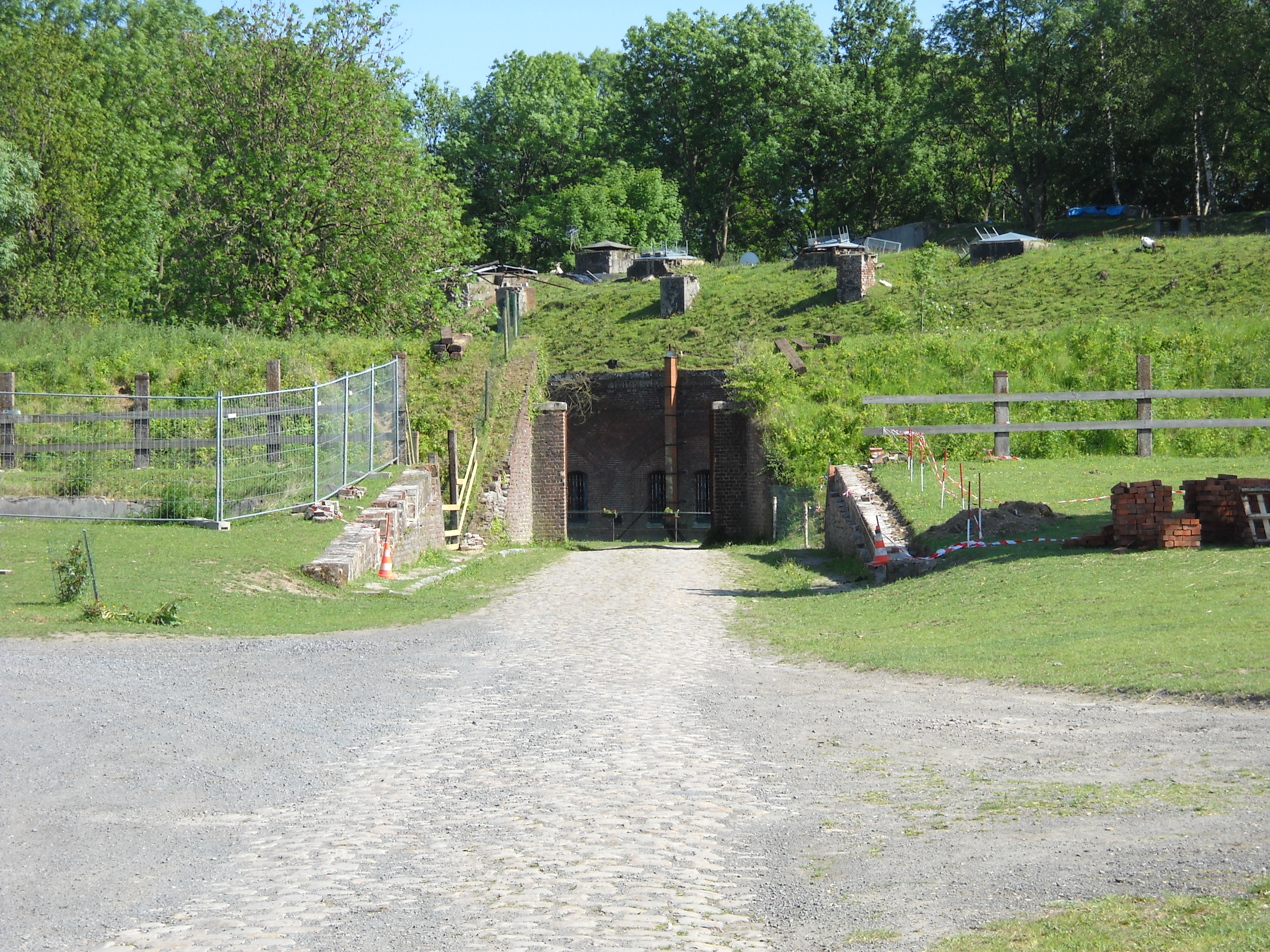
Entrance to the fort

The Fort de Seclin was purchased by private owners in 1996. In 2003 they opened a museum on the site showing military equipment from the era of the Franco-Prussian War up to the First World War, focusing particularly on artillery and horse-drawn carriages.

== See also ==
- Achille Pierre Deffontaines

== Bibliography ==
- Les fusillés du Fort de Seclin, Mémorial at Ascq 1944
