= Renault NC =

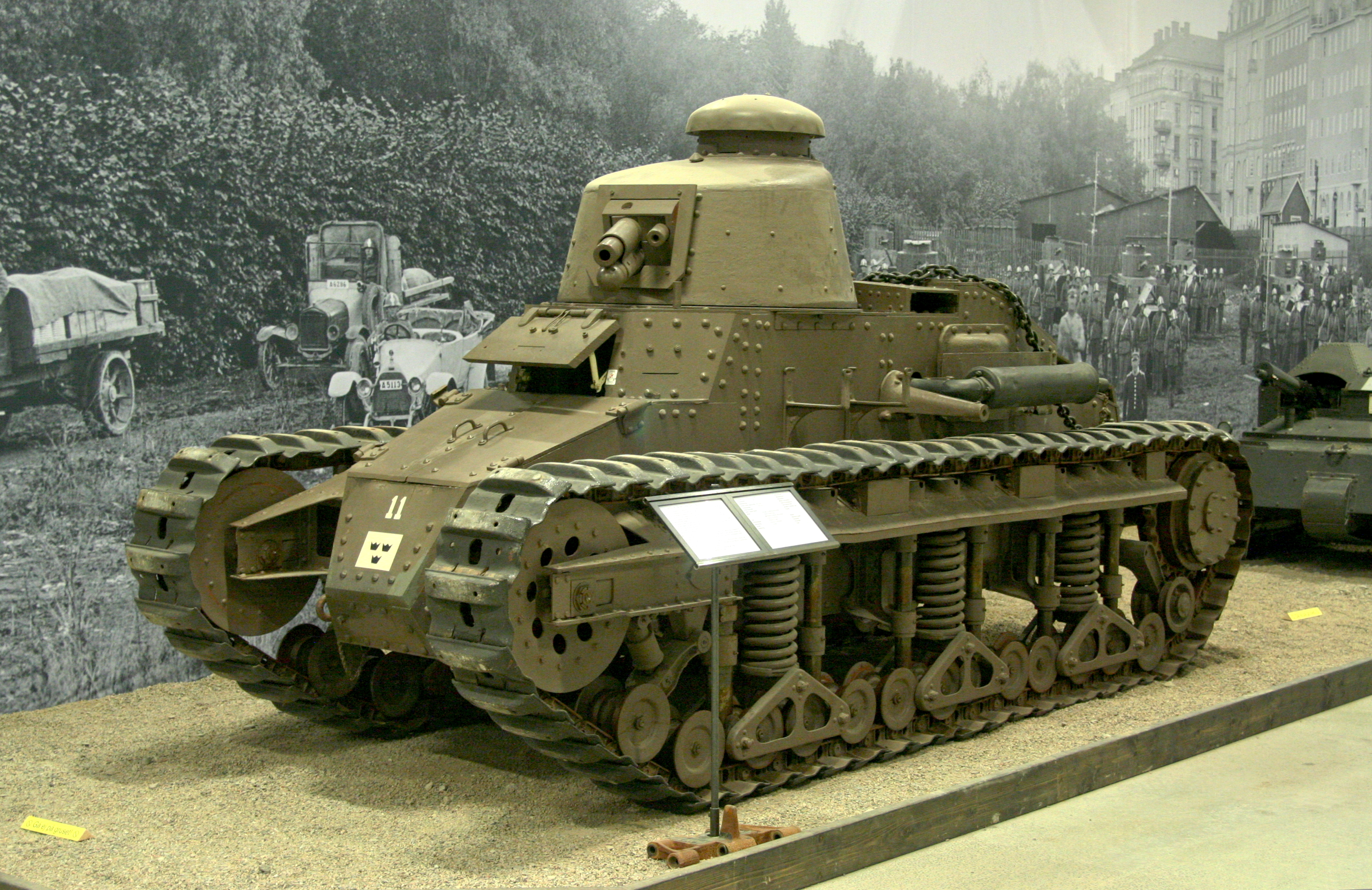
- The sole surviving Renault NC (strv fm/28), at the Swedish tank museum of Arsenalen, Strängnäs, Sweden.
- Type: Light tank
- Place of origin: France

Service history
- In service: 1930–1945? (Japan)
- Used by: Japan
- Wars: Japanese invasion of Manchuria; World War II

Production history
- Designer: Louis Renault
- Designed: 1923
- Manufacturer: Renault
- Developed from: Renault FT
- Developed into: Renault NC-3
- Produced: 1925–1929
- No. built: 12+
- Variants: NC-1, NC-2

Specifications
- Mass: 8.5 tons
- Crew: 2
- Armor: <34 mm
- Main armament: 37 mm Puteaux SA 18
- Engine: Renault engine 60 hp
- Transmission: Renault transmission
- Suspension: vertical springs
- Maximum speed: 18 km/h
- Steering system: Steering levers

Renault NC is a French light tank developed by Louis Renault in the 1920s as a rebuild for existing Renault FTs, but which was only produced in limited numbers for the export market.

A sole Renault NC survives, a Swedish strv fm/28, located at the Swedish tank museum Arsenalen, in Strängnäs, Sweden.

== Development ==
The NC started as a parallel development of the FT Kégresse. Louis Renault had obtained an order in 1923 to build two new prototypes as a parallel modification project, with the factory designation Renault NC; it was intended to feature not only an improved suspension system but also a more powerful engine. Like "FT", "NC" is a combination of code letters devoid of any meaning.

Two prototype designs started construction: NC-1 and NC-2. The second prototype, NC-2, happened to be finished first, in December 1925. It was fitted with a modified Kégresse leaf spring suspension and a 62 hp engine. This line of development was discontinued however.

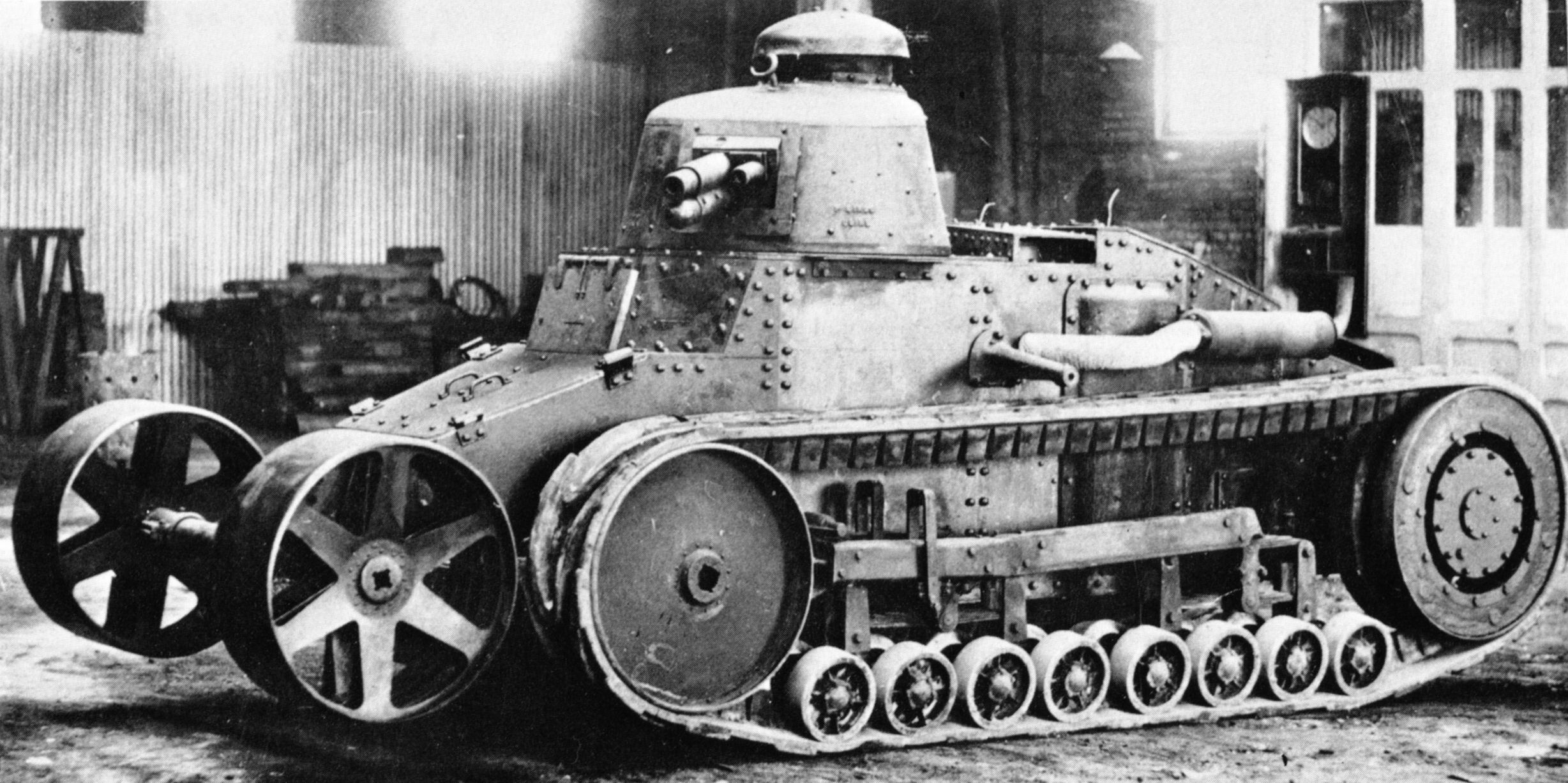
NC-2 prototype (1926)

Renault NC-2's suspension

The NC-1 prototype was finished second and had a different suspension system, with twelve wheels and three large vertical coil springs per side. It allowed for a top speed of 18.5 km/h, making it in 1926 the fastest French tank ever developed. This design would later be sold as the NC-27.

Renault NC-1 prototype

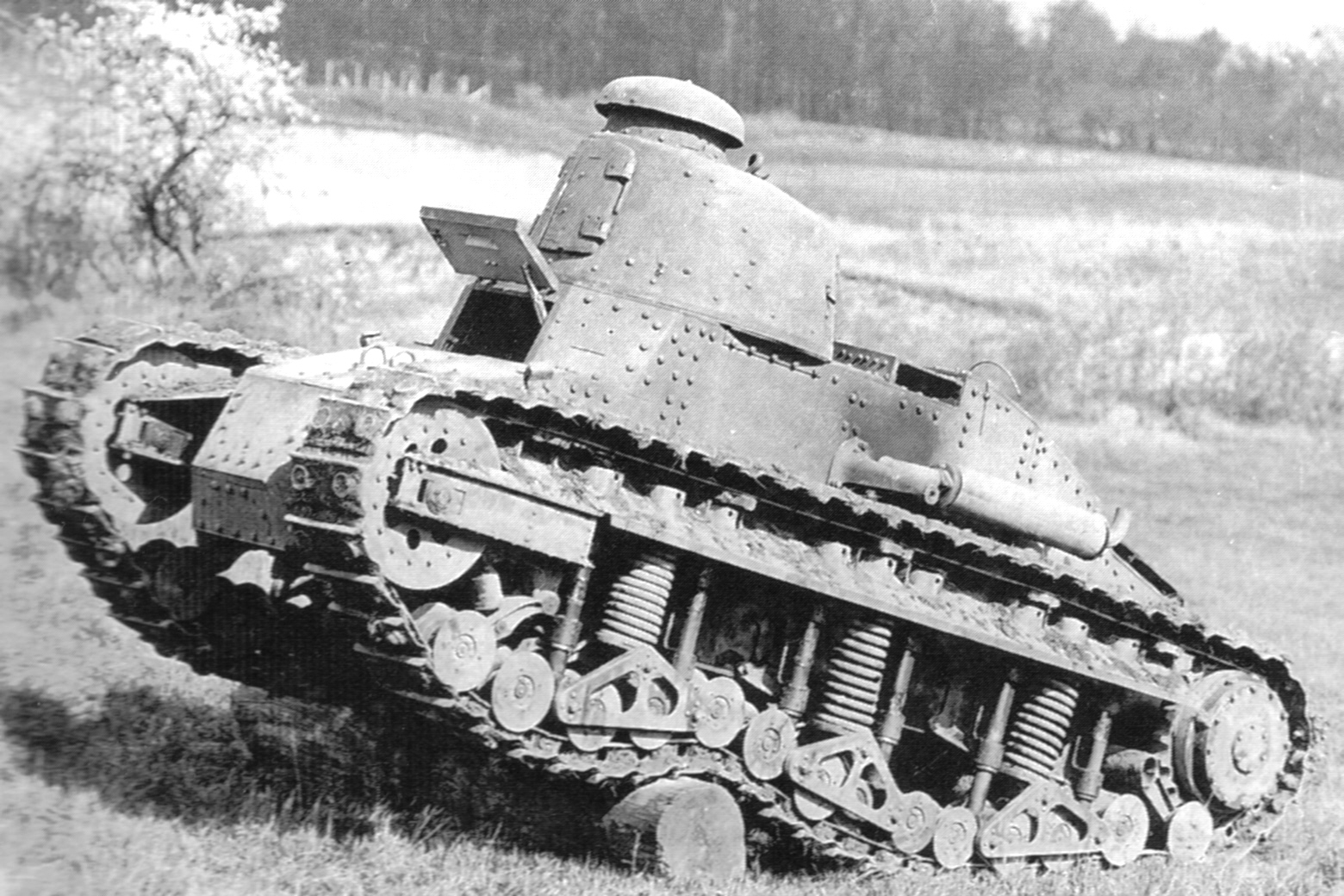
Renault NC-1 during testing

As had been the case for the Renault FT Kégresse, this project was still primarily intended to result in a modification proposal to rebuild existing Renault FTs. In 1926 it transpired that the Char de Bataille project, that later resulted in the Char B1, was evolving into a far heavier tank than at first intended. It would be impossible to procure this heavier design in sufficient numbers and therefore specifications were made in the Infantry Plan 1926 for a new Char léger d'accompagnement d'infanterie, a "light infantry support tank". Renault immediately tried to offer his NC-1 as the logical candidate for this role. However, the Renault NC did not meet any of these criteria, and did not garner interest. There was some hope with the French cavalry, but that branch was not interested either.

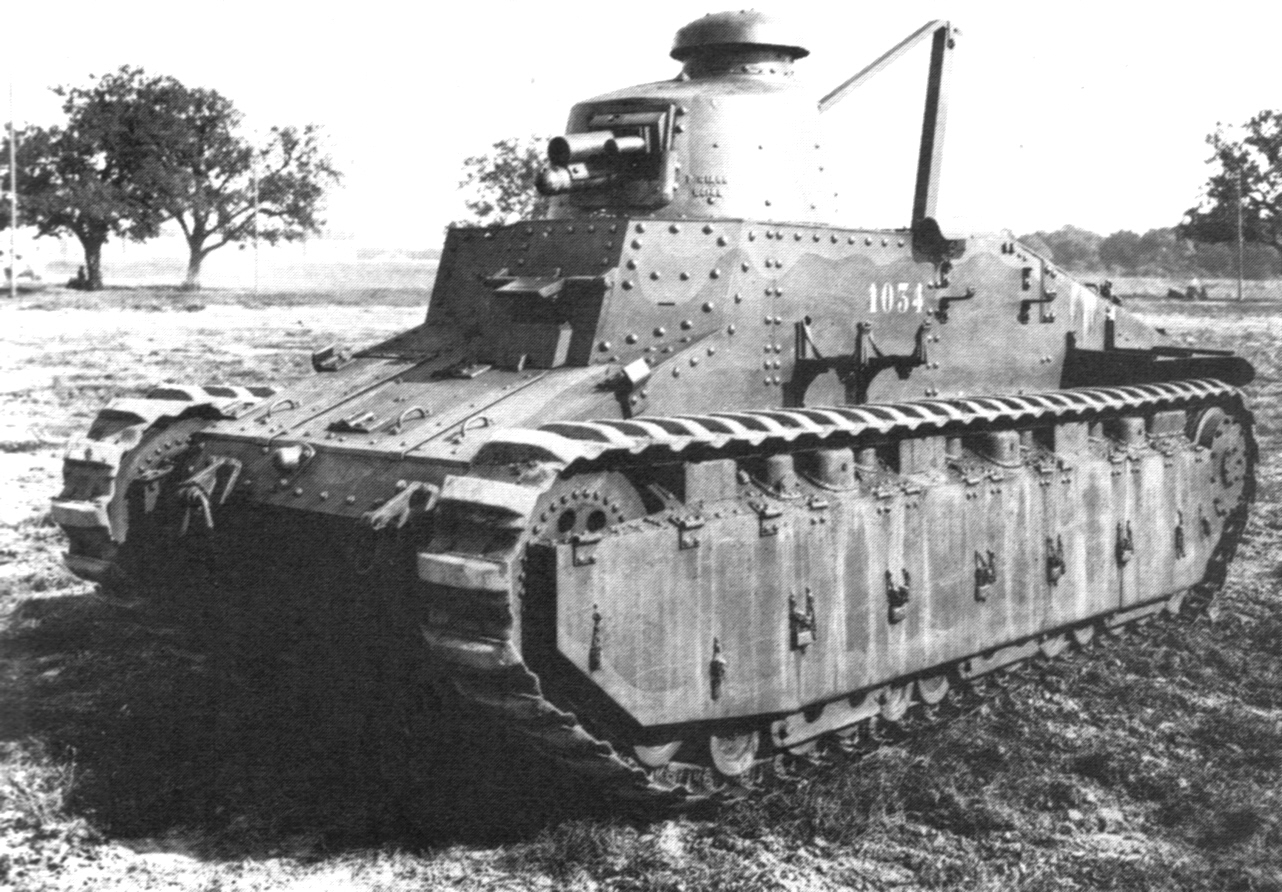
Renault NC-3, a completely new design which lead to the Char D1

Due to this situation, Renault had to turn to export to profit from the design. However, he also started on a new design to compete with the new specifications, becoming the NC-3 prototype, which eventually turned into the Char D1.

== Export ==
As the French Army turned elsewhere for their future tank acquisition, Renault turned to the export market to sell his design. It received the index NC-27 and followed the NC-1 pattern. The NC-2 is sometimes claimed to have been marketed for export as the NC-31, and that such were built for China, but this is incorrect. The NC-2 pattern remained as a single prototype.

By the end of the decade, Renault had managed to sell the vehicle in limited numbers, but it never became a major export vehicle akin to the Renault FT.

=== Poland ===
The first buyer of NC-27 tanks was Poland, which ordered one tank in 1928, along with five Renault FT Kégresse.

The tanks were trialed along each other, but after lengthy trials, the Poles declined any further purchases. The Polish already had more than 150 Renault FT tanks, and the improvements offered by the NC and FT Kégresse were not sufficient to warrant a purchase.

Renault NC-27 on trials in Poland

Renault FT Kégresse in Poland

=== Sweden: stridsvagn fm/28 ===
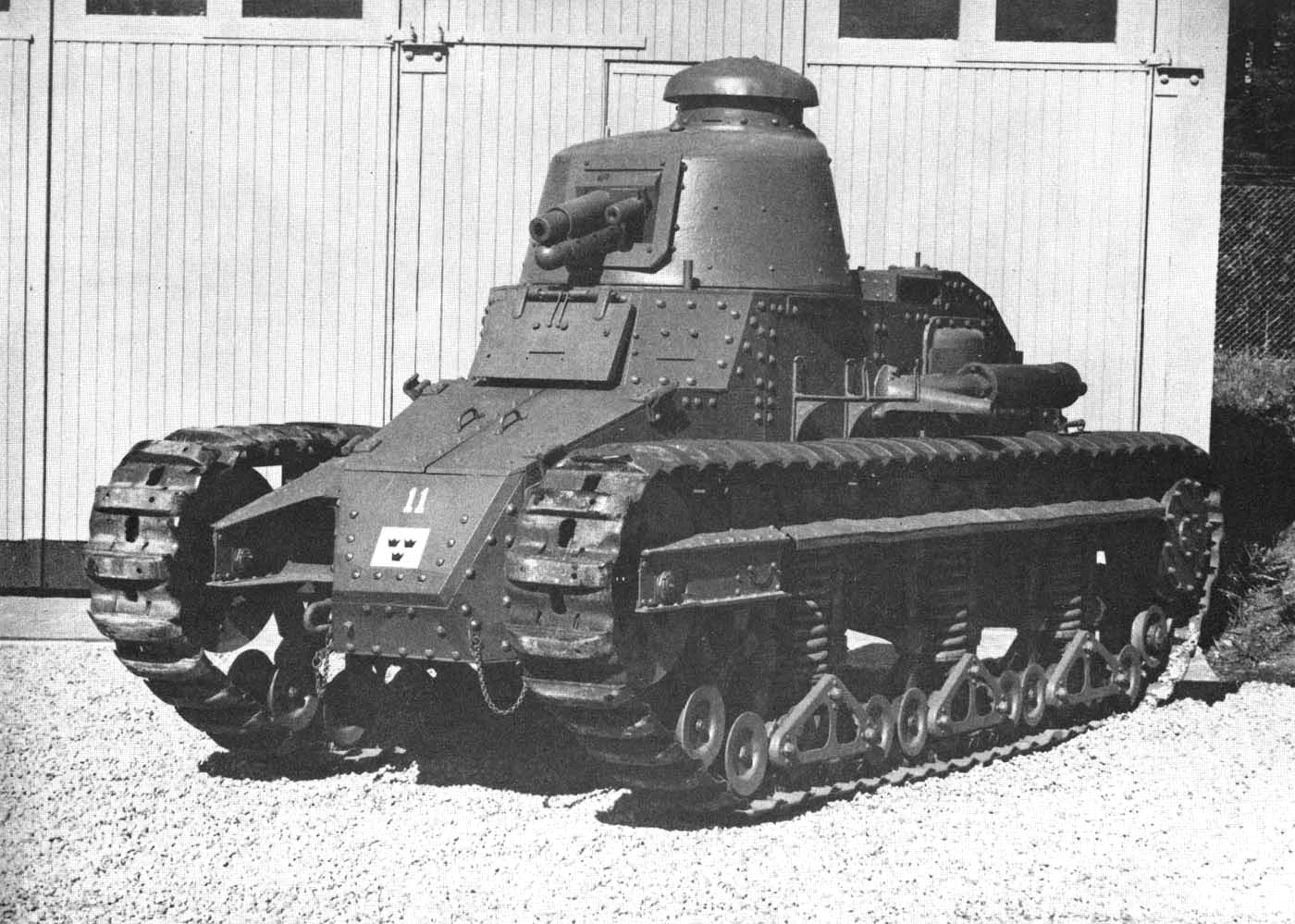
The Swedish Renault NC-27: stridsvagn fm/28

In 1928 a single NC prototype was bought by Sweden as an experimental tank, designated stridsvagn försöksmodell 1928 (strv fm/28), lit. 'tank trialmodel 1928'. The tank was bought due to indigenous tank development dragging on, leading to the purchase in order evaluate alternatives.

The NC-design showed its issues from the very start. The gearbox and clutch were not reliable and the suspension was not suited for Swedish terrain. The trials resulted in no further interest, and instead convinced the Swedish Army that tanks had to be developed locally and not bought elsewhere.

The vehicle, however, ended up being useful for more than just trials. The tactical and technical requirements for a new tank were composed after studying the fm/28, and the vehicle came to serve as a training tank for some time.

The sole strv fm/28 still survives and is today displayed at the Swedish tank museum Arsenalen in Strängnäs Sweden.

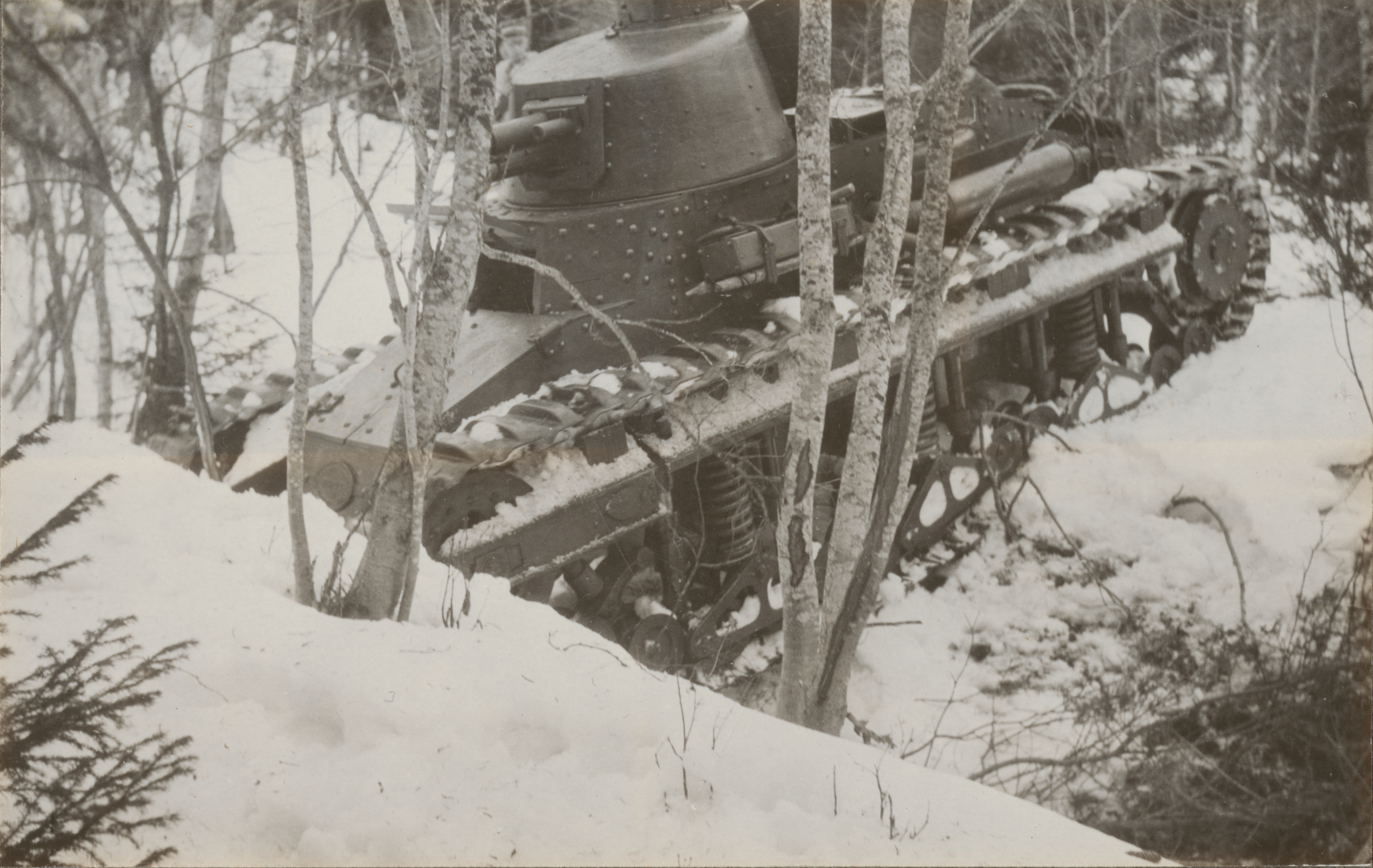
The strv fm/28 in forested winter terrain during trials

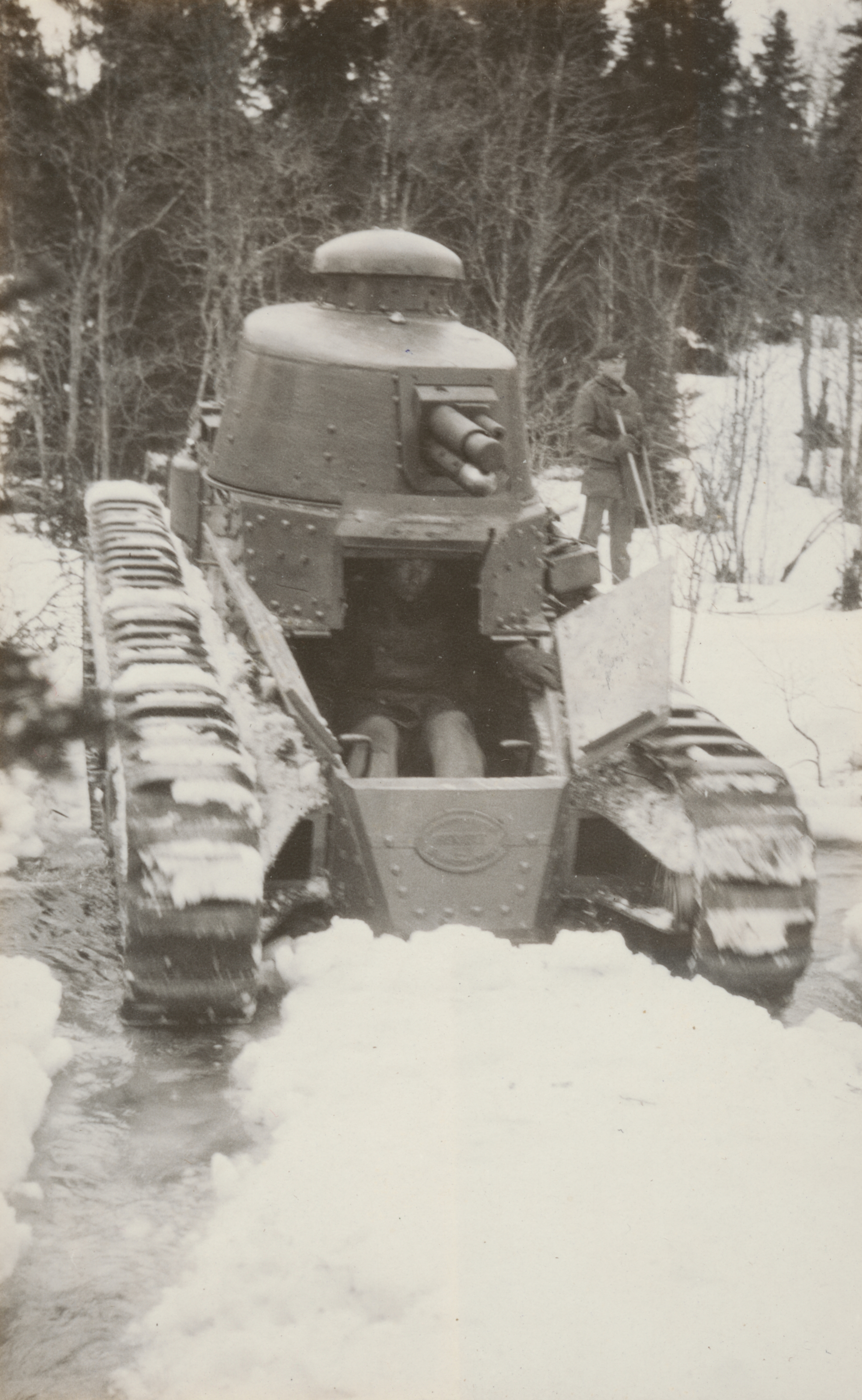
The strv fm/28 driving in a creek during winter trials

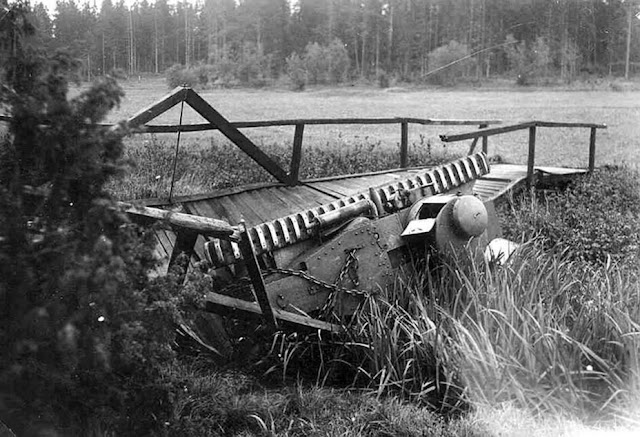
The strv fm/28 having collapsed a bridge and fallen over during trials

=== Japan: Type 89 Otsu-Gata Sensha ===
In 1929, Renault obtained an order of ten vehicles for Japan, who, in wait of indigenous tank-development, bought the entire remaining stock of 10 vehicles to backup their aging Renault FT tanks; the FT:s then being designated "Renault A-type tank" (ルノー甲型戦車, Renault Ko-Gata Sensha), and the NC:s "Renault B-type tank" (ルノー乙型戦車, Renault Otsu-Gata Sensha).

In 1930, Japan received the Renault NC tanks ordered. Due to the same design issues that Sweden encountered, the Japanese took it on to themselves to correct the drawbacks of the imported tanks. According to French sources, the tanks, indexed Type 89, received more powerful Mitsubishi engines of 75 hp, enough to accelerate the tank to 20 kph. The 37 mm SA 18 cannons were replaced with Type 11 37 mm infantry guns or 6.5 mm Type 1 heavy machine guns or Type 3 heavy machine guns. The gun shared an ancestor with the SA 18: the French Canon d'Infanterie de 37 modèle 1916 TRP, however, it was more powerful, and could be used in an anti-tank role. As a result, the Type 89 was the most heavily armed tank from the Renault FT family.

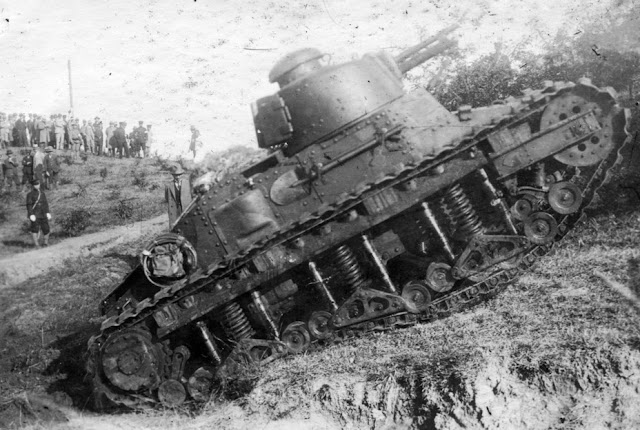
Otsu-Gata Sensha with a 37 mm Type 11 cannon

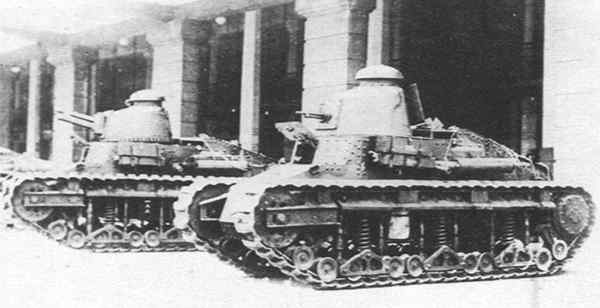
Otsu-Gata Sensha with a 6.5 mm Type 1 machine gun (closest)

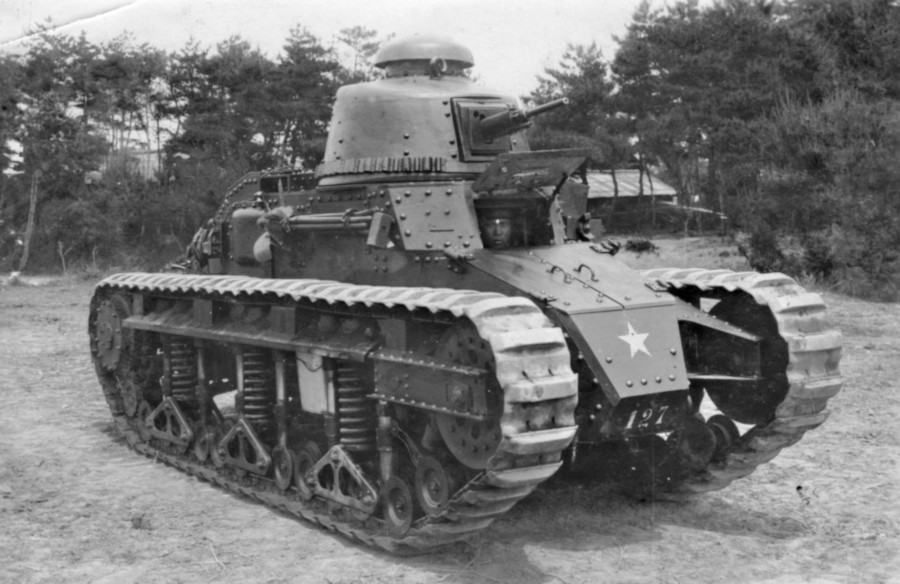
Otsu-Gata Sensha with a 6.5 mm Type 3 machine gun captured by USA

== See also ==
- Tanks of France
- Tanks of Japan
- Tanks of Sweden
