= Char D1 =

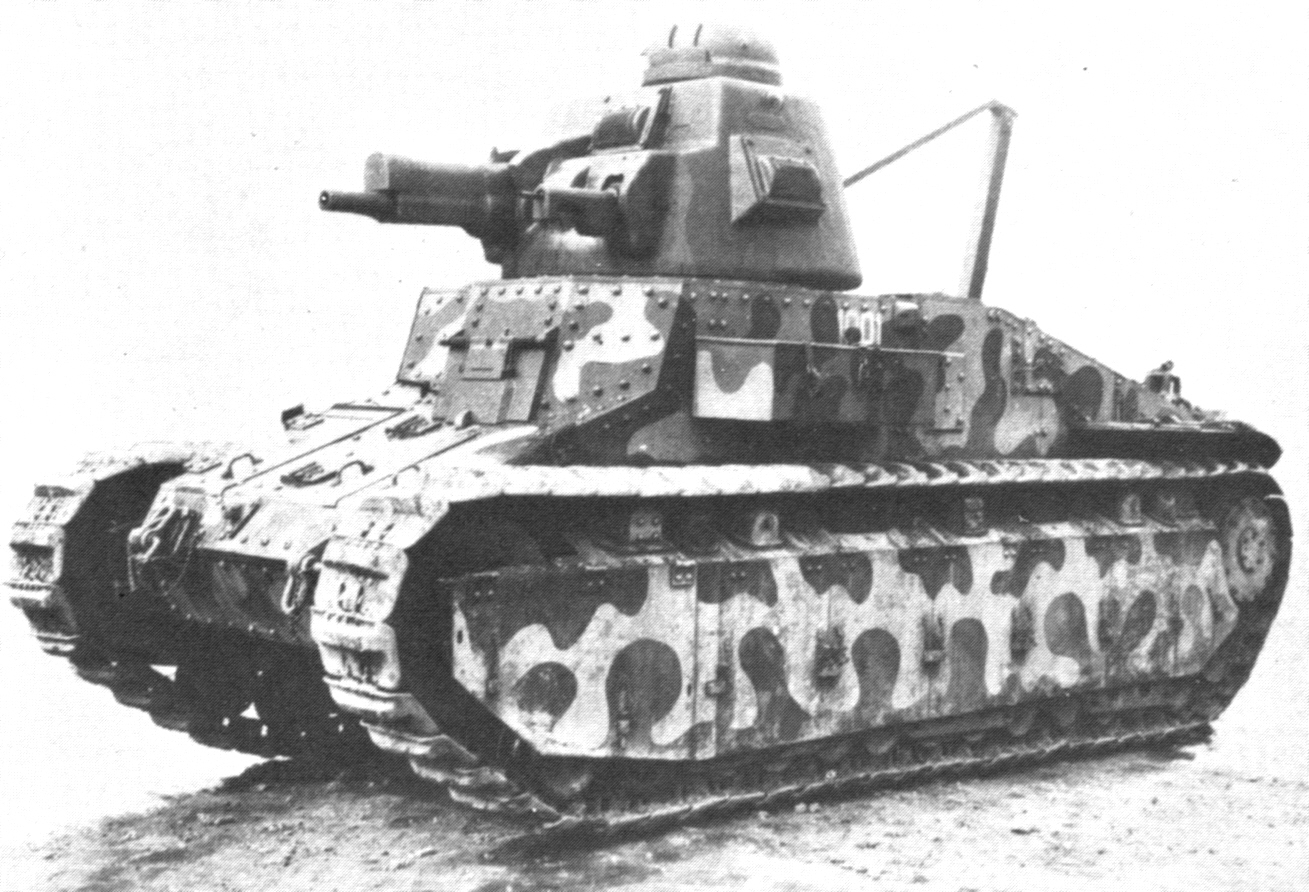
- D1 with ST2 turret in 1936
- Type: Light tank
- Place of origin: France

Service history
- In service: 1932 - 1943

Production history
- Manufacturer: Renault
- No. built: 160

Specifications
- Mass: 14 metric tons (15.43 short tons)
- Length: 5.76 m (18 ft 10.8 in)
- Width: 2.16 m (7 ft 1 in)
- Height: 2.40 m (7 ft 10.5 in)
- Crew: 3
- Armor: 40 mm
- Main armament: 47 mm SA 34 tank gun
- Secondary armament: 2x 7.5 mm Reibel machine gun
- Engine: Renault V-4; 74 hp
- Power/weight: 5.29 hp/t
- Suspension: vertical springs
- Operational range: 90 km
- Maximum speed: 18.6 km/h (11.6 mph)

The Char D1 was an Interwar French light tank.

The French plan of 1926, calling for the creation of a Light Infantry Support Tank, led to the development of the existing Renault NC-1 prototype into the Char D1. One hundred and sixty vehicles of this type were produced between 1931 and 1935. There was a pre-series of ten vehicles and later 150 standard vehicles were built. Until 1936 the vehicles were fitted with Renault FT turrets because the intended cast ST2 turrets were not yet ready. The ST2 turret was armed with a short 47mm SA 34 tank gun with a coaxial 7.5mm machine gun. The hull carried a 7.5mm MG in the bow. The type did not serve as an infantry support tank as originally intended, but as France's major battle tank of the early 1930s; it was quickly phased out in 1937 because of its mechanical unreliability and relegated to colonial units in North Africa.

== Development ==
After World War I, France possessed a very large fleet of Renault FT light infantry support tanks. Although many of these were sold to other nations, over 2800 remained. In contrast to the United Kingdom, which greatly reduced its armoured forces and scrapped redundant AFVs after the war, France maintained a large number of active or reserve armoured units (with an organic tank strength of about 1260) and all of the remaining Renault FTs were kept in working order. This implied that in the early twenties France had the strongest and most modern armoured force in the world, but this very fact led to a state of complacency. Development of new tank models was not seen as urgent, and budgetary restraints would for the immediate future prohibit any further tank production. When in 1922 General Jean Baptiste Eugène Estienne concluded an official study containing guidelines for long term tank design, no provisions were made for any new light infantry tank.

The remaining Renault FT vehicles, though having shown themselves to be very effective in trench warfare, were not well adapted in their present state of technological development to peacetime conditions. The main problem was their low top speed, which necessitated special tank transporters whenever the vehicles had to be moved outside their base area and made them fundamentally unsuited to patrolling duty in the colonies. It was therefore decided to modify a number of existing vehicles, by fitting them with a more effective suspension system – becomming the Renault FT Kégresse and Renault NC series. Following NC trials, and a limited number of FT Kégresse modifications sent to Morocco, neither solution proved satisfactory and no large scale modernization of the FT fleet came to be.

FT Kégresse 28 March 1928

Renault NC-1 prototype

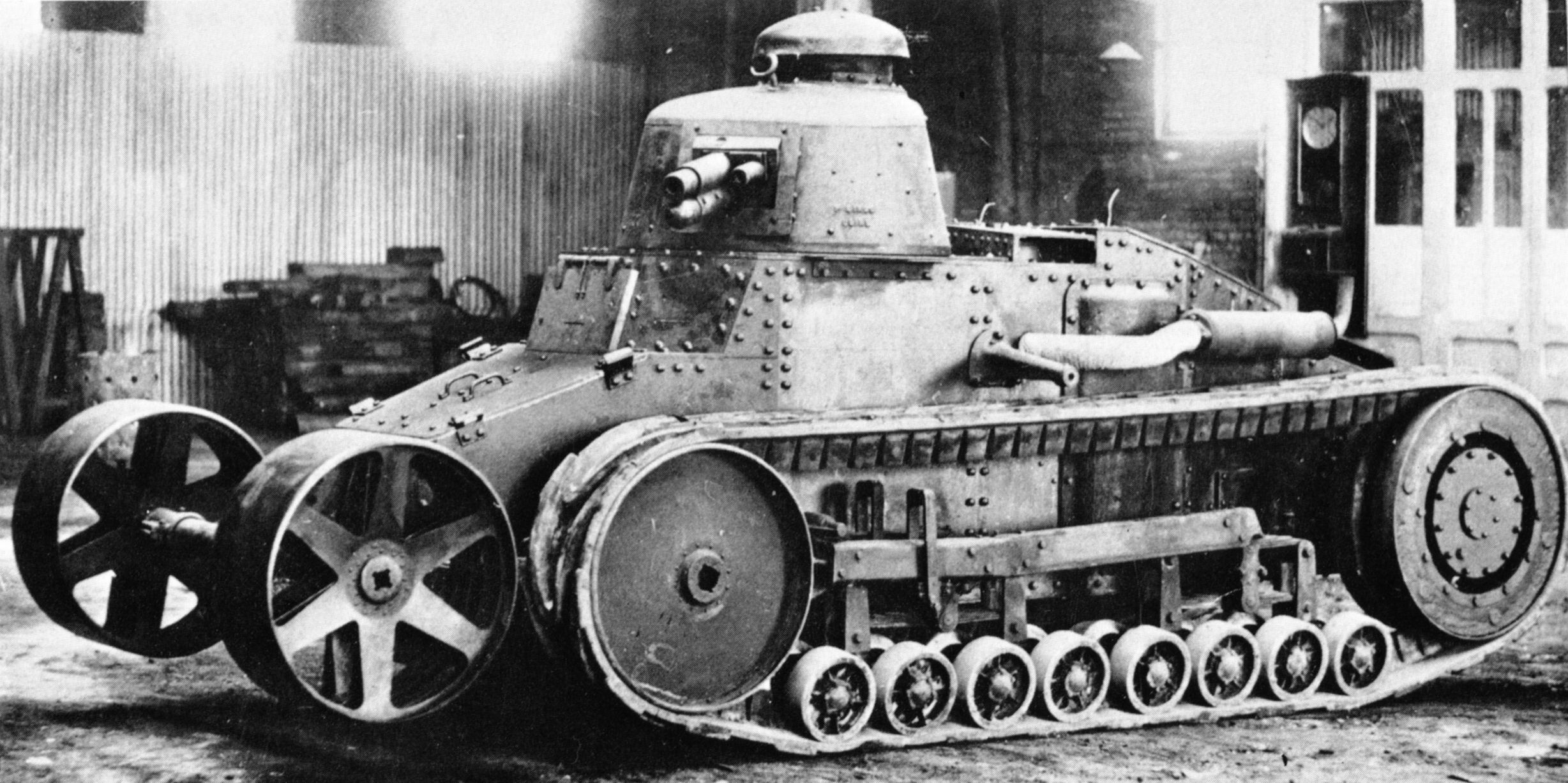
Renault NC-2 prototype

=== NC-31 ===
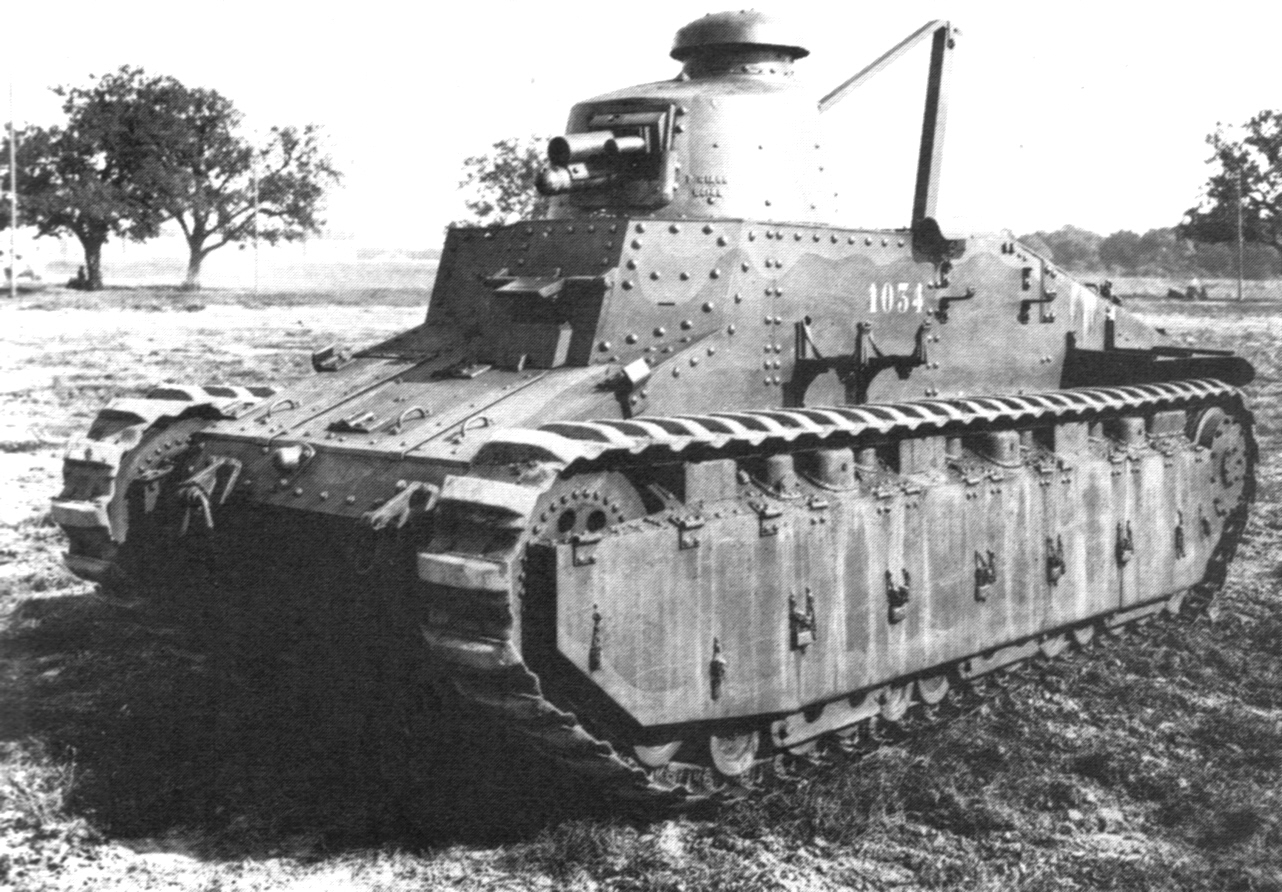
Renault NC-31 (NC-3)

In 1926 it transpired that the Char de Bataille project, that later resulted in the Char B1, was evolving into a far heavier tank than at first intended. It would be impossible to procure this heavier design in sufficient numbers and therefore specifications were made in the Infantry Plan 1926 for a new Char léger d'accompagnement d'infanterie, a "light infantry support tank". Renault immediately tried to offer his NC as the logical candidate for this role.

In 1928, Renault succeeded in his attempt to get his Renault NC accepted as the basis for further light infantry tank development; he was granted an order to build two prototypes. The Army called this project the Char D, Renault used the designation NC-28. Of the two prototypes, the first was fitted with the twin machine gun turret of the SRA Char de Bataille prototype. Also a new suspension system was tested incorporating the special chenille légère ("light track") designed by Colonel Balland, which was optimised for high speeds. As this vehicle was a derivative of the NC-1, it was later indicated with the designation NC-2, creating confusion with the earlier project of that name; many later books assumed they were one and the same vehicle, repeating mistakes in the 1935 edition of Heigl's Taschenbuch der Panzer. The Army made a choice in March 1929 for the second prototype, the NC-3 gun tank, and ordered a pre-series of ten vehicles in December 1929. These had the Renault factory designation NC-31, after the intended year of delivery. Renault merely had to build the hulls at a price of 400,000 FF each; the cast turrets were, as usual in France, separately ordered with the Schneider company; they were of the ST1 type (Schneider Tourelle 1). As this turret was much wider than the Renault FT turret used on all previous NC models, Renault broadened the hull accordingly; the typical tapering nose point of the Renault FT was abandoned. The ten hulls were delivered between May and November 1931: after an interval of ten years after the delivery of the last Char 2C in 1921, French tank series production for the home market was thus resumed.

The ten pre-series hulls were tested by the 503e Régiment de Chars de Combat. Many shortcomings were discovered by the Commission de Bourges, the French Infantry matériel commission. Steering was difficult, the suspension too weak and the exhaust pipes overheated the engine compartment. Nevertheless, the type was accepted for mass production — the commission had little choice in this as the main series had already been ordered — provided that changes were made. The strangely squeezed ST1 turret, the first ten of which were delivered from November 1930, was rejected though as being unacceptably cramped and unbalanced. To avoid having to lower the gun breech into the fighting compartment each time the gun was loaded so as to allow a round to be inserted, the main armament had been placed in a very forward position. The ST1 turrets were therefore removed from the first ten vehicles.

=== Char D1 ===
On 23 December 1930, a first order of 70 main production series vehicles was made, followed on 12 July 1932 by a second order of 30; the last order on 16 October 1933 was of 50 vehicles, for a total of 150, delivered between January 1932 and early 1935, at a price of 375,000 FF per hull. Including the NC-31s the series numbers were 1,000-1,160. The factory designation was still Renault NC.

The series vehicles had many improvements: a Cleveland differential; a 74 hp instead of a 65 hp engine; the exhaust pipes were placed to the right, no longer crossing the engine room and there were support rollers fitted to prevent resonance in the top track run. Finally, the fuel tank was enlarged to 165 litres and a new radiator was fitted.

In May 1930, Renault was asked to develop two derived types, the Char D2 and the Char D3; the original Char D now received as designation Char D1.

== Belgian production plans ==
In 1931, it was generally expected that Belgium would soon start to replace its ageing Renault FTs. Early 1932 the Belgian company Cockerill, based at Seraing near Liège, approached Renault to inform whether it could take the Char D into licence production, purely for the Belgian market. Louis Renault in turn on 25 March 1932 asked permission from the French Ministry of Defence to allow Cockerill to produce a French tank, arguing that the close military ties between the two nations favoured such an undertaking. On 13 April the Ministry answered that Renault seemed to have forgotten to indicate to which type exactly his request pertained, though this matter was quite relevant "given the secret character presented by certain of your matériel". Three days later Renault admitted that he had referred to the Char D, "older matériel obviously being incapable of interesting that nation". In that case, the ministry replied on 21 April, it regrettably had to withhold its permission: no types more modern than the Renault FT or NC could be destined for licence production. The main objection was that the secrets of the cast armour technology of the ST-turret should not be compromised.

Renault tried to overturn this decision by lobbying with his army contacts. On 26 April he noted that General Maurice Gamelin had promised to use his influence to promote Renault's project; the next day, however, it transpired that the deputy chief of the general staff General Joseph-Edouard-Aimé Doumenc had vetoed the idea, with the argument that, apart from the secrecy problem, it was best to keep the employment in France. Renault protested that Belgium would not import tanks anyway, in view of its balance of payments difficulties and that "if we don't do it, Vickers will", but on 29 June had to report Cockerill that the plans could not proceed; he suggested that Belgium simply import his tanks, but in fact it was indeed the British Vickers company of which the models would be taken into licence production by Belgium.

== Description ==
The Char D1's Renault FT ancestry can still be seen from the sloping engine deck and the profile of the side armour plates; it is also still a rather narrow vehicle, only 2.16 metre wide. Its length is 5.76 metre with tail. The riveted hull armour is thirty mm thick on all vertical surfaces, ten mm on top and bottom. The NC-31 introduced a 10 mm protection plate for the suspension units; the lower hull side armour beneath it was probably 16 or 25 mm thick — the exact data have been lost. For its time the Char D1 was relatively well armoured; as a result the hull alone weighs 11 metric tons, rather heavier than a typical light tank of the period. A 74 hp V-4 engine of 6.08 litre renders a top speed of 18.6 km/h; the range is ninety kilometres; it can climb a 110 cm obstacle and a 50% slope, cross a 220 cm trench and wade through 90 cm of water. The type thus had a relatively good mobility for the early thirties. In the hull are two crew members. The first is the driver who, as with the Renault FT, is seated below large double hatches that form the nose plates. He can operate, via a steel cable, a fixed 7.5 mm Reibel machine gun low in the nose, that is almost completely hidden behind the armour. The second crew member operates the radio set on the right side of the fighting compartment, the set being an ER (Émetteur-Récepteur or "emitter-receiver") 51 for the NC-31s and an ER52 or 53 for the series vehicles. At the right of the engine deck a very distinctive and robust radio antenna frame is fitted, its point the highest of the vehicle at 2.4 metres. It impedes a full rotation of the turret to the right, limiting the total movement to about 345°. The radio operator also assists in the loading of the gun, by handing over rounds taken from the munition load of 76 to the third crew member, the commander, located in the turret.

As the ST1 turret type had been rejected, a new one had to be developed. Until it was ready all 160 Char D vehicles were temporarily fitted with existing Renault FT turrets, taken from the Renault FT matériel reserve. Two new turret designs were proposed by Schneider. The ST3 was a modification of the ST1. To solve the balance problem, this type had an armoured extension at the back, with a large square opening. The hatch in the back of the main armour could be opened through the square hole of the extension, providing more room for the commander, who, when operating the gun, would still enjoy some protection against small arms fire, without the weight penalty of a larger turret. The matériel commission judged this system, though ingenious, to be hugely impractical — it made the turret more vulnerable in precisely those situations where it was most likely to be hit: when fighting the enemy — and decided to accept the weight penalty, choosing the alternative ST2 that was simply a larger turret that had more room at the back, weighing three metric tonnes. Nevertheless, a single pre-series vehicle was fitted with the ST3 for trials and afterwards used in this configuration by the driver school.

This ST2 turret had a very complex geometry with many shot traps. This was partly caused by the large protruding diascopes at the sides, but also a result of forcing the commander to operate in three height levels: he had to stretch himself to observe his surroundings via the cupola, had a forward observation hatch that he could look through while standing in a normal position and had to crouch to operate the 47 mm SA 34 gun to the right of him and the coaxial 7.5 mm machine gun to the left. The lower level had its own extension, where extra room had been found in the front of the turret to bring the machine gun forward, while retracting the main gun, thus improving balance even further. Needless to say, the army was very critical of this general arrangement, but it could not be rejected as deliveries were already greatly delayed: the first replacement turrets were fitted only in early 1936.

The ST2, weighing 1788 kg, brought the total weight to fourteen metric tons and, costing 100,000 FF per piece, the total vehicle price to 475,000 FF. The Char D1 was thus neither particularly light nor cheap, causing the Hotchkiss company to propose a design better conforming to the role of mass-produced light infantry tank, which proposal would eventually result in no less than three production types: the Hotchkiss H35, Renault R35 and FCM 36. However, even in 1926 the project had been seen as more of a cheaper alternative to the Char B than as a pure light infantry tank; the political situation of the early thirties would force the Char D1 completely into the role of Char de Bataille or "battle tank".

== Operational history ==
=== Char de Bataille ===
In 1932, the Char D1 was the most — indeed the only — modern tank matériel available to the French Army. Therefore, it was out of the question to delegate this type to the role of mere infantry support. It now should function as the Char de Bataille, with the main task of fighting enemy armour, as was shown by the choice for a 47 mm gun and the presence of radio sets. The ten NC-31s were used for driver training; the other vehicles were allocated to three battalions, one each in 507, 508 and 510 RCC, the elite tank units. As the threat of war steadily increased, first through Soviet military build-up and then because of Germany's rearmament, the modern equipment was supposed to show to foreign powers that France was still a force to be reckoned with. For the regiments receiving the new tank, it was a grave disappointment however. The main reason for this, besides the fact that the obsolete Renault FT turrets had to be used for the first four years, lay in its very poor mechanical reliability. In March 1934, when 110 vehicles had been delivered, it was reported that seventeen of these were already worn out and had to return to the factory for a complete rebuild; of the remaining 93, 62 were non-operational because of major defects. The burn-through of brakes and transmissions was common; the armour plates were bent out of shape because the chassis was not stiff enough, their rivets regularly snapping. The fundamental cause of this was that the Renault design team tended to solve the problem of how to combine low weight with low cost by applying weak components of inferior steel quality: other Renault designs as the AMR 33, AMC 35 and Char D2 suffered from comparable problems. In 1935 a large maintenance programme was started to improve the Char D1's mechanical reliability; but when in March 1936 the elite units had to hurry to the German border in reaction to the Rhineland Crisis, it became painfully obvious how poor their readiness still was. The new ST2 turret only worsened the situation: the glass of the diascopes was discovered to shatter by mere driving; there was no AP-shot available, except for about twenty tanks equipped with the naval 47 mm gun, fitted because the regular SA 34 was in short supply; the munition racks hadn't yet been changed to hold the larger rounds. The SA 34 was too weak a gun anyway; but the turret was too small to be adapted to the much more powerful 47 mm SA 35. Analysis of the events led the Army to conclude that it should rid itself as soon as possible of the troublesome matériel. Even though some modifications were implemented, such as a changed antenna base that did not obstruct turret rotation, early 1937, when newer types were available, all Char D1s in mainland France were phased out, with the exception of the NC-31s.

=== In exile ===
The Char D1s were thereafter shipped to the typical destination of French army ordnance that was obsolete but too valuable to be scrapped: the colonies. In 1937 they arrived in North-Africa, there to form three new battalions, 61, 65 and 67 BCC, to counter Italy's threat of invading and capturing Tunisia. As the organic strength of each battalion was 45, and one tank had been used to build a radio tank, fourteen Char D1s were allocated to the matériel reserve. Remarkably, since even a reserve of this size was insufficient given the poor reliability, a Cavalry unit, 5e Chasseurs, was allowed to appropriate twenty tanks for its own use, without any proper authorisation for this.

=== Return to France ===
In May 1940, during the Fall of France, it was decided after the German success of Fall Gelb, to reinforce mainland France with the North-African battalions. Predictably, the readiness of the Char D1s had in the meantime only worsened. It was decided to concentrate all 43 operational vehicles available into 67 BCC, the first unit to be shipped to France. As Italy had not yet declared war, the battalion reached France in relative safety in early June.

On 9 June the main attack of Fall Rot began and on 11 June the German Panzerdivisionen attained a breakthrough. To cover the retreat, 67 BCC on 12 June reinforced the 6th Colonial Infantry Division's defence of the village of Souain, a position blocking 8. Panzerdivision. The 3rd company of the 67 BCC repulsed the first German attacks, destroying four enemy tanks. When it executed a flanking attack, following the official tactical doctrine prescribing that the best way of defence was to use the "shock effect" of an armoured counterstroke, it was itself hit in the flank by 37mm anti-tank fire and lost seven vehicles without any gain. Further German attacks were beaten off, again destroying some enemy tanks. The 2nd company was engaged by German infantry near Suippes. The 6th Colonial Division ordered a withdrawal to the south during the night. During this retreat, the 67 BCC lost most of its tanks. The 3rd company was ambushed and the remaining D1s were left in various villages as an attempt to strengthen their defense. Only four tanks remained on 14 June: three were disabled by their crew and the last one destroyed by an aerial attack.

Of the 43 Char D1s participating in the campaign, 25 were completely destroyed; eighteen were captured by the Germans and given the designation Panzerkampfwagen 732 (f). There is no documented German use of the matériel.

=== Last fights ===
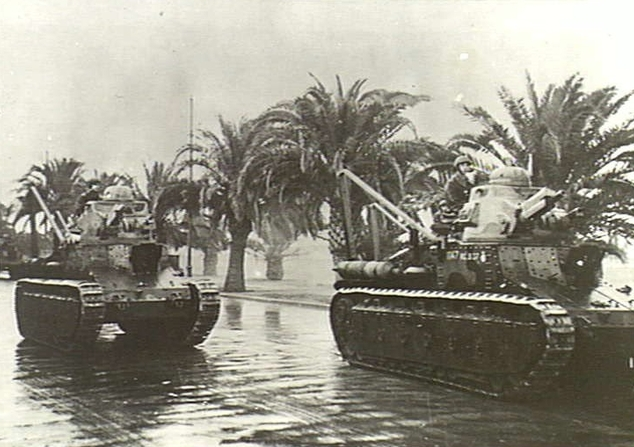
Parade of D1 tanks in Tunis, May 1943.

Under the armistice conditions, France was in principle allowed to keep its remaining (in fact 106) Char D1s in North-Africa. However pure tank units, such as the tank battalions, had to be disbanded and only 62 tanks were divided among 2 and 4 Chasseurs d'Afrique, about forty and twenty respectively plus two tanks for driver training. This posed a problem for 5e Chasseurs that still possessed the twenty clandestine vehicles; only 86 vehicles had been reported. When the Italian armistice control commission visited, these tanks were successfully hidden behind the stable for mad horses.

During Operation Torch, the tanks of the 2 Chasseurs d'Afrique fought near Oran against American M3 Stuarts of 1st Armored Regiment (1st Armored Division) and M3 Gun Motor Carriages of the 601st Tank Destroyer Battalion. One M3 GMC and one Stuart were destroyed but 14 D1s were lost. The French troops rejoined the Allies on 10 November. The remaining Char D1s were concentrated into the Light Mechanized Brigade and fought during the Battle of Kasserine Pass. On this occasion even a Panzerkampfwagen IV was destroyed by Char D1 fire, which was quite a feat given the poor anti-armour capacity of the 47 mm SA 34 gun. Pictures show that in this period the radio frame had been removed. In March 1943, all seventeen surviving Char D1s were phased out in favour of the British Valentine tank. Today not a single Char D1 survives; the only extant related vehicle is one "NC-27" in Sweden.

== The Char Observatoire ==
To ensure adequate coordination between tanks and artillery during modern manoeuvre warfare, good radio connections are essential. Plan 1934 of the Infantry, outlining future tank design, therefore foresaw the production of a special radio tank, the Char Observatoire that was not, as its name might suggest, itself an artillery observation vehicle, but had to transmit information, gathered by the real observation vehicles of the Renault YS type, to the artillery units. In early 1937 at 507 RCC, Charles de Gaulle's regiment, a single Char D1, with series number 1016, was rebuilt as such. Its turret was removed and replaced with an octagonal superstructure on the right side, making room for an extra ER51 long-distance radio set on the left side of the hull. Only one vehicle was experimentally modified this way. After the war it has long been assumed that the surviving pictures of this vehicle showed a presumed command tank, the Char Colonel.

== See also ==
- Tanks of France
