= Char D3 =

- Type: medium tank
- Place of origin: France

Service history
- Wars: none

Production history
- No. built: 1 prototype

The Char D3 was a French tank. It was Char D1's colonial version.

== History ==
In the early 1930s, when Char D1 had not entered production, Renault was ordered to develop an improved version and a colonial version of Char D1. Eventually, the improved version developed into Char D2, and the colonial version developed into Char D3, which has never entered production. Only one prototype was built which was later converted into the Automoteur Garnier-Renault (ACL 75 G-R) self-propelled gun.

== See also ==
- Char D1
- Char D2
