= Char D2 =

Interwar French medium tank

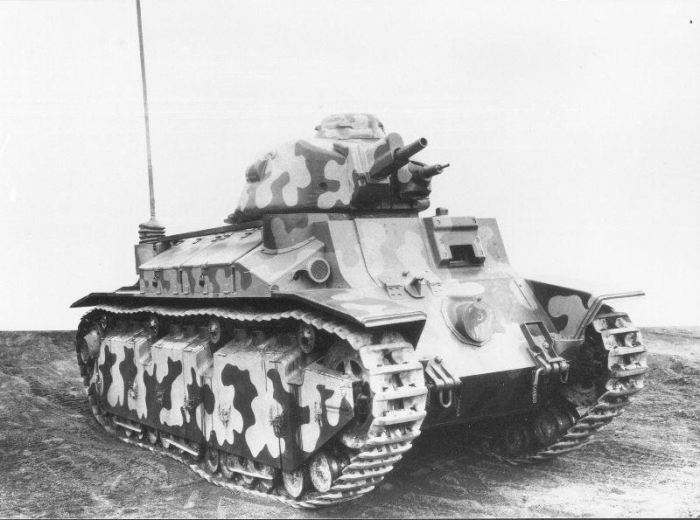
- Type: Medium tank
- Place of origin: France

Service history
- Used by: France
- Wars: World War II

Production history
- Manufacturer: Renault
- Produced: 1936-1940
- No. built: 100

Specifications
- Mass: 19.75 metric tons
- Length: 5.46 m (17 ft 11 in)
- Width: 2.22 m (7 ft 3 in)
- Height: 2.66 m (8 ft 9 in)
- Crew: 3
- Armor: 40 mm
- Main armament: 47 mm SA 34 gun 47 mm SA 35 gun (later models)
- Secondary armament: 2× 7.5 mm MAC 31
- Engine: Renault 6-cylinder 9.5 liters petrol engine 150 hp
- Power/weight: 7.6 hp/tonne
- Suspension: vertical springs
- Operational range: 100 km
- Maximum speed: 23 km/h (14 mph)

The Char D2 was a French medium tank of the interwar period.

In 1930, at a time the Char D1 had not even entered production, the Renault company agreed to build a better armoured version called the Char D2. By not using old-fashioned rivets, it was hoped to save weight. The tank should have the potential to serve as an alternative in the role of battle tank for the heavier Char B1, should the latter be forbidden by treaty. The failure of the armament limitation talks resulted in a severe reduction of the projected manufacture, now in the form of an interim tank. Organisational difficulties with Renault caused the actual production of a first series of fifty to be delayed to the years 1936 and 1937. A second series of fifty was ordered in 1938, despite indications that the type was mechanically unreliable, as a possible cheaper addition to the expensive Char B1. With the latter type, in case of war, only a limited number of armoured divisions for the Infantry Arm could be raised; the Char D2 created the prospect of increasing this. Due to Renault's financial problems, this second, partially improved version, was only realised in early 1940, bringing total production to a hundred.

The three prototypes were, among others, fitted with turrets of the Renault FT during a mock-up. The production models of the first series had the APX-1 turret, armed with a short 47mm SA 34 tank gun. The second series used the much more powerful 47mm SA 35 tank gun; from March 1940 this was retrofitted to a number of the older vehicles, despite a parallel project to rebuild them as flamethrower tanks.

In 1937 the type equipped one tank battalion, which was considered an elite unit, as part of Charles de Gaulle's regiment. It was well-trained in the use of advanced tactics, including the use of radio-sets. In 1940 the effectiveness of this unit had much diminished, because of the worn-out state of its tanks, aggravated by the decision to raise three autonomous tank companies with the new vehicles, even though insufficient trained crews were available. Nevertheless, the Char D2 units fought tenaciously during the Battle of France, losing most of their tanks to mechanical breakdown instead of enemy action.

== Development ==
At the same time the Char D1 was ordered, a plan was made to develop a more modern tank. The Char D1 had already departed from the pure infantry support concept and evolved from a light into a medium tank, capable of fighting enemy armour; this made it the obvious candidate to be quickly changed into a lighter alternative for the Char B1 battle tank, needed because the latter type was in danger of being forbidden by an expected armaments limitation treaty under the auspices of the League of Nations, imposing an upper weight limit of twenty metric tonnes for armoured fighting vehicles.

The Direction de l'Infanterie proposed on 23 January 1930, in a letter to the ministry of defence, to build a better armoured tank, using 40 mm plate, that nevertheless would be swifter at 22 km/h by fitting a 120 hp engine. The weight however should rise only from 14 to 15.5 metric tonnes, made possible by using welded instead of riveted armour plate. On 14 April the plan was approved and in May Louis Renault was contacted, who agreed to develop this type as the Char D2, together with a colonial tank, the Char D3, which would closely resemble its sister project.

To introduce the new welding technique entailed hiring foreign experts, which was very expensive. Renault insisted that the costs would be paid in advance by the French Army, which however had no corresponding budget available. On 8 December 1931 the deadlock was broken by a new agreement: Renault would first build a prototype with a riveted hull, the Renault UZ, which was delivered in April 1932. First the type was tested in Rueil; in May 1933 field tests were carried out by 503e RCC. The type was accepted for production, which decision was affirmed by the Conseil Consultatif de l'Armement on 12 December 1933.

At that moment however, Germany had just left the League of Nations altogether, making the limitation talks irrelevant, from which then France retired also. Existing plans to produce 750 Char D2s, 150 per year for the period 1935–1939, (six hundred to equip twelve battalions and 150 as a matériel reserve) were immediately reduced. On 14 January 1934 the High Command confirmed only the plan of a first production order of fifty. All these decisions were taken on the basis of experience gained with the riveted prototype, though it was well understood that from it no firm conclusions could be drawn on the quality of the intended welded type.

Meanwhile, two welded prototypes had been ordered in December 1932. These were finished in August 1933, but only delivered in November. From December 1934 till the summer of 1935 the Commission de Vincennes used the three available prototypes to test different engine configurations. The riveted hull was equipped with a 120 hp petrol engine; the other two with diesel engines. These were rejected in favour of the petrol engine even though its combination with the intended welded hull had not yet been tested.

Nevertheless, on 29 December 1934 the order of fifty hulls was granted to Renault, at a price of 410,000 French Francs per piece. The turrets were produced separately. First the ST3 turret (Schneider Tourelle 3) had been tested in 1933; then the ST2, at the time seen as a possible standard turret for all heavier tanks, was considered but finally a choice was made to use the APX1, originally developed for the Char B1, costing ₣ 200,000. This turret brought the unit price to ₣ 610,000. The fifty vehicles were only delivered from May 1936.

Due to this delay a planned second order, to be made in 1935, of a hundred, to bring total production to 150 was cancelled. It had been assumed that the lighter Char D2 could be quickly produced as an interim type, to speed the formation of the first Infantry armoured division of the Infantry.

== Description ==
In essence the Char D2 was an improved Char D1. The different turret type used, increased its height somewhat to 266.6 centimetres; the hull was 175.5 centimetres high. The length of the hull, without tail, was 546 centimetres; its width was reduced to 222.3 centimetres through the use of a narrower track, 35 centimetres wide. The suspension was largely identical but the top rollers, to which a tension wheel was added, were placed somewhat higher to prevent track resonance, a persistent problem with the Char D1. The armour plate covering the three vertical coil springs consisted of six instead of eight panels; mud-chutes were added below each top roller. There were three bogies per side, each with four road wheels, a coil spring and two shock absorbers. In front, and at the back below the sprocket, there was a tension wheel with its own damper; identical to the road wheels proper they brought the total number of such wheels to fourteen. Another change was the fenders with large stowage bins that gave the false impression of being part of the main armour.

The production vehicles used far less welded sections than at first intended. To reduce the price, Renault opted to implement a novel construction technique, using large flat screws, serving both as bolts and, applied heated, as rivets, attaching the main armour plates to each other by means of thin connecting steel strips. This way no internal girders, forming a real chassis, were needed. The armour plates were 40 mm thick.

Like with the Char D1 there was a crew of three, but the radio-telegraphy operator sat to the right of the driver instead of the commander, and the antenna, of the ER52 set, has been moved to a position next to him. To make room a hull machine-gun was absent. This new configuration had been demanded to create a roomier fighting compartment. Two command vehicles, series numbers 2016 and 2049, had a second antenna on the left to serve their ER51 long range set. The engine power was increased considerably to 150 hp by installing a Renault V-6 9.5 litres motor, but as the weight increased to 19.75 (just below the twenty tonne limit) instead of the intended 15.5 metric tonnes, the gain in maximum speed was only to 23 km/h. The gear box had four speeds. Four fuel tanks together holding 352 litres allowed for a range of a hundred kilometres. The wading capacity was 120 centimetres, a trench of 210 centimetres could be crossed, an obstacle eighty centimetres high or a slope of 50% climbed. The hull had a fixed 7.5 mm machine-gun low in the glacis on the right side.

The commander was the sole occupant of the APX1 turret, acting also as gunner and loader for the 47 mm SA 34 gun, which had a limited anti-tank capacity, and the optionally coaxial 7.5 mm Châtellerault machine-gun. The gun could fire two types of ammunition: a HE (High Explosive) called the Obus D with a shell weight of 1250 gramme and a muzzle velocity of 490 m/s; and an APHE (Armour-Piercing High Explosive), the Obus B Modèle 1932, with a shell weight of 1410 gramme, an explosive charge of 142 gramme and a muzzle velocity of 480 m/s. It rendered an armour penetration of just about 25 millimetres at a distance of a hundred metres, barely enough to be effective against light armoured vehicles.

== Second production batch ==
The first fifty vehicles, series numbers 2004 - 2053 (the three prototypes used numbers 2001 - 2003), having been delivered between 9 May 1936 and 23 February 1937, the ministry of defence decided on 10 April 1937, confirmed by the Conseil Consultatif de l'Armement in May 1937, to place a second order of fifty vehicles. This was done in the context of an ongoing discussion whether or not to proceed with the production of the expensive and obsolescent Char B1; continued production of the Char D2 kept all options open. Renault gave the assurance that his factory could manufacture two hundred units per year. During 1937 the first reports regarding the operational use of the type were rather alarming in that they clearly indicated an unreliable vehicle. Despite hesitations the order was actually made in June 1938. However, production at first failed to materialise due to severe financial and social problems with Renault. This aggravated the reliability problems for the existing vehicles as also insufficient spare parts were manufactured.

At the same time the production process of another Renault tank type, the AMC 35, was faltering. Interest in the AMC 35 project was more or less kept alive by a foreign buyer, i.c. Belgium, and something similar happened for the Char D2. In August 1938 a commission arrived from Poland, investigating whether the Char D2 could be produced for that country, using an export credit of a billion franc that Poland had obtained in September 1936 to procure French weaponry. Initially Poland had favoured the more modern SOMUA S35 but sales of that type had been denied, priority being given to the needs of the French army. Negotiations, complicated by issues of technology transfer and a possible licence production, failed at first; however, early 1939 directing the second production batch to Poland was considered, but this was eventually forbidden by the French supreme commander Maurice Gamelin. He had learned that the condition of the first fifty vehicles was so poor that the best way to keep the single battalion equipped with the type operational was a complete replacement of the older with the newer vehicles. The first batch could then be rebuilt into flamethrowers.

After the start of the Second World War Édouard Daladier on 27 September 1939 decided that the type would not be among the few chosen for further mass production but that the second order would nevertheless have to be completed to indeed allow a replacement; a first batch of fifteen flamethrowers was ordered. This also implied that funds were made available to recommence manufacture at Renault. Plans foresaw a delivery of five vehicles in February 1940, eight in March and then ten units each month until the last seven would be delivered in July. In fact in February six vehicles were produced, in March seventeen; six in April; thirteen in May and eight in June. Actual deliveries to the Army again differed: five (series numbers 2054–2058) on 27 March; eight (N° 2059-2062 and 2065–2068) on 22 April; ten (N° 2069–2078) on 6 May; twelve (N° 2079–2090) on 25 May and finally two (N° 2063 en 2064) on 6 June. Of the remainder of thirteen vehicles (N° 2091–2103) it is unknown whether they were ever handed to the forces: they were sent south when the Renault factory had to be evacuated on 12 June.

The second production series featured several improvements. The most important of these was the fitting of the APX 4 turret, equipped with the longer SA 35 gun, which had a far better antitank-capacity, with about twice the original armour penetration, mainly due to a longer cartridge. Due to the longer rounds the ammunition load decreased to 108 rounds. The new turret also had PPLR X 160 episcopes instead of Chrétien diascopes and was fitted with a S 190 G attachment point on the roof above the back hatch, to use the reserve machine gun as an AA-weapon. Analogous to the Char B1 bis designation for the similarly improved second Char B1 version, some internal unit documents in 1940 began to refer to the second series as the "Char D2 bis", but this was never an official name.

Other changes included: an improved greasing system; reinforced ball bearings for the road wheels; a different form for the idler and sprocket to reduce the chance that tracks would be thrown; shorter mudguards; a thinner antenna; a new Vertex distributor and a Vlet starter engine using compressed air to reduce the demand on the battery.

== Rebuilding the first production batch ==
Rebuilding the original production series as flamethrowers was considered, and a single prototype had already been created of this modification; on 27 September 1939 a first batch of fifteen had been ordered and on 23 April 1940 it was decided to modify all vehicles. Nevertheless, there was a parallel plan, irreconcilable with the flame thrower project, to up-arm them all. In September 1939 two of the five vehicles used at the central driver school (ECC) were experimentally fitted with the longer gun, leaving three tanks to be employed for training. In the winter of 1940 it became apparent that France would have for the immediate future a lack of really powerfully armed tanks; at that moment the organic strength of SOMUA S35 or Char B1 units was just about three hundred. Adding 49 vehicles — the flamethrower prototype could not be easily turned into a standard tank again — would thus represent a not inconsiderable reinforcement of the battle tank fleet. It was accordingly decided to modify the existing APX 1 turrets of the vehicles into the APX 1A version, a process that had already taken place to bring the original 34 Char B1 tanks up to Char B1 bis standard. The APX 1A retained the original protruding diascopes.

From 9 March the turrets of the older vehicles were sent to the Atelier de Rueil in batches of fifteen, themselves divided into three smaller groups of five, so as to be rebuilt; at the same time it was planned to give the hulls a complete factory overhaul; due to a lack of spare parts this revision was delayed and less thorough than originally intended. Turrets and hulls were thus separated, making it difficult to put the tanks together again in an emergency situation. The first five vehicles left on 11 March, taken from the 2nd Company of 19e BCC. Part of the first main batch were also a command tank and a replacement vehicle. On 12 April the second batch of fifteen was sent. Remarkably, this process did not lead to an official cancellation of the flamethrower project which — be it only on paper — proceeded.

== Operational history ==
=== Elite troops under de Gaulle ===
In April 1937 the elite 507e RCC (Régiment de Chars de Combat) based at Metz was the first unit to receive the Char D2. After sufficient crews had been trained three tank companies were raised, which on 14 July of the same year participated in the Bastille Day parade, which was always used to publicly present new types. Some exemplars were adorned in the most complex factory camouflage scheme, using eight different hues outlined in black, among which such surprising colours as deep purple, lilac and sky blue. On 1 October 1937 the 1st Battalion of the regiment (1/507) was established as a Char D2 unit with an allotment of 45 tanks: each company had four sections of three tanks and two command vehicles; three were part of the central battalion reserve. The five remaining tanks were used in the central driver school. From 5 September Charles de Gaulle commanded the unit, with the rank of lieutenant-colonel until 25 December 1937, when he was promoted full colonel. De Gaulle, France's foremost armour specialist of the day, used the type to test his ideas about tank tactics, especially in the field of radio communication. Though a clear improvement over the Char D1, the new matériel had its shortcomings. It was unreliable — engine, transmission, steering and cooling were too weak — and quickly wore out, demanding a large maintenance effort. This implied that the readiness was low for a type representing in the summer of 1937 the majority of 47 mm gun tanks in France, the Char D1 having been phased out to be sent to the colonies, the Char B1 bis being built at a rate of three per month and the SOMUA S35 even yet having to enter mass production.

On 26 June 1938 the tanks were individually named after great French military victories during a special ceremony, being baptised with bottles of champagne. De Gaulle would use the Austerlitz, Rocroi and finally the Yorktown as his personal tank during parades, having a cushion fixed on the turret hatch he had to sit on, to accentuate his already great physical height; his legs were so long he had to let them rest on the shoulders of the driver.

=== Phoney War ===
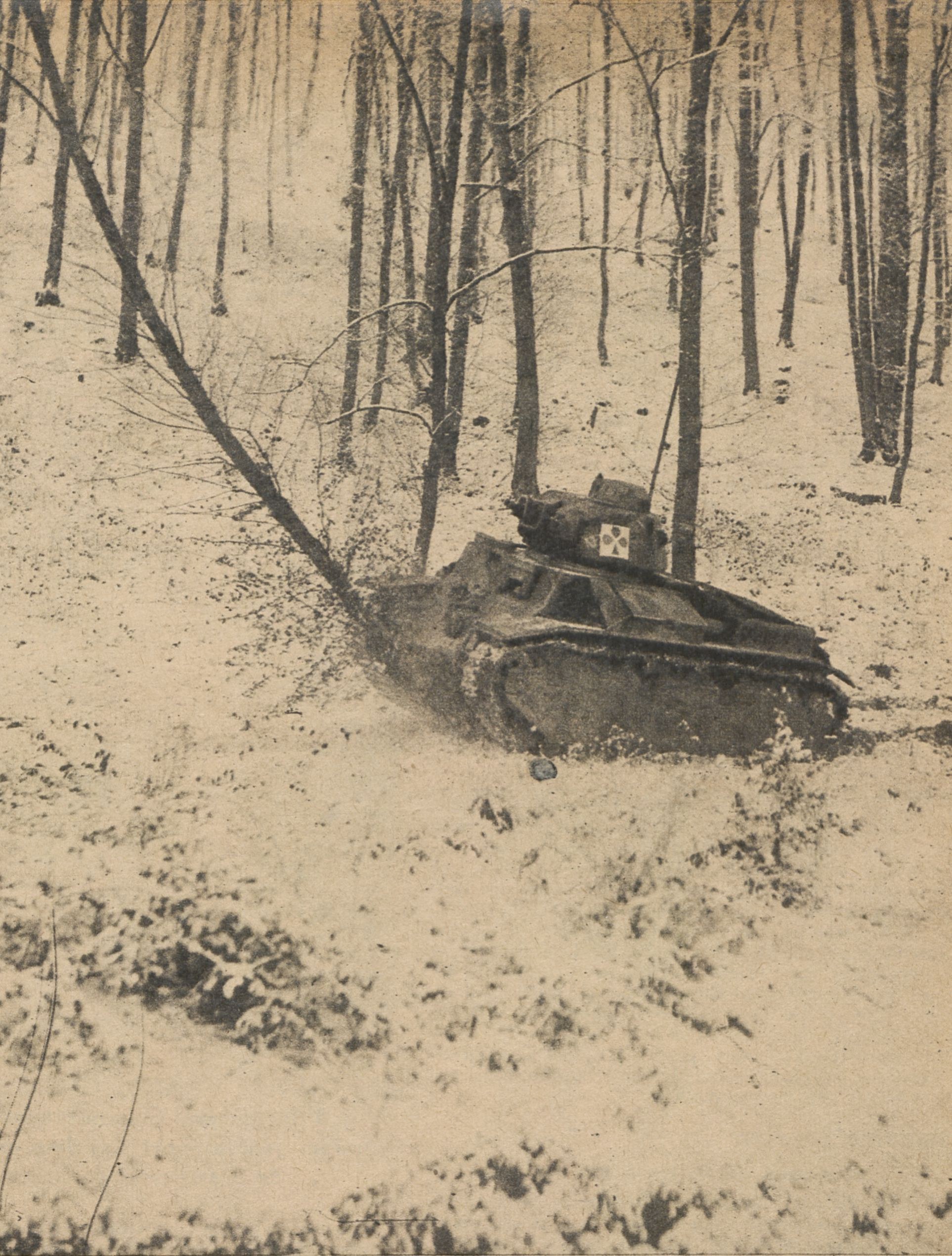
French D2 tank in January 1940

When war threatened, France mobilised. According to the mobilisation plans the tank regiments were to be split up and their battalions rearranged into autonomous tank brigades, the Groupements de Bataillons de Chars, that would serve as an armour reserve at army (group) level. Accordingly, on 27 August 1939 1/507 was renamed the 19e Bataillon de Chars de Combat under Commandant Ayme, and made part of the 507e Groupement de Bataillons de Chars, itself assigned to the armour reserve of Second Army Group. Mobilisation of both echelons (A and B) of the battalion was completed on 1 September and the next day de Gaulle resigned his command to become commander of the armour reserve of Fifth Army. After the outbreak of war — France became a belligerent on 3 September — a number of quick reorganisations took place: on 6 September the battalion was reassigned to GBC 510, on 8 September to GBC 511 and finally from 13 September participated in the Saar Offensive as part of GBC 517, the reserve of the Fifth Army. Moving on their tracks 120 kilometres to the frontline, thirty of the forty deployed tanks broke down: the vibrations caused by driving on a metalled road ruined the suspension systems. The unit was kept in reserve to repulse a possible counterattack by German armour, that never materialised.

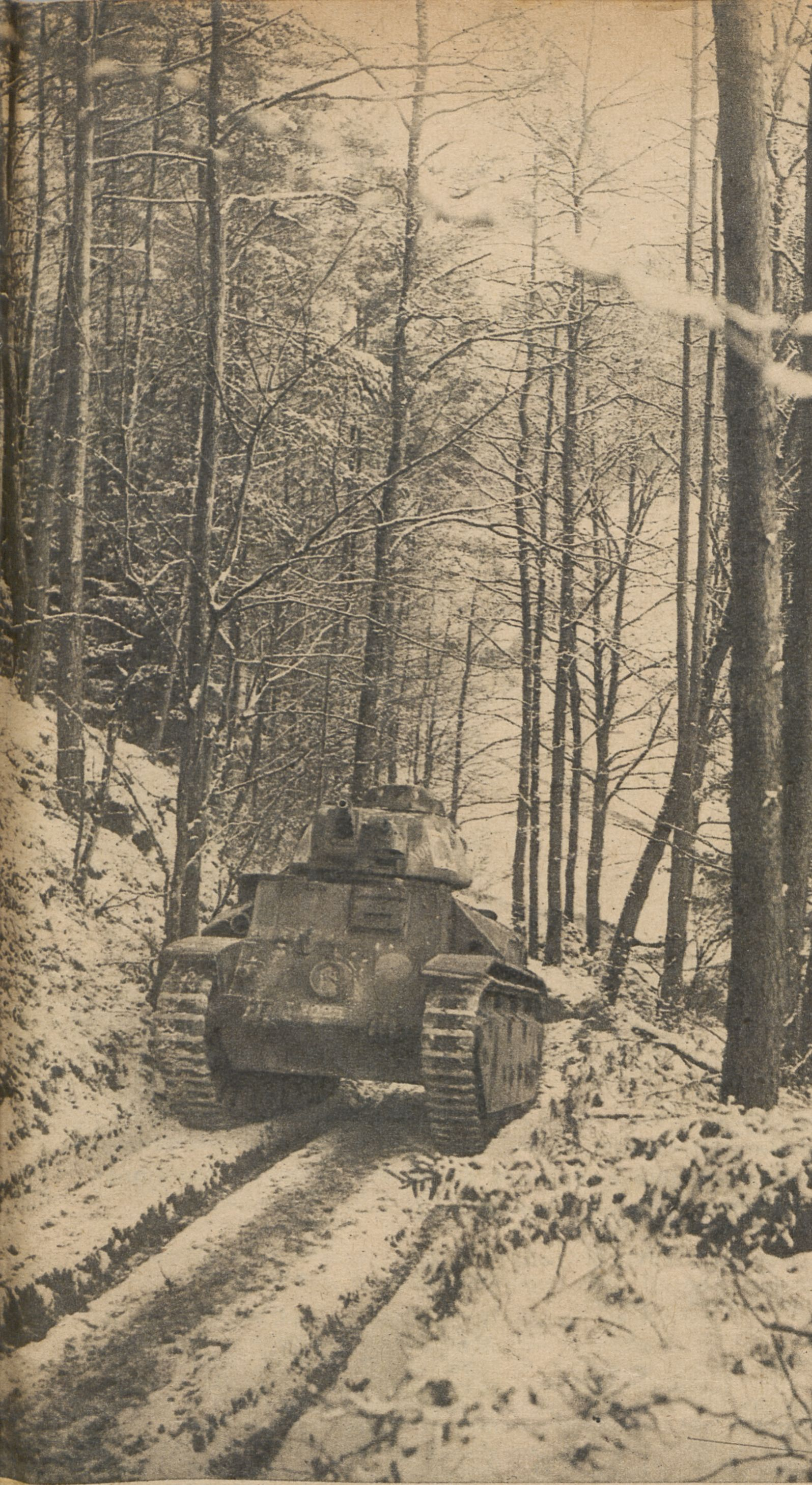
A D2 tank in the snow, January 1940.

During the severe winter of 1940, the battalion remained in battle positions. It soon became clear that the type was ill-suited to conditions of snow and ice: the track profiles were too flat and many vehicles were involved in serious accidents, slipping into a ravine.

Due to their increased use, including in training exercises, the Char D2s were largely worn out by this time. The battalion eagerly awaited the replacement of their 44 old vehicles by the second production series. The decision in March to upgrade the existing tanks came as a severe disappointment as it implied that the number of operational vehicles would at first decline even further as they were gradually removed from the battalion strength to be rebuilt. On 26 April the situation deteriorated even further when the order came to split off one of the companies. On 7 May it would be turned into an autonomous tank company, the 345e CACC (Compagnie Autonome de Chars de Combat) under command of Captain Jean-Charles Idée, to be part of the CEFS (Corps Expeditionnaire Français de Scandinavie), the French Expeditionary Corps of Scandinavia, that had been built up during the winter to assist Finland against the USSR in the Winter War. Finland already having been defeated, it was now redirected to assist Norway against the German invasion during Operation Weserübung. By drawing lots it was decided that the First Company (1/19 BCC) would be sent. The company would be equipped with fourteen tanks of the second production series, leaving its old tanks behind. This seemed to imply that the new vehicles would never be destined for 19e BCC, not even in a later phase. On 29 April the company received its replacement tanks, but these transpired to be, though brand-new, in a very poor mechanical condition and broke down almost immediately. The causes were never investigated; conforming to the pervading Fifth Column atmosphere of the day, the malfunctioning was not attributed to the structurally deficient quality control at Renault combined with a hasty acceptance procedure, but to sabotage. The plan to send the company to Norway was soon cancelled as the reports of the previous winter clearly showed that the Char D2 was unsuited to snow conditions.

=== Battle of France ===
Due to the events mentioned above, 19e BCC, a few years earlier still an elite armour unit and one of the most modern of France, had at the time of the German invasion of 10 May 1940 been reduced to a rather ineffective force. Its first company had been reassigned and even the latter's old vehicles were non-operational because the cannon-machinegun connector boxes of their sights had to be removed to be fitted to the new tanks as these had been delivered without any. Of the tanks of the other two companies, 21 had been rebuilt with the longer gun, fifteen of 2nd Company and six of 3rd Company, but only five of these had been given a complete overhaul and could be considered truly battle-ready. The remaining nine tanks of 3rd Company were in the process of being rebuilt and without turret. Nor was there any direct prospect of receiving newer vehicles, as it had been decided to raise another two autonomous companies with these: 346e and 350e Compagnie Autonome de Chars de Combat with ten and twelve vehicles respectively. This decision proved to be ill-founded however: in the end the situation forced a reunion of all Char D2 units into one battalion.

On 15 May the Germans achieved a decisive breakthrough near Sedan; the French command reacted to the crisis by ordering all available surplus armour matériel reserves to be organised into ad hoc-units, in order to engage the advancing enemy forces. Both 19e BCC and 345e CACC were that day assigned to a newly to be raised armoured division, the 4e Division Cuirassée (4 DCR), that was to be commanded by Charles de Gaulle. However, neither of these units at first was able to operate in a coherent whole with other divisional subunits: 345e CACC between 17 and 20 May fought independently, attacking towards Montcornet on the flank of the German penetration, destroying several enemy columns swerving too much to the south; 19e BCC was in no condition to fight and kept away from the frontline, not participating in the counterattacks of 17 and 19 May by 4 DCR near Laon.

On 17 May 346e CACC was raised with ten new tanks and crews taken from the 106e Bataillon de Chars, a training unit instructing in the use of the Char B1 bis. The men received a crash course how to operate the other tank type but it was soon perceived that they could not possibly acquire the necessary skills in the limited time available, so the company was in fact put to the disposal of 19e BCC, that kept the new crews in reserve and used their new tanks as replacements for broken down older vehicles.

After already having been officially placed under its command on 18 May, on 21 May 345e CACC was actually reunited with 19e BCC as its 1st Company, to boost the number of operational tanks of the battalion; other measures taken to that effect included putting turrets on four vehicles of 3rd Company and fitting new sight connector boxes to some of the old vehicles of 1st Company; two of the latter's old tanks were cannibalised to provide spare parts. By these measures the battalion was able to commit itself to battle; it fought for the first time near Amiens on 24 May and was able to field a peak strength of 24 vehicles the next day.

Soon readiness again declined; on 27 May, the day of the large counterattack by 4 DCR to reduce the Somme bridgehead of Amiens, the battalion could only bring into the field seventeen tanks and failed miserably: the intended accompanying French infantry fled in panic when the tanks completed their approach march behind them, mistaking the rare type for German armour. When the Char D2s advanced to the German positions disregarding the lack of infantry support, seven vehicles were disabled by German antitank-guns.

To bring the battalion up to strength again to function as an armour reserve during the expected main German operation against France as a whole, Fall Rot, on 2 June the 346e CACC was made an organic company of 19e BCC, but using thirteen older vehicles and (also poorly trained) reserve crews, assigned on 14 May to replace 1st Company, from the battalion. On 8 June 350ème CACC was formed with twelve new vehicles; it was joined to 19e BCC on 19 June. On that day this battalion was already in a dismal state, having had to cover the retreat of 4 DCR during the collapse of the French front. The large distances covered and the lack of time to carry out maintenance led to a quick reduction of the number of operational tanks. On 23 June, two days before the armistice, having again become separated from 350e CACC, the battalion was turned into a Bataillon de Chasseurs portés, a motorised infantry battalion, having lost all tanks.

Of the 84 tanks known to be delivered to army units, 21 were destroyed or disabled by enemy action. Seven, all belonging to 350e CACC, were on 25 June still operational. Of the remainder 38 were abandoned after a breakdown, twelve were sent to a depot, three had never been in action having been in reserve in the 507e RCC depot at Vannes, of two the condition is unknown, and one fell into a ravine.

The Germans captured at least 21 Char D2s: nine that were turned in by the French and twelve that had been abandoned but not destroyed by their crews. They gave the type the administrative designation Panzerkampfwagen 733 (f) but, although some German units had temporarily taken Char D2s into service immediately after capture, apparently never officially assigned it to any unit. Some turrets were fitted to an armoured train operating in the Balkans. Of the tanks not surrendered, the exact fate is unknown but at least one, possibly the exemplar that had fallen into a ravine, was later in the war used for clandestine research by Vichy armour engineers of the Service du Camouflage du Matériel (CDM).

== Projects ==
Apart from the two slightly different versions of the Char D2, and its Char D3 sister project, which resulted in just a single prototype, there were two important technological projects related to the type.

The first was the design of a flamethrower tank. This was not originally motivated by a desire to acquire a weapon able to destroy enemy pillboxes, the normal function of such systems, but inspired by the experience gained during the Spanish Civil War that tanks were quite vulnerable to attacks by portable flamethrowers. From this, it was deduced that an entire flamethrower tank, supporting an entrenched position strengthened by anti-tank obstacles, should present a most formidable defensive arm against enemy armour.

From 1938, the state Atelier de Rueil, in cooperation with the Chaubeyre factory, constructed a single prototype from one of the original series of fifty, that was finished on 5 December 1939. From the vehicle, the turret had been removed and in the fighting compartment a large fuel reservoir was built with a capacity of two thousand litres. This protruded slightly above the hull roof, and containing a mixture of benzol and light oil. Beneath it a fuel pump was installed, able to pump 1800 litres per minute through a nozzle fitted in the front of the hull. The range was about fifty metres. During tests, the results were quite impressive and on 28 March 1940 fifty conversion sets were ordered. These were to be of a different model with a smaller nine hundred-litre fuel reservoir and using the original turret to place the nozzle in. On 23 April, the order was given to rebuild all fifty vehicles of the first series, in batches of fifteen, but in fact these were, as said, already being rebuilt in an up-arming programme.

The second programme was that of a trench-crossing tail. In the First World War such tails, fitted to the back of a tank, had shown themselves quite useful for overcoming trenches and anti-tank ditches. The climbing tail was somewhat of a French speciality, mostly neglected by other nations — and indeed from the early thirties by the French too, as they were considered rather old-fashioned, a remnant of outmoded trench warfare. However, when war threatened it was realised that, outmoded or not, ditches would pose a serious obstacle to the French infantry tanks, especially to the shorter types, and existing prescripts about fitting them had better be followed.

On 25 August 1939, the Atelier de Rueil presented to the Commission de Vincennes an advanced prototype of a tail destined for the Char D2, fitted with a towing hook and inbuilt jack. On 2 September the tail was attached by means of rivets and tested from 11 September. Within three days the tail was sent back, however: it had been forgotten that due to its novel construction the Char D2 possessed no real girders at the back to secure the rivets; when they had to carry the entire weight of the tank, the rivets tore themselves from the armour plate. A second type, weighing 210 kilogrammes, and now securing via an intermediary welded plate and bolts, was ready on 5 February and approved for production; the French defeat prevented any being fitted to the tanks.

There are no surviving Char D2 vehicles.

== See also ==
- Tanks in France
