= Tanks of Sweden =

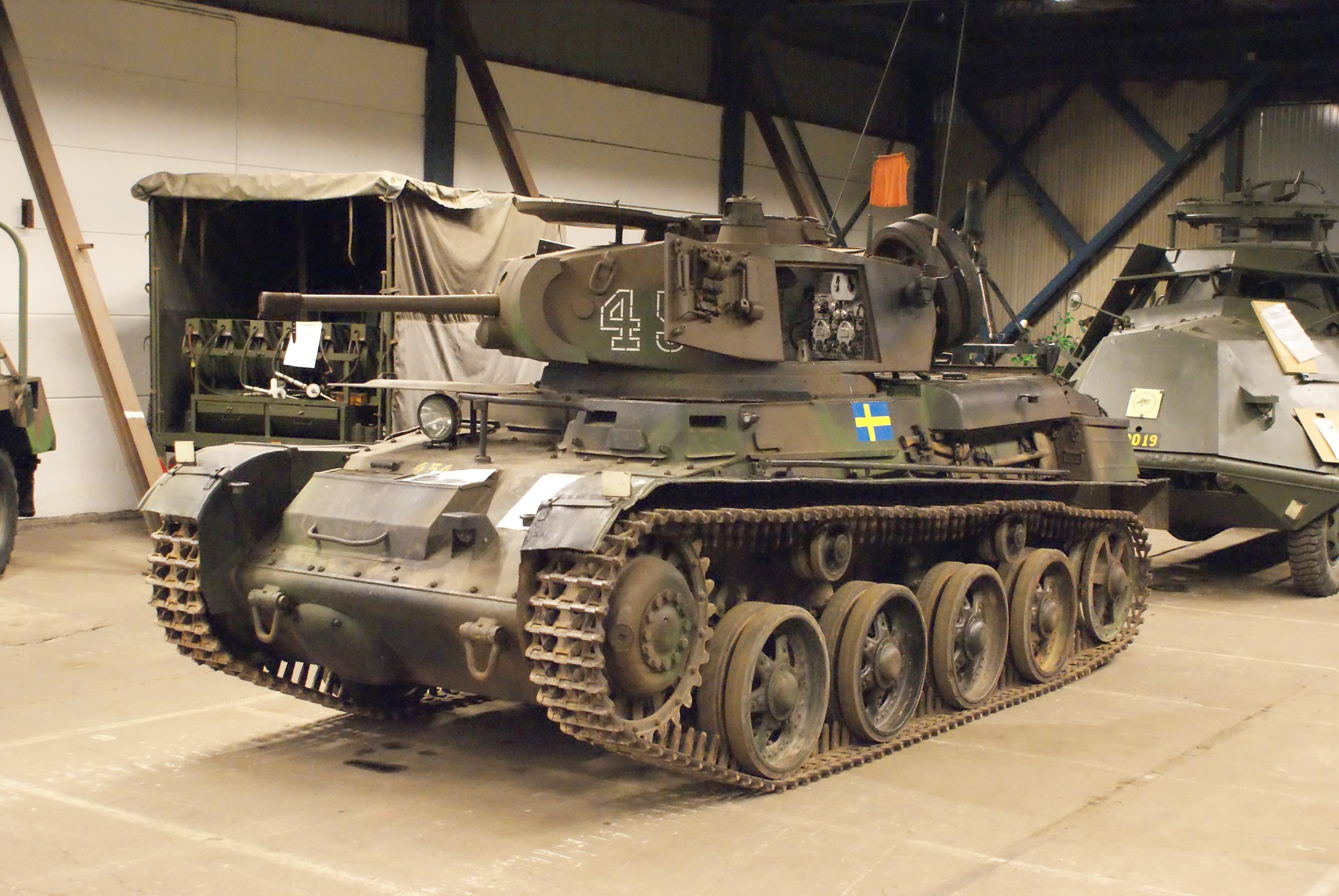
Swedish Landsverk L-60 World War II tank.

This article deals with the history and development of tanks employed by the military of Sweden, from the interwar period, and World War II, the Cold War and modern era.

== History ==
Following World War I, the Swedish government purchased parts for the German tank prototype LK II and then assembled in Sweden as the Stridsvagn m/21 (Strv m/21), which was essentially an improved version of the LK II prototype. Ten of these tanks were built, their armament a single 6.5 mm (0.26 in) machine gun.

In 1929, five were rebuilt to create the Strv m/21-29 variant which was armed with a 37mm gun or two machine guns and was powered by a Scania-Vabis engine. The Stridsvagn m/31 (Landsverk L-10) tank was the next design and built by AB Landsverk. It was armed with a 37 mm Bofors gun and a light machine gun, and was equipped with 8–24 mm armor. Only three were built and, despite being highly advanced for the time when World War II broke out, they were dug in as static bunkers.

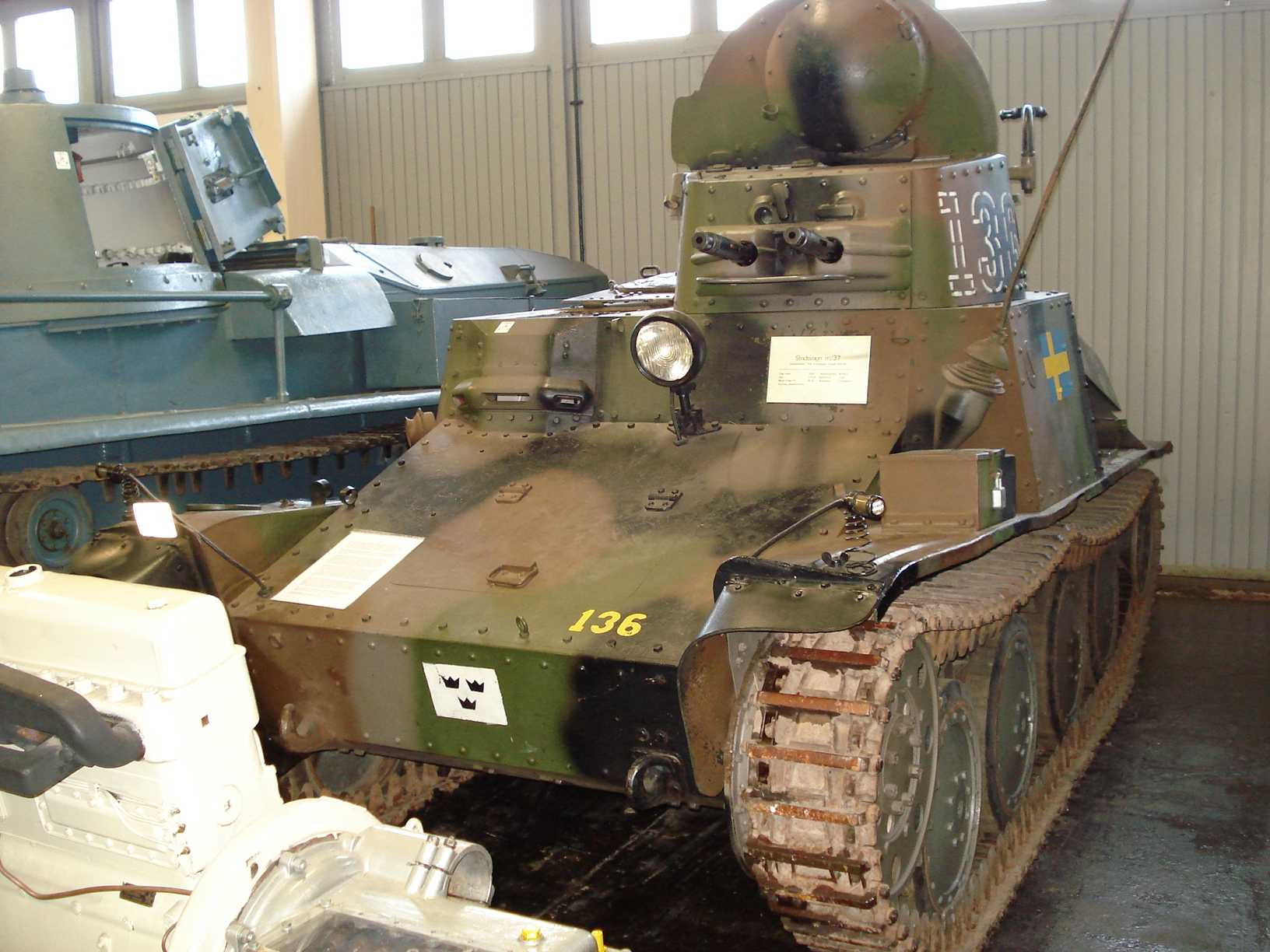
Stridsvagn m/37 on display at Swedish Army Museum in Stockholm, Sweden.

Sweden ordered forty-eight tankettes in 1937 as the Stridsvagn m/37 (Strv m/37) after a successful demonstration during winter conditions in the Krkonoše Mountains. They were to be assembled in Oskarshamn with a more powerful 4.39 litres (268 cu in), water-cooled, six-cylinder, 85 horsepower (63 kW) Volvo FC-CKD gasoline engine and armor, up to 15 millimetres (0.59 in) thick, from Avesta, although ČKD supplied most of the other components after building one prototype. The vehicle was heavily modified with the driver's machine gun deleted and proved to be the heaviest and largest version of the AH-IV at 4.68 tonnes (4.61 long tons; 5.16 short tons) and a length of 3.4 metres (11 ft), a width of 1.85 metres (6.1 ft) and 1.96 metres (6.4 ft) high. Its turret mounted two Swedish 8 mm (0.31 in) Ksp m/36 strv machine guns and sported a small observation cupola on its top. It carried a radio and 3960 rounds for its machine guns. It had a maximum speed of 60 kilometres per hour (37 mph) and a range of 200 kilometres (120 mi). It could ford a stream up to .9 metres (3.0 ft) in depth. The last components were shipped in November 1938.

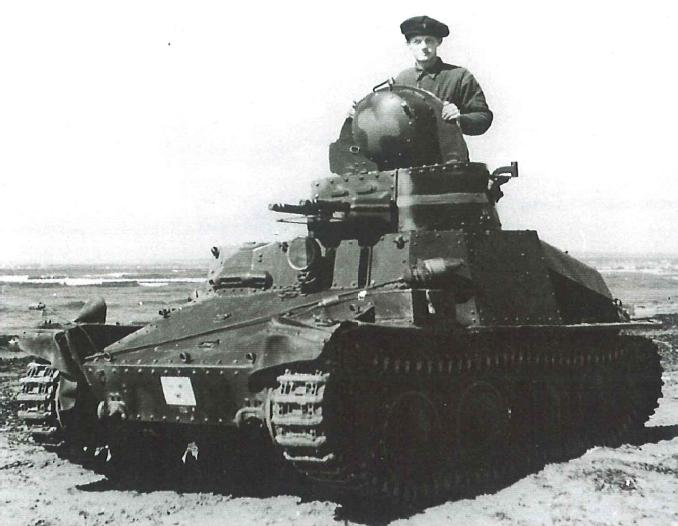
The Swedish model of the AH-IV, the Strv m/37

On 1 September 1939, at the outbreak of war, Sweden relied on a numerous army through conscription and the use of a Total Defence policy. Throughout World War II, Sweden held the largest infantry army of the Nordic countries with more than 1,000,000 soldiers.

When the war broke out in 1939, Sweden had one armoured division consisting of merely 13 light tanks, only 3 of which were considered to be modern (the remaining 10 had been in service since the 1920s).

During the war, Sweden had the Stridsvagn m/41 which was a license-built version of the Czechoslovak TNH medium tank, and also the Landsverk L-60 light tank. The L-60 was adopted by the Swedish army in 4 main variants: Stridsvagn m/38, Stridsvagn m/39, Stridsvagn m/40L and Stridsvagn m/40K. The most significant Swedish tank development during the war was the Stridsvagn m/42 (Strv m/42) a medium tank it fielded with a 75 mm L/34 gun, the first of its size in a Swedish tank. It entered service with the Swedish army in November 1941. Modern in design, it was also well protected and mobile. A total of 282 were produced.

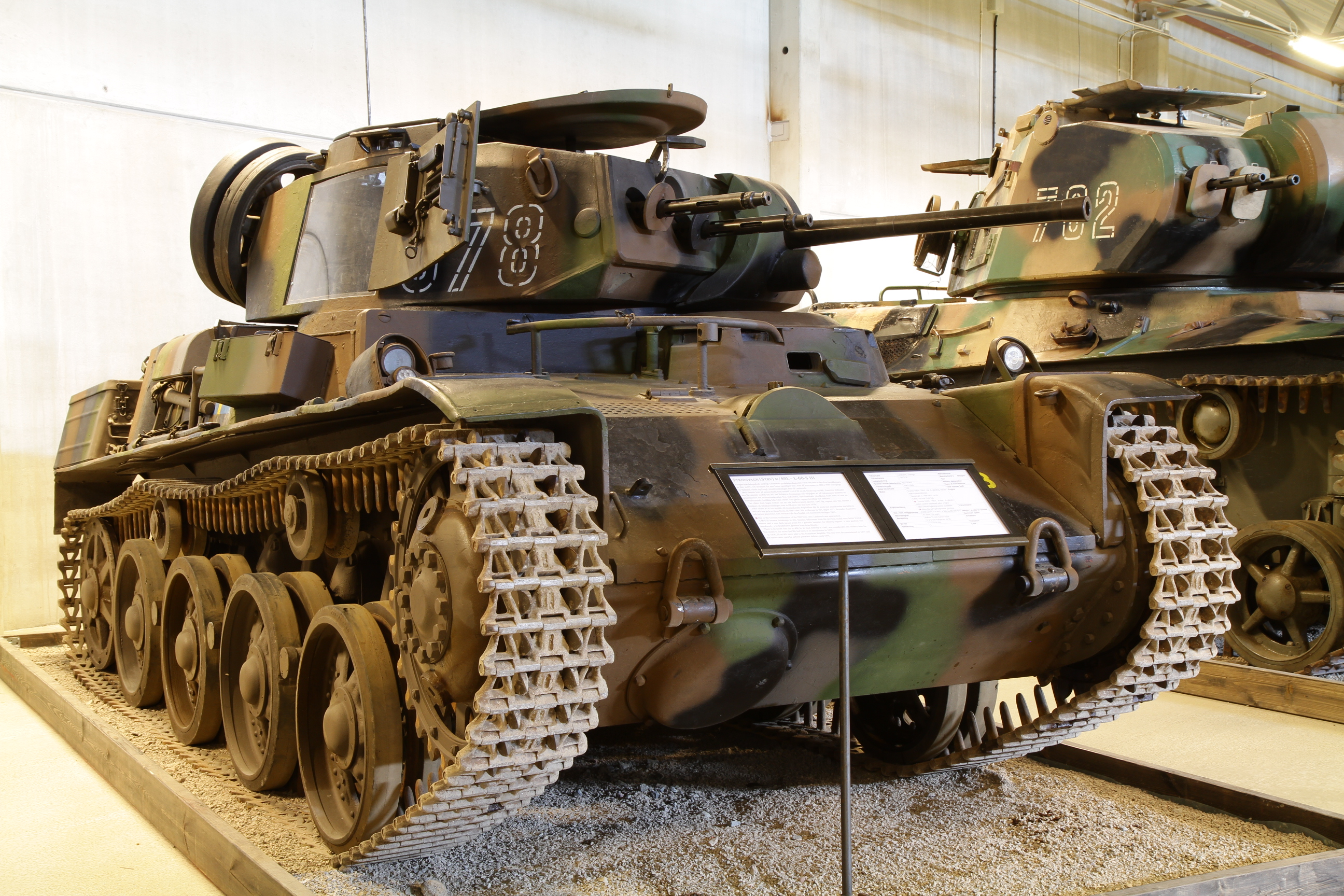
Stridsvagn m40K tank

In 1945, the number of tanks serving the Swedish army had increased from 13 to more than 800. As a neutral nation in World War II, Sweden did not engage in combat; thus its tanks have no battlefield record.

The Stridsvagn 74 was a tank in use with the Swedish Army from 1958 to 1984. It was a modification of the older Stridsvagn m/42, which was phased out of service in the early 1950s. Instead of scrapping the vehicles altogether, the chassis were used to build a new tank which could be used as a supplement to the newly bought stridsvagn 81. The turret of the strv 74 was completely new, with a 75 mm high-velocity gun based on an old anti-aircraft gun, engines and transmission were modified or changed from the strv m/42, broader tracks and a separate electrical engine for the turret rotation was introduced while retaining the manual control as a backup.

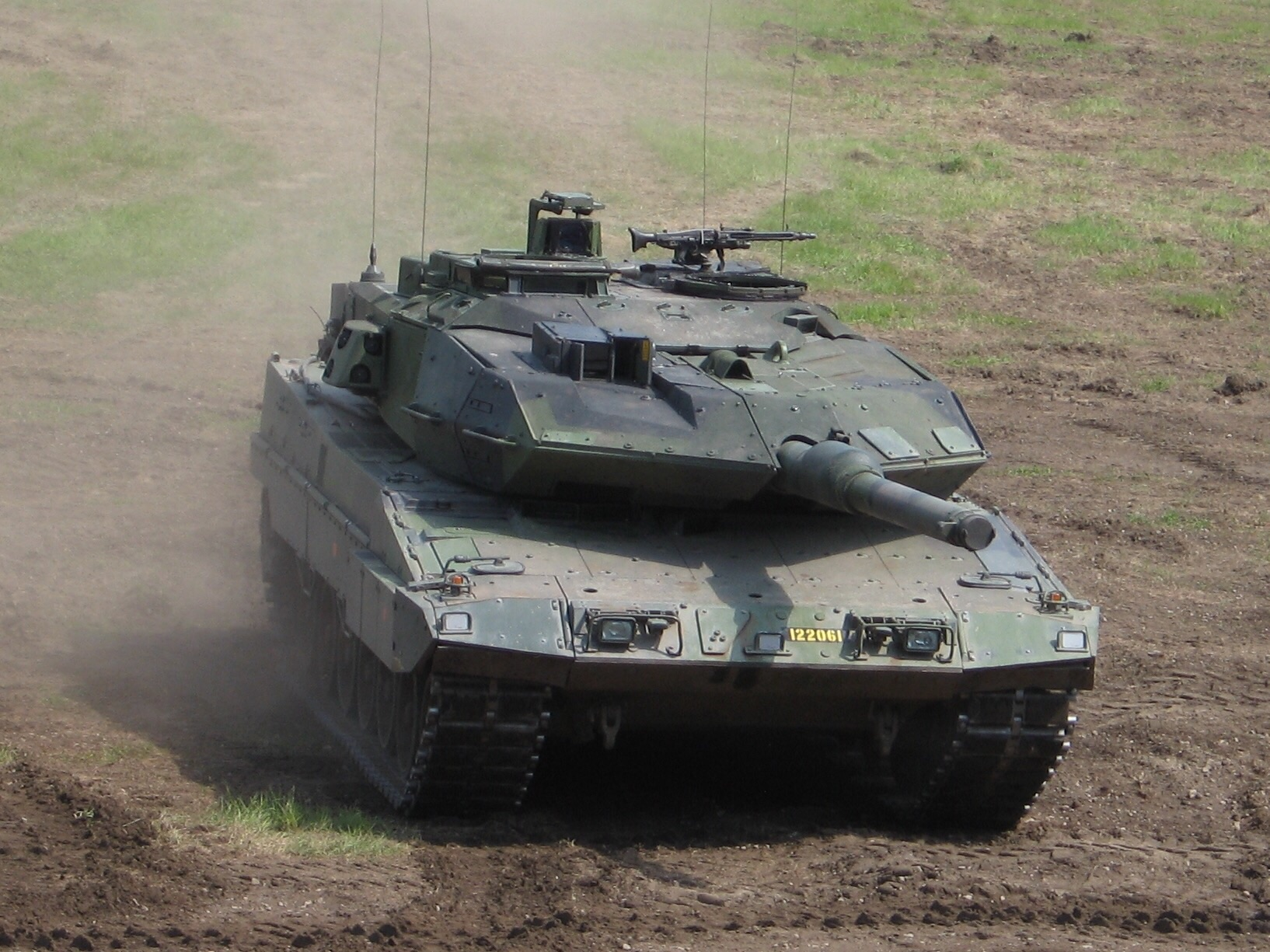
Stridsvagn 122 of the Swedish army

The Stridsvagn 103 is a Swedish post-World War II main battle tank. It is known for its unconventional design: it is turretless with a fixed gun traversed by engaging the tracks and elevated by adjusting the hull suspension. While turretless armoured fighting vehicles are usually classified as assault guns or tank destroyers, despite its unique gun laying process the Strv 103 is considered a tank because its designated combat role matched those of other tanks within contemporary Swedish doctrine. It is the only mass-produced tank since World War II to dispense with a turret.

The Strv 103 was designed and manufactured in Sweden. It was developed in the 1950s and was the first main battle tank to use a turbine engine. The result was a very low-profile design with an emphasis on survivability and heightened crew protection level. Strv 103s formed a major portion of the Swedish armoured forces from the 1960s to the 1990s, when, along with the Centurions, it was replaced by the Stridsvagn 121 and the Stridsvagn 122, variants of the Leopard 2.

== List of Swedish tanks ==
Vehicle	Origin	Type	Versions	In service	Notes
Strv m/21-29	Germany/Sweden	Light tank	Strv 21	1922-1938	
Landsverk L-10	Sweden	Light tank	Strv L10	1935-1939	
Landsverk L-60	Sweden	Light tank	Strv L-60	1939–1960	
Stridsvagn m/41	Sweden	Medium tank	Strv m/41	1942-1957	
Stridsvagn m/42	Sweden	Medium tank	Strv m/42	1943-1960	
Stridsvagn 74	Sweden	Light tank	Stridsvagn 74	1958-1984	
Stridsvagn 103	Sweden	Main Battle tank	Stridsvagn 103	1967-1997	
Strv 121	Germany/Sweden	Main battle tank	Strv 121	1985-2002	Used for recovery training
Strv 122	Germany/Sweden	Main battle tank Armoured recovery vehicle Combat engineering vehicle	Strv 122 A/B Bgbv 120 Pionierpanzer 3 Kodiak	120 1997-present	

== See also ==
- History of the tank
- Tanks in World War II
- Tank classification
- List of military vehicles
- Military equipment of Sweden during World War II
- Military equipment of Sweden during the Cold War

== Sources and further reading ==
- Home page of the Swedish Armed Forces
- http://www.soldf.com/
- See article links for further information on specific equipment
