= Renault FT Kégresse =

- FT Kégresse 28 March 1928
- Type: Light tank
- Place of origin: France

Service history
- In service: 1928–WW2
- Used by: France; Poland; Yugoslavia
- Wars: Rif War; World War II

Production history
- Designer: Louis Renault; Adolphe Kégresse
- Designed: 1923–1925
- Manufacturer: Renault
- Developed from: Renault FT
- Developed into: Renault NC
- Produced: 1925–1929?
- No. built: 26–29
- Variants: Machine gun variant Cannon armed variant

Specifications
- Mass: ca 8.5 tonnes (8.4 long tons; 9.4 short tons)
- Crew: 2 (commander, driver)
- Armor: 8 to 22 mm (0.31 to 0.87 in)
- Main armament: 1 × machine gun or 37 mm Puteaux SA 18
- Engine: Renault engine 40 hp
- Transmission: Renault transmission
- Suspension: vertical springs
- Maximum speed: 17 km/h (11 mph)
- Steering system: Steering levers

The Renault FT Kégresse or FT Citroën-Kégresse (French: Tank Renault avec système Citroën-Kégresse, "Renault FT tank with Citrëen-Kégresse system") is a French light tank developed by Louis Renault and Adolphe Kégresse in the 1920s as a rebuild for existing Renault FTs, but which was only produced in limited numbers for the export market. The rebuild fitted such with a new suspension and Kégresse tracks made of rubber. An analog product was the Renault NC which used steel tracks, reinfored armor and a stronger engine.

Twenty-six tanks were modified for the French Army, and nine vehicles were later sold to Yugoslavia and five to Poland, along some Renault NC.

== Development ==
After World War I, France possessed a very large fleet of Renault FT light infantry support tanks. Although many of these were sold to other nations, over 2800 remained. In contrast to the United Kingdom, which greatly reduced its armoured forces and scrapped redundant AFVs after the war, France maintained a large number of active or reserve armoured units (with an organic tank strength of about 1260) and all of the remaining Renault FTs were kept in working order. This implied that in the early twenties France had the strongest and most modern armoured force in the world, but this very fact led to a state of complacency. Development of new tank models was not seen as urgent, and budgetary restraints would for the immediate future prohibit any further tank production. When in 1922 General Jean Baptiste Eugène Estienne concluded an official study containing guidelines for long term tank design, no provisions were made for any new light infantry tank.

The remaining Renault FT vehicles, though having shown themselves to be very effective in trench warfare, were not well adapted in their present state of technological development to peacetime conditions. The main problem was their low top speed, which necessitated special tank transporters whenever the vehicles had to be moved outside their base area and made them fundamentally unsuited to patrolling duty in the colonies. It was therefore decided to modify a number of existing vehicles, by fitting them with a more effective suspension system.

One such system was the Kégresse track, which had been developed for half-tracks by Adolphe Kégresse in Russia between 1906 and 1917, and later in France under Citroën during WW1, which he now envisioned for modernized Renault FT tanks. A patent using leaf spring suspension had been filed on November 23, 1922, and a Renault FT Kégresse mockup with trench crossing rollers stood ready on May 25, 1923.

Adolphe Kégresse tracked suspension patent, filed November 23, 1922

FT Kégresse mockup with rollers, July 25, 1923

Adolphe Kégresse next to the FT Kégresse mockup

An analog project was the Renault NC-1, launched in 1923, which featured a coil spring suspension with steel track, reinforced armor and a stronger 62 hp engine. An alternative variant was the NC-2, which featured the rubber tracked suspension by Kégresse. One NC-2 prototype was built and finished in december 1925, but after testing it was discontinued in favour of the NC-1 model.

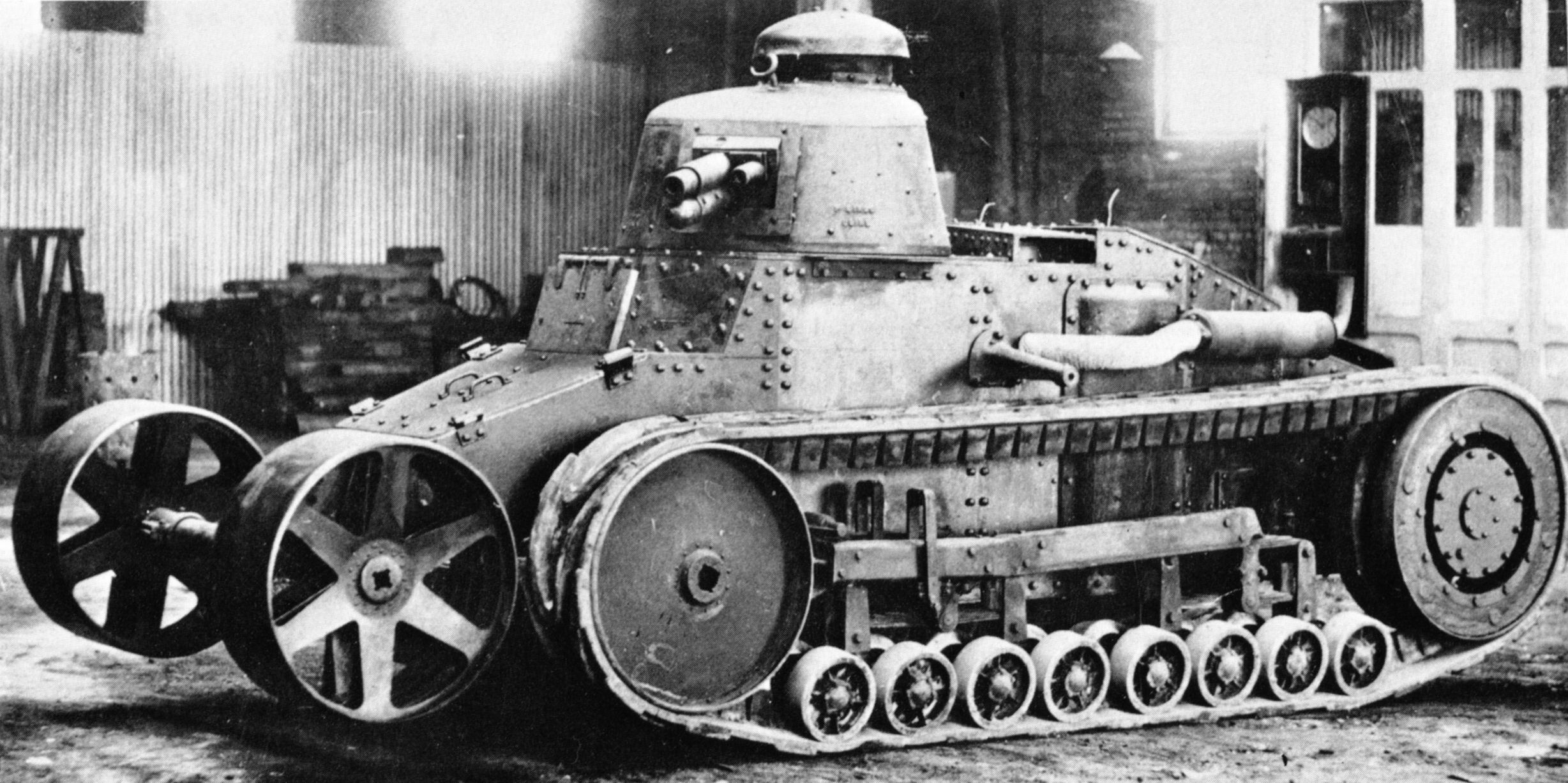
Renault NC-2 prototype in 1926

NC-2 suspension close-up

== Service ==
=== France ===
In 1925, 26 French FT tanks were rebuilt with rubber Kégresse tracks and upgraded with detachable rollers on the front and rear for trench crossing. The modification allowed for a top speed of 17 km/h but field experience showed that the track was liable to suddenly snapping at top speed with often catastrophic consequences and the modification project was therefore discontinued. These were deployed in 1926 during the Rif War Berber insurrection in Morocco, where it was found that it took too long to replace tracks when they came off so did not stay in service for long.

Modified tanks continued to be used by the French 508e BCC, their tracks improved by rubber-metallic grousers.

French FT Kégresse in Morocco

French FT Kégresse in Morocco with obstacle crossing rollers

=== Poland ===
The first buyer of the FT Kégresse tanks was Poland, which ordered five tanks in 1928, along with one Renault NC-27.

The tanks were trialed along each other, but after lengthy trials, the Poles declined any further purchases. The Polish already had more than 150 Renault FT tanks, and the improvements offered by the NC and FT Kégresse were not sufficient to warrant a purchase.

Renault FT Kégresse in Poland

Renault NC-27 on trials in Poland

=== Yugoslavia ===
Yugoslavia bought nine FT Kégresse tanks at the end of the 1920s. These have rear rollers in photos.

The Yugo FT Kégresse tanks served until the spring of 1941, when the Germans invaded Yugoslavia. By that time they were obsolete. Some of them were knocked out and a few were captured intact. One of them eventually ended up in American hands and was sent to the Aberdeen Proving Grounds.

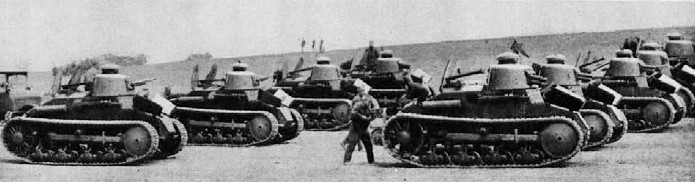
Yugoslavian FT Kégresse

Yugo FT Kégresse on parade. The rear rollers can be seen.

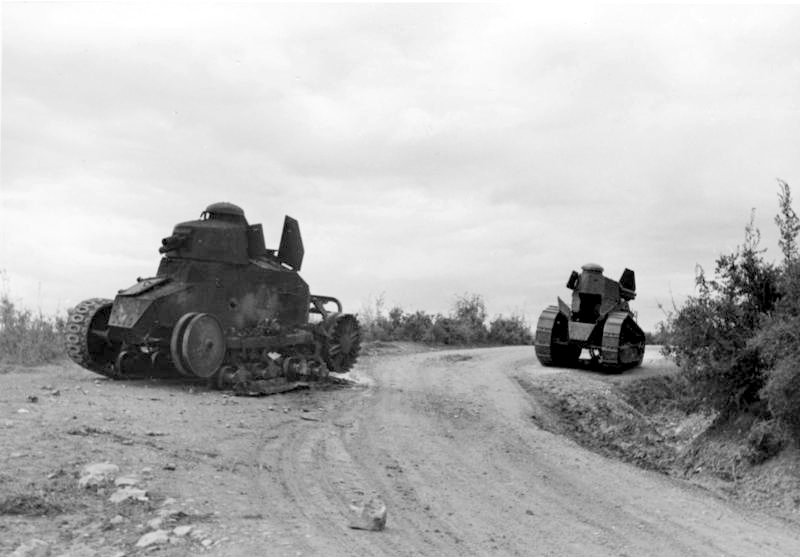
Yugo FT Kégresse knocked out

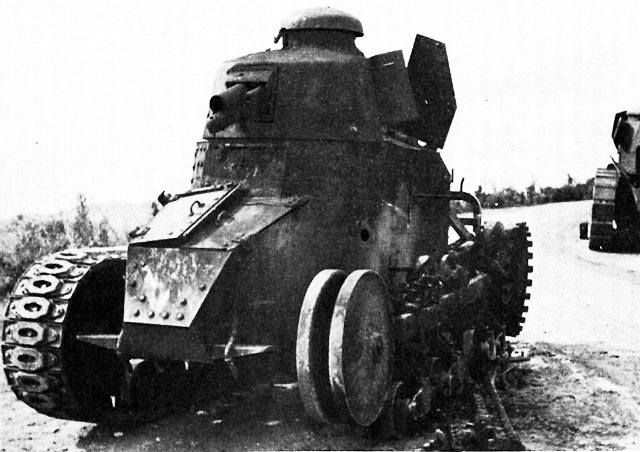
Front of destroyed Yugo FT Kégresse

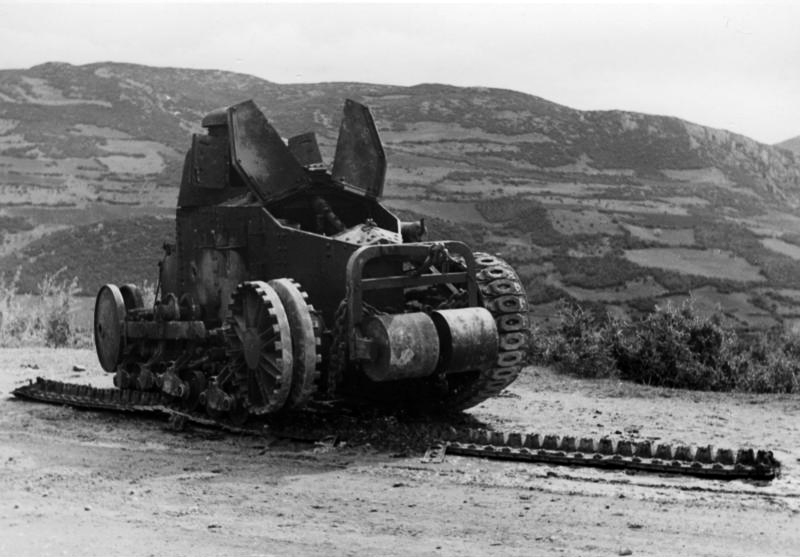
Back of destroyed Yugo FT Kégresse

== Users ==
- France – (1925–WW2) 26 vehicles
- Poland – (1928–WW2) 5 vehicles
- Yugoslavia – (1928–WW2) 9 vehicles
