= Japanese tanks of World War II =

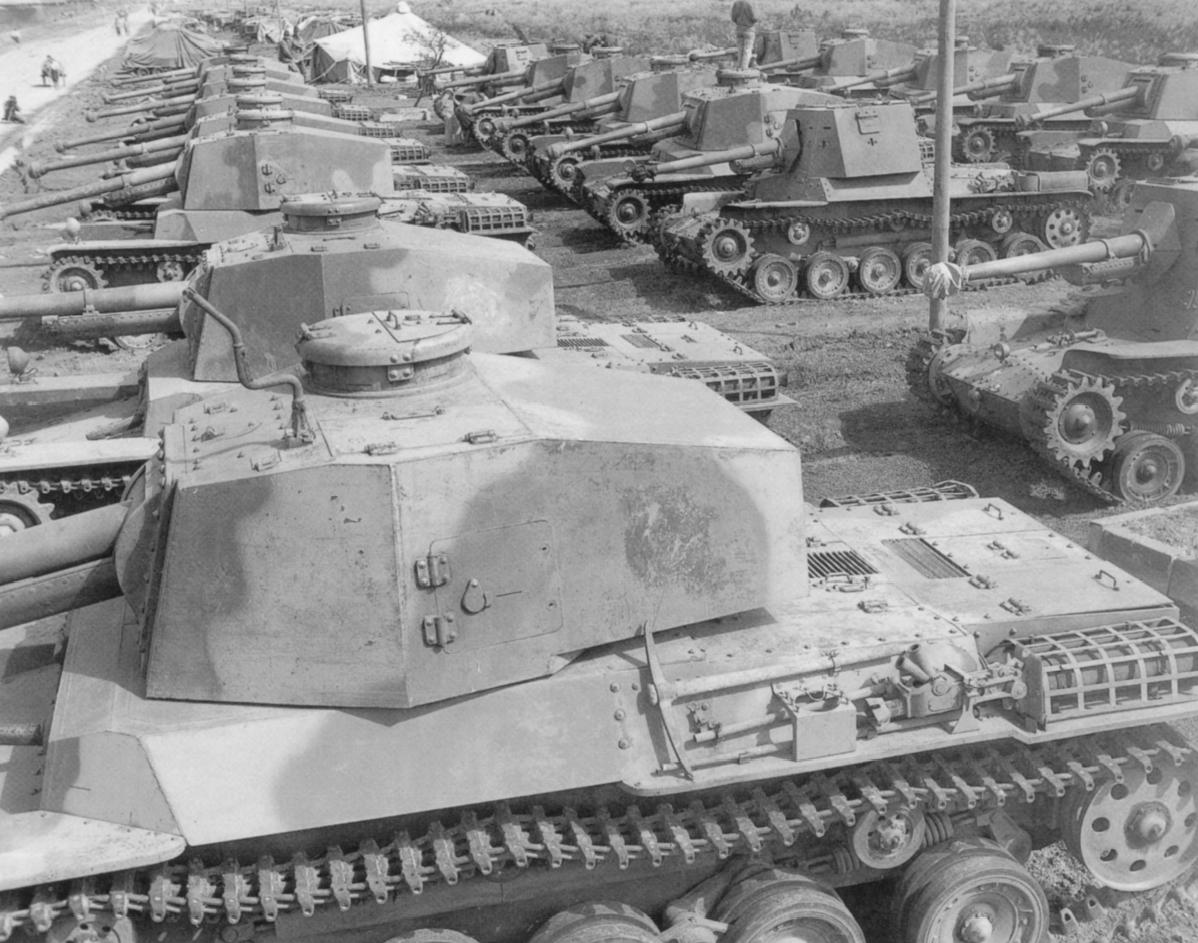
IJA 4th Armored Division with Type 3 Chi-Nu tanks and Type 3 Ho-Ni III self-propelled guns

The Imperial Japanese Army (IJA) initially purchased foreign tanks for evaluation during World War I, and began developing its own indigenous designs during the late 1920s.

Due to the war with China, Japan produced a large number of tanks. Although initially the Japanese used tanks to good effect in their campaigns, full-scale armored warfare did not occur in the Pacific and Southeast Asian theaters as it did in Europe, and tank development was neglected in favor of naval activities. Later, during the last year of World War II the newest and best Japanese designs were not used in combat; they were kept back in expectation of defending the Japanese Home Islands.

== Initial tank procurement ==
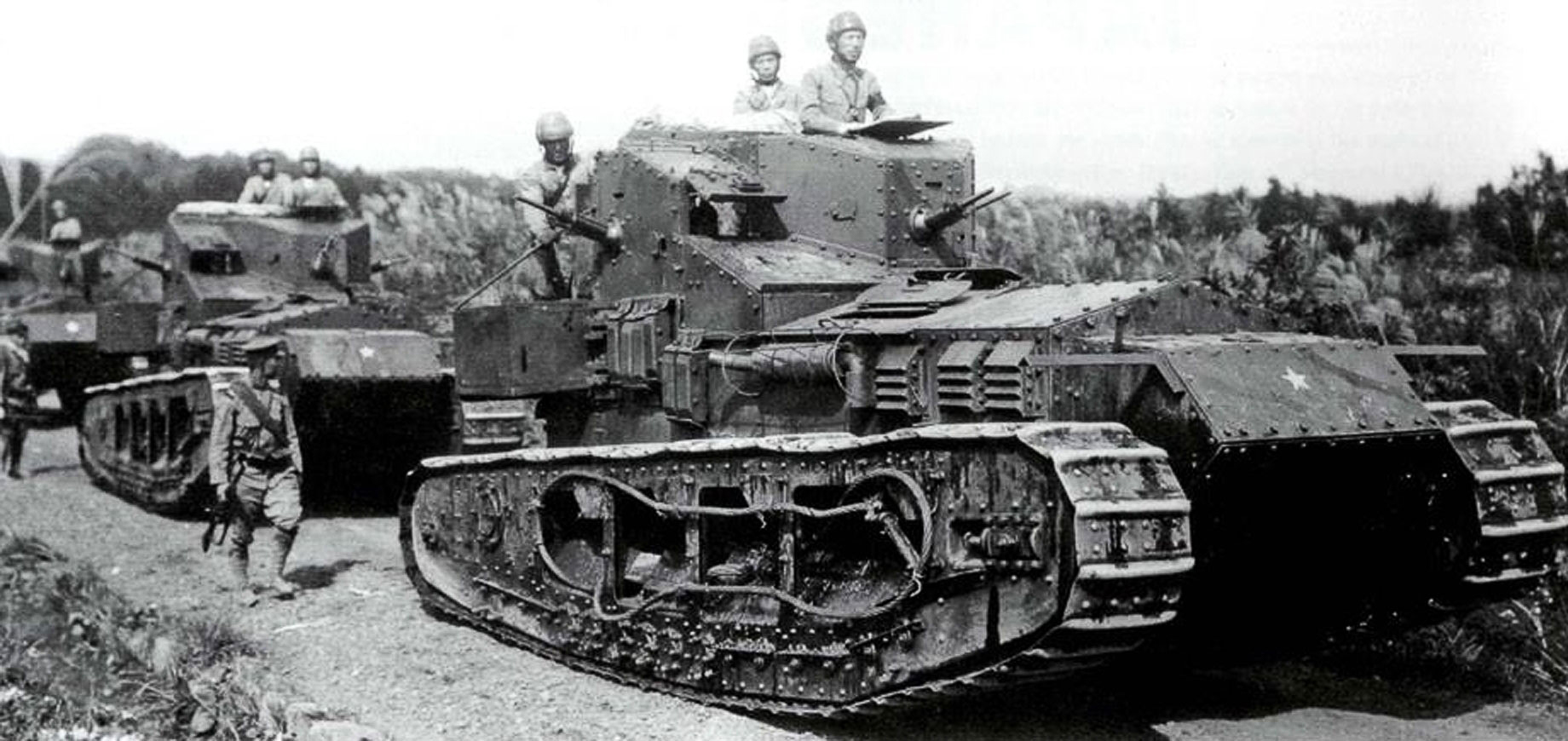
Japanese Whippets

Near the end of World War I, the Japanese showed an interest in armored warfare and tanks and obtained a variety of models from foreign sources. These models included one British Heavy Mk IV and six Medium Mark A Whippets, along with thirteen French Renault FTs (later designated Ko-Gata Sensha or "Type A Tank"). The Mk IV was purchased in October 1918 while the Whippets and Renaults were acquired in 1919.

Trials with these vehicles were successful, and the army decided to establish an armored force in 1925, planning to form three light tank battalions and one heavy tank battalion. However, the greatest problem was equipping these units, as the Japanese did not have any indigenous tank production capability at that time. The IJA therefore sent a mission to purchase more tanks from Britain and France, requesting newer designs. However, the newer tanks were not available as these countries had difficulties supplying them to their own armored forces, and the only available model was the older Renault FT. The Japanese reluctantly imported the Renault FT tanks. In March 1927, the IJA also bought a Vickers Medium C to use for design study. During trials, the gasoline engine of the Vickers C caught fire, leading the Japanese design team to call for a diesel engine for use in indigenous produced tanks. Then in 1930 they were able to acquire ten examples of its successor, the Renault NC1 (designated Otsu-Gata Sensha or "Type B Tank"). Both types of tanks were still in active service in 1940, and additional vehicles and spare parts were obtained after the Japanese occupation of French Indochina. The Japanese also purchased several Vickers 6-Ton tanks and Carden Loyd tankettes and used these as a basis for further development in tanks.

== Doctrine ==
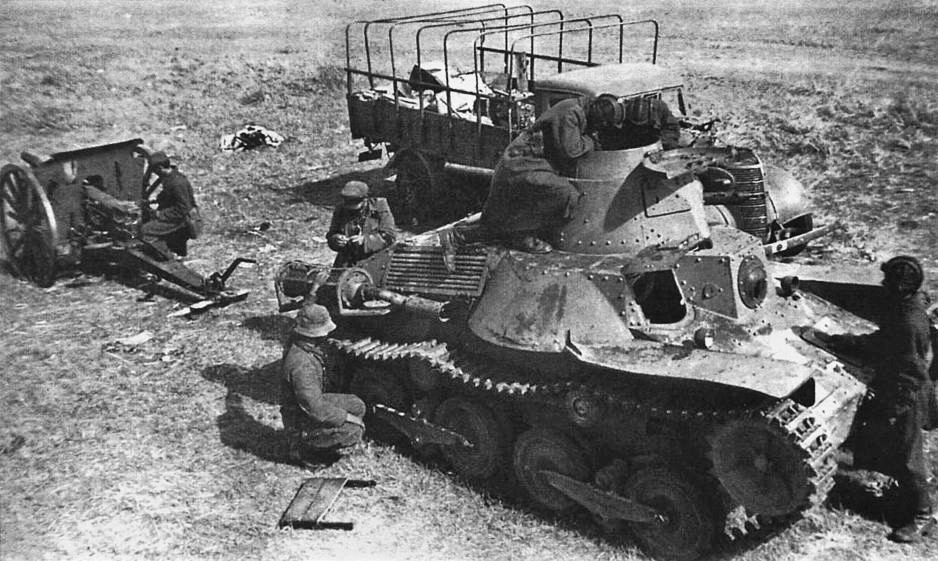
Japanese tank Type 95 Ha-Go captured by Soviet troops after battle of Khalkhin Gol

As with the Americans and the Italians, the Japanese originally adopted French-designed tanks, and were influenced by their doctrines and employment. As with many other nations at the time, the Japanese viewed the tank as a tool largely used in direct support of their infantry, and were rarely allowed independent action. During the Second Sino-Japanese War, Japanese tanks were successful, especially as the Chinese had no significant armoured forces of their own.

With their defeat by the Soviet Union at Nomonhan in 1939, the Japanese began to rethink their tank designs and doctrine, although their emphasis would continue to remain on supporting the infantry. However, with the beginning of the Pacific War, Japan's priorities shifted to warship and aircraft production, and resources for the production of armored vehicles for the Army were diverted or curtailed.

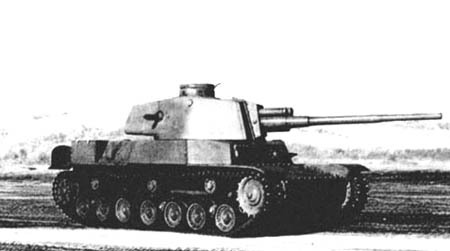
Side view of Type 4 Chi-To prototype, late in the war

In addition, the terrain of Southeast Asia and the islands of the Pacific were in general not suited to armored warfare, being largely tropical rainforests. Aside from the invasion of Malaya, and the Philippines, large-scale Japanese use of tanks was limited during the early years of the war and therefore development of newer designs were not given high priority as the Japanese strategy shifted to a "defensive orientation" after the 1941-42 victories.

Older tanks continued to be used as defensive emplacements and infantry support weapons. Advanced Japanese tank designs, which could challenge Allied tanks did not appear until the close of World War II; as with many innovative weapons projects launched by Japan in the final years of the war, production could not advance beyond either small numbers or the prototype stage due to material shortages, and the loss of Japan's industrial infrastructure by the Allied bombing of Japan.

== Naming system ==
Like all weapons, the year of introduction is the first criterion. A tank's designation contains the last two digits of the Japanese imperial year, which has its origin at 660 BC. For example, the designation "Type 89" corresponds to imperial year 2589, which is 1929 in the Gregorian calendar.

However, several weapons, including tanks, might be introduced in any given year. The Japanese used ideograms to differentiate further the various weapons. The first ideogram indicated the category of the vehicle. It was a katakana syllable that corresponded to the first syllable of the category. Thus, the katakana syllable ke (ケ) stood for a light tank, as it is the first syllable of the corresponding Japanese term, keisensha (軽戦車). Analogously, chi (チ) meant a medium tank, te-ke (テケ) a tankette, ho (ホ) a self-propelled gun, and ka (カ) an amphibious tank.

| Abbreviation | Long form | Meaning |
|---|---|---|
| chi (チ) | chūsensha (中戦車) | medium tank |
| ke (ケ) | keisensha (軽戦車) | light tank |
| ho (ホ) | hōsensha (砲戦車) | gun tank |
| ka (カ) | suiriku ryōyō sensha (水陸両用戦車) | amphibious tank |
| te-ke (テケ) = TK | tokushu ken'insha (特殊牽引車), see Type 94 tankette | tankette |
| o (オ) | ō (大, big) standing for chōjū sensha (超重戦車) | super-heavy tank |

There was a second ideogram to distinguish the models. This character is another katakana syllable that represents an ordering according to the Iroha sequence and can be thought of as a, b, c, … or first, second, third, and so on.

For example, the Type 97 Chi-Ha medium tank was introduced in 1937 and the third medium tank, the Type 2 Ke-To was a light tank introduced in 1942 and the seventh light tank. There is sometimes a surname to supplement or replace the ideograms. The Type 97 ShinHōtō Chi-Ha medium tank was a variation of the medium tank Chi-Ha with a new turret (新砲塔, shin hōtō). The Type 95 light tank had the surname ha-gō (ハ号, third model) that was given by its designer, Mitsubishi Heavy Industries.

== Japanese designs ==
For both security and logistical reasons, certain officers and engineers in the Japanese Army Technical Bureau during the early 1920s were adamant that future tanks should be made in Japan. General Suzuki (chief of the Technical Bureau) protested at the Ministry of War decision to purchase foreign designs, which ultimately led to that decision being reversed. A special committee of the Imperial General Staff (Daihonei) worked on the feasibility of indigenous design and development of Japanese armor.

However, indigenous design and production of armored vehicles would prove to be difficult, due to minimal experience with military motor vehicle design (the engineers had only designed several types of trucks and one type of tractor), along with low priority for tank steel production. Moreover, the first design had to be completed in only two years or the program would be canceled.

=== Type 87 Chi-I (Experimental tank No.1) ===
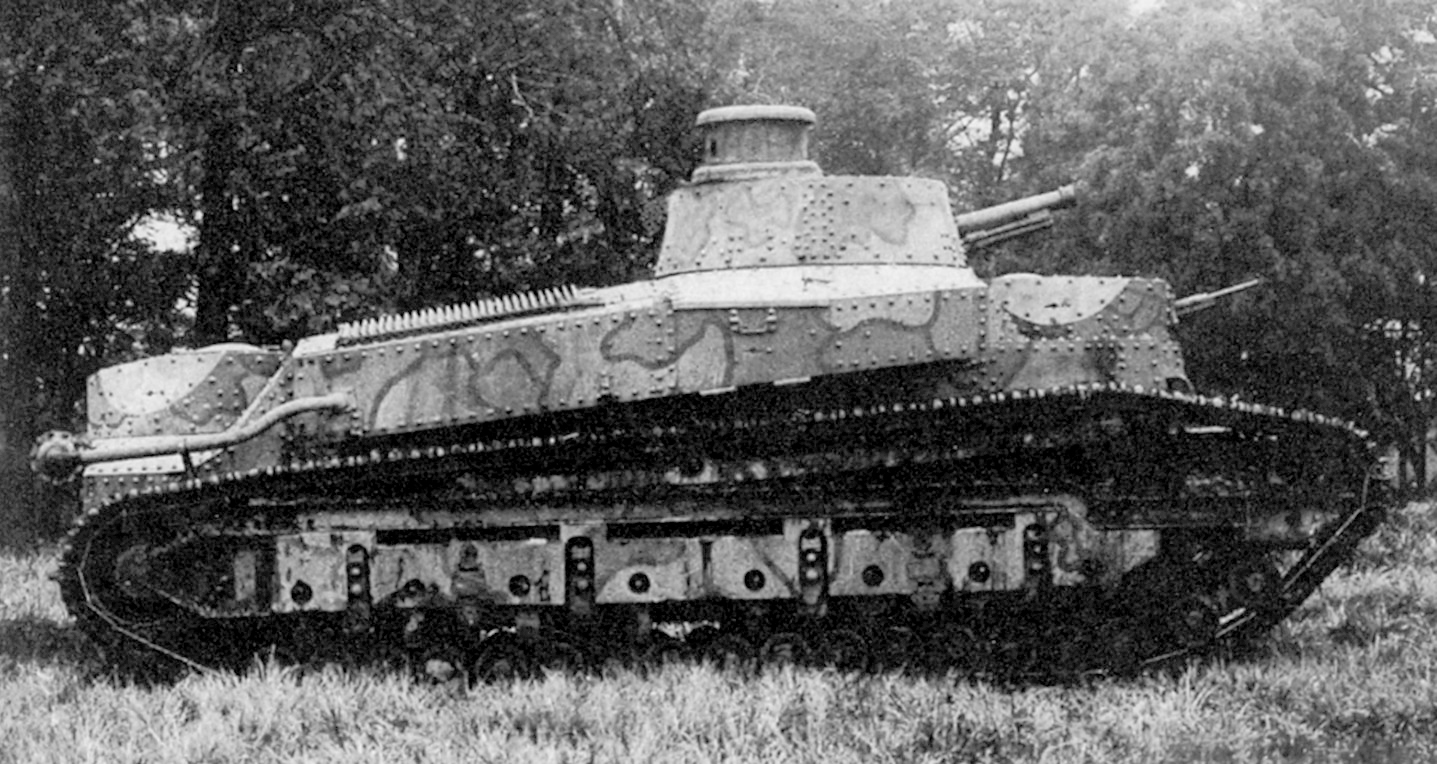
Experimental tank No.1(試製1号戦車), 1927 (Imperial year 2587)

Development of the first Japanese-designed tank began in June 1925. A team of engineers of the Technical Bureau participated in the development, including a young army officer, Major Tomio Hara. Hara later became the head of the tank development department and rose to the rank of general. According to Hara, the first tank on the agenda was to develop a medium main battle tank. The team started their design and worked hard to complete the project within the two years allocated. As this was the first tank designed in Japan, they had to begin with almost every component built from scratch.

The design was completed in May 1926 and production was ordered to begin at the Osaka Army Arsenal. At the time, there was little heavy industry allocated to the production of motor vehicles in Japan, so there were significant difficulties creating the prototype. Experimental tank No.1 a/k/a Type 87 Chi-I was completed by February 1927. The 20-ton tank underwent field trials, but proved to be under-powered. The weight of this initial prototype and its low speed did not impress the Imperial Japanese Army General Staff Office, so a new requirement was issued for a lighter tank, with a nominal 10-short-ton (9.1-metric-ton) weight. The new design was modeled after a Vickers Medium Mark C tank, which had been purchased by the Japanese Army in March 1927. Along with the Osaka Army Arsenal, Sagami Army Arsenal was also assigned to oversee the design and manufacture of assorted types of armored vehicles and tanks.

The tank had a complex parallelogram suspension system with two pairs of road bogie wheels per leaf spring arrangement. Hara designed a bell crank scissors suspension that paired the bogie wheels and connected them to a coil spring mounted horizontally outside the hull. This suspension became standard on the majority of the subsequently designed Japanese tanks and can be seen on the Type 95 Ha-Go light tank and Type 97 Chi-Ha medium tank, as examples.

=== Type 89 Chi-Ro medium tank ===
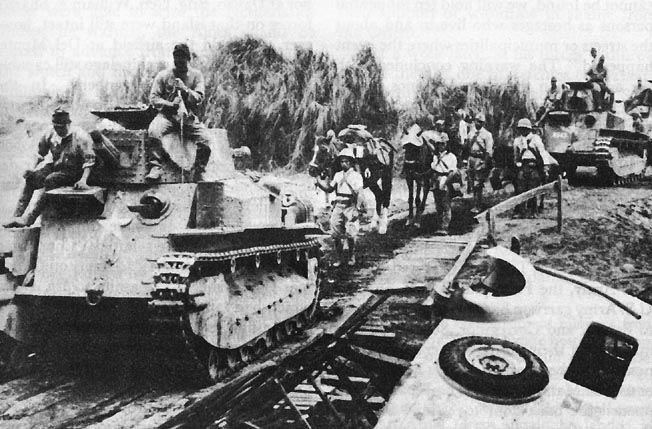
Type 89 Chi-Ro advancing towards Manila, Philippines, January 1942

The IJA decided that the Type 87 Chi-I was too heavy and slow to be used as its main tank, so the Type 89 Chi-Ro was developed to overcome these shortcomings. The new design weighed 12.7 tons and used stronger and lighter steel plate instead of the Type 87's iron armor. Armament was a Type 90 57 mm gun, along with two Type 91 6.5 mm machine guns. The Type 89 prototype was completed in 1929, with production starting in 1931, making this the first tank to be mass-produced in Japan. The designation is also known as the Type 89 "I-Go" and sometimes transliterated "Yi-Go".

The Type 89 had two variants - the Kō ("A"), which used a water-cooled gasoline engine, and the Otsu ("B"), with an air-cooled diesel engine and improved frontal armor. Of the two versions made, a total of 113 Kō tanks and 291 Otsu tanks were produced. The Type 89 served with Japanese infantry divisions and first saw combat use in China during the First Battle of Shanghai in 1932. It was deployed for operations in the Second Sino-Japanese War, beginning in 1937. However, by the late 1930s the Type 89 was shown to be fast becoming obsolete. The IJA therefore began a program to develop a replacement tank for infantry support and with the out-break of war with China, the peacetime budgetary limitations were removed. The Mitsubishi "Chi-Ha" model was thereby accepted as the new Type 97 medium tank by the army as the replacement for the Type 89.

=== Type 95 Ha-Go light tank ===
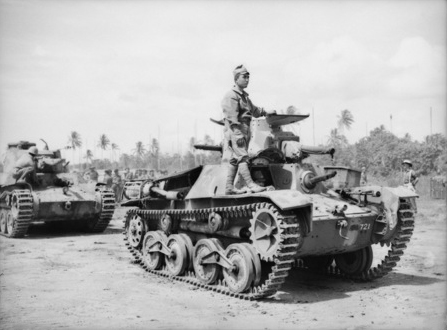
Type 95 Ha-Go in New Britain, following surrender in 1945

The Type 95 Ha-Go was a replacement for the Type 89 medium tank, which was considered too slow for mechanized warfare. The prototypes were built by Mitsubishi and production was started in 1936, with 2,300 completed by the end of the war. The initial version was armed with a Type 94 37 mm main gun and two Type 91 6.5 mm machine guns. From 1937 forward, it was armed with a longer barrel 37 mm main gun and two Type 97 7.7 mm (0.303 inch) machine guns, one in the rear section of the turret and the other hull-mounted. The changes in armament caused the weight of the tank to increase to 7.4 tons. The Type 95 Ha-Go had a crew of three.

Type 95 Ha-Go tanks served during the Battle of Khalkhin Gol (Nomonhan) against the Soviet Red Army in 1939, against the British Army in Burma and India, and throughout the Pacific Theater during World War II. On 22 December 1941 the Type 95 light tank earned the distinction of being the first tank to engage in tank vs tank combat with US manned American tanks (M3 Stuart light tanks in the Philippines) during World War II; and the only enemy tanks to have ever landed on North American soil during any war.

Several variants were built, among them: the prototype Type 3 Ke-Ri, which mounted the Type 97 57 mm tank gun; the Type 4 Ke-Nu, a conversion, re-fitted with the larger Type 97 Chi-Ha medium tank turret and its Type 97 57 mm tank gun; and the Type 5 Ho-Ru, a prototype casemate-hulled turretless self-propelled gun similar to the German Hetzer, but with a Type 1 47 mm tank gun.

=== Type 97 Chi-Ha medium tank ===
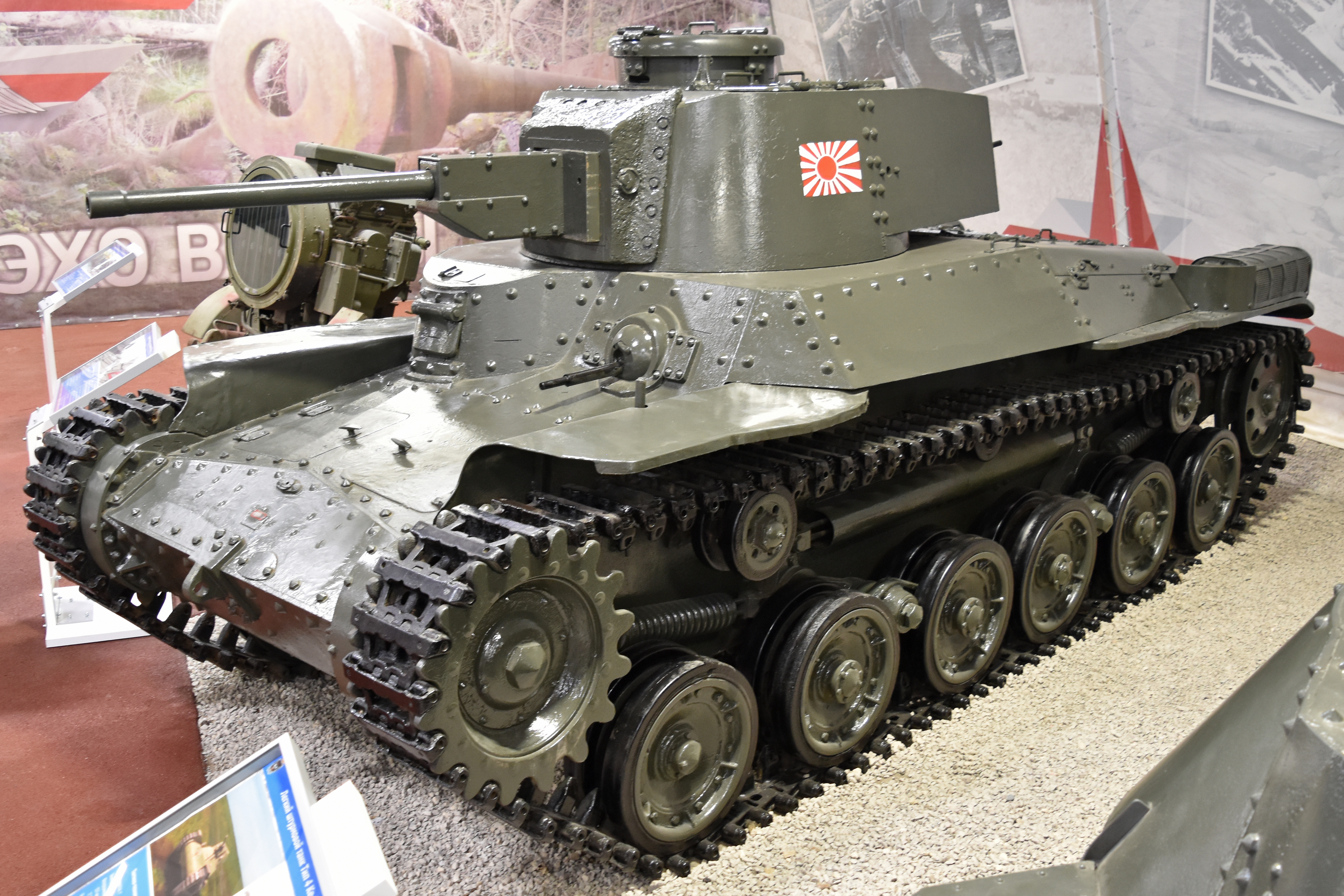
Type 97 Shinhoto Chi-Ha at Patriot Park, Kubinka

The Type 97 medium tank Chi-Ha (九七式中戦車 チハ, Kyunana-shiki chu-sensha chiha) was the most widely produced Japanese medium tank of World War II, with about 25 mm thick armor on its turret sides, and 30 mm on its gun shield, considered average protection in the 1930s. Some 3,000 units were produced by Mitsubishi, including several types of specialized tanks. Initial versions were armed with a low-velocity Type 97 57 mm tank gun that was designed to support the infantry, but its shortcomings became clear during the 1939 Battles of Khalkhin Gol against the Soviet Union. This convinced the army of the need for a more powerful gun. Development of a new 47 mm weapon was completed by 1941. The Type 1 47 mm tank gun was designed specifically to counter the Soviet tanks.

With the development of a new main tank gun came a revised version of the Type 97, designated Type 97 Shinhōtō Chi-Ha ("new turret" Chi-Ha) or Type 97-Kai ("improved"). It used the high-velocity Type 1 47 mm tank gun in its new, larger three-man turret. It replaced the original model in production in 1942. In addition, "about 300" of the Type 97 tanks with the older model turret and 57 mm main gun were converted.

Type 97 Shinhoto Chi-Ha tanks were first used in combat during the Battle of Corregidor Island of the Philippines in 1942. While it was vulnerable to opposing Allied tanks (US M3 Lee/British M3 Grant, M4 Medium and T-34), the 47 mm high-velocity gun did give the Shinhoto Chi-Ha a fighting chance against them and it is considered to be the best Japanese tank to have seen "combat service" in the Pacific War.

=== Type 98 Ke-Ni light tank ===
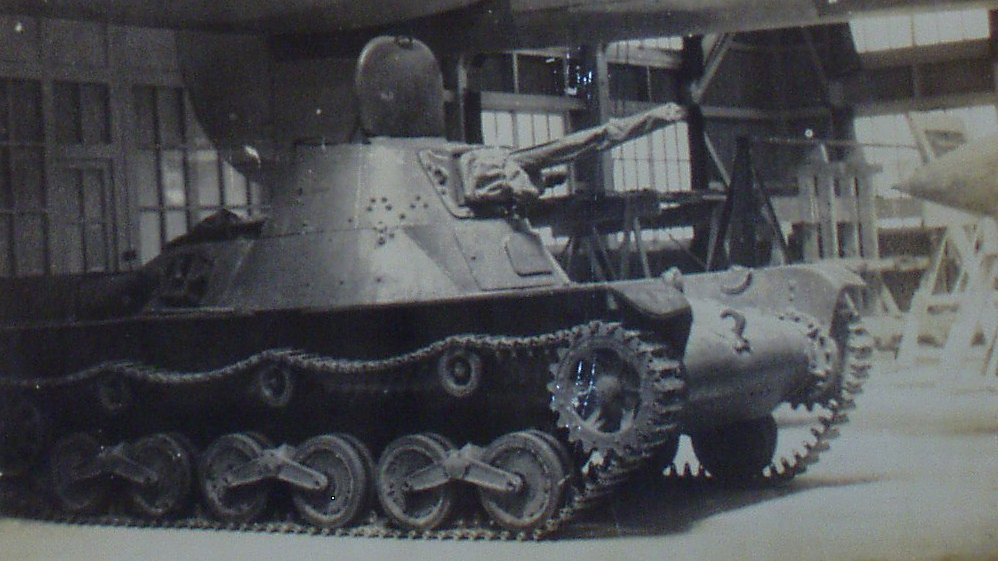
Type 98A Ke-Ni

The Type 98 light tank Ke-Ni (九八式軽戦車 ケニ, Kyuhachi-shiki keisensha Ke-Ni) was designed to replace the Type 95 Ha-Go light tank. It is also referred to as the Type 98 Chi-Ni light tank by some sources. It was developed in 1938 to address deficiencies in the Type 95 design already apparent from combat experience in Manchukuo and China in the Second Sino-Japanese War. The Imperial Japanese Army General Staff realized that the Type 95 was vulnerable to heavy machinegun fire–0.5 in (13 mm)–so it determined the development of a new light tank with the same weight as the Type 95, but with thicker armor was needed.

Even though the Hino Motors "Chi-Ni Model A" prototype was accepted after field trials as the new Type 98 light tank, series production did not begin until 1942. The Type 98 had a two-man turret, an improvement on the asymmetrical turret used on the Type 95, carrying a Type 100 37 mm tank gun, with a muzzle velocity of 760 m/s (2,500 ft/s) and a 7.7 mm machine-gun in a coaxial mount. A total of 104 Type 98s are known to have been built: 1 in 1941, 24 in 1942 and 79 in 1943.

One prototype variant was the Type 98 Ta-Se, an anti-aircraft tank that mounted a 20 mm AA gun. Another variant known as the Type 2 Ke-To light tank began production in 1944. It mounted an improved Type 1 37 mm tank gun in an enlarged turret, which gave the tank "slightly better performance". However, only 34 tanks were completed by the end of the war. No Type 2 Ke-To light tanks are known to have engaged in combat prior to Japan's surrender.

=== Type 1 Chi-He medium tank ===
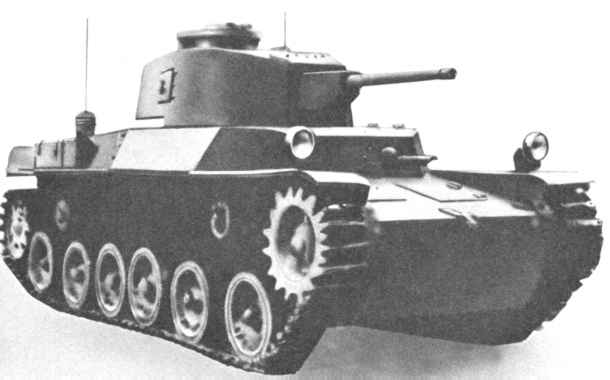
Type 1 Chi-He

The Type 1 Chi-He was developed in 1942 to replace the Type 97. The three-man turret and 47 mm gun of the Type 1 were retrofitted on the modified hull of the Type 97, which the factories were already producing. Its angled, thicker frontal armor was welded, as opposed to riveted. The Mitsubishi Type 100 diesel engine at 240 hp generated 70 horsepower more than the Mitsubishi Type 97 diesel engine, and was thus more than able to compensate for the additional weight in armor. The Type 1 Chi-He was the first Japanese tank to carry a radio as standard equipment in each tank, eliminating the need to use signal flags by the platoon commander. The newer tank proved to be superior to the Type 97 in design, speed and armor protection.

Even so, production did not begin until 1943, due to the higher priority of steel allocated to the Imperial Navy for warship construction. After less than one year, production was discontinued in favor of the Type 3 Chi-Nu medium tank, as the Type 1 Chi-He still would underperform against the American M4 Sherman. A total of 170 units were built from 1943 to 1944, but they did not see combat use as they were allocated to the defense of the Japanese home islands.

=== Type 3 Chi-Nu medium tank ===
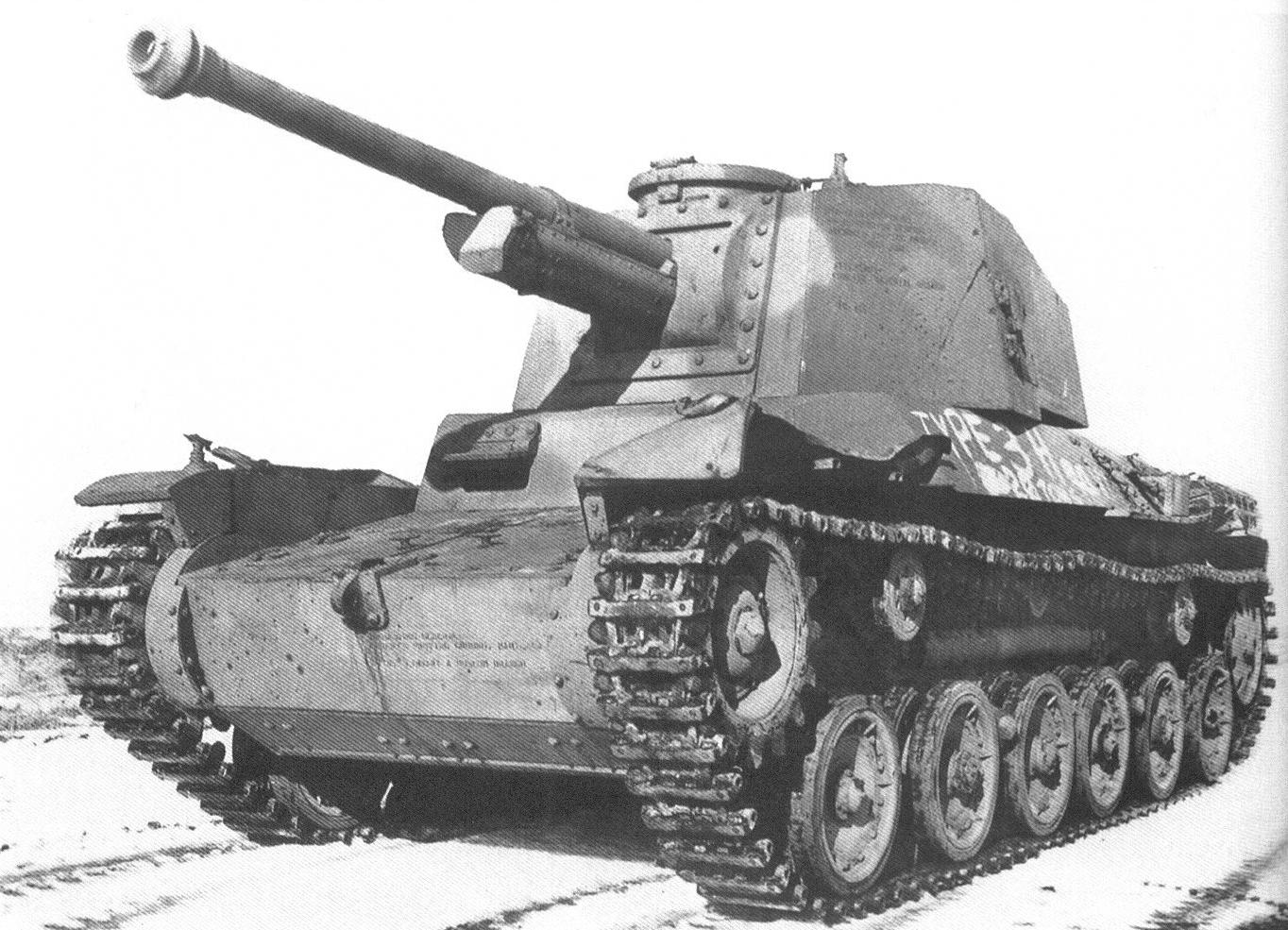
Type 3 Chi-Nu

The Type 3 Chi-Nu medium tank was urgently developed to counter the American M4 Sherman medium tank. Originally, the next tank in development to replace the Type 1 Chi-He was the Type 4 Chi-To medium tank. However, the development of the Type 4 Chi-To was delayed, and a "stopgap tank" was needed. Development of the Type 3 Chi-Nu occurred in 1943. It was the last design based directly on Type 97 lineage. The low priority given tanks, along with the raw material shortages meant that the Chi-Nu did not enter production until 1944. The Chi-Nu retained the same chassis and suspension of the Type 1 Chi-He, but with a new large hexagonal gun turret and a commander's cupola. The Type 3 75 mm tank gun was one of the largest guns used on Japanese tanks. The thickest armor used was 50 mm on the front hull; it also had 25 mm on the turret, 25 mm on the sides and 20 mm on the rear deck. The Chi-Nu was the best and most powerful IJA tank to go into general production and deployment. However, given the fact available raw materials were in very short supply, and with much of Japan's industrial infrastructure being destroyed by American strategic bombing in 1945, its production run was severely curtailed.

The Chi-Nu did not see combat during the war. All produced units were retained for the defense of the Japanese Homeland in anticipation of the projected Allied Invasion. They were to be part of the "Mobile Shock Force" to be used for counter-attacks against the anticipated Allied invasion. The 4th Tank Division based in Fukuoka on Kyushu had a "significant" number of the Type 3 Chi-Nu tanks produced at its depot by the end of the war.

=== Type 4 Chi-To medium tank ===
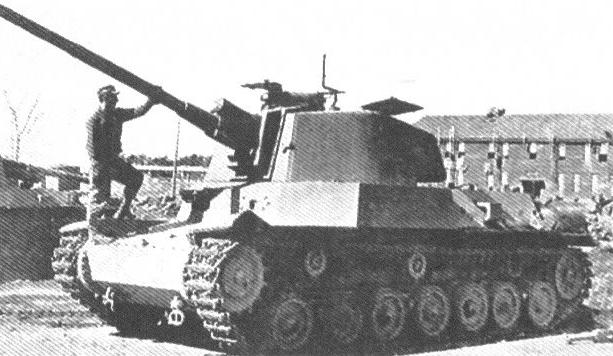
Type 4 Chi-To

The Type 4 medium tank Chi-To (四式中戦車 チト, Yonshiki chūsensha Chi-To) was one of several new medium and heavy tanks developed by the Imperial Japanese Army towards the end of World War II. It was the most advanced Japanese wartime tank to reach the production phase.

The Type 4 Chi-To was a thirty-ton, all-welded tank with a maximum armor thickness of about 75 mm. It was much larger than the Type 97 Chi-Ha, with a longer, wider, tall chassis, supported by seven road wheels on each side. The 400 hp (300 kW) gasoline engine was significantly more powerful than the 180 kW (240 hp) engine of the Type 3 Chi-Nu, giving it a top speed of 45 km/h (28 mph). The tank had a range of 250 km (160 mi). The main armament, a Type 5 75 mm tank gun, was based on the Type 4 75 mm AA Gun that was in turn essentially a copy of a Bofors Model 1929 75 mm AA Gun, housed in a large powered, well-armoured hexagonal gun turret. It had one Type 97 heavy tank machine gun mounted in the front hull, and there was a ball mount on the side of the turret for a second one. Two Type 4 Chi-To tanks were completed prior to the end of the war. Neither of the completed tanks saw combat use.

=== Type 5 Chi-Ri medium tank ===
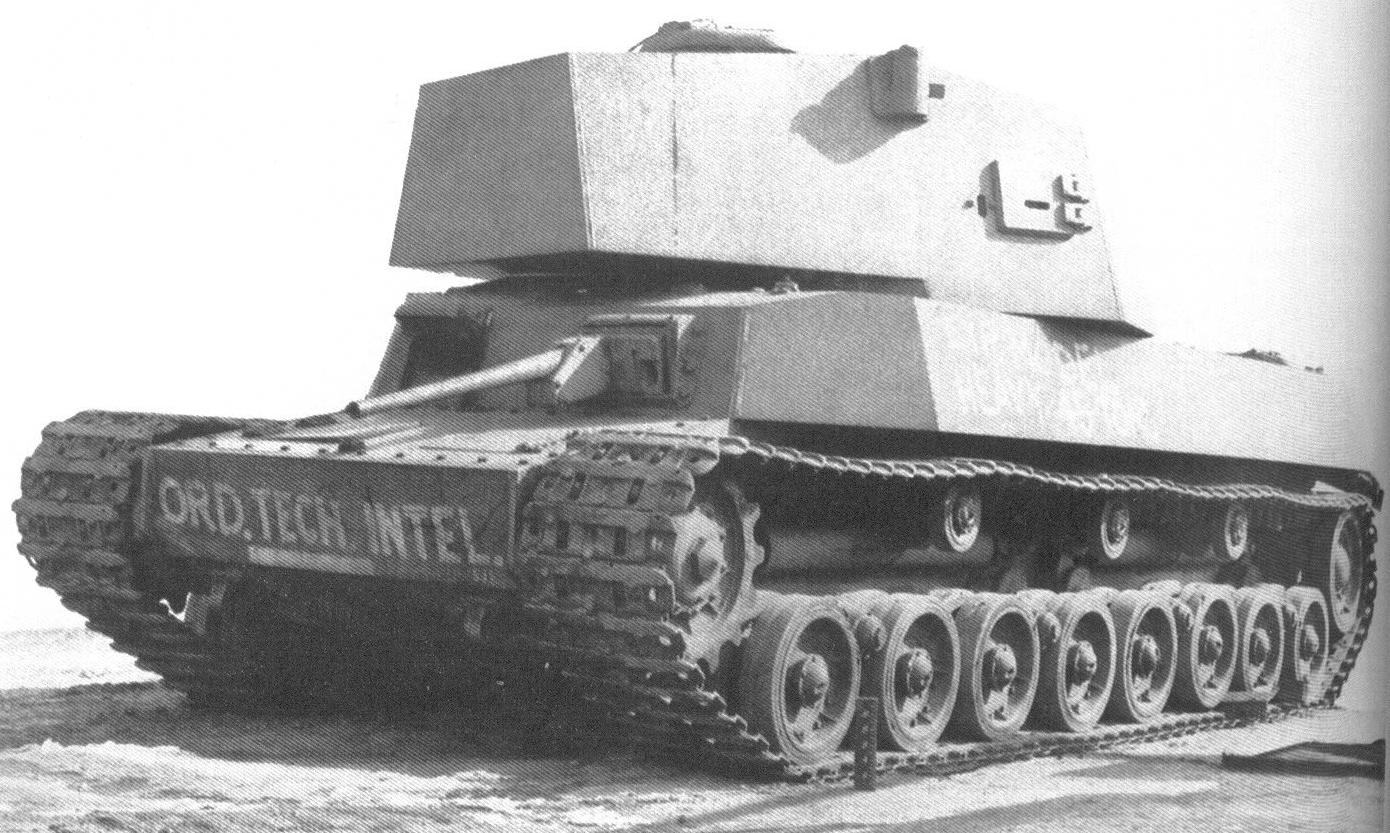
Incomplete prototype of the Type 5 Chi-Ri

The Type 5 medium tank Chi-Ri (五式中戦車, Go-shiki chusensha Chi-ri) was the ultimate medium tank developed by the Imperial Japanese Army in World War II. Intended to be a heavier, lengthened, more powerful version of Japan's sophisticated Type 4 Chi-To medium tank, in performance it was designed to surpass the US M4 Sherman medium tanks being fielded by the Allied forces. Originally, the tank was to be fitted with the same Type 5 75 mm tank gun used on the Type 4 Chi-To and with a front hull-mounted Type 1 37 mm tank gun. Eventually, an 88 mm gun (based on the Type 99 88 mm AA Gun) was planned for the turret. There were also plans for a variant known as the Type 5 Chi-Ri II, which was to be diesel powered and using the Type 5 75 mm tank gun as its main armament.

Along with the Type 4 Chi-To tanks, the Type 5 Chi-Ri was originally considered for use in the final defense of the Japanese home islands against the expected Allied invasions. However, the project was abandoned to free up manpower and critical resources to concentrate on the development and production of the more practical Type 4 Chi-To medium tank. As with many innovative weapons projects launched by Japan in the final months of World War II, production could not advance due to material shortages, and the loss of Japan's industrial infrastructure to the allied bombing of Japan. With the end of the Pacific War, an incomplete Type 5 prototype was seized by American forces during the occupation of Japan.

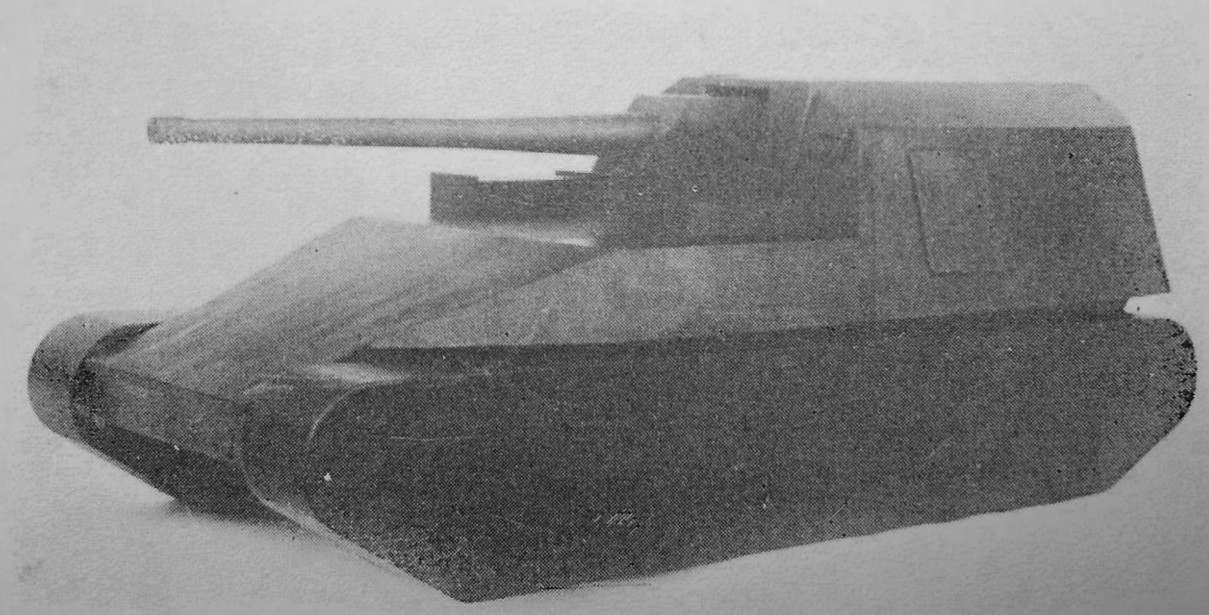
Experimental Type 5 gun tank Ho-Ri I mock-up scale model

As with other Japanese tanks there were variants of the Type 5 Chi-Ri planned. The experimental Type 5 Ho-Ri tank destroyer was a more powerful tank destroyer (gun tank) than ones already produced, such as, the Type 1 Ho-Ni I, Type 1 Ho-Ni II and Type 3 Ho-Ni III. The Type 5 Ho-Ri was to use a 105 mm cannon with an additional 37 mm gun mounted in the front hull. The superstructure for the main gun was placed at the rear, the engine was positioned in the center of the chassis and the driver's station was in the front hull section; all similar in design to the German Ferdinand/Elefant heavy tank destroyer. Another planned version was to have a twin 25 mm anti-aircraft gun mounted on top of the rear casemate superstructure. There was also a planned variant known as the Ho-Ri II, with the boxy superstructure for the main 105 mm cannon designed to be integral with the hull's sides and placed at the center of the chassis (similar to the German Jagdtiger). The 105 mm main gun was produced and tested. However, according to multiple sources, no prototypes of the Ho-Ri were completed.

=== O-I super-heavy tank ===
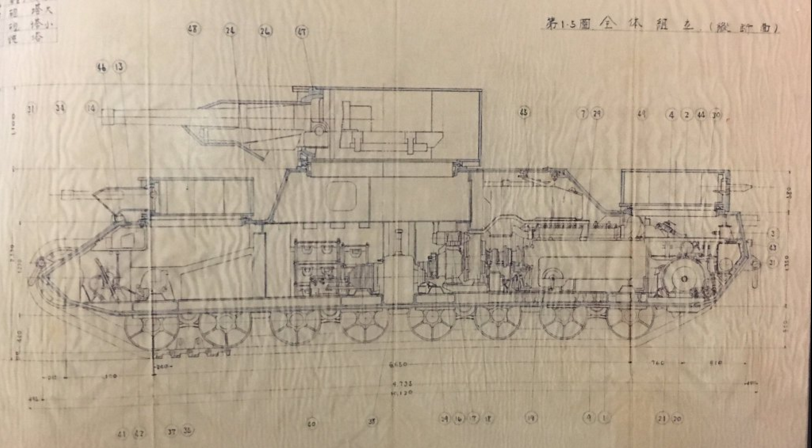
Diagram of the interior side view of the O-I

The O-I experimental super-heavy tank had four turrets and weighed 120+ tons and required a crew of 11 men. It was 10 meters long by 4.2 meters wide with an overall height of 4 meters. The armor was 200 mm at its maximum, and the tank had a top speed of 25 km/h. It had two gasoline engines, and was armed in the main central turret with a modified Type 92 105 mm cannon, and several smaller turrets on the hull in the front and rear. According to Akira Takizawa (on the original plans), the tank was to have a 70 mm gun in each of the two forward sub-turrets and two Type 97 7.7 mm machine guns in the rear sub-turret. It has been reported that an incomplete prototype without turrets was built, with the project ending after the tank proved to be "impractical". However, the complete development history of the O-I prototype is unknown and no photographs of the incomplete O-I are known to exist.

=== Amphibious tanks ===
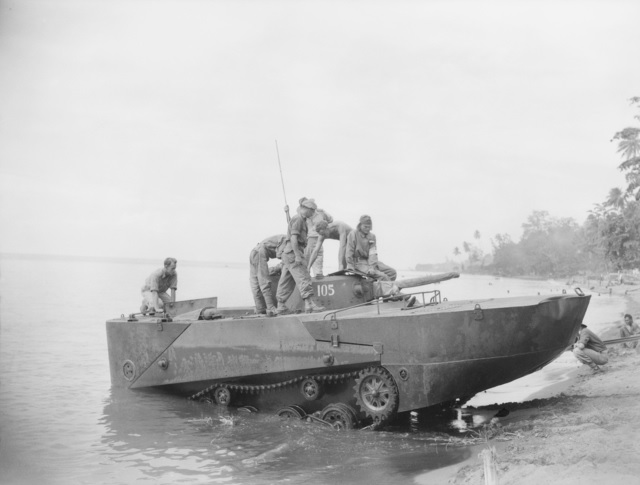
Australian soldiers testing a Type 2 Ka-Mi, 1945

During the 1930s and 1940s, Japan produced a number of amphibious tank designs, including prototypes such as the Sumida amphibious armored car (AMP), SR I-Go, SR II Ro-Go, SR III Ha-Go, Type 1 Mi-Sha (a/k/a Type 1 Ka-Mi) and Type 5 To-Ku. Production amphibious tanks included the Type 2 Ka-Mi, and Type 3 Ka-Chi; production amphibious transports included the F B swamp vehicle and Type 4 Ka-Tsu APC. All production units were for use by the Japanese Special Naval Landing Forces in campaigns in the Pacific with amphibious operations.

The Type 1 Mi-Sha was an early experimental design that led to the first production Japanese amphibious tank known as the Type 2 Ka-Mi, which was based on the Type 95 Ha-Go light tank chassis. Production began in 1942 with only 182 to 184 units being produced. Type 2 Ka-Mi was first used in combat on Guadalcanal in late 1942. Later they were encountered by US forces in fighting on the Marshall Islands, the Mariana Islands and on the Philippine island of Leyte in late 1944.

The Type 3 Ka-Chi was based on an extensively modified Type 1 Chi-He medium tank and was a larger and more capable version of the earlier Type 2 Ka-Mi. However, given the fact the main priorities of the navy were in warship and aircraft production, and lacking in any definite plans for additional amphibious operations, production of the Type 3 Ka-Chi remained a very low priority. Only 12 to 19 Type 3 Ka-Chi tanks were built by the end of the war.

The Type 5 To-Ku was a large, heavy prototype based on the Type 5 Chi-Ri chassis and Type 3 Ka-Chi. It was fitted with a modified turret of the one used on the Type 97 Shinhoto Chi-Ha medium tank that mounted a Type 1 25 mm gun. In addition, it had a front hull mounted Type 1 47 mm tank gun. The suspension, pontoons and propulsion system were substantially the same as the Type 3 Ka-Chi.

=== Overall production ===
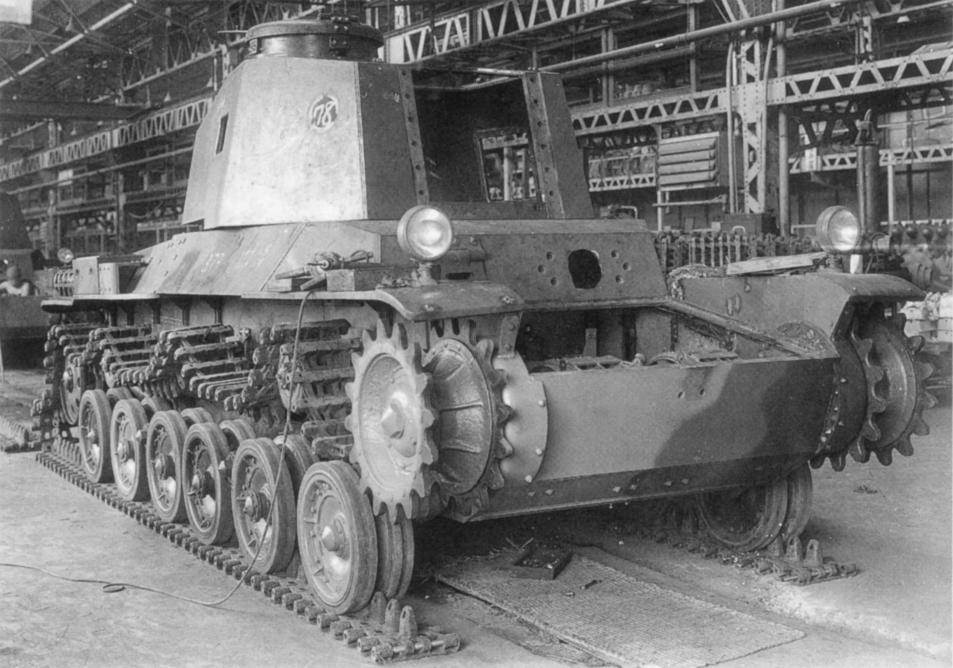
Type 3 Chi-Nu tank at the final stage of assembly

In the period between 1931 and 1938 the Japanese built nearly 1,700 new tanks By 1939, Japan produced 2,020 operational tanks. In the following year, Japan had the 5th largest tank force in the world. The peak of Japanese tank production was in 1942, but declined afterwards owing to aircraft and warship priorities, along with material shortages. By 1944, total production of tanks and AFV's had fallen to 925 and for 1945, only 256 were produced. Japan developed many experimental and operative armored vehicles, tanks and tank-destroyer types throughout the war; but largely held them in reserve, for home-land defense.

== See also ==
- List of Japanese armored divisions
- List of Japanese armoured fighting vehicles of World War II
- Tanks of Japan
