= Type 5 To-Ku =

- Type: Amphibious tank
- Place of origin: Empire of Japan

Production history
- Designed: 1945

Specifications
- Mass: 29.1 tons
- Length: 10.8 m (with floats)
- Width: 3.0 m
- Height: 3.38 m
- Crew: 7
- Armor: 10–50 mm
- Main armament: Type 1 47 mm gun
- Secondary armament: 1× 25 mm gun 2× 7.7 mm Type 97 MG's
- Engine: water-cooled 12-cylinder Mitsubishi diesel 240 hp
- Power/weight: 8 hp/ton
- Suspension: bellcrank
- Operational range: 320 km (unknown if referring to sea or land)
- Maximum speed: 32 km/h (land); 10 km/h (water)

The Special Type 5 Launch To-Ku (特五式内火艇 トク, toku-go-shiki uchibitei To-Ku) was a Japanese prototype amphibious tank developed in 1945. The development status by the end of the Pacific War is not clearly known.

The To-Ku was large and heavy; it boasted extensive armor protection with 50 mm of armor plate in the front hull. The turret was a modified version of the one used on the Type 97 Shinhoto Chi-Ha medium tank that was fitted with a Type 1 25 mm gun and a rear facing Type 97 7.7 mm machine gun. The front hull mounted a Type 1 47 mm tank gun and a Type 97 7.7 mm machine gun. The chassis was based on the Type 5 Chi-Ri medium tank and the suspension, pontoons and propulsion system were substantially the same as the Type 3 Ka-Chi. According to one source, a prototype was completed by the end of the war. According to another source, a prototype was not completed by the end of the war.
