= Type 5 Na-To =

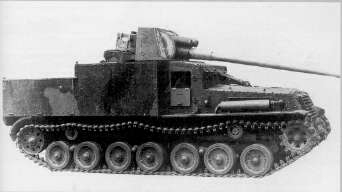
- Experimental 7.5cm self-propelled AT gun Na-To
- Type: Self-propelled anti-tank gun
- Place of origin: Empire of Japan

Production history
- No. built: 2

Specifications
- Mass: 15 tons
- Length: 5.80 meters
- Width: 2.40 meters
- Height: 2.75 meters
- Crew: 7
- Armor: 12 mm max
- Main armament: Type 5 75 mm gun
- Secondary armament: Type 97 7.7 mm machine gun
- Engine: diesel 165 PS/2000 rpm 150 hp (110 kW)
- Suspension: bellcrank
- Maximum speed: 40 km/h

The Type 5 Na-To (五式砲戦車, Go-shiki hōsensha), officially known as the Experimental 7.5cm self-propelled anti-tank gun Na-To (試製七糎半対戦車自走砲 ナト, Shisei nana-senchimētoru hantaisensha jisōhō Na-To) was the penultimate self-propelled anti-tank gun developed by the Imperial Japanese Army in 1945, during the closing stages of World War II.

== History and development ==
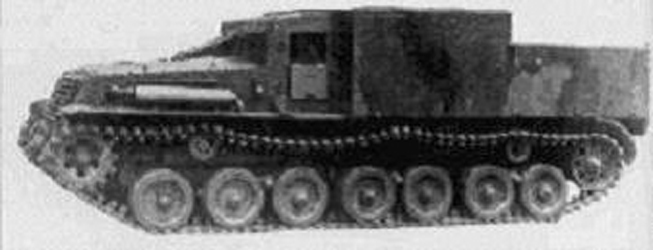
Side view of a Type 4 Chi-So armored medium tracked carrier that served as the basis for the Type 5 Na-To

Towards the end of the Pacific War, Japanese field commanders realized that nothing in the inventory of the Japanese Army would be able to withstand the increasingly advanced tanks and armored vehicles fielded by the Allies, and that a more powerful version of the Type 3 Ho-Ni III was necessary. Development was rushed through on a new design, which was completed in 1945. The Japanese Army immediately issued an order for 200 units to be completed in 1945. However, by that time production was impossible due to material shortages, and by the bombing of Japan in World War II, and testing was not yet completed by the end of the war.

== Design ==
The Type 5 Na-To made use of the chassis and superstructure of the Type 4 Chi-So armored medium tracked carrier. The superstructure had an open top and rear, with an enclosed armored drivers cab. For the Type 5 Na-To there was added a "shielded platform" for its main gun. Its main anti-tank armament consisted of a Type 5 75 mm tank gun, which was the same gun mounted in the Type 4 Chi-To medium tank. The gun was a variant of the Japanese Type 4 75 mm AA gun.

== Service record ==
The Type 5 Na-To tank destroyer was intended to become part of the defenses of the Japanese home islands against the projected Allied Invasion. By the time of the surrender of Japan, only two units had been completed and had field testing done.

== Gallery ==
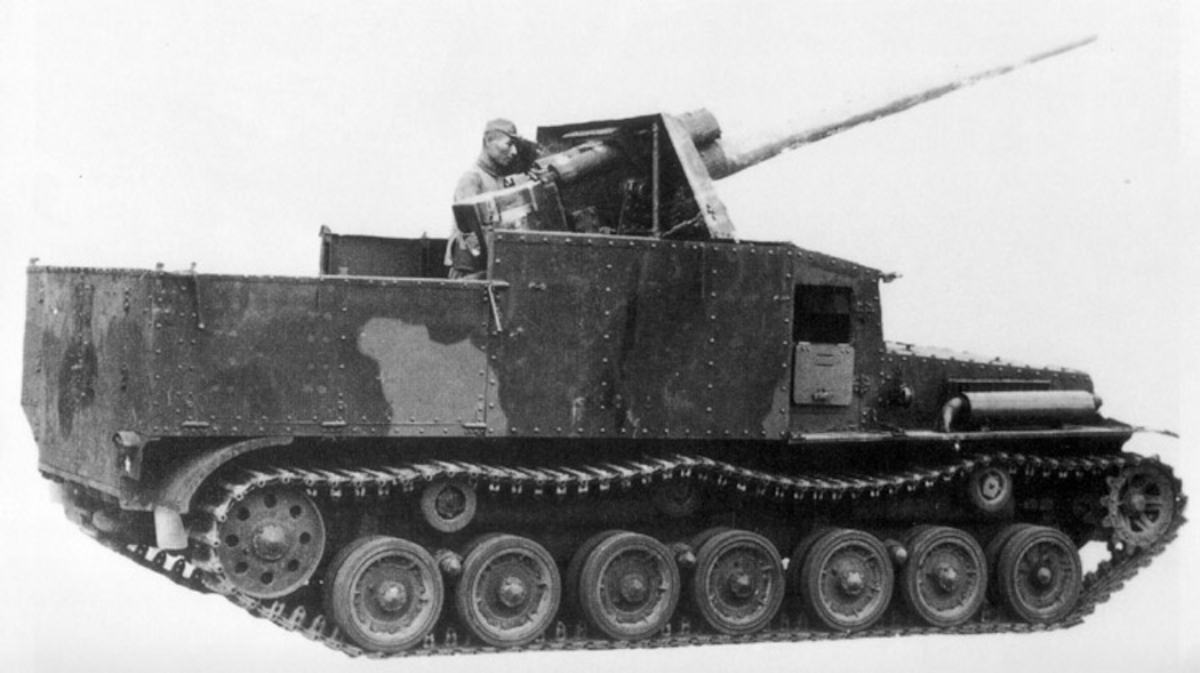
Side view of a Type 5 Na-To

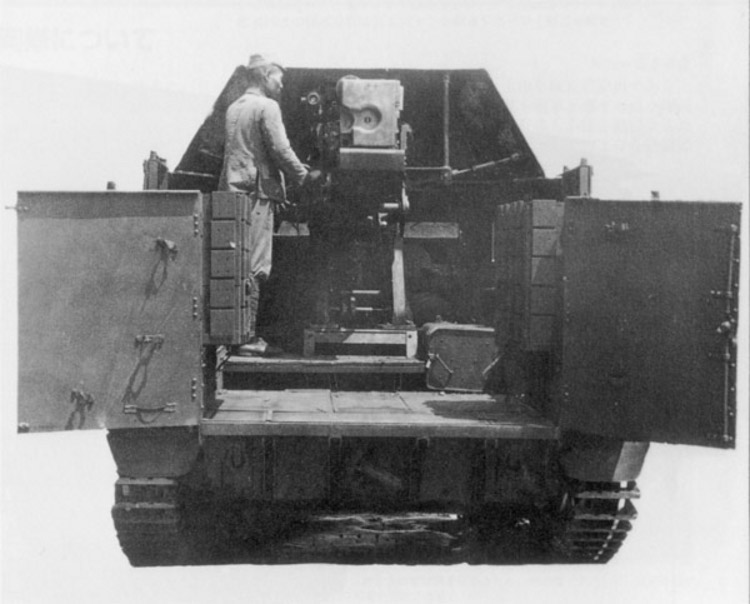
Rear view of a Type 5 Na-To with compartment doors open

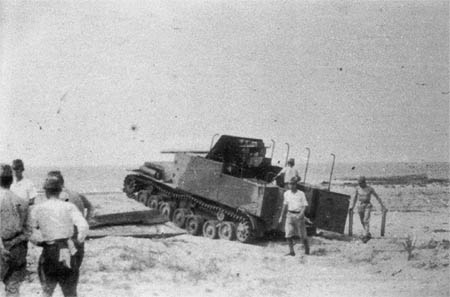
Type 5 Na-To during field testing in 1945
