= Type 5 Ke-Ho light tank =

Type 5 Ke-Ho
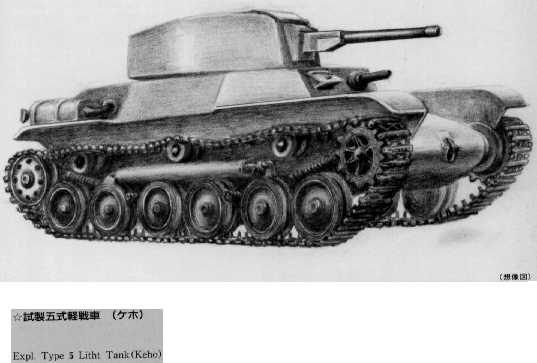
- Type 5 Ke-Ho light tank
- Type: Light tank
- Place of origin: Empire of Japan

Production history
- Designed: completed 1942
- Produced: 1945
- No. built: 1 (prototype)

Specifications
- Mass: 10 tons
- Length: 4.38 meters
- Width: 2.23 meters
- Height: 2.23 meters
- Crew: 4
- Armor: 8-20 mm
- Main armament: Type 1 47 mm tank gun
- Secondary armament: Type 97 7.7mm machine gun
- Engine: Type 100 straight six-cylinder supercharged air cooled diesel 150 HP
- Suspension: bellcrank
- Maximum speed: 50 km/h

The Type 5 light tank Ke-Ho (五式軽戦車 ケホ, Go-shiki keisensha Keho) was a prototype light tank developed by the Imperial Japanese Army at the end of World War II.

== History and development ==
In 1938, development began for a new light tank for the Japanese Army. While the Type 95 Ha-Go had performed well against the National Revolutionary Army of the China in the Second Sino-Japanese War and successfully engaged United States M3 Stuart light tanks on the Bataan Peninsula in December 1941, it was quickly growing obsolete. Although its 37mm gun was adequate for most light armor designed and built in the 1930s, the Ha-Go, like the tanks of the US Army prior to 1941, was not designed to fight enemy tanks, but rather to support the infantry. The Type 95's light armor made it vulnerable to .50 caliber machine gun fire and attempts to address these shortcomings via the Type 98 Ke-Ni and Type 2 Ke-To were steps in the right direction, but were still insufficient. Therefore, a complete design review was held and a prototype for a new standard light tank was completed by 1942. At this point the project was shelved, as the Imperial Japanese Army General Staff had to concede to the Imperial Navy's needs of raw materials necessary for the production of warships and warplanes. Mass production was finally authorized in 1945, by which time it was too late. Production was impossible due to shortages of materials such as steel, and the bombing of Japan. Only a single prototype was completed by the Hino Jido Sha company by the end of World War II.

== Design ==
=== Armor ===
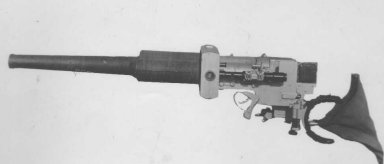
Short 47 mm tank gun

The Type 5 Ke-Ho was originally to mount a short 47 mm tank gun as its main armament. However, during later development the decision was made to mount the standard Type 1 47 mm main gun in the turret. The tank had armor of up to 20 mm, an improvement over existing Japanese light tanks. The tank weighed 10 tons due to increased armor thickness and a bigger engine. The two-man turret layout drew on previous design experience from the Type 1 Chi-He.

=== Mobility ===
The tank was powered by a Type 100 air cooled diesel engine yielding 150 HP, for a top speed of 50 km/h. The tank also had a fuel tank capacity of 130 L.
