= Type 5 Chi-Ri medium tank =

Type 5 Chi-Ri
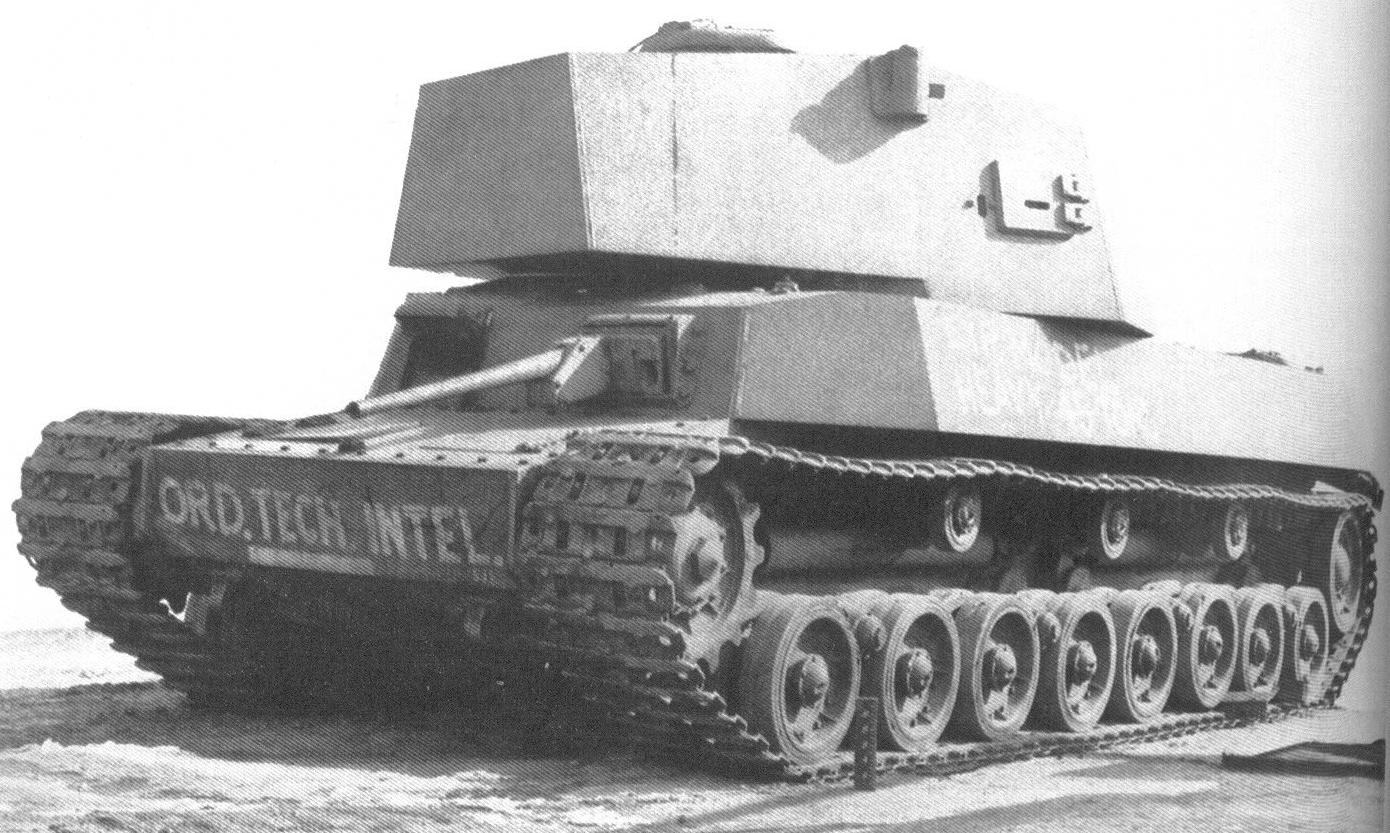
- Incomplete prototype of the Type 5 Chi-Ri after capture by American forces
- Type: Medium tank
- Place of origin: Empire of Japan

Production history
- Designed: 1943–1944
- No. built: 1 (incomplete prototype)

Specifications
- Mass: 37.6 tonnes (40.8 US short tons; 81,571 lb)
- Length: 7.3 m (23 ft 11 in)
- Width: 3.05 m (10 ft 0 in)
- Height: 3.05 m (10 ft 0 in)
- Crew: 5
- Armor: 25–75 millimetres (0.98–2.95 in)
- Main armament: Type 5 75 mm tank gun (L/56.4)
- Secondary armament: Type 1 37 mm tank gun and 2 X 7.7mm Type 97 heavy tank machine guns
- Engine: water-cooled Kawasaki Type 98 aircraft engine (petrol); 550 hp (14.86 hp/tonne)
- Suspension: bellcrank
- Operational range: 250 kilometers
- Maximum speed: 45 km/h (28 mph)

The Type 5 medium tank Chi-Ri (五式中戦車 チリ, Go-shiki chusensha Chi-ri) ("Imperial Year 2605 Medium Tank Model 9") was a medium tank developed by the Imperial Japanese Army in World War II. It was intended to be a heavier, more powerful version of Japan's prototype Type 4 Chi-To medium tank. Only one incomplete prototype was built.

== History and development ==
Based on battlefield information from the Eastern Front, the Department of Army Weaponry published a report demanding a shift of tank design focus from infantry-support tanks to tanks specialised for anti-tank missions. The Army's requirements for the new medium tank were an increase of weight from 20 tonnes to 35 tonnes and an armour upgrade from 50 mm to 75 mm. The new tank would be mounted with a new 75 mm tank gun instead of the previous 57 mm tank gun. Production focus would also prioritise quality over quantity. The new medium tank was designated as Type 5 Medium Tank Chi-Ri (五式中戦車 チリ).

A single unarmed prototype of the Type 5 Chi-Ri was completed by May 1945. The project was abruptly abandoned to free up manpower and critical resources to concentrate on the development and production of the more practical Type 4 Chi-To medium tank. As with many innovative weapons projects launched by Japan in the final years of World War II, production could not advance beyond either small numbers or the prototype stage due to material shortages, and the loss of Japan's industrial infrastructure to the Allied bombing of Japan.

== Design ==
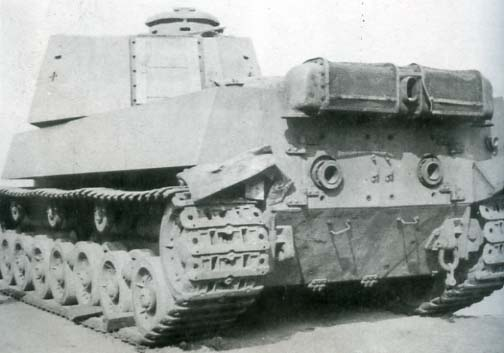
Side-rear angle view of Type 5 Chi-Ri captured, post-surrender

The Type 5 Chi-Ri was of all-welded construction. It featured a lengthened version of the Type 4 Chi-To chassis, with eight road wheels per side instead of the seven of the Chi-To. It had the usual Japanese track arrangement with forward mounted drive sprockets and rear mounted idlers. The Type 5 Chi-Ri had welded armor, with a maximum thickness of 75 mm at the front hull; 25–50 mm on the side; 50 mm on the rear and 50 mm on the turret.

The Type 5 Chi-Ri was initially to be powered by a Mitsubishi Diesel engine, but the advancements needed to provide the necessary horsepower fell behind schedule, and an 800 hp V-12 gasoline-fueled aircraft engine designed by BMW in Germany and licensed to Kawasaki Heavy Industries in Japan was selected instead. The "Kawasaki Type 98 800 HP engine Ha-9-IIb" was detuned for the tank to 550 hp.

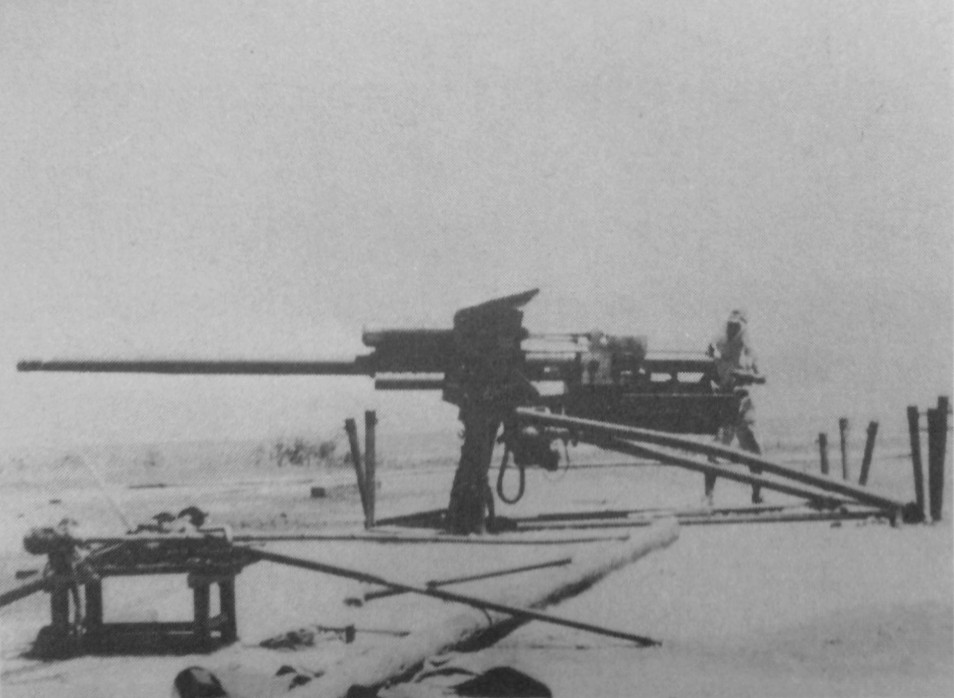
Type 5 75 mm tank gun Mark I (semi-auto loader)

The tank had a hexagonal gun turret and on the left side of the turret roof was a commander's cupola. In front of that was a crew hatch. The prototype tank was to be fitted with the Type 5 75 mm tank gun (based on the Type 4 75 mm AA gun) equipped with an automatic loading system. Secondary weapons consisted of a fixed front hull-mounted Type 1 37 mm tank gun and two 7.7mm Type 97 machine guns. One coaxial Type 97 machine gun was fitted in the front hull next to the Type 1 37 mm tank gun and a ball mounted Type 97 machine gun was on the left side of the turret. Two other sources, only mention the fixed front hull-mounted Type 1 37 mm tank gun as an incorporated secondary weapon for this prototype tank. There were also plans for a Type 5 Chi-Ri II, to be diesel powered and using the Type 5 75 mm tank gun as its main armament.

== Service history ==
As with the Type 4 Chi-To tanks, the Type 5 Chi-Ri was originally considered for the final defense of the Japanese home islands against the expected Allied invasions. However, only the one unarmed prototype had been completed by the time the war in the Pacific came to an end.

The prototype Type 5 Chi-Ri was seized by American forces during the occupation of Japan and earmarked for tests at the Aberdeen Proving Grounds. After being shipped there, the prototype was eventually scrapped in 1952.

== Variants ==
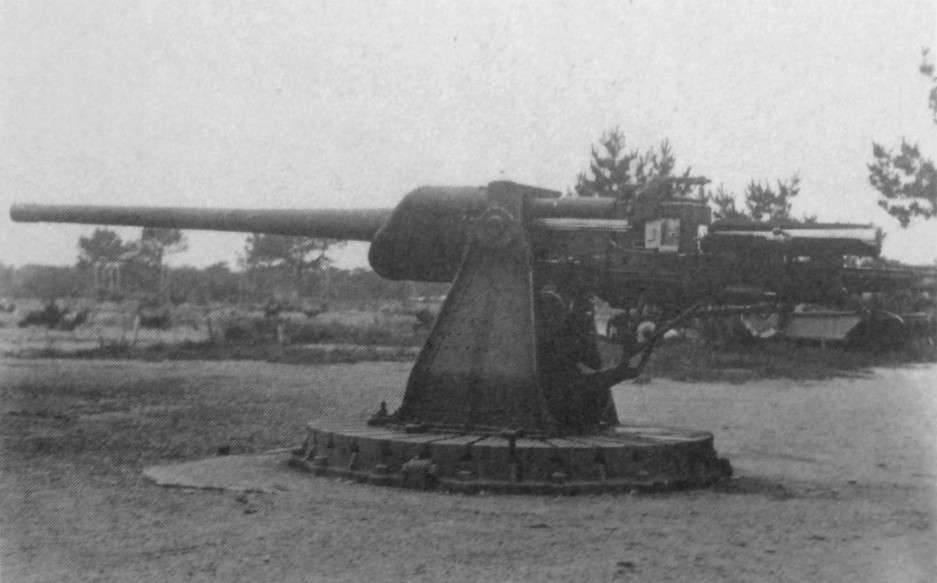
Experimental 105 mm tank gun

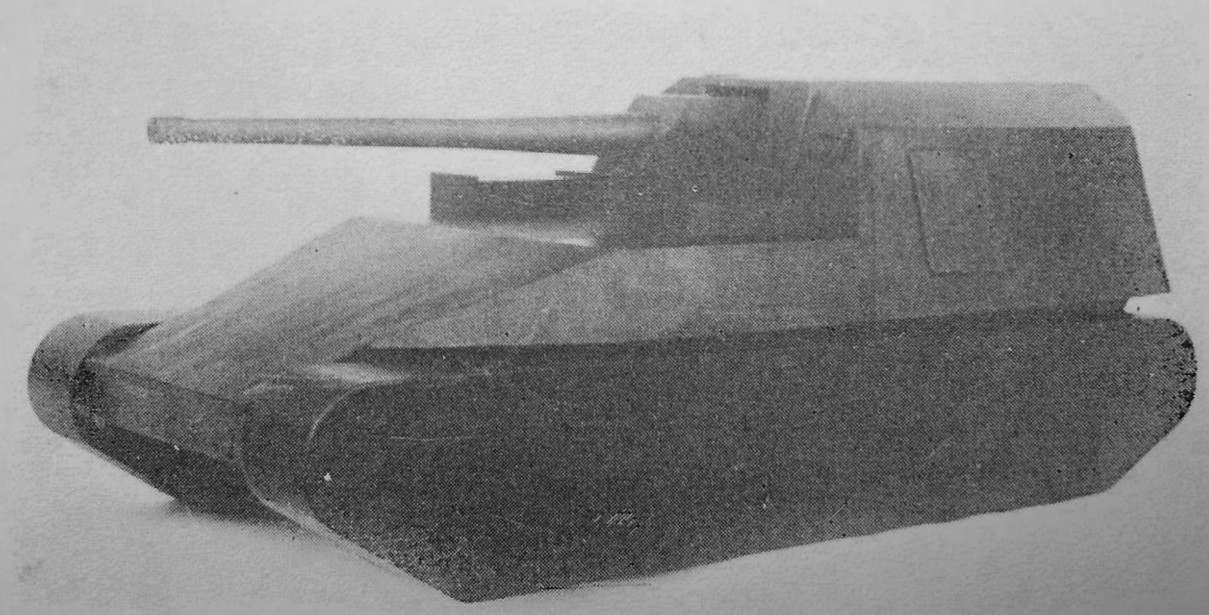
Experimental Type 5 gun tank Ho-Ri I mock-up scale model

The Ho-Ri I was a tank destroyer version using a 105 mm cannon in place of the 75 mm gun design and an additional 37 mm gun in the front armored plate. The Ho-Ri was to use the Type 5 Chi-Ri tank chassis and have a crew of six. The superstructure for the main gun was placed at the rear and to have sloped armor up to 30 mm thick; the engine was positioned in the center area of the chassis and the driver's station was in the front hull section. All similar in design to the German Ferdinand/Elefant heavy tank destroyer. According to "The National Institute for Defense Studies, Ministry of Defense, Military Administration of Munitions Mobilization, Production Chart of January to April of 1945", the plan was to produce a total of 5 Ho-Ri gun tanks by March 1945. The 105 mm main gun was produced and tested. However, no prototypes are known to have been completed. Another version of the Ho-Ri was to have a twin 25 mm anti-aircraft gun mounted on top of the rear casemate superstructure in a "swivel mount".

A second variant planned was the Ho-Ri II heavy tank destroyer. It was to use the Type 5 Chi-Ri tank chassis. The boxy superstructure for the main gun was completely integral with the hull's sides and placed at the center of the chassis (similar in design to the German Jagdtiger). The engine compartment was moved in the rear area of the chassis. It was to use a 105 mm cannon as its main armament.

== Sources ==
- Hara, Tomio (1972). Japanese Medium Tanks. AFV Weapons Profiles No. 49. Profile Publications Limited.
- McCormack, David (2021). Japanese Tanks and Armoured Warfare 1932–45. Fonthill. ISBN 978-1-78155-810-2.
- Tomczyk, Andrzej (2005). Japanese Armor Vol. 4. AJ Press. ISBN 978-8372371676.
- Tomczyk, Andrzej (2007). Japanese Armor Vol. 5. AJ Press. ISBN 978-8372371799.
- Zaloga, Steven J. (2007). Japanese Tanks 1939–45. Osprey. ISBN 978-1-8460-3091-8.
