= Type 1 Chi-He medium tank =

Medium tank of the Imperial Japanese Army in World War II

Type 1 Chi-He
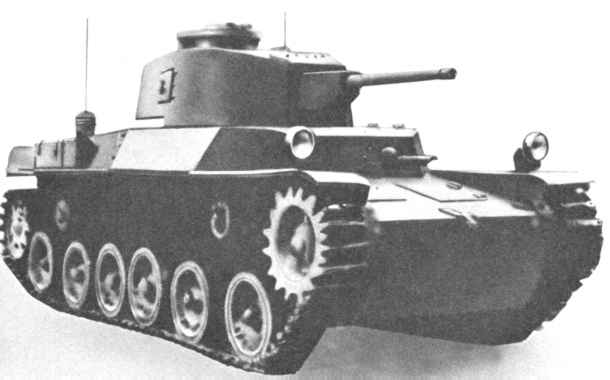
- Type 1 Chi-He
- Type: Medium tank
- Place of origin: Empire of Japan

Production history
- Designed: 1941
- Produced: 1943–1944
- No. built: 170

Specifications
- Mass: 17.2 tonnes (19.0 tons)
- Length: 5.5 m (18 ft 1 in)
- Width: 2.2 m (7 ft 3 in)
- Height: 2.38 m (7 ft 10 in)
- Crew: 5
- Armor: 20–50 mm
- Main armament: Type 1 47 mm tank gun (Armor Penetration: 55 mm at 100 m, 40 mm at 500 m, 30 mm at 1,000 m)
- Secondary armament: 2 × 7.7mm Type 97 machine gun (hull, coaxial)
- Engine: Mitsubishi Type 100 air-cooled V-12 diesel 240 hp (179 kW)/2,000 rpm/21,700 cc
- Suspension: bellcrank
- Operational range: 210 kilometers
- Maximum speed: 44 km/h (27 mph)

The Type 1 medium tank Chi-He (一式中戦車 チへ, Ichi-shiki chū-sensha Chi-he) was an improved version of the Type 97 Chi-Ha medium tanks of the Imperial Japanese Army in World War II. It had a more powerful main gun, engine and thicker armor. It was the first Japanese tank to have a communication radio as standard equipment. Production of the tank did not begin until 1943, due to the higher priority of steel allocated to the Imperial Navy for warship construction. A total of 170 units were built. All of the tanks produced were allocated for the defense of the Japanese home islands, against the anticipated Allied Invasion.

== History and development ==
After 1941, the Imperial Japanese Army quickly realized that its 1930s designed medium tank, the Type 97 Chi-Ha, was inferior to the 1940s generation of Allied armor, such as the M4 Sherman. Since the Type 97’s low-velocity 57 mm main gun was designed for infantry support in 1938, it could not penetrate the 1940s generation of Allied armor, whereas its own thin armor made the Type 97 vulnerable to most adversaries equipped with anti-armor capabilities.

In response, a new series of tanks based on an improved Type 97 design was conceived. The first of this new series was the Type 1 Chi-He. Work on the design began in 1941. However, production did not begin until 1943, due to the higher priority of steel allocated to the Imperial Navy for warship construction. A total of 170 units were built from 1943–44, and they did not see any combat.

== Design ==
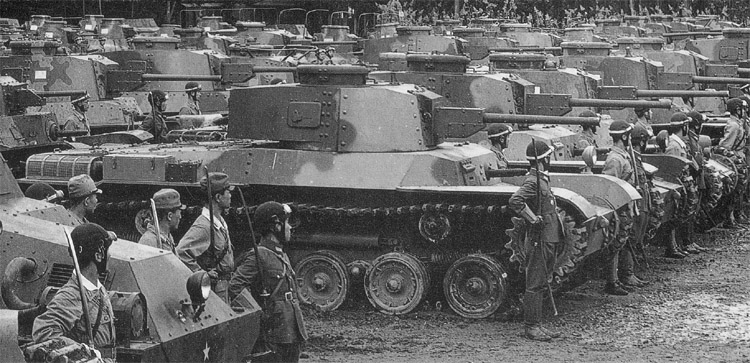
Type 1 Chi-He

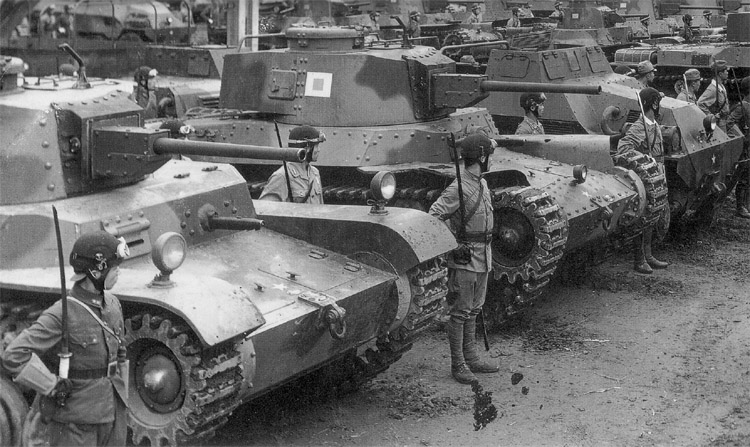
Type 1 Chi-He on left and Type 97 Shinhoto Chi-Ha on right

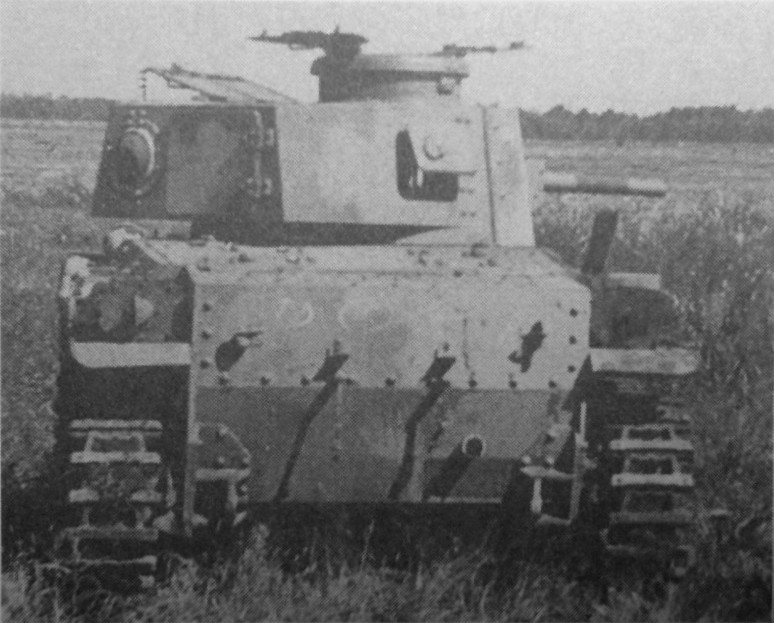
Type 1 Chi-He rear view

Compared to the Type 97, the Type 1 Chi-He was slightly longer and taller. Its angled, thicker frontal armor was welded, as opposed to riveted. The adding of the frontal armor and a fifth crewman increased the weight, but the "streamlining" of the hull reduced the increase to only 1.5 tons.

The Mitsubishi Type 100 diesel engine at 240 hp generated 70 horsepower more than the Mitsubishi Type 97 diesel engine, and was thus more than able to compensate for the additional weight in armor.

The Type 1 Chi-He's 47 mm high-velocity gun had a barrel length of 2.250 mm, a muzzle velocity of 810 m/s (2,700 ft/s), and a penetration capability of 55 mm/100 m, 40 mm/500, 30 mm/1,000 meters; over double that of the Type 97s low-velocity main gun. It was more reliable and more accurate, with the gun barrel having a 16 groove rifling and an improved firing mechanism. The gun did require the installation of elevation gear (on the earlier Type 97 the gunner had to physically move the gun up or down on his shoulder). In light of these improvements, the gun was adequate against Allied armor. The ammunition was the same as used with the anti-tank version of the gun. The tanks carried 120 rounds of ammunition with both armor-piercing and armor-piecing high explosive shells. The gun was placed in a three-man turret, which had space for the commander, gun-layer and loader. The gun could be elevated and depressed between +20 and -15 degrees. This gun was used in the Type 97 ShinHōtō Chi-Ha medium tank, and on the Type 3 Ka-Chi amphibious tank.

The Type 1 Chi-He was also the first Japanese tank to carry a radio as standard equipment in each tank, eliminating the need to use signal flags.

== Combat record ==
All Type 1 Chi-He tanks were allocated to the Japanese home islands to defend against the projected Allied Invasion. Despite Type 1's superiority in terms of armor and firepower over the earlier Type 97, it still underperformed in comparison to the American M4 Sherman, leading to a new medium tank design known as the Type 3 Chi-Nu.

== Variants ==
The Type 3 Chi-Nu medium tank retained the same hull and suspension of the Type 1 Chi-He, with the addition of an enlarged turret ring for the new large hexagonal gun turret with a commander's cupola. The more powerful main armament, a Type 3 75 mm tank gun, was based on the Japanese Type 90 field gun.

A more direct variant was the Ka-So command tank. It was to replace the older Shi-Ki command tank. The Ka-So was based on the Type 1 Chi-He and had additional radios in its turret. A wood dummy main gun was placed in the turret. This way the Ka-So did not stand out from the regular tanks like the older Shi-Ki models, which had a machine gun in the turret and a 37 mm gun on the hull. The status of the command tank as far as production is unknown.

The experimental anti-aircraft tank Ta-Ha was a planned anti-aircraft tank based on the Type 1 Chi-He hull in 1944. The design called for the tank turret to be replaced by a rotatably mounted anti-aircraft gun in a twin mount behind a gun shield. One prototype tank was under construction at the end of the war.

Another variant designed in 1944 was the Type 2 Ku-Se self-propelled gun (SPG). It used the Type 1 Chi-He hull and was armed with a 75 mm gun in an open casemate with light frontal armour only. The open casemate was in the same shape as the one used on the Type 1 Ho-Ni I.

== See also ==
Japanese tanks of World War II

=== Tanks of comparable role, performance and era ===
- German Panzer III
- Soviet T-50
