= Type 5 75 mm tank gun =

Japanese tank gun

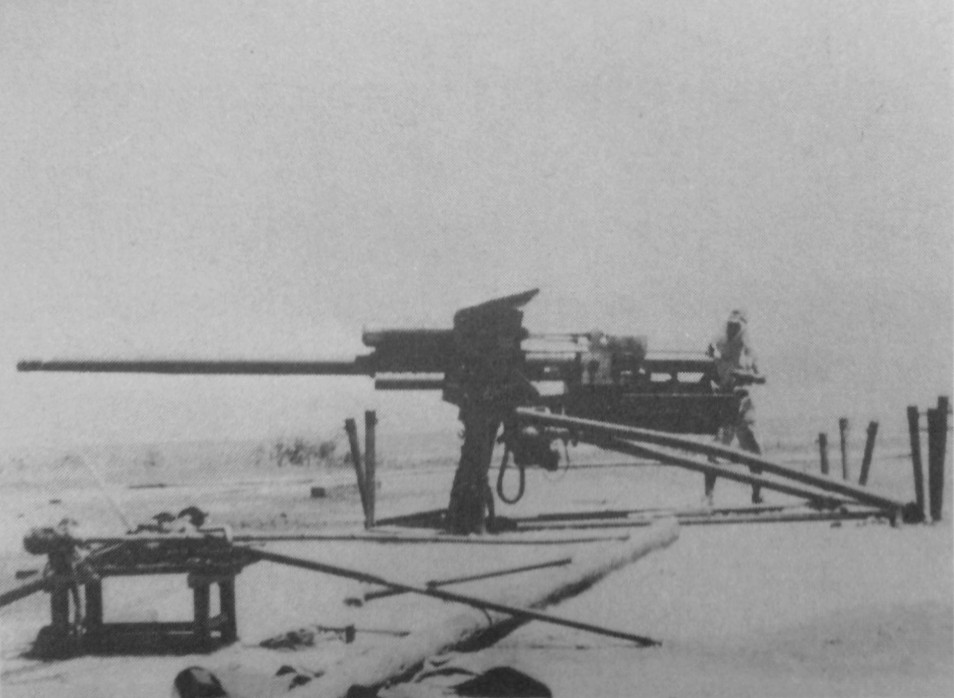
Type 5 75 mm tank gun Mark I

The Type 5 75 mm tank gun was used as the main armament of the Imperial Japanese Army prototype Type 4 Chi-To medium tank. It was one of the largest tank guns to be fitted on a World War II Japanese tank. Due to late war shortage-induced delays only two were ever mounted in a completed Type 4 Chi-To, neither of which saw combat use. The tank gun was also used on the prototype Type 5 Chi-Ri medium tank and prototype Type 5 Na-To tank destroyer.

== Design and testing ==
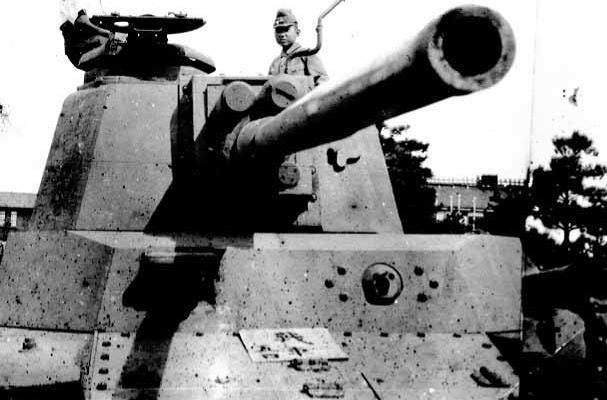
Front angle close-up of Type 4 Chi-To with Type 5 75 mm tank gun

The Type 5 75 mm tank gun was intended as the main armament of the Type 4 Chi-To medium tank, a planned improvement over the Imperial Army's most powerful production tank, the Type 3 Chi-Nu. The first prototype Type 4 Chi-To was delivered in 1944. Though the most advanced and powerful Japanese tank to leave the drawing board, late war industrial and material shortages resulted in only two being completed.

The long-barreled 75 mm L/56.4 (4.23 m) tank gun was a variant of the Japanese Type 4 75 mm AA gun, which went into production in 1943. The prototype was tested at the Osaka Army Arsenal and two guns were completed in July 1944. Modifications were made, including removing the semi-automatic loader and adding a balance weight by October 1944. Mounted in the large, hexagonal turret of the Type 4 Chi-To, it was capable of being elevated between -6.5 to +20 degrees.

Testing of the tank gun was performed by the Japanese Army with a varying degree of results as to armour penetration ability depending on the test conditions, including the target armour plate. According to the "Outline of the Effectiveness of Existing Anti-Tank Weapons and Materials" of the Imperial Guards 3rd Division, which is a document in the collection of the War History Instructor's Office of the Ground Self-Defense Force Officer College, the armor-piercing shells of the 75 TA (the military code for the 75 mm anti-tank gun) have a range of 1000 m with penetrating steel plate thickness of 100 mm. However, the exact type of steel plate was not described. Subsequently, 9 March 1945, a shooting test was conducted at the Fuji Susono Training Area. During the test, 22 prototype Type 4 high-explosive shells and two Type 3 anti-aircraft shells were fired, before the firing system malfunctioned. From 17 to 19 March, a cast turret equipped with a prototype Type 5 75 mm tank gun (long) II was mounted on a prototype vehicle and a firing test was conducted at the Irago Range. The results of testing 72 Type 1 armor-piercing shells and 68 Type 4 high-explosive shells were favorable. The muzzle velocity was 821 m/s (Type 1 armor-piercing bullet) to 819 m/s (Type 4 armor-piercing bullet). The General Staff and the Inspector General of Education concluded, "Although it can penetrate the front of the M4 tank at 1000 m, the probability is small due to the angle of impact, and it is often necessary to attack the side and rear."

== Use ==
Intended Type 4 Chi-To production was 25 tanks per month spread over two Mitsubishi Heavy Industries factories. Late war shortage-induced delays resulted in only 6 chassis being built by 1945 and just two tanks were known to be completed. Neither of the completed tanks were used in combat prior to the end of the war in the Pacific.

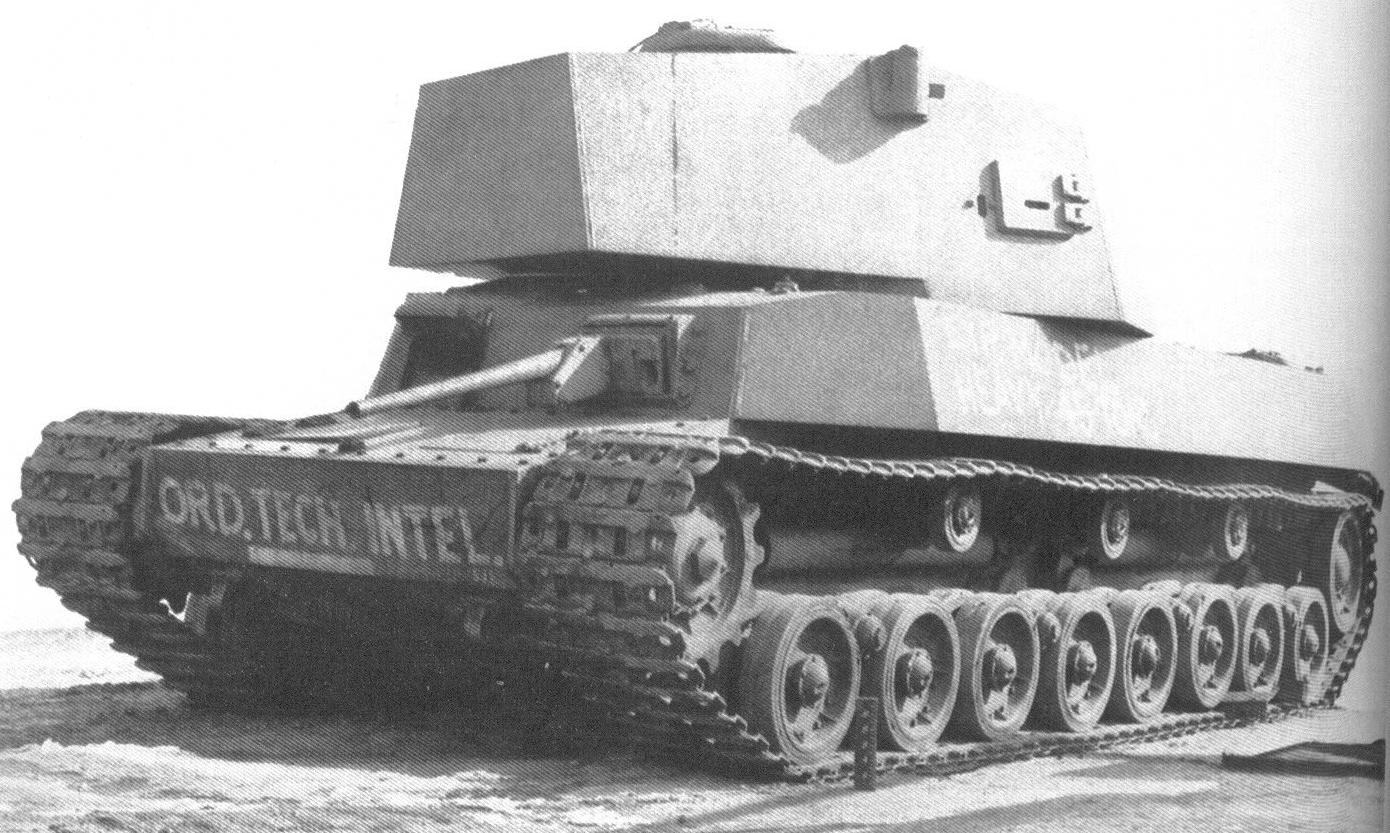
Incomplete prototype of the Type 5 Chi-Ri

The Type 5 75 mm tank gun was mounted into a prototype Type 5 Chi-Ri medium tank as its main gun. The Type 5 Chi-Ri used a lengthened version of the Type 4 Chi-To chassis and had thicker sloped welded armor. With the end of the Pacific War, an incomplete Type 5 prototype was seized by American forces during the occupation of Japan.

The prototype Type 5 Na-To tank destroyer also used the Type 5 75 mm tank gun as its main armament. Only two Type 5 Na-To units were completed by the surrender of Japan. Neither were used in combat.
