= Type 4 Chi-To medium tank =

Japanese medium tank prototype

Type 4 Chi-To
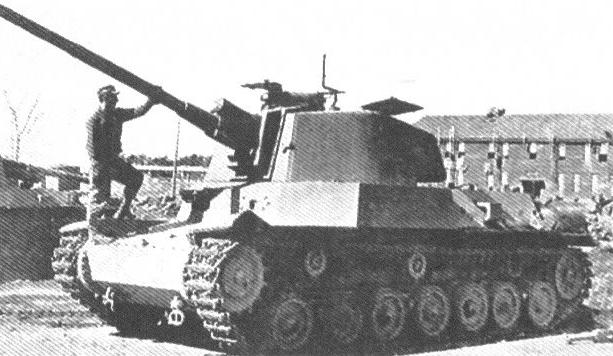
- Type 4 Chi-To medium tank
- Type: Medium tank
- Place of origin: Empire of Japan

Production history
- Designed: 1943–1944
- No. built: 2 (completed)

Specifications
- Mass: 30.48 tonnes (30.00 long tons; 33.60 short tons)
- Length: 6.42 m (21 ft 1 in)
- Width: 2.87 m (9 ft 5 in)
- Height: 2.87 m (9 ft 5 in)
- Crew: 5
- Armor: 12–75 millimetres (0.47–2.95 in)
- Main armament: Type 5 75 mm tank gun (L/56.4)
- Secondary armament: 2 × Type 97 heavy tank machine guns
- Engine: Mitsubishi AL Type 4 37.7 litre air-cooled V12 diesel engine with supercharger 400 hp at 2,000 rpm (13.73 hp/tonne)
- Suspension: bellcrank
- Operational range: 250 kilometres (160 mi)
- Maximum speed: 45 kilometres per hour (28 mph)

The Type 4 medium tank Chi-To (四式中戦車 チト, Yonshiki chūsensha Chi-To) ("Imperial Year 2604 Medium Tank Model 7") was one of several medium tanks developed by the Imperial Japanese Army towards the end of World War II. While by far the most advanced Japanese wartime tank to reach production, industrial and material shortages resulted in only a few chassis being manufactured and only two known to be completed. Neither of the completed Type 4 Chi-To tanks saw combat use.

== Design ==
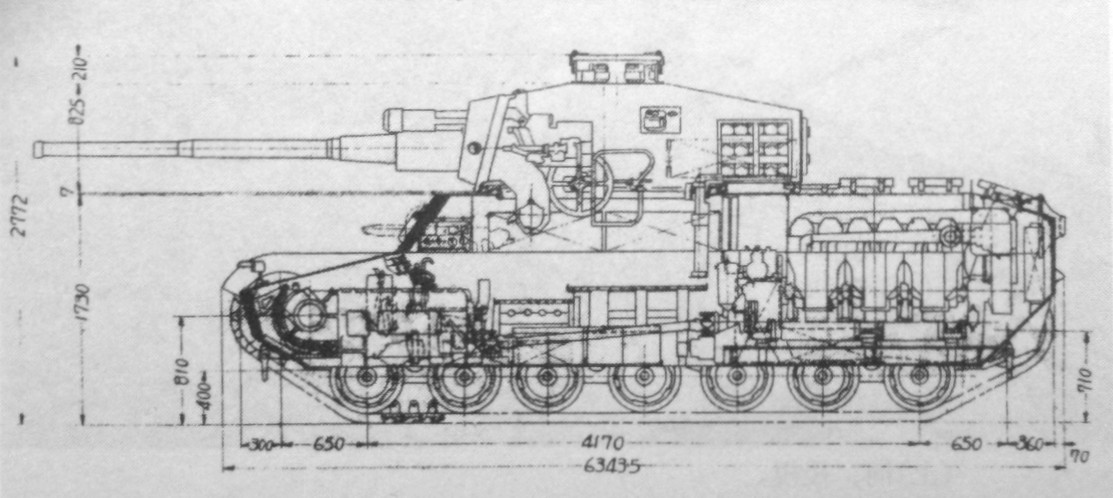
Interior side view of planned production model

The Type 4 Chi-To was a thirty-ton medium tank of all-welded construction and had maximum armor thickness of 75 mm (3.0 in) on the frontal plates. The turret was an enlarged variant of the one used on the Type 3 Chi-Nu medium tank and it carried a crew of five. The tank was 6.42 m (21.1 ft) long, 2.87 m (9 ft 5 in) high, and 2.87 m (9 ft 5 in) wide.

The main armament was a turret-mounted long-barreled (4.23 m) Type 5 75 mm tank gun capable of being elevated between -6.5 to +20 degrees. An 850 metres per second (2,800 ft/s) muzzle velocity gave it an armor penetration of 75 mm (3.0 in) at 1,000 m (3,300 ft). The tank had a Type 97 heavy tank machine gun mounted in the hull and a ball mount on the side of the turret for a second machine gun.

The Type 4's 400 hp (300 kW) diesel engine was significantly more powerful than the 180 kW (240 hp) engine of the Type 3 Chi-Nu, giving it a top speed of 45 km/h (28 mph) on tracks supported by seven road wheels on each side. The tank had a range of 250 km (160 mi).

== Development ==
Development of the Type 4 Chi-To began in 1943 as an intended successor to the Type 97-Kai Shinhoto Chi-Ha. The Army Technical Bureau had been working on the Type 4 Chi-To as the counter to the M4 Sherman, but there were problems and delays in the program. As a result, a stopgap tank was required. The Type 3 Chi-Nu medium tank was developed to cope with the M4 Sherman. Finally, the first prototype Type 4 Chi-To was delivered in 1944. Similar in its general layout, but significantly larger than the Type 97, it was the most advanced Japanese tank to reach the production stage.

Intended Type 4 Chi-To output was 25 tanks per month; with 20 to be made at Mitsubishi Heavy Industries and 5 to be produced at Kobe Seiko-sho. Late war shortage-induced delays caused by the severing of supply lines with conquered territories and U.S. strategic bombing of the Japanese mainland resulted in a total of six chassis being built. According to "The National Institute for Defense Studies, Ministry of Defense, Military Administration of Munitions Mobilization, Production Chart of January to April of 1945", the plan was to produce a total of 6 Type 4 Chi-To tanks in the first three months of 1945. Two Type 4 Chi-To tanks are known to have been completed in 1945 and neither saw combat.

At the end of World War II, two completed Type 4 Chi-To tanks were dumped into Lake Hamana in Shizuoka Prefecture to avoid capture by Allied occupation forces. One was recovered by the US Army, but the other was left in the lake. In 2013, there were efforts to locate the remaining tank, but it was not found.

== Ka-To self-propelled gun ==
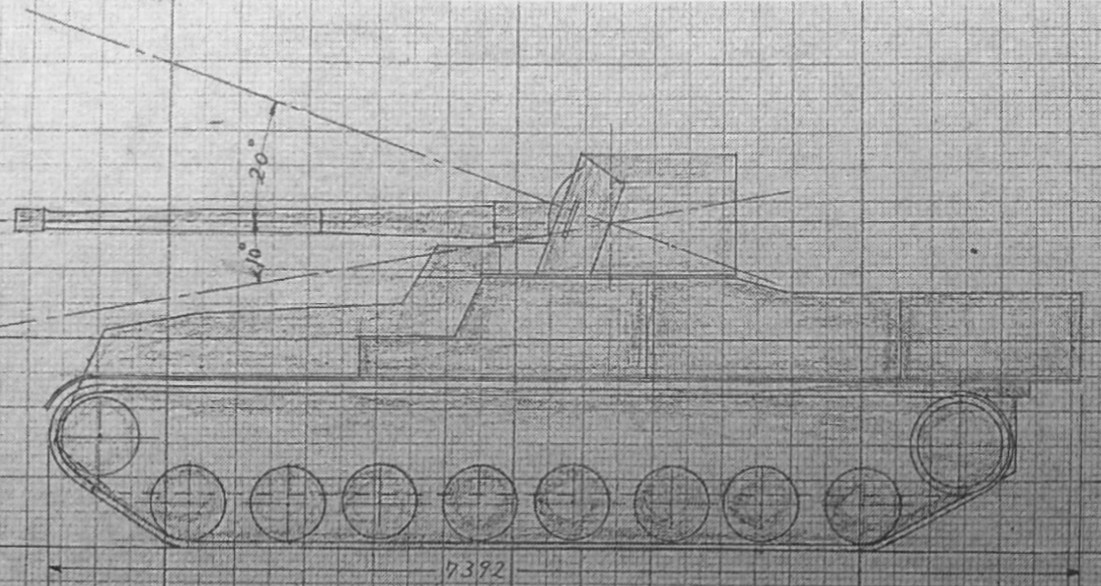
Drawing of Ka-To 105 mm SP AT gun

Another 105mm SP gun planned was the Ka-To 105 mm SP AT gun. The Ka-To's development was ordered in 1943. The engine placement was moved forward, while the gun placement was in the rear section of the hull. The open top superstructure was based on the Type 5 Na-To. Two main guns for the Ka-To were completed in 1945. According to several sources, the Ka-To hull was based on the Type 4 Chi-To, which needed to be extended in length to accommodate the main gun. An extra road wheel was added to each side of the chassis. However, according to another source, the incomplete Ka-To hull was based on the Type 5 Chi-Ri medium tank chassis.

== Tanks of comparable role, performance and era ==
- Soviet T-34-85
- German Panther
- British Comet
- American M4A1(76)

== Gallery ==
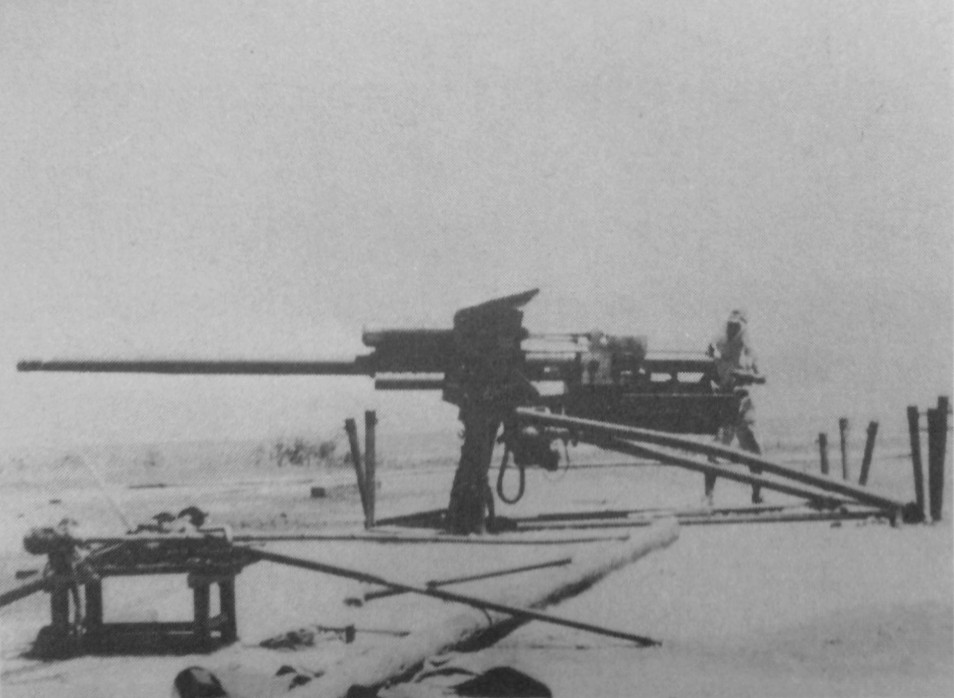
Type 5 75 mm tank gun Mark I

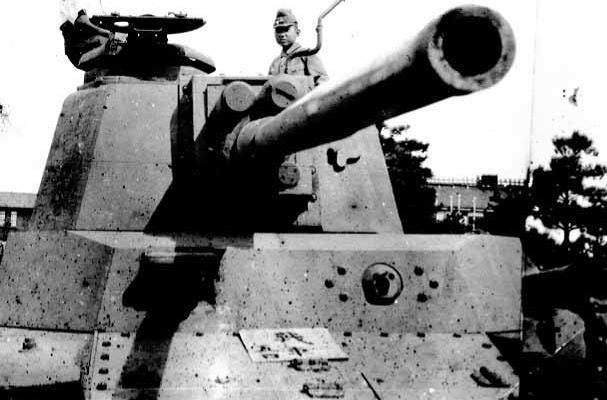
Front angle close-up of Type 4 Chi-To with turret-mounted Type 5 75 mm tank gun

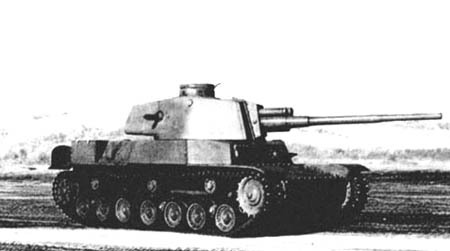
Type 4 Chi-To with ball-mounted machine gun on the turret

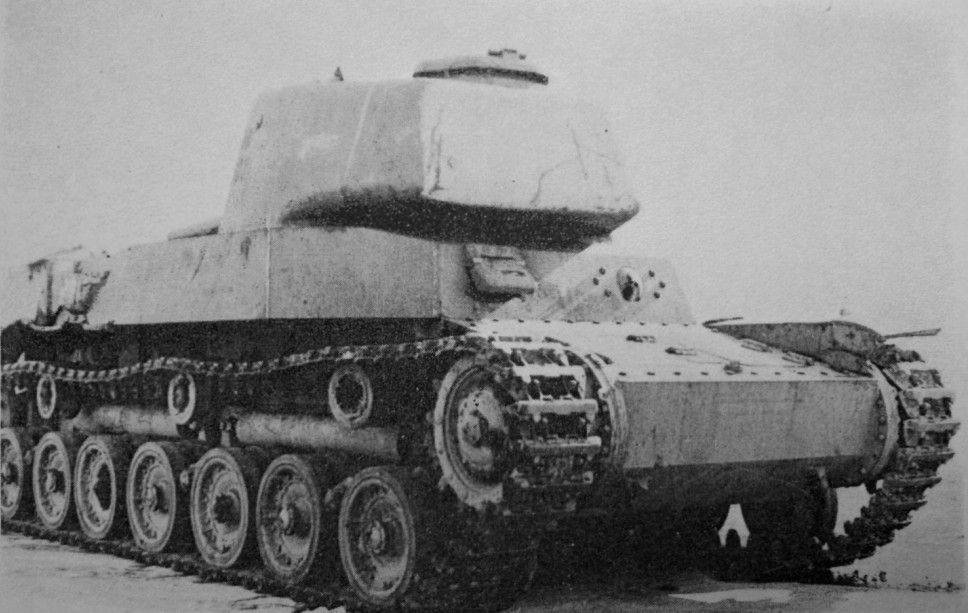
Type 4 Chi-To, with turret reversed

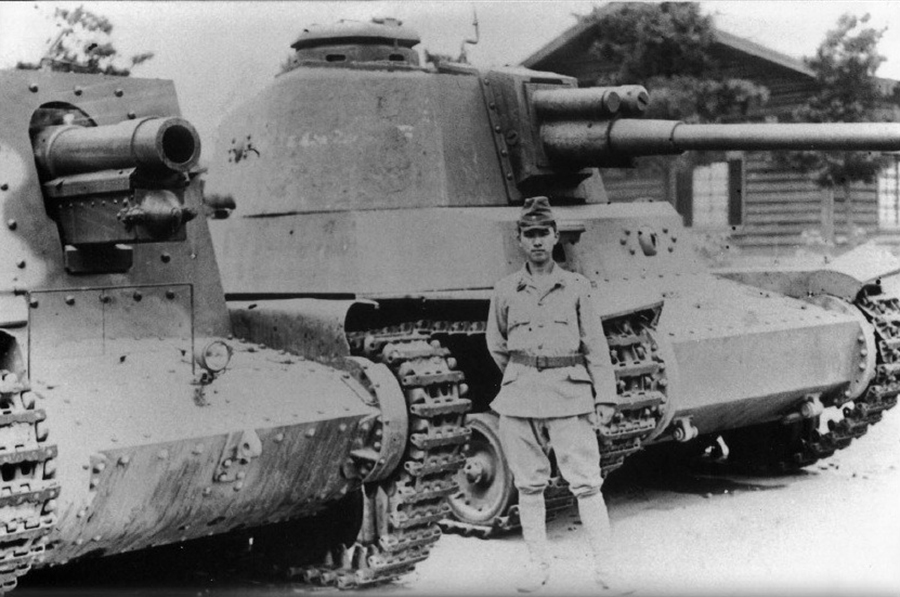
Front angle view of Type 4 Ho-Ro SPG and Type 4 Chi-To

== Sources ==
- Hara, Tomio (1972). Japanese Medium Tanks. AFV Weapons Profiles No. 49. Profile Publications Limited.
- Miller, David (2000). The Illustrated Directory of Tanks of the World. Zenith Imprint. ISBN 978-0-7603-0892-9.
- Tomczyk, Andrzej (2005). Japanese Armor Vol. 4. AJ Press. ISBN 978-8372371676.
- Tomczyk, Andrzej (2007). Japanese Armor Vol. 5. AJ Press. ISBN 978-8372371799.
- Zaloga, Steven J. (2007). Japanese Tanks 1939–45. Osprey. ISBN 978-1-8460-3091-8.
