= Type 1 47 mm anti-tank gun =

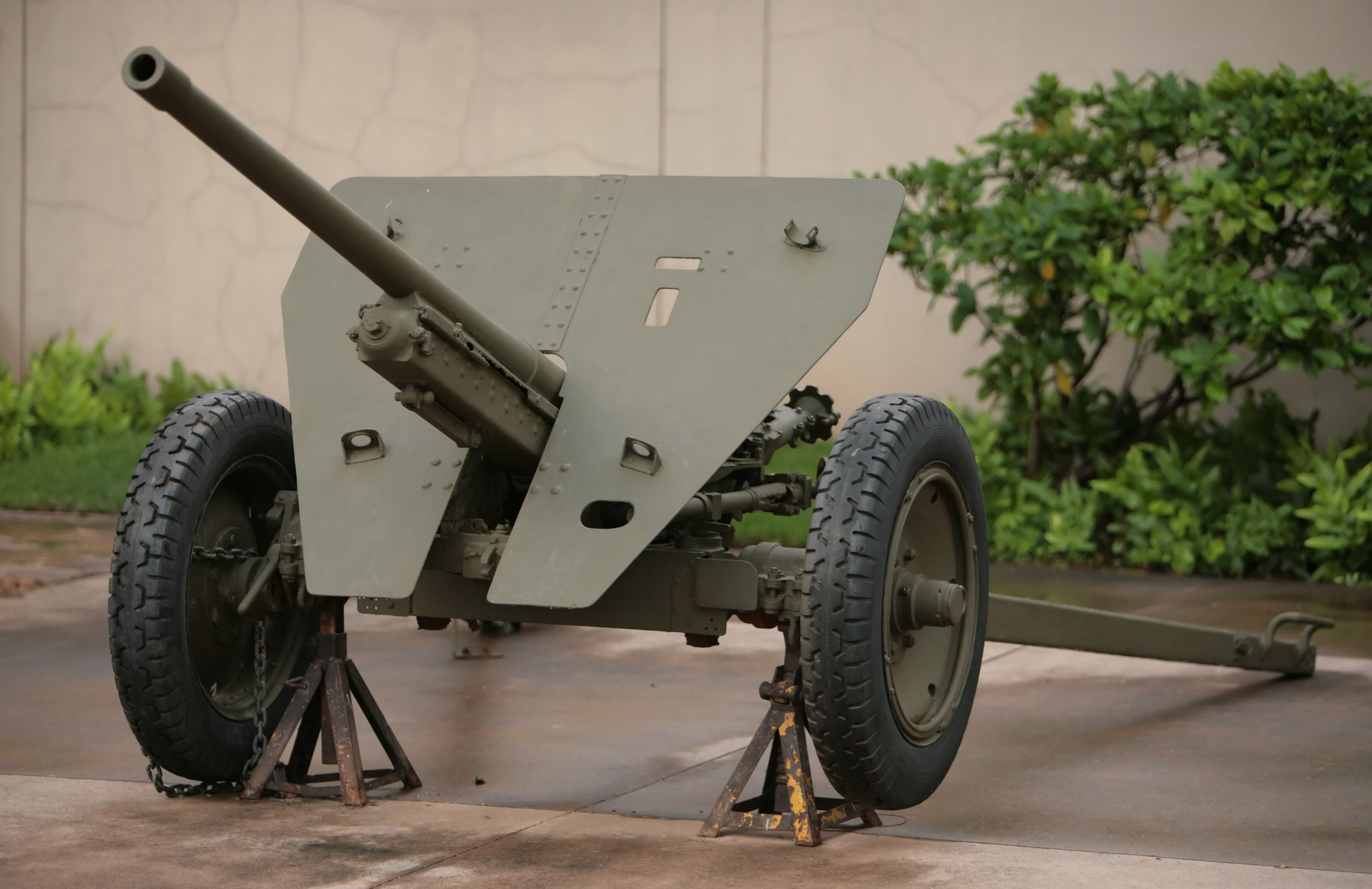
- Type 1 47 mm anti-tank gun at the U.S. Army Museum in Honolulu, Hawaii
- Type: Anti-tank gun
- Place of origin: Japan

Service history
- In service: 1942–1945
- Used by: Imperial Japanese Army
- Wars: Second World War

Production history
- Designed: c. 1939
- No. built: 2,300
- Variants: Main gun on the Type 97 Shinhoto Chi-Ha, Type 1 Chi-He and Type 3 Ka-Chi

Specifications
- Mass: 753 kg (1,660 lb)
- Barrel length: 2.53 m (8 ft 4 in) L/53.7
- Shell: 47×285mmR
- Shell weight: 1.4 kg (3 lb 1 oz)
- Caliber: 47 mm (1.85 in)
- Action: Breech loading
- Recoil: hydro-spring
- Carriage: Split-trail
- Elevation: -11° to +18°
- Traverse: 60°
- Muzzle velocity: 840 m/s (2,723 ft/s)
- Maximum firing range: 6,900 m (7,546 yds)
- Sights: Straight telescope

The Type 1 47 mm anti-tank gun (一式機動四十七粍速射砲, Isshiki Kidō yonjūnana-miri sokushahō, "Type 1 mobile 47 mm rapid-firing gun") was an anti-tank gun developed by the Imperial Japanese Army, and used in combat during World War II. The Type 1 47mm anti-tank gun was optimized for truck drawn operation. The Type 1 number was designated for the year the gun was accepted, 2601 in the Japanese imperial year calendar, or 1941 in the Gregorian calendar.

== History and development ==
The Type 1 47 mm anti-tank gun was accepted into service in 1942. The design originated as an improvement to the prototype “Experimental Type 97 (1937) 47 mm anti-tank gun” (試製九七式四十七粍速射砲), which was tested between 1938 and 1939. The prototype weighed 567 kilograms and had a barrel length of 2,515 mm, a traverse range of ±50 degrees and an elevation range of between minus 10 and plus 20 degrees, and a muzzle velocity of 730 m/s. The prototype was not accepted into service because it was considered to not have sufficient performance.

After the Nomonhan Incident, the Imperial Japanese Army started the development of a new anti-tank gun, considering that the Type 94 37 mm anti-tank gun would likely be ineffective against the new Soviet tanks. The design was the first completely indigenous anti-tank gun design completed in Japan, and production was assigned to the army's Osaka Arsenal. In terms of performance, the design was still inferior to advanced contemporary designs in western nations, but was considered suitable by the Imperial Japanese Army General Staff due to the anticipated lack of armor by the National Revolutionary Army of the Republic of China, and by the belief that Japan would face only light tanks fielded by the Allied nations in case of a more general war. Approximately 2,300 Type 1 47 mm AT guns were produced.

== Design ==
The Type 1 47 mm AT gun was a relatively modern design compared to other Japanese Second World war designs, being relatively light and easy to handle. As with many Japanese designs, it had a very low profile and was intended to be operated from a kneeling or prone position. The gun had a gun shield to protect the gunner. It used a semi-automatic breech block with a horizontal sliding wedge. When the gun was fired the spent shell casing was automatically ejected, and upon loading a fresh shell, the breech block closed automatically. A hydro-spring recoil mechanism was housed under the barrel. The weapon had a split trail which opened to an angle of 60 degrees for firing to improve stability. The gun was optimized for truck drawn operation. Transport was by towing, via the gun's two steel disc wheels fitted with "sponge-rubber-filled tires". The gun had an improvement in the time of flight of the shell. Time of flight to 600 meters range was reduced from one second for the 37 mm round to 0.8 of a second for the 47 mm round.

== Ammunition ==
The Type 1 had a performance comparably to those of contemporary guns of a similar caliber. Two types of shells were known to have been used with this ammunition, as follows:

=== Type 1 APHE shell ===
The APHE shell weighed 3.37 pounds (1.53 kg) and used a Mark 2 base fuse, the complete round weighing 6.1 pounds (2.8 kg). It had a small explosive charge of 0.04 pounds (18 g) consisting of RDX phlegmatized with 10% paraffin, which was able to consistently launch its shell at around 2,690 feet per second (820 m/s). The round also had a tracer.

Armor penetration of Type 1 APHE shell
Range	Penetration at 0°	Penetration at 30°
250 yards (230 m)	3 inches (76 mm)	2.25 inches (57 mm)
500 yards (460 m)	2.75 inches (70 mm)	2 inches (51 mm)
750 yards (690 m)	2.45 inches (62 mm)	1.7 inches (43 mm)
1,000 yards (910 m)	2 inches (51 mm)	1.4 inches (36 mm)
1,500 yards (1,400 m)	1.6 inches (41 mm)	1.2 inches (30 mm)

=== Type 1 HE shell ===
The HE shell weighed 3.08 pounds (1.40 kg) and used the Type 88 instantaneous or short delay fuse with a complete round weighing 5.4 pounds (2.4 kg). It contained 0.2 pounds (91 g) of explosive, consisting of a small block of picric acid and a larger block of TNT.

== Combat record ==
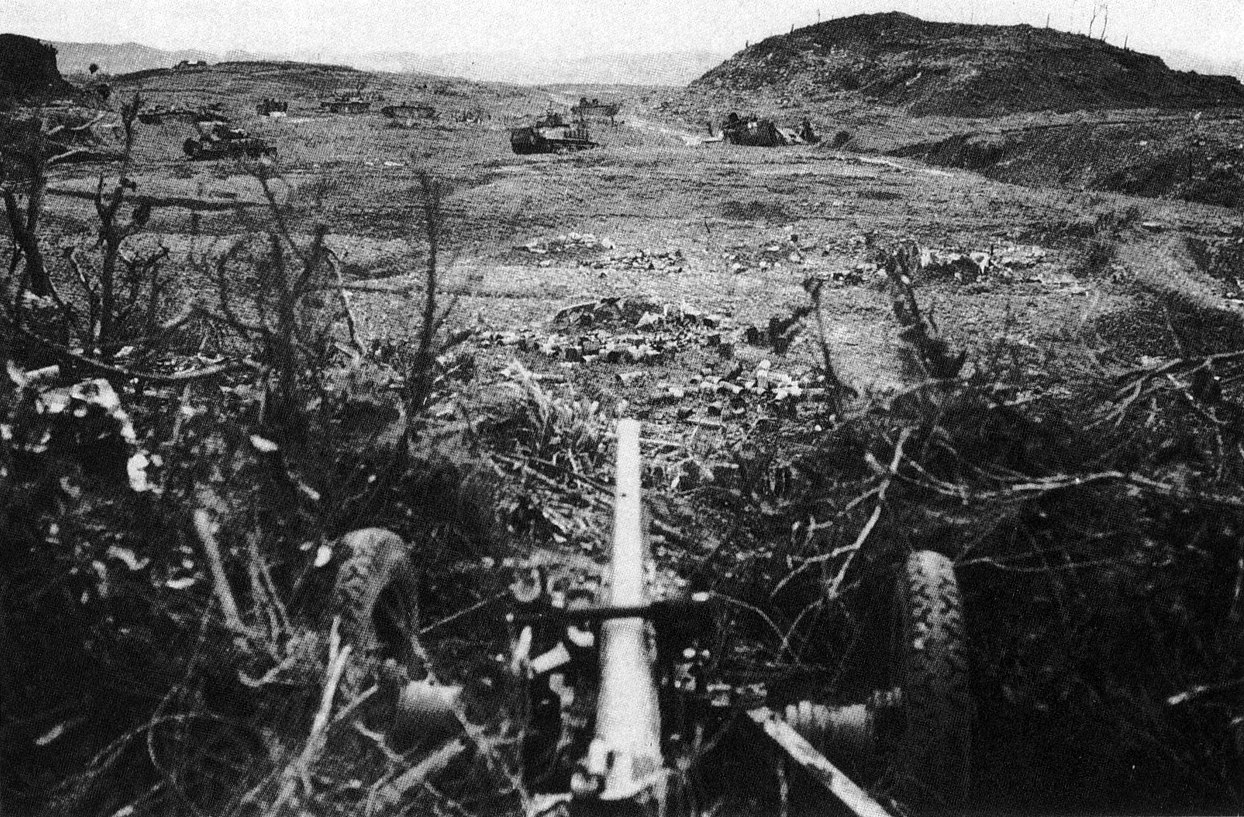
IJN Type 1 47 mm anti-tank gun overlooks the battlefield, littered with knocked-out M4 Shermans and LVTs, during the battle for the Sugar Loaf Hill (a part of the Battle of Okinawa)

The Type 1 47 mm AT gun was introduced to combat service in 1941, with the intent of it replacing the Type 94 37 mm (1.5 in) anti-tank gun. It was very effective for its role, with American personnel calling it "an excellent weapon, with mechanized carriage and a high muzzle-velocity" that "proved most effective in combat," though it was not always available in sufficient numbers. It had a high rate of fire and with AP shells was capable of perforating the front armor of the M4 medium tank at 800 yards (730 m), though standard doctrine was to wait until tanks got closer if possible to ensure good shot placement. The weaker APHE shell, while incapable of penetrating the M4 Medium's 93 mm (3.7 in) of effective front armor, could still penetrate the tank's side (38–45 mm (1.5–1.8 in)) of vertical armor), the most likely part of the tank to get hit, at a distance of more than a kilometre. It was issued to armored units as well as independent anti-tank units, and was fielded in a wide variety of areas, but most notably the Philippines and Okinawa, and continued to be used with diminishing effectiveness until the end of World War II.

After World War II the Type 1 47 mm AT gun was used in the Indonesian National Revolution by the Indonesian Army. In the Battle of Surabaya Dutch forces and British forces suffered moderate casualties among their convoy which consisted of M3 Stuarts and M4 Shermans.

== Type 1 47 mm tank gun ==
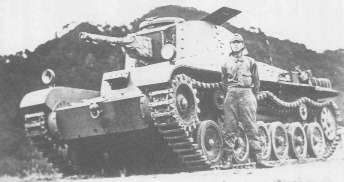
Type 1 Chi-He medium tank mounting the Type 1 47 mm tank gun

A variant known as the Type 1 47 mm tank gun was used as the main armament of the Type 97 Shinhoto Chi-Ha, Type 1 Chi-He, Type 3 Ka-Chi, and Type 5 Ke-Ho tanks. The tank gun differed from the anti-tank gun in that it incorporated a vertical sliding wedge. They each used the same HE and APHE ammunition. The tank gun had the following specifications:

- Calibre: 47 mm
- Barrel length: 2.250 m (7 ft 4.6 in) (L48)
- Elevation: -15 to +20 degrees
- AZ angle of fire: 20 degrees
- Muzzle velocity: 810 m/s (2,700 ft/s)
- Penetration: 55 mm (2.2 in) at 100 m (110 yd), 40 mm (1.6 in) at 500 m (550 yd), 30 mm (1.2 in) at 1,000 m (1,100 yd)

== Bibliography ==
- Bishop, Chris (eds) The Encyclopedia of Weapons of World War II. Barnes & Nobel. 1998. ISBN 0-7607-1022-8
- Chant, Chris. Artillery of World War II, Zenith Press, 2001, ISBN 0-7603-1172-2
- Foss, Christopher (2003). Tanks: The 500. Crestline. ISBN 0-7603-1500-0.
- McLean, Donald B. Japanese Artillery; Weapons and Tactics. Wickenburg, Ariz.: Normount Technical Publications 1973. ISBN 0-87947-157-3.
- Nakanishi, Ritta Japanese Infantry Arms in World War II, Dainipponkaiga Company 1991, ISBN 4-499-22690-2
- Ness, Leland (2014). Rikugun: Guide to Japanese Ground Forces, 1937-1945. Volume 2, Weapons of the Imperial Japanese Army & Navy Ground Force. Helion and Company. ISBN 978-1909982758.
- US Department of War, TM 30–480, Handbook on Japanese Military Forces, Louisiana State University Press, 1994. ISBN 0-8071-2013-8
- War Department TM-E-30-480 Handbook on Japanese Military Forces September 1944
