= Type 4 75 mm AA gun =

Type 4 75 mm anti-aircraft gun
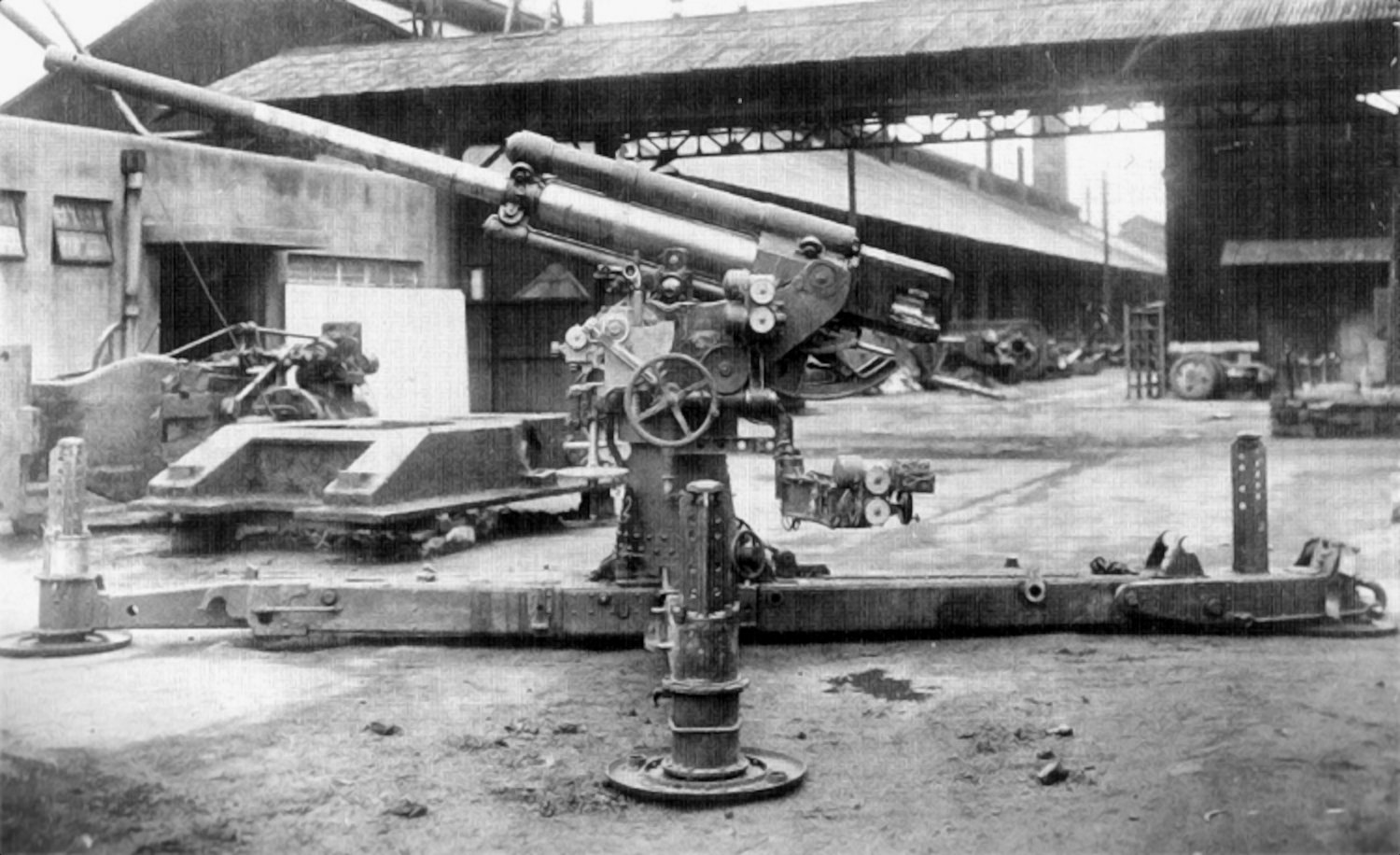
- Type 4 anti-aircraft gun.
- Type: Anti-aircraft gun
- Place of origin: Empire of Japan

Service history
- In service: 1944–1945
- Used by: Imperial Japanese Army
- Wars: World War II

Production history
- Designed: 1943
- No. built: 70

Specifications
- Mass: 5.85 tons
- Barrel length: 4.23 m (13 ft 11 in) L/56.4
- Caliber: 75 mm
- Elevation: -5 to +85 degrees
- Traverse: 360 Degrees
- Rate of fire: 10 rpm
- Muzzle velocity: 860 m/s (2,800 ft/s)
- Maximum firing range: 17,000 m (56,000 ft), 10,000 m (33,000 ft) max ceiling

The Type 4 75 mm AA gun (四式七糎半高射砲, Yon-shiki nanajyūgo-miri Koshahō) was an anti-aircraft gun developed by the Imperial Japanese Army. They started producing the gun in 1943. The Type 4 number was designated for the year the gun was accepted, 2604 in the Japanese imperial year calendar, or 1944 in the Gregorian calendar. Due to the lack of raw materials available and the great damage by air raids to its industrial infrastructure, only 70 units were made. These units were retained for defense of the Japanese home islands during World War II.

== History and development ==
In 1927, the Bofors company of Sweden had designed a new 75 mm AA gun which was purchased by the Royal Swedish Navy. This was developed into a mobile anti-aircraft gun with a carriage which had wheels, and was exported to the Republic of China, Persia, and Siam.

Japanese forces captured examples of the Bofors M29 75mm AA gun from the National Revolutionary Army of the Kuomintang government of China, and the Army Technical Bureau was impressed with its performance, which was much superior to the existing Japanese Type 88 75 mm AA Gun. By reverse engineering a close copy was designed and went into production in 1943. However, Japan lacked the raw materials and its industrial infrastructure was too damaged by air raids to follow through with mass production. Only 70 units were completed before the surrender of Japan.

The Type 5 75 mm tank gun was a variant design of the Type 4 75 mm AA gun used as the main armament on the Type 4 Chi-To medium tank.

== Design ==
The Type 4 75 mm AA gun had a single piece gun barrel with sliding breech, mounted on a central pedestal. The firing platform was supported by four legs, each of which had adjustable screwed foot for leveling.

== Combat record ==
Coming into service towards the end of the war, all seventy Type 4s that were operational were retained on the home islands as part of the bolstering of Japan's defenses against Allied air raids and against the perceived threat of Allied invasion.
