= Type 3 Ka-Chi =

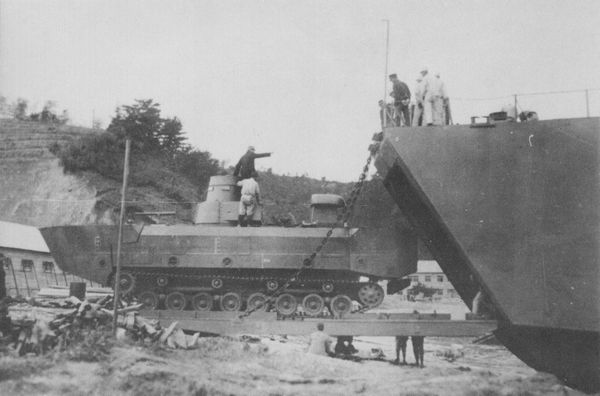
- Type 3 Ka-Chi
- Type: Amphibious tank
- Place of origin: Empire of Japan

Service history
- Used by: Imperial Japanese Navy

Production history
- Designed: 1942–1943
- Produced: 1943–1945
- No. built: 12 to 19

Specifications
- Mass: 28.7 tons (with flotation pontoons)
- Length: 10.3 m (with flotation pontoons)
- Width: 3 m
- Height: 3.82 m
- Crew: 7
- Armor: 10–50 mm
- Main armament: Type 1 47 mm tank gun
- Secondary armament: 2× Type 97 7.7 mm machine guns
- Engine: Mitsubishi Type 100 air-cooled V-12 diesel 240 hp (179 kW)
- Power/weight: 8.4 hp/tonne
- Suspension: bellcrank
- Operational range: 320 km
- Maximum speed: 32 km/h (land); 10 km/h (swimming)

The "special amphibious tank Type 3 Ka-Chi" (特三式内火艇 カチ, Toku-san-shiki naikatei Ka-Chi) was an amphibious medium tank developed by the Imperial Japanese Navy in World War II. The Type 3 Ka-Chi was based on an extensively modified Imperial Japanese Army Type 1 Chi-He medium tank (it had 2 more road-wheels and two more return rollers on each side) and was a larger and more capable version of the earlier Type 2 Ka-Mi amphibious tank.

== History and development ==
The success of the Type 2 Ka-Mi design pleased the planners in the Imperial Japanese Navy General Staff, and it was determined that a larger version with stronger armor and armament would be useful in future amphibious warfare operations. The Type 3 Ka-Chi prototype was completed in late 1943 and the first units entered service that same year.

Only 12 to 19 Type 3 Ka-Chi's were built from 1943 to 1945. This was due to the fact that the main priorities of the Japanese Navy were in warship and aircraft production, and lacking in any definite plans for additional amphibious operations, production of the Type 3 Ka-Chi remained a very low priority.

== Design ==
The Type 3 Ka-Chi was based on a heavily modified version of the chassis of the army's Type 1 Chi-He medium tank, and thus featured considerably better armored protection and firepower than the earlier Type 2 Ka-Mi. It had smooth sides that faired into front and rear flotation pontoons made of sheet-metal. The front pontoon had a curved 'bow' shape and both pontoons could be jettisoned from inside the tank once the tank had landed. However, in practice, the pontoons were usually retained, as they provided some marginal additional protection against enemy fire. The undercarriage used the Hara system, with the addition of 2 more road-wheels and two more return rollers on each side than the Type 1 Chi-He. The hull was welded and water-proofed "with rubber seals and gaskets". The water propulsion was provided by twin-screws and it had two steering screws. The Type 3 Ka-Chi had a distinctive large snorkel behind the turret for aerating the diesel engine more efficiently and keeping the exhaust free of water.

The main gun of Type 3 Ka-Chi was the Type 1 47 mm tank gun with a barrel length of 2.250 meters (L/48), EL angle of fire by −15 to +20 degrees, AZ angle of fire of 20 degrees, muzzle velocity by 810 m/s and penetration of 55 mm/100 m, 40 mm/500 m, and 30 mm/1,000 m. This was the same 47 mm gun used on the army's Type 97 Shinhoto Chi-Ha. Secondary armament was a coaxial Type 97 heavy tank machine gun and a hull mounted weapon of the same type. The gun turret was designed with an extended circular cupola to keep the hatch above water. The vehicle required a crew of seven, one of whom (as with the Type 2 Ka-Mi) served as an on-board mechanic.

The Type 3 Ka-Chi was produced in very limited numbers. It was designed to be launched from a submarine, a capability intended to accommodate the increasingly difficult task of daytime reinforcement for isolated island garrisons located in the South Pacific and Southeast Asia. However, the Type 3 Ka-Chi was ultimately deployed only in the Japan homeland and did not see combat.

== See also ==
- DD tank - World War II British tank flotation system.
- T-38 - World War II, Soviet amphibious light tank.
