= List of armoured fighting vehicles of World War II =

The List of armoured fighting vehicles of World War II lists military armoured vehicles that were in service or constructed during World War II. This includes prototypes, vehicles produced by neutral countries and vehicles that were not used in combat. AFV projects that were not constructed are omitted, as are un-armoured vehicles. In parentheses are shown the number of vehicles produced, where known, and the countries in which they were constructed.

== See also ==
- List of equipment used in World War II
- List of armoured fighting vehicles
- List of World War II military vehicles by country
- List of prototype World War II combat vehicles

== 0–9 ==
- 7TP light tank (132; Poland)
- 10TP prototype light cruiser tank (~1; Poland)
- 10.5 cm K (gp.Sfl.) prototype self-propelled gun 'Dicker Max' (2; Germany)
- 14TP prototype medium cruiser tank (~1; Poland)

== A ==
- Achilles tank destroyer based on M10 (1,100; United Kingdom & USA)
- AB md. 1941 prototype armoured car (~1; Romania)
- ADGZ (Steyr) armoured car (52; Austria & Germany)
- AEC armoured car (629; United Kingdom)
- AEC armoured command vehicle (415; United Kingdom)
- AH-IV tankette (157; Czechoslovakia)
- Alecto experimental self-propelled gun, projected terminated with the end of the war. (United Kingdom)
- AMC 34 light tank (12; France)
- AMC 35 cavalry tank (ACG1 in Belgian service) (57+; France)
- AMC Schneider P 16 armoured halftrack ("AMC Citroën-Kégresse Modèle 1929") (100; France)
- AMR 33 light tank (123; France)
- AMR 35 light tank (167; France)
- Antonov A-40 KT prototype flying tank using T-60 (1; Soviet Union)
- Archer "SP 17pdr, Valentine, Mk.I" self-propelled anti-tank gun (655; United Kingdom)
- Armadillo armoured lorry used for home defence (877; United Kingdom)
- Armoured Carrier Wheeled Indian Pattern scout car (4,655; India)
- Arsenal Crossley armoured car (13; Estonia)
- Autoblindo 40 armoured car (24; Italy)
- Autoblindo 41 armoured car (550; Italy)
- Avenger "SP 17pdr, A30 (Avenger)" tank destroyer, not used until after the war (<80; United Kingdom)

== B ==
- BA-3 and BA-6 armoured cars (566; Soviet Union)
- BA-10 armoured car (3,311; Soviet Union)
- BA-11 armoured car (18; Soviet Union)
- BA-20 armoured car (4,800; Soviet Union)
- BA-21 prototype armoured car (Soviet Union)
- BA-27 armoured car (215; Soviet Union)
- BA-30 prototype half-tracked armoured car (Soviet Union)
- BA-64 armoured car (9,110; Soviet Union)
- BA-I armoured car (82; Soviet Union)
- Badger flamethrower version of the Ram tank (Canada)
- Bedford OXA improvised armoured car built on heavy truck chassis (948; United Kingdom)
- Bishop "Carrier, Valentine, 25pdr gun Mk.I" self-propelled artillery (100; United Kingdom)
- Bison improvised armoured lorry as mobile pillbox (~2-300; United Kingdom)
- Borgward IV Sd.Kfz. 301 demolition vehicle (1181; Germany)
- Black Prince "Tank, Infantry (A43)", prototype infantry tank with 17 pdr gun (6; United Kingdom)
- Bob Semple tank prototype (4; New Zealand)
- BT Series of fast tanks (8,060; Soviet Union)
- BT-42 assault gun (18; Finland)

== C ==
- C7P artillery tractor (151; Poland)
- C15TA armoured truck (3,960; Canada)
- Calliope (T34) rocket launcher on M4 Sherman tank (USA)
- Carden Loyd tankettes (450; United Kingdom)
- Carro Armato M Celere Sahariano prototype cruiser tank (1; Italy)
- Char 2C super heavy tank FCM2C (10; France)
- Char B1 heavy tank Renault (405; France)
- Char D1 medium tank Renault (150; France)
- Char D2 medium tank Renault (100; France)
- Chenilette Renault UE light carrier (5,168; France)
- Chiyoda armored car (~200; Japan)
- Churchill tank, Infantry, Mk IV (A22) (7,368; United Kingdom)
- Cockatrice armoured airfield defence flamethrower (66; United Kingdom)
- Coventry armoured car (283; United Kingdom)
- Crossley-Chevrolet armoured car (United Kingdom)
- Cruiser Mk I (A9) (125; United Kingdom)
- Cruiser Mk II (A10) (175; United Kingdom)
- Cruiser Mk III (A13) (65; United Kingdom)
- Cruiser Mk IV (A13 Mk.II) (655; United Kingdom)
- Cruiser, Mk V Covenanter (A13 Mk.III) (1,771; United Kingdom) (Never used in combat)
- Cruiser, Mk VI Crusader (A15) (5,300; United Kingdom)
- Cruiser, Mk VII Cavalier (A24) (500; United Kingdom)
- Cruiser, Mk VIII Centaur (A27L) (950; United Kingdom)
- Cruiser, Mk VIII Cromwell (A27M) (3,066; United Kingdom)
- Cruiser Mk VIII Challenger (A30) (200; United Kingdom)
- Cruiser, Comet I (A34) (1,186; United Kingdom)
- Centurion tank (6 operational by end World War II; United Kingdom) (not used in World War II combat)
- Csaba (39M & 40M) armoured car (~100; Hungary)
- Cultivator No. 6 prototype armoured trench digging machine (United Kingdom)
- CV-33 tankette (760; Italy)
- CV-35 tankette (1,740; Italy)

== D ==
- D-8 and D-12 armoured cars (50; Soviet Union)
- Daimler armoured car (2,694; United Kingdom)
- Daimler Dingo scout car (6,626; United Kingdom & Canada)
- Deacon armoured lorry self-propelled anti-tank gun (175; United Kingdom)
- Diana Sd.Kfz 6/3 converted half track tank destroyer (9; Germany)
- Dicker Max - see 10.5 cm K (gp.Sfl.)
- Dingo scout car (245; Australia)
- Dodge Mk VII and Mk VIII armoured car (5; Ireland)

== E ==
- Excelsior tank heavy tank prototype (2; United Kingdom)

== F ==
- FAI armoured car (636; Soviet Union)
- FCM 36 light tank (100; France)
- Ferdinand/Elefant heavy tank destroyer (91; Germany)
- Fiat 3000 (L5/21 and L5/30) light tank derived from the Renault FT (200; Italy)
- Flamingo (popular name for the PzKpfw II Flamm)
- Flakpanzer I self-propelled anti-aircraft gun (24; Germany)
- Flakpanzer 38(t) self-propelled anti-aircraft gun (141; Germany)
- Ford Mk IV armoured car (7; Ireland)
- Ford Mk V armoured car (14; Ireland)
- Ford Mk VI armoured car (28; Ireland)
- Fox armoured car (1,506; Canada)

== G ==
- Goliath tracked mine un-manned demolition vehicle (7,564; Germany)
- Grille heavy infantry gun on Pz38(t) chassis (383; Germany)
- Grizzly I cruiser Canadian-built M4 Sherman (188; Canada)
- Guy armoured car (101; United Kingdom)
- Guy Lizard armoured command vehicle (21; United Kingdom)

== H ==
- Heuschrecke 10 (Waffentrager) prototype dismountable self-propelled gun (3; Germany)
- Hillman Gnat prototype light armoured car (4; United Kingdom)
- Hotchkiss H35 and H39 light tanks (~1200; France)
- Humber armoured car (3,652; United Kingdom)
- Humber light reconnaissance car (3,600+; United Kingdom)
- Humber scout car (4,100+; United Kingdom)
- Hummel Panzer Feldhaubitze 18M self-propelled artillery (864; Germany)

== I ==
- IS-1 "Joseph Stalin" heavy tank (107, converted to IS-2 before issuing; Soviet Union)
- IS-2 heavy tank (3,854; Soviet Union)
- IS-3 heavy tank (2,311 tanks produced until mid 1946, probably never used in combat during World War II; Soviet Union)
- ISU-122 heavy self-propelled gun (2,380; Soviet Union)
- ISU-152 heavy self-propelled gun (3,242; Soviet Union)

== J ==
- Jagdpanzer 38(t) "Hetzer" tank destroyer (~2,827; Germany)
- Jagdpanzer IV tank destroyer (1,988+; Germany)
- Jagdpanzer V "Jagdpanther" tank destroyer (392; Germany)
- Jagdpanzer VI "Jagdtiger" heavy tank destroyer (~80; Germany)
- Joseph Stalin tank - see IS-1 IS-2 IS-3

== K ==
- Kangaroo armoured personnel carrier variant of the Ram tank (100+; Canada), M4 Sherman, M7 Priest and other vehicles.
- KhTZ-16 improvised light tank (60; Soviet Union)
- KP-bil armoured personnel carrier (500; Sweden)
- Komsomolets armoured tractor (T-20) (4,401; Soviet Union)
- Kubuś improvised armoured car (1; Poland)
- Kugelblitz prototype self-propelled antiaircraft gun (2-6; Germany)
- Kugelpanzer prototype ball-shaped armoured vehicle (1; Germany)
- KV-1 heavy tank (5,219+; Soviet Union)
- KV-2 heavy artillery tank (255; Soviet Union)
- KV variants and prototypes (93+; Soviet Union)
- KV-85 heavy tank (148; Soviet Union)

== L ==
- L6/40 light tank (283; Italy)
- Laffly S15 TOE scout car (45; France)
- Lanchester 6×4 armoured car (38; United Kingdom)
- Lancia IZM armoured car (120; Italy)
- Landing Vehicle Tracked LVT(A)1,2,4,5 armoured Amtracs (3,119; USA)
- Landsverk L-60 (Strv m/38-40) light tanks (219; Sweden)
- Landsverk L-100 prototype light tank (Sweden)
- Landsverk L-120 prototype light tank (2; Sweden)
- Landsverk L-180, L-181 and L-182 armoured car (48; Sweden)
- Landsverk L-185 prototype armoured car (1; Sweden)
- Leichttraktor prototype light tank (4; Germany)
- Leyland armoured car (4; Ireland)
- Leyland Beaver-Eel armoured lorry (336; United Kingdom)
- Light Tank Mk I (9 or 10; United Kingdom)
- Light Tank Mk II (66; United Kingdom)
- Light Tank Mk III (42; United Kingdom)
- Light Tank Mk IV (34; United Kingdom)
- Light Tank Mk V (22; United Kingdom)
- Light Tank Mk.VI (1,682; United Kingdom)
- Light Tank Mk VII light/airborne tank commonly known as the Tetrarch tank (177; United Kingdom)
- Light Tank Mk VIII Harry Hopkins (100; United Kingdom)
- Lince scout car Autoblindo scout car (250; Italy)
- Lorraine 37L tracked carrier (~630; France)
- Loyd Carrier personnel carrier (26,000; United Kingdom)
- LT vz. 34 light tank (51; Czechoslovakia)
- LT vz. 35 (Czech Army designation for the Skoda S-11 / Panzer 35(t)) (434; Czechoslovakia)
- LT vz. 38 (Czech Army designation for the CKD TNH-PS / Panzer 38(t)) (1,414; Czechoslovakia)
- Luchs (popular name for the Ausf L version of the Panzer II)
- Luftvärnskanonvagn L-62 Anti II self-propelled anti-aircraft gun (6; Sweden)
- Lynx armoured car, Pansarbil m/39 and m/40 (~48; Sweden)

== M ==
- M1 combat car light tank (113; USA)
- M2 half-track car personnel carrier, also M9 version and other variants (17,000; USA)
- M2 light tank (696; USA)
- M2 medium tank (112; USA) (not used in combat)
- M3/M5 Stuart light tank (22,743; USA)
- M3 half-track personnel carrier, also M5 version and other variants (~43,000; USA)
- M3 Lee / Grant medium tank (6,258; USA)
- M3 scout car (20,918; USA)
- M3 GMC 75 mm gun motor carriage (2,202; USA)
- M4 Sherman medium tank (49,234; USA)
- M6 heavy tank (40; USA) (never saw combat)
- M7 Priest 105 mm howitzer motor carriage (3,940; USA)
- M7 medium tank prototypes (13; USA)
- M8 Greyhound armoured car (8,523; USA)
- M8 Scott 75 mm howitzer motor carriage (1,778; USA)
- M10 tank destroyer, 3-inch gun motor carriage, tank destroyer (6,706; USA)
- M11/39 medium tank (100; Italy)
- M12 155 mm gun motor carriage (100; USA)
- M13 multiple gun motor carriage half-tracked AA gun (1103; USA)
- M13/40 medium tank (779; Italy)
- M14/41 medium tank (939; Italy)
- M15 combination gun motor carriage half-tracked AA gun (2332; USA)
- M15/42 medium tank (118; Italy)
- M16 multiple gun motor carriage half tracked AA gun (3550; USA)
- M18 Hellcat 76 mm gun motor carriage (2,507; USA)
- M20 armored utility car (3,791; USA)
- M19 multiple gun motor carriage self-propelled AA gun (285; USA)
- M22 Locust airborne light tank (830; USA)
- M24 Chaffee light tank (4,731; USA)
- M25 Dragon Wagon armoured tank transporter (M26 armoured tractor) (1300+; USA)
- M26 Pershing heavy tank (1,400+; USA)
- M36 tank destroyer 90 mm gun motor carriage, tank destroyer (1,413; USA)
- M38 Wolfhound prototype armoured car (USA)
- M39 Pantserwagen DAF armoured car (12; Netherlands)
- M39 armored utility vehicle converted from M18 Hellcat (650; USA)
- M40 GMC 155 mm gun motor carriage (311; USA)
- M43 howitzer motor carriage (48; USA)
- M1917 light tank (952; USA) obsolete pre-war vehicles purchased by Canada for training.
- Maeda Ku-6 prototype flying tank (1; Japan)
- Marder I tank destroyer (170; Germany)
- Marder II self-propelled 75 mm antitank gun on a Panzer II chassis (651; Germany)
- Marder III tank destroyer (1,756; Germany)
- Mareşal tank destroyer prototype (7; Romania)
- Marmon–Herrington armoured car (5,746; South Africa)
- Marmon–Herrington CTLS light tank (875; USA, used by Royal Netherlands East Indies Army, and for training by Australia)
- Matilda Mk I tank, infantry, Mk I (A11) (140; United Kingdom)
- Matilda II tank, infantry, Mk II (A12) (2,987; United Kingdom)
- Panzerwerfer 42 auf Maultier, Sd.Kfz. 4/1 armoured rocket launcher version (~300; Germany)
- Maus (tank) prototype super-heavy tank (2; Germany)
- Möbelwagen self-propelled anti-aircraft gun (<300; Germany)
- Morris CS9 light armoured car (100; United Kingdom)
- Morris light reconnaissance car (2,200+; United Kingdom)
- Morris Mk IV armoured car (1; Ireland)
- MKE kırıkkale 1943 (1 prototype;turkiye)

== N ==
- Nahuel medium tank (16; Argentina)
- Nashorn (Hornisse) tank destroyer (473; Germany)
- Neubaufahrzeug prototype tanks (5; Germany)
- NI Tank improvised tank (68; Soviet Union)
- Nimrod (40M) self-propelled anti-aircraft gun (135; Hungary)
- NKL-26 armoured aerosan (Soviet Union)

== O ==
- OA vz. 27 armoured car (16; Czechoslovakia)
- OA vz. 30 armoured car (52; Czechoslovakia)
- O-I super-heavy tank prototype (1; Japan)
- Ostwind Flakpanzer IV self-propelled antiaircraft gun (45; Germany)
- Otter Light Reconnaissance Car (1,761; Canada)

== P ==
- P-40 heavy tank (Carro Pesante P26/40) (103; Italy)
- Panhard 178 armoured car (1,143; France)
- Panzer I light tank (1,893; Germany)
- Panzer II light tank (1,856; Germany)
- Panzer III medium tank (5,774; Germany)
- Panzer IV medium tank (8,509; Germany)
- Panzer V Panther medium tank (6,132; Germany)
- Panzer VI E Tiger I heavy tank (1,355; Germany) (i)
- Panzer VI B Tiger II heavy tank (487; Germany)
- Panzer 35(t) (German designation for the LT-35)
- Panzer 38(t) (German designation for the LT-38)
- Panzerjäger I light tank destroyer (202; Germany)
- Panzer-Selbstfahrlafette II prototype halftrack tank destroyer (2; Germany)
- PPG tankette (~100, Soviet Union)

== R ==
- R-1 prototype tankette (1; Romania)
- Ram medium tank (2,993; Canada)
- Renault FT light tank (1,700+; France)
- Renault R 35 light infantry tank (1,500; France)
- Renault R40 light infantry tank (185; France)
- Rhino heavy armoured car prototype (2; Australia)
- Rolls-Royce armoured car (76+; United Kingdom)
- Rover light armoured car not used in combat (238; Australia)
- RSO/PAK 40 self-propelled anti-tank gun (60; Germany)

== S ==
- S1 Scout Car (~40; Australia)
- Samochód pancerny wz. 29 armoured car (10-13; Poland)
- Samochód pancerny wz. 34 armoured car (~80; Poland)
- Schofield tank light tank prototype (1; New Zealand)
- Schwere Wehrmachtschlepper armoured halftrack (825, including unarmoured version; Germany)
- Sd.Kfz. 7 armoured anti-aircraft variants (Germany)
- Sd.Kfz. 221/222/223 series of light armoured cars (~3,340; Germany)
- Sd.Kfz. 231/232/233/234/263 series of heavy armoured cars (~1,800; Germany)
- Sd.Kfz. 247 armoured command car (68; Germany)
- Sd.Kfz. 250 (plus 252 & 253) armoured halftrack (13,000 +; Germany)
- Sd.Kfz. 251 armoured halftrack (Models A, B and C: 4,650. Model D: 10,602; Germany)
- Sd.Kfz. 254 track/wheel scout car (140; Austria & Germany)
- Semovente 47/32 self-propelled gun (~300; Italy)
- Semovente 75/18 self-propelled gun (262; Italy)
- Semovente 75/34 self-propelled gun (192; Italy)
- Semovente 75/46 self-propelled gun (15; Italy & Germany)
- Semovente 90/53 self-propelled gun (48; Italy)
- Semovente 105/25 self-propelled gun (90; Italy)
- Semovente da 149/40 prototype self-propelled gun (1; Italy)
- Sentinel tank Australian Cruiser Tank Mk. 1 (65; Australia)
- Şeniletă Malaxa Tip UE prime mover/light carrier (towing tractor) (126; Romania)
- Sexton self-propelled howitzer (2,150; Canada)
- Sherman Firefly medium tank (~2,200; United Kingdom & USA)
- sIG33 auf Panzer I heavy infantry gun on Pz I chassis (38; Germany)
- sIG33 auf Panzer II heavy infantry gun on Pz II chassis (12; Germany)
- Skink anti-aircraft tank prototype (3; Canada)
- SMK tank heavy tank prototype (1; Soviet Union)
- SOMUA S35 tank (430; France)
- Special number 3 light tank Ku-Ro prototype glider tank (1 mockup; Japan)
- Springer demolition vehicle Sd.Kfz.304 (~50; Germany)
- Standard Beaverette armoured car (~2,800; United Kingdom, New Zealand)
- Stormartillerivagn m/43 assault gun (36; Sweden)
- Stridsvagn m/21 light tank (10; Sweden)
- Stridsvagn m/31 light tank (3; Sweden)
- Stridsvagn m/35 (Swedish designation for licence built LT-35)
- Stridsvagn m/37 light tank (48; Sweden)
- Stridsvagn m/38, m/39, m/40 or Strv L-60 - see Landsverk L-60
- Stridsvagn m/41 tank (238; Sweden)
- Stridsvagn m/42 tank (282; Sweden)
- StuG III assault gun (10,619; Germany)
- StuG IV assault gun (1,139; Germany)
- StuIG 33B assault gun (24; Germany)
- Sturer Emil prototype self-propelled anti-tank gun (2; Germany)
- Sturmmörser Tiger heavy assault gun (18; Germany)
- Sturmpanzer IV Brummbär Sd.Kfz.166, assault gun (306; Germany)
- ST vz. 39 prototype medium tank (2; Czechoslovakia)
- SU-14 heavy self-propelled gun (2; Soviet Union)
- SU-76 self-propelled gun (14,292; Soviet Union)
- SU-85 tank destroyer (2,050; Soviet Union)
- SU-100 tank destroyer (2,495; Soviet Union)
- SU-100Y prototype self-propelled gun (1; Soviet Union)
- SU-122 self-propelled gun (1,150; Soviet Union)
- SU-152 heavy self-propelled gun (671; Soviet Union)
- Sumida M.2593 armoured car (1000; Japan)

== T ==
- T-1 prototype prime mover/artillery towing tractor (5; Romania)
- T13 tankette (200; Belgium)
- T14 heavy tank prototype (2; USA)
- T15 tankette. (42+; Belgium)
- T17 Deerhound armoured car (250 USA)
- T17E1 Staghound armoured car (~3,800; USA)
- T18 Boarhound armoured car (30; USA)
- T18 howitzer motor carriage prototype (2; USA)
- T19 howitzer motor carriage half-track SP gun (324; USA)
- T20 medium tank series of prototypes (301; USA)
- T27 armored car prototype (2; USA)
- T28 super-heavy tank prototype, also called T95 GMC (2; USA)
- T29 heavy tank prototype (6; USA)
- T30 heavy tank prototype (2; USA)
- T40/M9 tank destroyer prototype (USA)
- T55E1 motor carriage prototype wheeled tank destroyer (USA)
- T92 howitzer motor carriage prototype self-propelled artillery (5; USA)
- T-26 light infantry tank, development of licence-built Vickers 6-ton (10,300 tanks and 1,701 other vehicles; Soviet Union)
- T-27 tankette (2,540; Soviet Union)
- T-28 medium tank (503; Soviet Union)
- T-34 medium tank (34,740 + 22,259 T-34-85; Soviet Union)
- T-35 heavy tank (61; Soviet Union)
- T-37 tank light amphibious tank (~1,200; Soviet Union)
- T-38 tank light amphibious tank (~1,300; Soviet Union)
- T-40 light amphibious tank (222; Soviet Union)
- T-43 tank prototype medium (Soviet Union)
- T-44 medium tank (965; Soviet Union; probably never used in combat)
- T-50 tank light tank (69; Soviet Union)
- T-60 light tank (6,292; Soviet Union)
- T-70 light tank (8,226; Soviet Union)
- T-80 light tank (120; Soviet Union)
- T-100 prototype heavy tank (2; Soviet Union)
- TACAM R-2 tank destroyer (21; Romania)
- TACAM T-60 tank destroyer based on T-60 (34; Romania)
- Tančík vz. 33 tankette (74; Czechoslovakia)
- Tas prototype medium/heavy tank (2; Hungary)
- Terrapin (amphibious vehicle) personnel carrier (500; United Kingdom)
- Tetrarch tank (common name for the Light Tank Mk. VII)
- Thunderbolt Australian cruiser tank Mk. III (1; Australia)
- Tiger tank – see Panzer VI E Tiger I
- TK-3 and TKS tankettes (575; Poland)
- TOG1 prototype heavy tank (1; United Kingdom)
- TOG2 prototype heavy tank (1; United Kingdom)
- Toldi light tanks (202; Hungary)
- Tortoise prototype heavy assault tank (6; United Kingdom)
- Turán I and II medium tanks (424; Hungary)
- Turán III medium tank (2; Hungary)
- Type 89 Chi-Ro (I-Go) medium tank (404; Japan)
- Type 91 heavy tank prototype (1; Japan)
- Type 92 Jyu-Sokosha tankette (167; Japan)
- Type 93 armoured car (5; Japan)
- Type 94 Te-Ke tankette (823; Japan)
- Type 95 heavy tank prototype (4; Japan)
- Type 95 Ha-Go light tank (2,300; Japan)
- Type 97 Te-Ke tankette (616; Japan)
- Type 97 Chi-Ha medium tank (1,162; Japan)
- Type 97 ShinHōtō Chi-Ha medium tank (930; Japan)
- Type 97 Short barrel 120 mm gun tank (12; Japan)
- Type 97 Naval 12 cm self-propelled gun prototype (1; Japan)
- Type 97 Chi-Ni prototype medium tank (1; Japan)
- Type 98 Ta-Se 20 mm prototype self-propelled anti-aircraft gun (1; Japan)
- Type 98 20 mm AAG tank prototype self-propelled anti-aircraft gun (1; Japan)
- Type 98 Ke-Ni light tank (104; Japan)
- Type 98 So-Da armoured personnel carrier (Japan)
- Type 98 Chi-Ho prototype medium tank (4; Japan)
- Type 1 Chi-He medium tank (170; Japan)
- Type 1 Ho-Ha armoured halftrack (Japan)
- Type 1 Ho-Ki armoured personnel carrier (Japan)
- Type 1 Ho-Ni I tank destroyer (26; Japan)
- Type 1 Ho-Ni II tank destroyer (54; Japan)
- Type 1 Ho-I prototype infantry support tank (1; Japan)
- Type 2 Ho-I infantry support tank (31; Japan)
- Type 3 Ho-Ni III tank destroyer (31; Japan)
- Type 2 Ka-Mi amphibious tank (182; Japan)
- Type 3 Ke-Ri prototype light tank (Japan)
- Type 2 Ke-To light tank (34; Japan)
- Type 3 Chi-Nu medium tank (144–166; Japan)
- Type 3 Ka-Chi amphibious tank (19; Japan)
- Type 4 Chi-To prototype medium tank (2 completed; Japan)
- Type 4 Ha-To prototype self-propelled mortar (4; Japan)
- Type 4 Ho-Ro self-propelled gun (12; Japan)
- Type 4 Ho-To prototype self-propelled gun (1; Japan)
- Type 4 Ka-Tsu armoured tracked resupply transport and amphibious torpedo craft (49; Japan)
- Type 4 Ke-Nu light tank (~100; Japan)
- Type 5 Chi-Ri prototype medium tank (1; Japan)
- Type 5 Ho-Ru prototype light tank destroyer (1; Japan)
- Type 5 Ke-Ho prototype light tank (1; Japan)
- Type 5 Na-To prototype tank destroyer (2; Japan)
- Type 5 To-Ku prototype amphibious tank (1; Japan)

== U ==
- Universal Carrier & Bren gun carrier, Scout carrier, MG carriers (84,120; UK, USA, Aus, NZ, Canada)
- Uralmash-1 prototype self-propelled gun (2; Soviet Union)

== V ==
- Valentine tank, Infantry, Mk III (8,275; United Kingdom & Canada)
- Valiant tank prototype infantry tank (1; United Kingdom)
- Vânătorul de care R35 tank destroyer/light tank (33; Romania)
- Verdeja prototype tanks (Spain)
- Vickers 6-Ton light tank (Vickers Mk. E) (~153, export only; United Kingdom)
- Vickers Medium Mark II (160; United Kingdom)

== W ==
- Wespe self-propelled 105 mm howitzer on a Panzer II chassis (676; Germany)
- White-Laffly AMD (<250; France)
- Windsor Carrier (Canada) see Universal Carrier
- Wirbelwind self-propelled antiaircraft gun (87-107; Germany)

== Z ==
- ZiS-30 self-propelled anti-tank gun (101; Soviet Union)
- Zrínyi I tank destroyer (1; Hungary)
- Zrínyi II assault gun (66-72; Hungary)
- ZSU-37 self-propelled anti-aircraft gun (75; Soviet Union)
