= List of prototype World War II combat vehicles =

This list contains combat vehicles which never left the design phase or had an extremely limited production (usually < 10).

== Australia ==
- Australian Cruiser Tank Mark 3 "Thunderbolt"
- Australian Cruiser Tank Mark 4
- Rhino heavy armoured car
- Australian experimental light tank

== Canada ==
- Skink anti-aircraft tank

== Germany ==
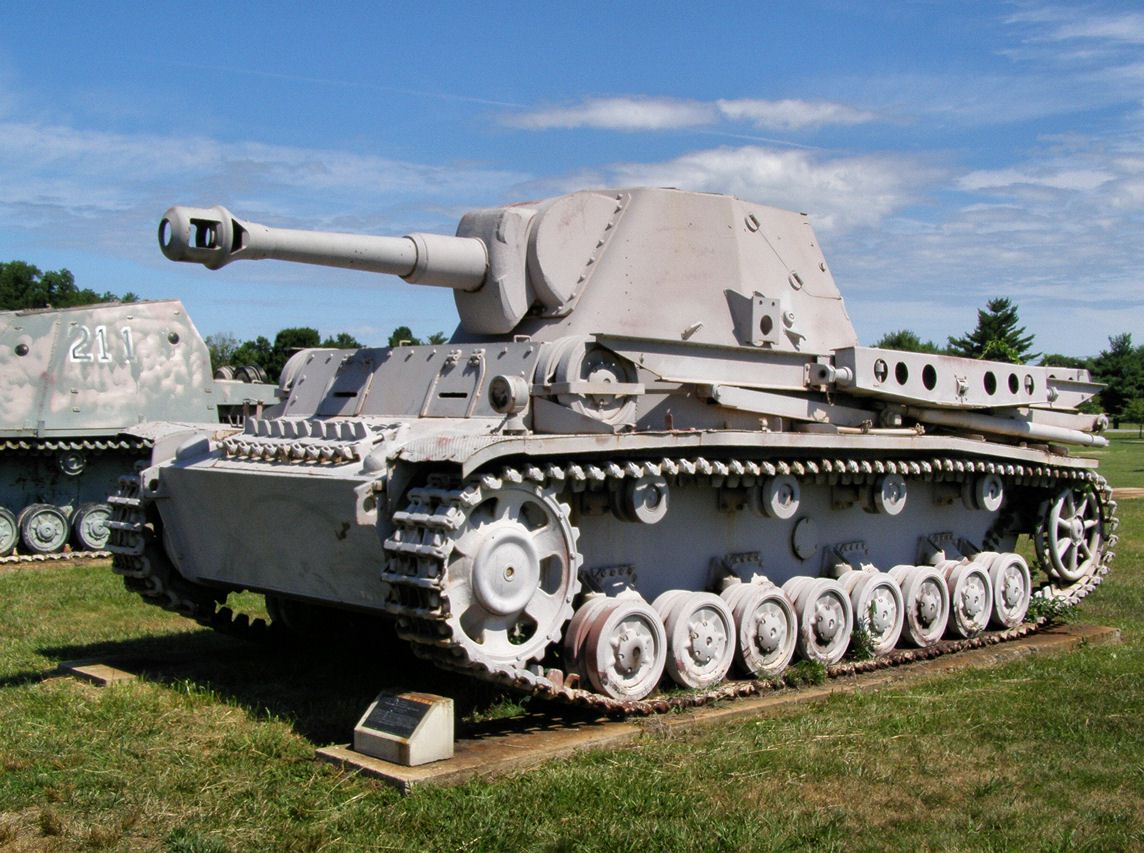
Heuschrecke 10 SPG prototype

- Entwicklung Series Entwicklung series, a comprehensive redesign of German armor from small tracked vehicles to a 100-ton super-heavy tank. Only a single E-100 chassis was completed
- Leichttraktor, pre-war light tank, four built
- Neubaufahrzeug, pre-war heavy tank design, five built
- Panther II, development of the Panzerkampfwagen V "Panther". A single chassis was built
- Panzerkampfwagen VII "Löwe", a super-heavy tank project that never reached prototype stage
- Panzerkampfwagen VIII "Maus", a super-heavy tank. Two prototypes built
- Panzerkampfwagen IX & Panzerkampfwagen X Paper project. Made to deceive allied intelligence.
- Landkreuzer P. 1000 Ratte; paper project
- Landkreuzer P. 1500 Monster; paper project
- 12.8 cm Selbstfahrlafette auf VK 30.01(H) "Sturer Emil" - tank destroyer; 2 built
- Heuschrecke 10, Krupp's design for a new self-propelled artillery gun
- VK 3001 (P) - medium tank; Two hulls built
- VK 3002(DB) - prototype medium tank; one built
- VK 4501 (P) - Porsche Tiger tank; 100 hulls built, 90 converted to Ferdinands, one Tiger (P) built, 3 Bergepanzer Tiger (p) and 3 Rammtigers built.
- VK 45.02 (P), three turrets built
- Dicker Max, two prototypes built
- VK 20, medium tank proposed to replace the Panzer III and Panzer IV; paper project
- Panzer-Selbstfahrlafette II, half-track tank destroyer; two built
- Panzer-Selbstfahrlafette IV Ausf. C, SPG, 3 built
- Geschützwagen Tiger, self-propelled artillery gun; one partial prototype built
- VK 1602 Leopard, reconnaissance tank; paper project

== Hungary ==
- Straussler V-4, amphibious light tank, several prototypes sent to various nations
- Toldi Páncélvadász, Toldi 38M I(A20) Converted to use as tank destroyer mounting a German 7.5 cm Pak 40 Anti-Tank gun; one protoype built
- Toldi II 44M Buzogányvető, Toldi 42M IIA(B40) equipped with two 44M Buzogányvető anti-tank rockets, one tank converted
- 43M Turán III, medium tank; direct upgrade to 41M Turán II medium tank, one prototype produced as well as trial vehicle
- 44M Zrínyi I, tank destroyer based on the 43M Zrínyi II assault gun; one prototype built
- 44M Tas, medium/heavy tank, two unfinished prototypes built

== Italy ==
- Semovente da 20/70 quadruplo, self-propelled anti-aircraft gun
- Semovente da 149/40, self-propelled gun
- Fiat M16/43, fast medium tank
- P43 heavy tank, Fiat Ansaldo's design for a new heavy tank.

== Japan ==
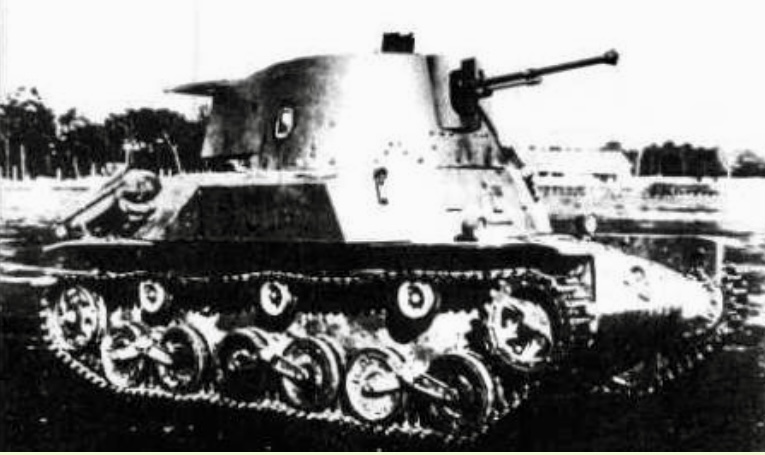
Type 98 Ta-Se SPAAG - side angle view

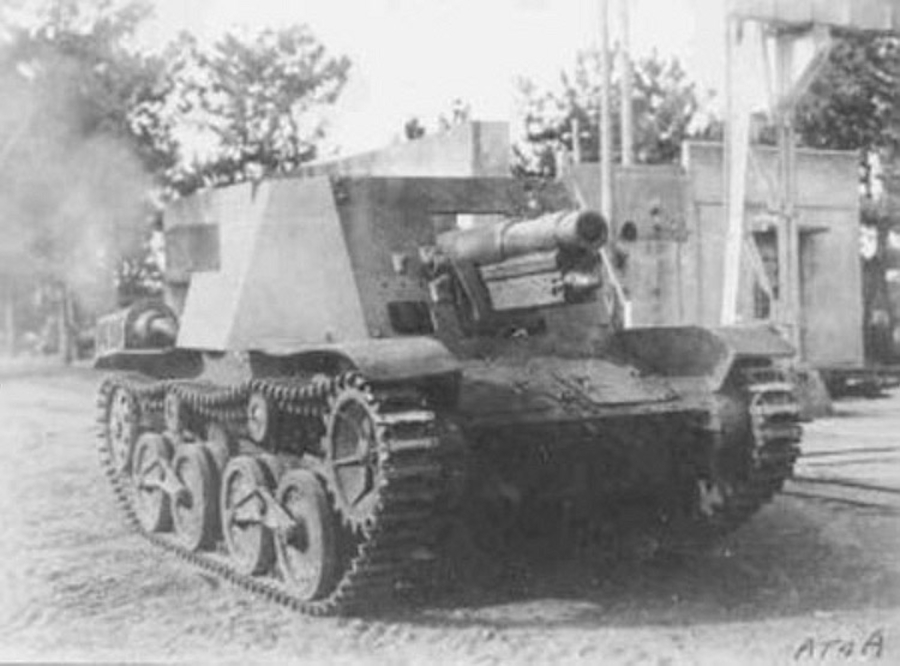
Type 4 Ho-To SPG prototype with a Type 38 12 cm howitzer

- Type 95 heavy tank; 4 built in 1934
- Type 97 Chi-Ni medium tank; one prototype built
- Type 98 Chi-Ho medium tank; 4 built, two in 1940 and two in 1941
- O-I super-heavy tank design in the 120-ton range. Exact stage of development unknown
- Type 97 Ki-To SPAAG self-propelled anti-aircraft gun on Type 97 Te-Ke tankette chassis; one prototype built
- Type 98 Ta-Se single 20 mm self-propelled anti-aircraft gun on a Type 98 Ke-Ni chassis
- Type 98 20 mm AAG tank twin 20 mm self-propelled anti-aircraft gun on a Type 98 Ke-Ni chassis
- Type 1 Ho-I infantry support gun tank; one prototype built
- ATG Carrier So-To; light armored transport with an AT Gun in a Type 97 Te-Ke tankette structure
- Type 3 Ke-Ri light tank; a few prototypes were produced
- Special number 3 light tank Ku-Ro; only a prototype mock-up was completed
- Experimental Type 97 Chi-Yu mine flail tank; one prototype built
- Experimental Type 97 mine clearing tank GS; one prototype built

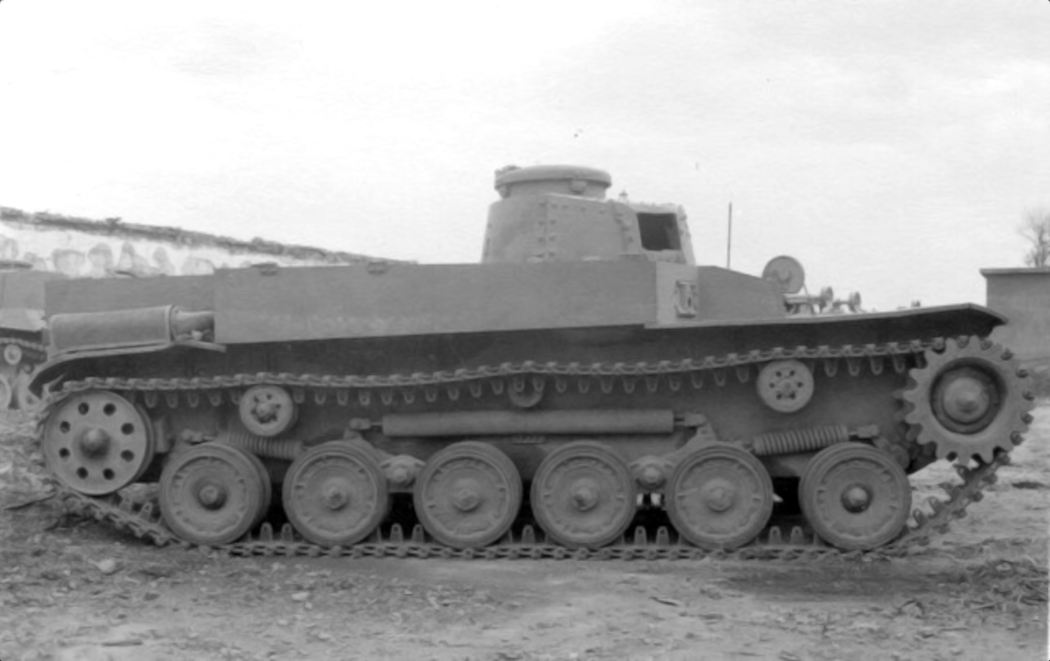
Type 97 experimental flamethrower tank number 2

- Type 97 Experimental flamethrower tank; two prototypes. The first version replaced the hull machine gun with a flamethrower. The second version was fitted with two large, elongated fuel tanks and two flamethrowers on each side of the chassis. It utilized an electric flame igniter system.
- Type 2 Ku-Se 75 mm self-propelled gun on a Type 1 Chi-He chassis
- Type 4 Chi-To medium tank; two completed and four chassis manufactured
- Type 5 Chi-Ri medium tank; one incomplete prototype built
- Type 4 Ho-To 12 cm self-propelled gun on a modified Type 95 Ha-Go chassis
- Type 5 Ho-Ru 47 mm self-propelled gun; a light tank destroyer akin to the German Hetzer; one prototype built
- Type 5 Ke-Ho light tank; one prototype built
- Hi-Ro Sha 10 cm cannon self-propelled gun on Type 95 heavy tank chassis
- Ji-Ro Type 92 10 cm cannon self-propelled gun on Type 95 heavy tank chassis
- Type 5 Na-To tank destroyer; two built
- Type 5 To-Ku amphibious tank
- Naval 12 cm SPG; one prototype built with a mounted Type 10 120 mm gun on a Type 97 Chi-Ha chassis
- Experimental anti-aircraft tank Ta-Ha; incomplete prototype on a Type 1 Chi-He chassis
- Ka-To 105 mm SP AT gun was a combination of the Type 5 Na-To open top superstructure and the extended hull of the Type 4 Chi-To. Exact stage of development unknown
- Type 5 Ho-Ri tank destroyer with a 105 mm cannon and an additional 37 mm gun; exact status unknown
- Type 5 15 cm SPG Ho-Chi; similar to Type 1 Ho-Ni I and Type 4 Ho-Ro SPGs, with a Type 96 15 cm (149.1 mm) howitzer mounted on a Type 97 chassis. Stage of development unknown

== New Zealand ==
- Schofield tank
- Bob Semple tank

== Poland ==
- 9TP light tank
- 4TP (light) tank
- 10TP tank
- 14TP medium tank
- 20/25TP medium tank
- PZInż 130 amphibious tank
- PZInż 152
- PZInż 202
- PZInż 222
- PZInż 303
- PZInż 342
- PZInż 603
- TKW (light) reconnaissance tank
- TKS-D light tank destroyer

== Romania ==
- Mareșal tank destroyer
- TACAM T-38

== Spain ==
- Verdeja

== Soviet Union ==
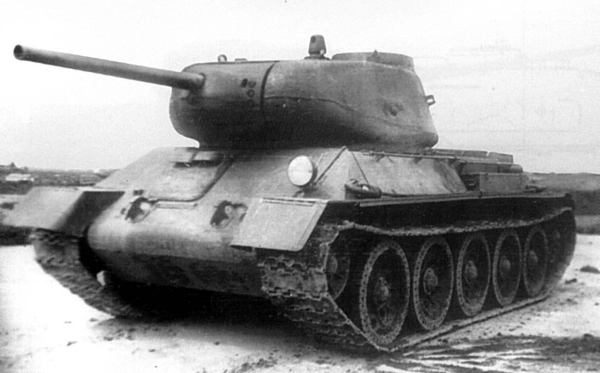
T-43 prototype medium tank

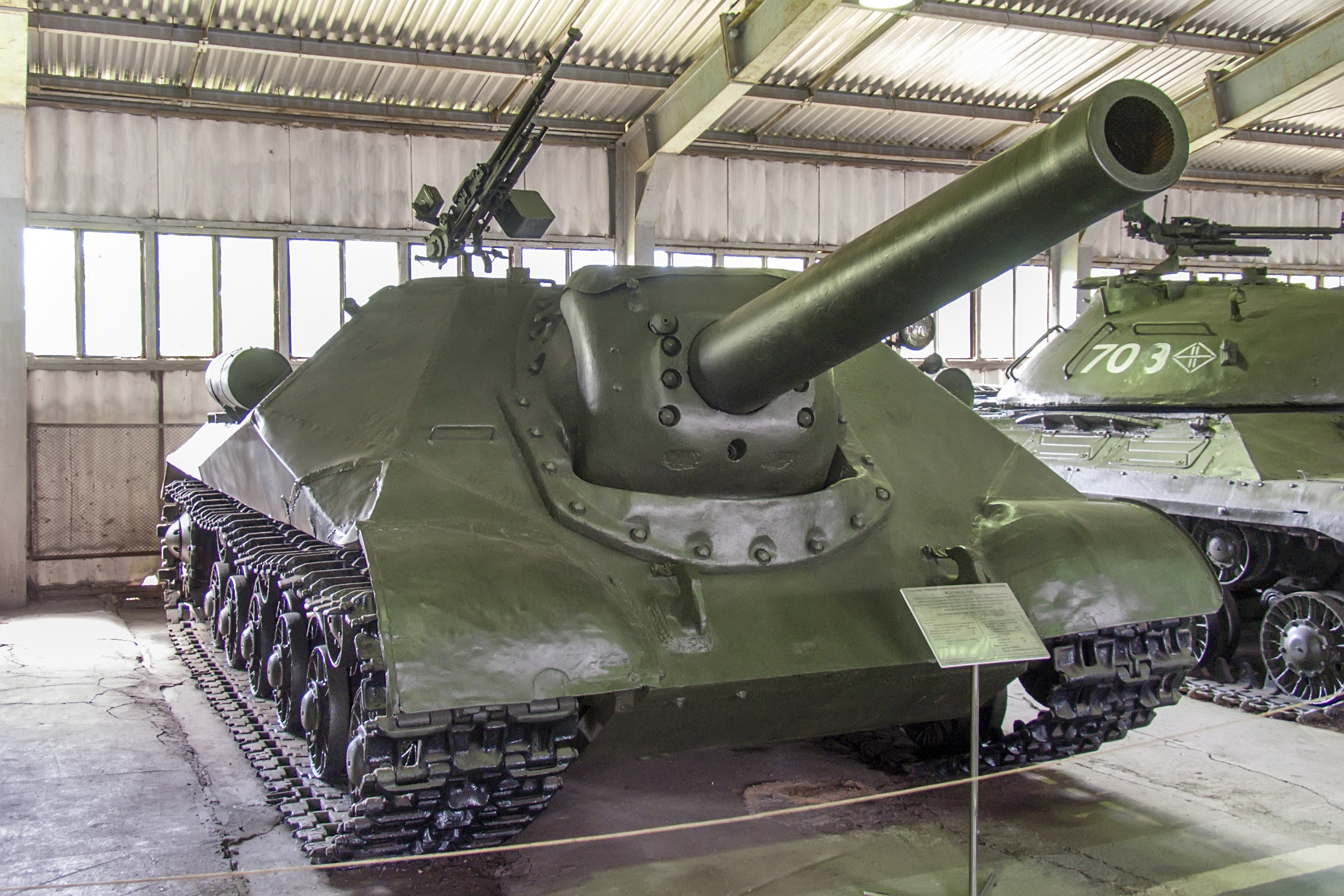
Object 704 prototype self-propelled gun

- Antonov A-40
- T-43 medium tank
- SMK tank heavy tank; one built
- T-100 tank heavy tank
- T-150
- SU-100Y Self-Propelled Gun 130mm gun on the T-100 chassis
- SU-14 heavy self-propelled gun on a T-35 chassis
- PPG tankette
- S-51 Self-Propelled Gun
- KV-3
- KV-4 super-heavy tank; paper project
- KV-5
- KV-7
- KV-8
- KV-9
- KV-10
- KV-11
- KV-12
- KV-13 Three prototypes built.
- KV-220 heavy tank; two built
- Object 245 rearmed IS-2 with a 100mm D-10T gun
- ISU-152-2 long barreled ISU-152 variant
- Object 704
- IS-6 heavy tank
- Object 252U
- T-34-100
- T-44-100
- Object 701 IS-4, prototypes only

== United Kingdom ==
- Tank, Heavy, TOG I
- Tank Heavy, TOG II
- Tank, Heavy Assault, Excelsior (A33)
- Tank, Infantry, Valiant (A38)
- Tank, Heavy Assault, Tortoise (A39)
- Tank, Infantry, Black Prince (A43)
- A20 heavy tank
- Alecto

== United States ==
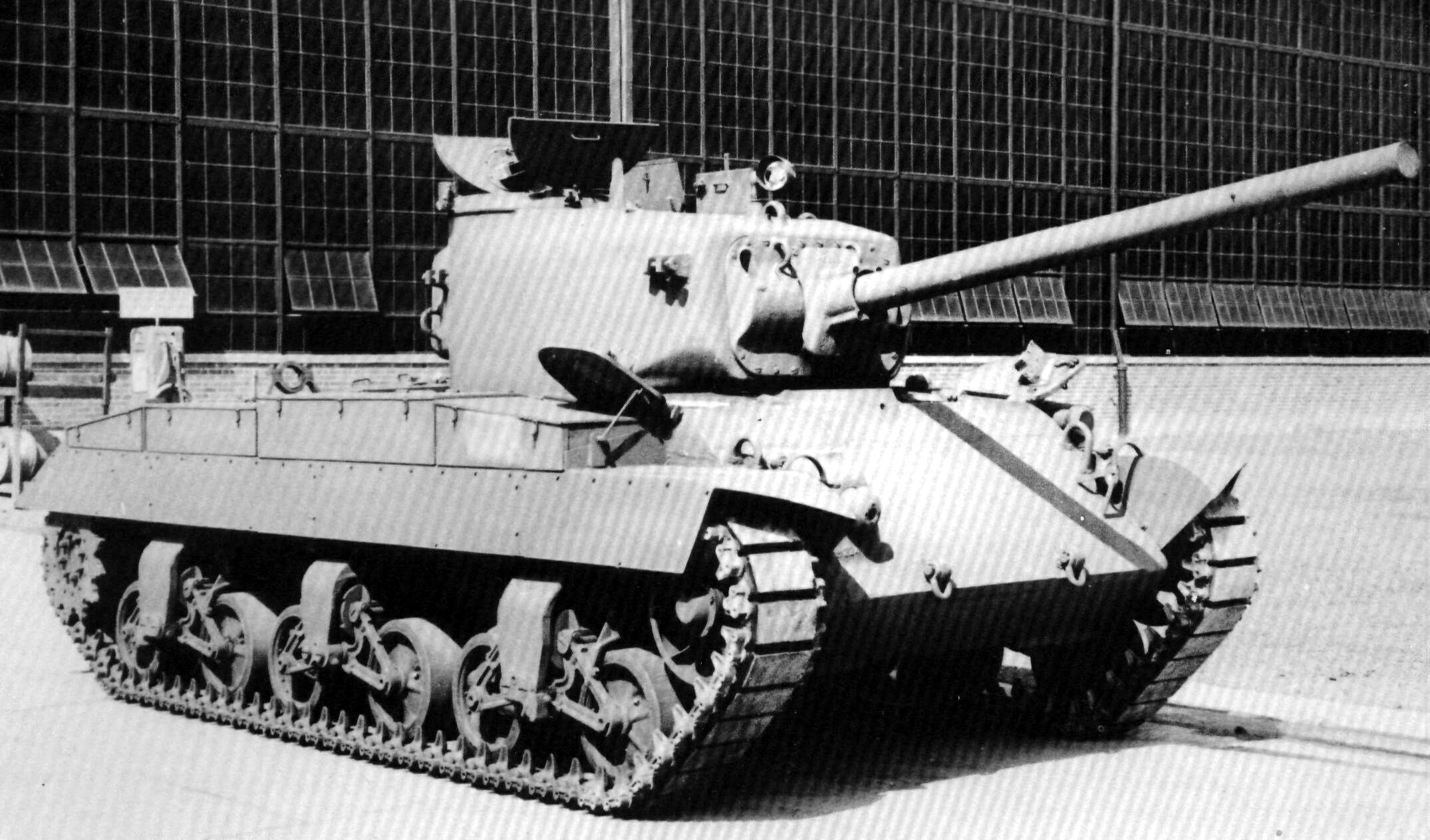
T20 prototype medium tank

- M6 heavy tank
- M7 medium tank
- M38 Wolfhound
- T14 heavy tank
- T18 howitzer motor carriage; 75 mm howitzer on a M3 chassis
- T20 medium tank
- T27 armored car
- T28 super-heavy tank
- T29 heavy tank
- T30 heavy tank
- T32 heavy tank
- T34 heavy tank
- T40/M9 tank destroyer
- T54 gun motor carriage
- T26E5 Uparmored T26E3
- T55E1 gun motor carriage
- T82 howitzer motor carriage
- T84 howitzer motor carriage
- T88 gun motor carriage; 105 mm howitzer on a M18 chassis
- T92 howitzer motor carriage
- Super Pershing

== See also ==
- List of armoured fighting vehicles of World War II
