= 10 cm schwere Kanone 18 =

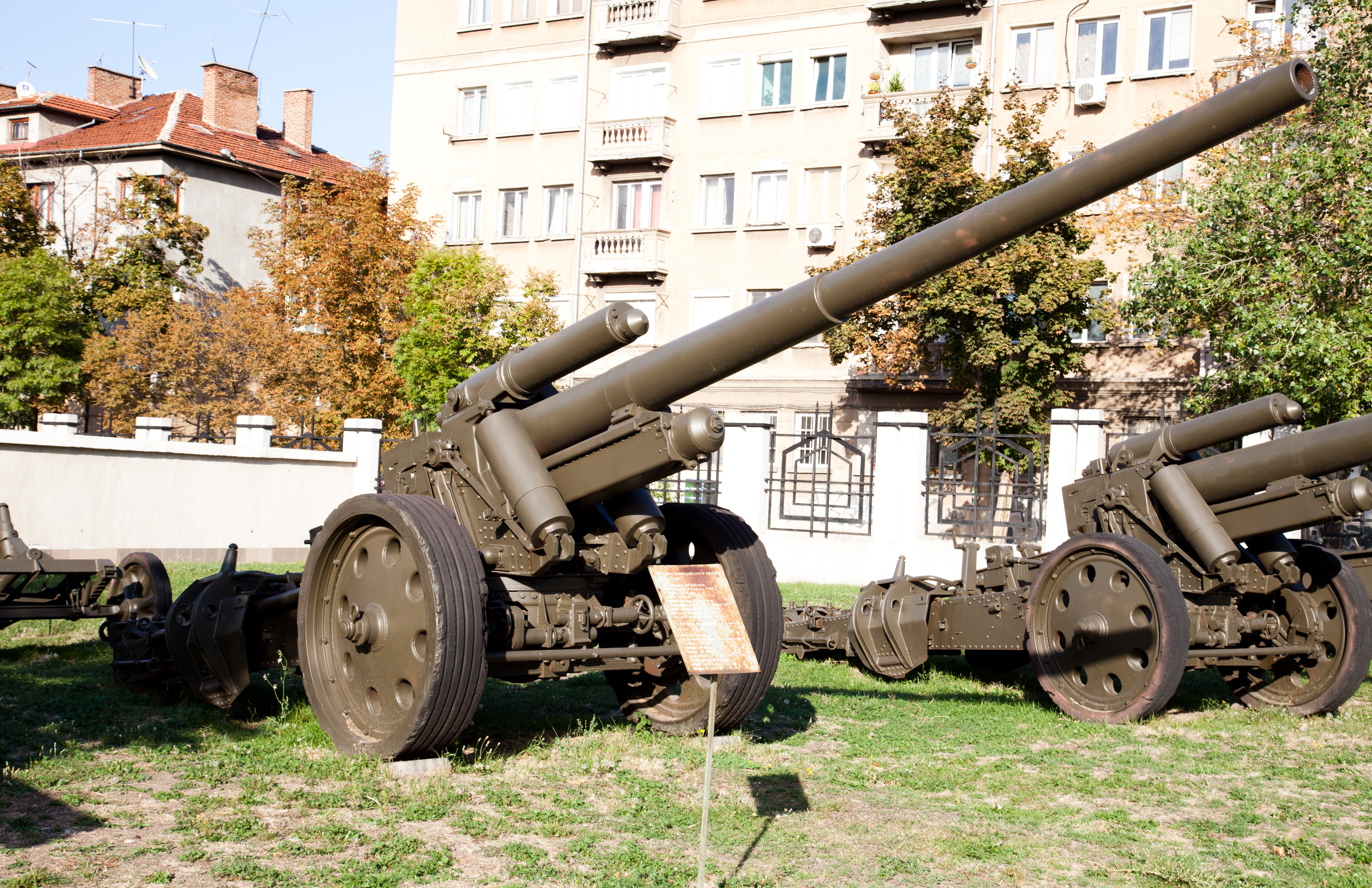
- 10 cm schwere Kanone 18 at the National Museum of Military History, Bulgaria, Sofia.
- Type: Field gun
- Place of origin: Germany

Service history
- Used by: Nazi Germany; Albania; Bulgaria
- Wars: World War II

Production history
- Produced: 1934–1944
- No. built: 1,433

Specifications
- Mass: 5,642 kg (12,438 lbs)
- Barrel length: 5.46 m (18 ft) L/52
- Shell: separate-loading, cased charge (3 charges)
- Shell weight: 15.14 kg (33.4 lb)
- Caliber: 105 mm (4.13 in)
- Breech: horizontal sliding-block
- Carriage: Split trail
- Elevation: 0° to +48°
- Traverse: 64°
- Rate of fire: 6 rpm
- Muzzle velocity: 835 m/s (2,739 ft/s)
- Effective firing range: 19 km (12 mi)

The 10 cm schwere Kanone 18 (10 cm sK 18) was a field gun used by Germany in World War II. The German army wanted a new 10.5 cm gun as well as 15 cm howitzer, which were to share the same carriage. Guns are heavier than howitzers due to the longer barrel. This also led to the 15 cm sFH 18. As such, both weapons had a similar weight and could be carried by a similar carriage. By 1926, Krupp and Rheinmetall had specimen designs, and prototypes were ready by 1930, but was not fielded until 1933–34. Both Krupp and Rheinmetall competed for the development contract, but the Wehrmacht compromised and selected Krupp's carriage to be mated with Rheinmetall's gun.

It sometimes equipped the medium artillery battalion (with the 15 cm sFH 18) of German divisions, but generally was used by independent artillery battalions and on coast defense duties. Some were used as anti-tank guns during the early stages of war on the Eastern Front, as well as on the prototype self propelled gun "Dicker Max". Around 1,500 guns were produced until 1945. After the war, it served with the Albanian and Bulgarian armies.

== Gallery ==
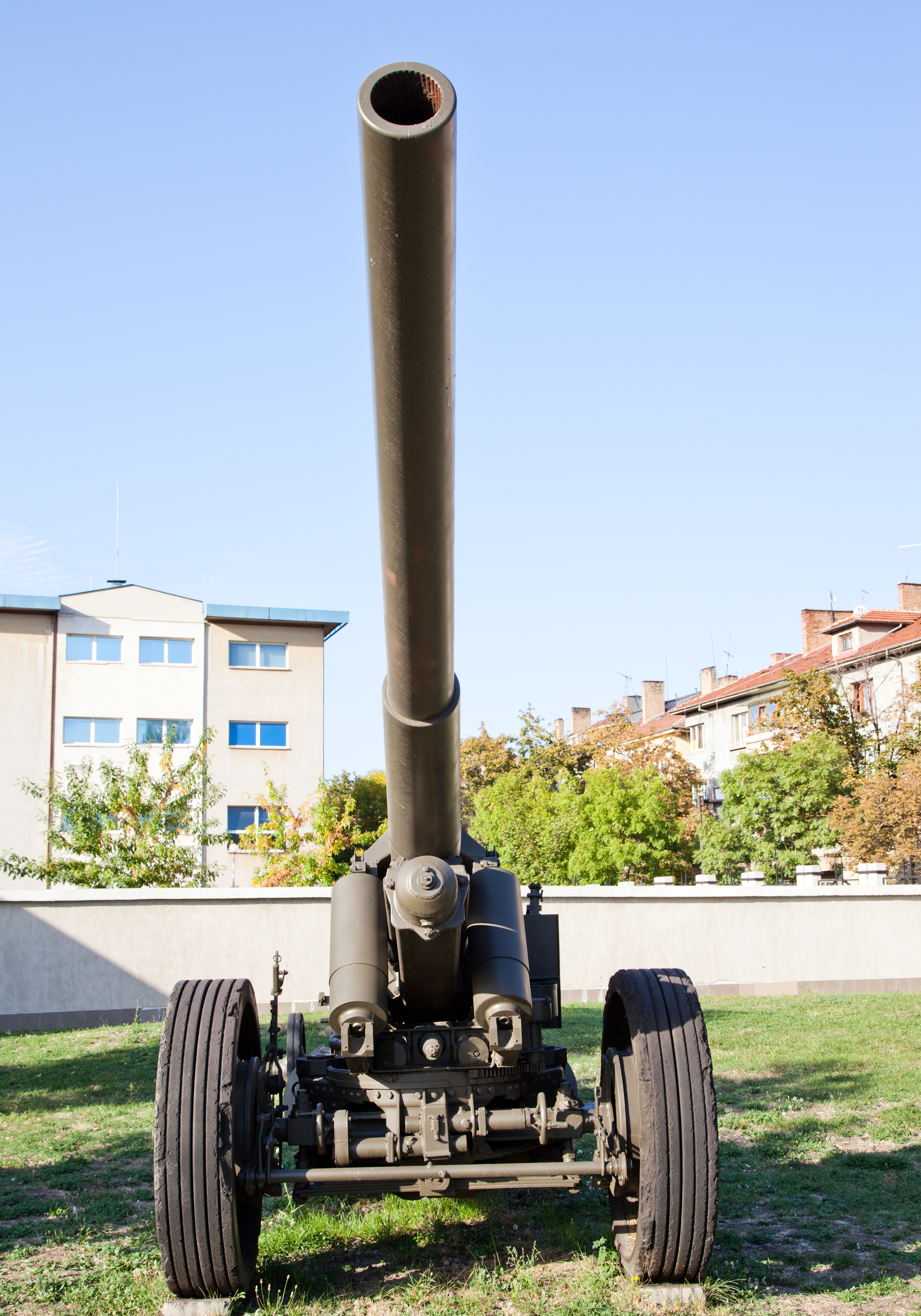
Front of 10 cm schwere Kanone 18 at National Museum of Military History, Bulgaria, Sofia.

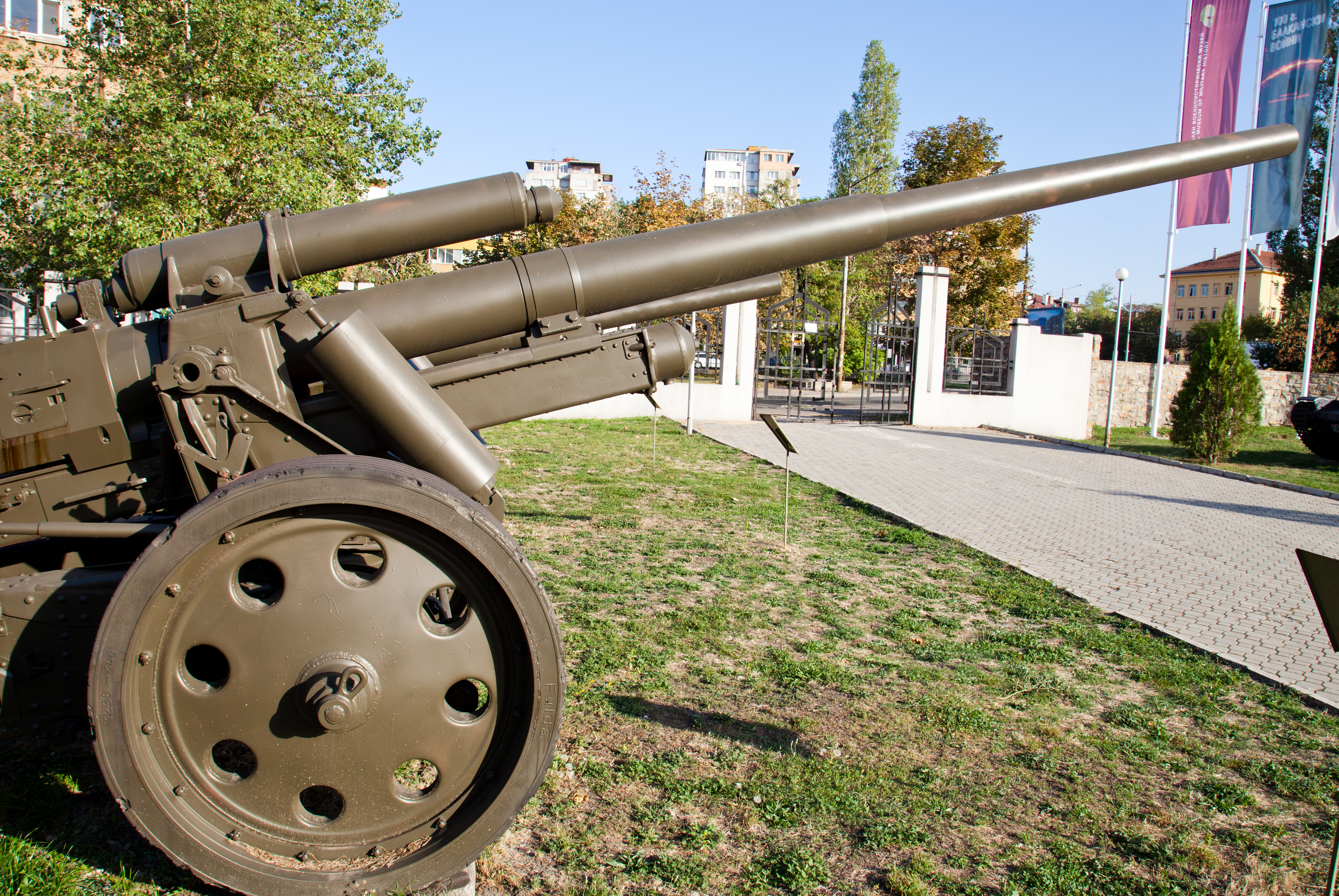
Side of 10 cm schwere Kanone 18 at National Museum of Military History, Bulgaria, Sofia.

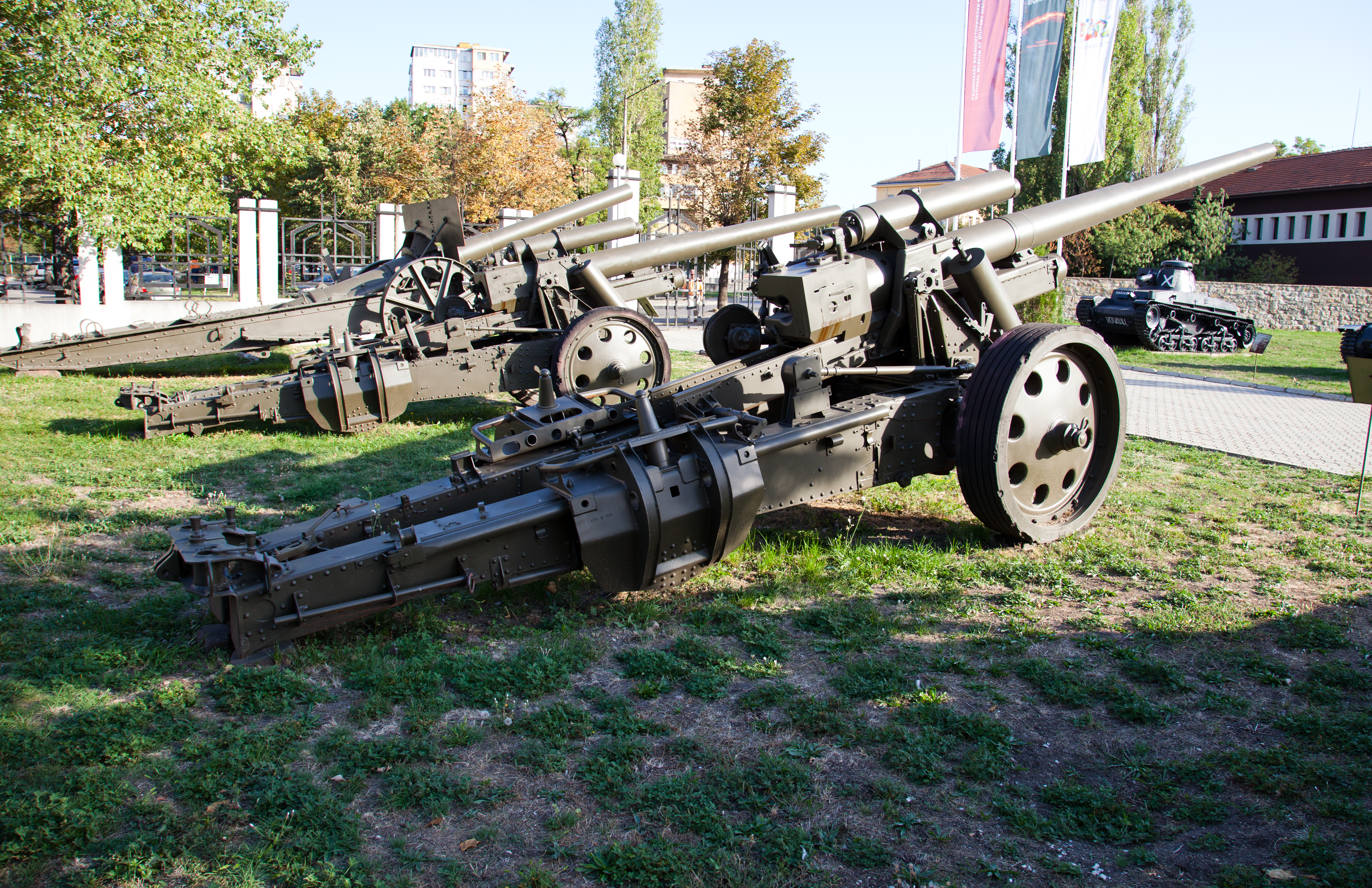
Back of 10 cm schwere Kanone 18 at National Museum of Military History, Bulgaria, Sofia.

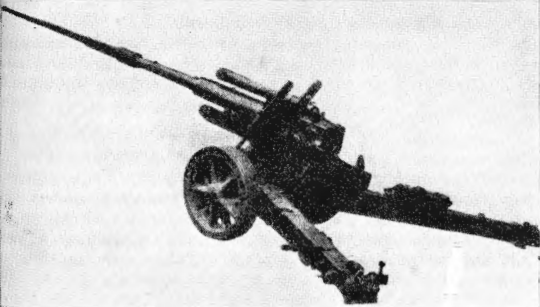
10 cm schwere Kanone 18 fitted with an 8,8 cm squeeze-bore adapter attached to the muzzle.

== Sources ==
- Engelmann, Joachim and Scheibert, Horst. Deutsche Artillerie 1934–1945: Eine Dokumentation in Text, Skizzen und Bildern: Ausrüstung, Gliederung, Ausbildung, Führung, Einsatz. Limburg/Lahn, Germany: C. A. Starke, 1974
- Gander, Terry and Chamberlain, Peter. Weapons of the Third Reich: An Encyclopedic Survey of All Small Arms, Artillery and Special Weapons of the German Land Forces 1939–1945. New York: Doubleday, 1979 ISBN 0-385-15090-3
- Hogg, Ian V. German Artillery of World War Two. 2nd corrected edition. Mechanicsville, Stackpole Books, 1997 ISBN 1-85367-480-X
