= Hillman Gnat =

British WWII armored car

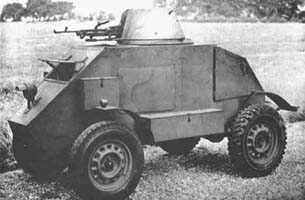
- Hillman Gnat armoured car
- Type: Armoured car
- Place of origin: United Kingdom

Service history
- In service: 1940-1942 (trialed only)
- Used by: British Army
- Wars: World War II

Production history
- Designer: Hillman
- Designed: 1940
- Manufacturer: Hillman
- No. built: 4

Specifications
- Crew: 2 (1x Driver, 1x Commander/Gunner)
- Main armament: .303 in Bren gun
- Drive: Wheeled 4x2
- References: The Tank Museum

The Hillman Gnat was an experimental World War II era light armoured car developed in Britain.

== History ==
The Hillman Gnat was designed around 1940 as a two-man light armoured car, it was intended to replace machine gun armed, unarmoured motorcycles that were fielded in significant numbers by the British Army, but were going out of favour at the time. The Gnat's development, along with the Morris Salamander, was sponsored by the then Brigadier Vyvyan Pope.

The vehicle was based on the Hillman 10hp Utility (which was in turn derived from the Hillman Minx) with the engine relocated to the rear of the hull and the transmission rearranged. The driver sat at the front while the crew commander sat behind and above, the latter was supplied with a tiny, open topped turret. The vehicle was armed with a single Bren gun and was not provided with a radio.

Trials of the Gnat and the Salamander revealed they were too underpowered to perform in their intended role without four-wheel drive, the Gnat being particularly handicapped. Impetus for the project waned upon the death of the then Major General Vyvyan Pope in 1941, and both it and the Salamander were cancelled in 1942.

In total four Hillman Gnats were produced.

== Survivors and replicas ==
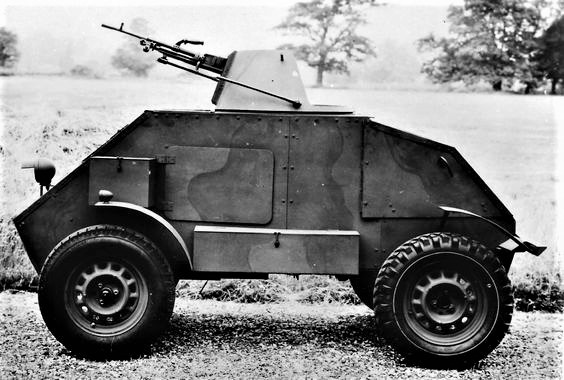
Side view of the Hillman Gnat

As of 2020, there is one confirmed replica in existence. The replica was shown during the Tankfest of 2017. It is unknown if there are any surviving Hillman Gnats to this date.

== See also ==
- British armoured fighting vehicle production during World War II
