= Lanchester 6×4 armoured car =

British armoured car

Lanchester Armoured Car Mk II
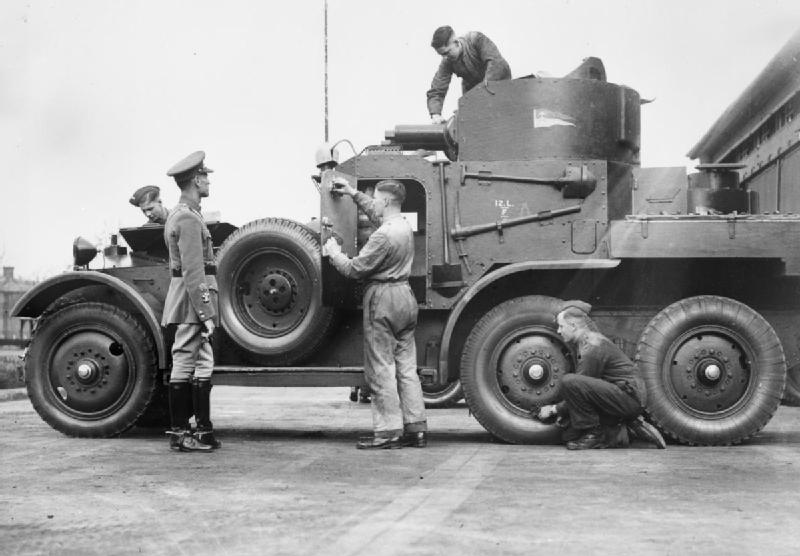
- Mark II Lanchester
- Place of origin: United Kingdom

Production history
- Manufacturer: Lanchester Motor Company

Specifications
- Mass: 7 t
- Length: 6.10 m (20 ft 0 in)
- Width: 2.02 m (6 ft 8 in)
- Height: 2.82 m (9 ft 3 in)
- Crew: 4
- Armour: 9 mm
- Main armament: 0.50 inch (12.7mm) Vickers machine gun
- Secondary armament: 2 x 0.303 inch (7.7 mm) Vickers machine gun
- Engine: Lanchester 6-cyl. petrol engine 90 hp (67 kW)
- Power/weight: 12.9 hp/ton
- Suspension: 6×4, leaf spring
- Operational range: 320 km (200 mi)
- Maximum speed: 72 km/h (45 mph)

The Lanchester 6×4 armoured car was a British armoured car with a 6×4 drivetrain produced in limited numbers in the late 1920s and early 1930s. A heavier, more rugged development of the earlier Lanchester 4x2 armoured car, it remained in service with Territorial and colonial units until the early 1940s and saw action in the Battle of Malaya.

== Production history and description ==
In 1927, the Lanchester Motor Company was awarded a contract for a six-wheeled armoured car. By March 1928 two prototypes, D1E1 and D1E2 (the latter equipped with rear doors for a swift exit) were built with different armament and turret shapes, D1E2 also having an additional rear driving position.

Following the trials it was realised the existing chassis was insufficiently strong or rigid for such a heavy vehicle driven cross-country. In July 1928 Twenty-two Mk1 production vehicles with an improved chassis and other detail changes were ordered, eighteen with one .5 and one .303 (7.7 mm) Vickers machine guns dual-mounted in the turret and one in the hull position to the left of the driver, and four 'A' command variants in which communications gear replaced the hull-mounted .303 Vickers and the gunner's position was occupied by a wireless operator. In both versions the turret featured an independently rotating cupola.

In October 1929 eight more vehicles were ordered: three MkII and three MIIA command variants, and two more instructional vehicles, D1E3 and D1E4.

The developed Lanchester, while having a 6×4 drive train (six wheels, four driven) was fitted with an armoured body similar in shape to that of the Rolls-Royce Armoured Car rather than the sloped engine compartment of the earlier model which could deflect glancing shots into the car.

In both marks and all versions the Lanchesters featured the same basic functional arrangement: a frontal engine compartment; a main fighting compartment mounting a fully traversing turret; and rear equipment stowage; a two-man turret mounting one .5 inch (12.7 mm) and one .303 inch (7.7 mm) Vickers machine guns co-axially; and fitted with a cupola that could be independently rotated, greatly aiding observation while hatches were closed.

Lanchesters had good cross-country performance (particularly in the new 6×4 form), they were considered reliable and easy to maintain but proved too big, too top-heavy and too slow for the reconnaissance missions for which they were originally conceived. When alternative reconnaissance vehicles became available, notably the Morris Light Reconnaissance Car (MLR), Lanchesters were assigned to the colonial policing role, one in which they served until the outbreak of World War Two.

== Deployment history ==
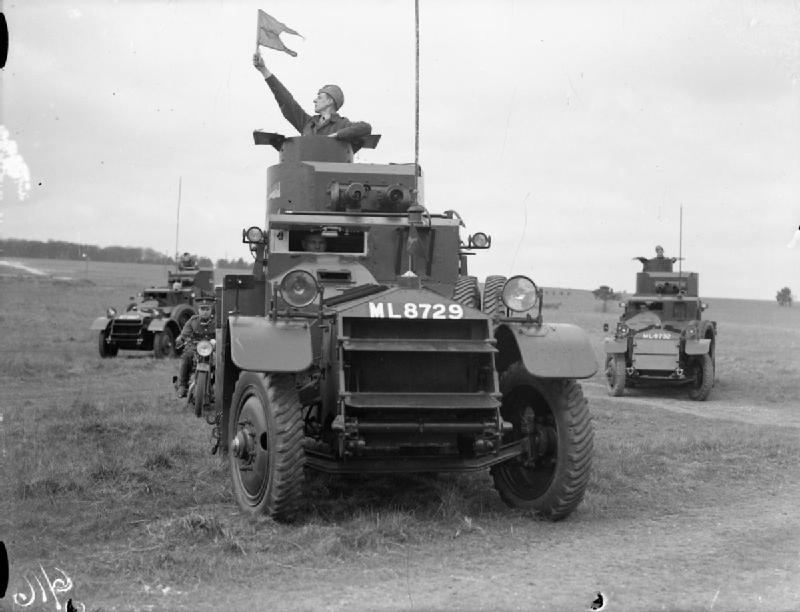
Lanchester of the 12th Lancers during manoeuvres

In January 1929 the first Lanchesters (and Rolls-Royce armoured cars transferred from Navy and Air force stocks) were received by the 11th Hussars regiment as part of its mechanization from horse-mounted cavalry. Because of slow rate of delivery, it took until 1934 to fully equip the unit. In November the regiment was relocated to Egypt to relieve the 12th Royal Lancers, which returned to Britain and took over the cars.

In January–February 1935 a provisional D squadron of the 12th Lancers with eight armoured cars served as a peacekeeping force in the Saar region. On 31 December B and C squadrons were sent again to Egypt with 29 armoured cars as a response to the Italian invasion of Abyssinia and strengthening garrisons in Libya. They were used in patrolling the western frontier. By the end of 1936 the squadrons were returned to Britain, where the regiment was re-equipped with Morris Light Reconnaissance Cars.

By 1939, most Lanchesters (13 Mk I; 1 Mk IA; 5 Mk II; and 3 Mk IIA) were sent to the Far East and assigned to the Selangor and Perak battalions of Federated Malay States Volunteer Force, the Singapore Volunteer Corps, Straits Settlements Volunteer Force and the 2nd battalion of Argyll & Sutherland Highlanders in Malay, some of which took part in the Malayan Campaign (December 1941 – 15 February 1942) against Japan.

10 Lanchesters were given to the Territorial Army (23rd London Armoured Car Company and 1st Derbyshire Yeomanry) and in 1940 one was converted to provide protected transportation for use by Cabinet ministers and other VIPs.

In 1941 two were given to the 1st Belgian armoured car squadron.

The only surviving vehicle is a Mk II on display at the Bovington Tank Museum.

== Variants ==
- Mk I (18 built) - dual rear tyres
- Mk IA (4 built) - command version
- Mk II (7 built) - single tyres, turret cupola with sloped sides
- Mk IIA (6 built) - command version
