= O-I super-heavy tank =

Japanese prototype super-heavy tank of World War II

O-I
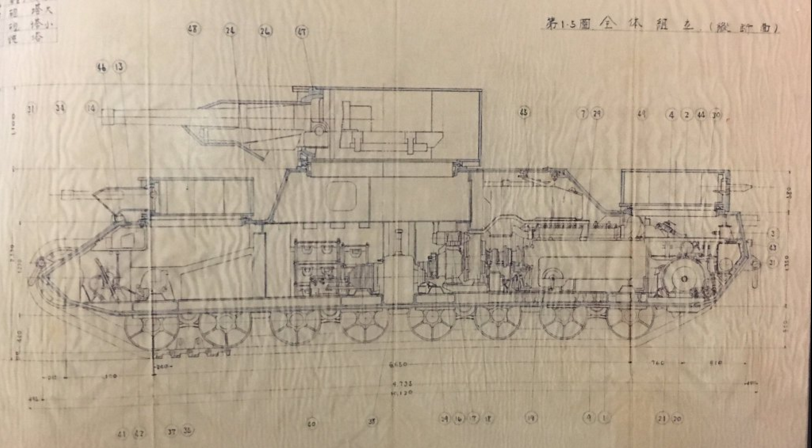
- Diagram illustrating the interior side view of the O-I
- Type: Super-heavy tank
- Place of origin: Empire of Japan

Production history
- Designed: 1940 (100-ton O-I), 1944 (120+ ton O-I)
- Produced: incomplete prototype
- No. built: 1 incomplete prototype

Specifications
- Mass: 120+ tons
- Length: 10.12 m
- Width: 4.84 m
- Height: 3.63 m
- Crew: 11
- Armor: maximum of 150 mm
- Main armament: Type 92 105 mm/L45 gun
- Secondary armament: 2 x 70 mm guns in the two front hull sub-turrets and 2 x Type 97 7.7 mm machine guns in a rear sub-turret.
- Engine: Two V-12 gasoline engines 550 hp (410 kW) x2
- Power/weight: ~4.58 hp/t
- Suspension: coil springs
- Maximum speed: 25 km/h

O-I was the designation given to a proposed series of Japanese super-heavy tanks designed during World War II. The vehicle was planned to be very heavy and have a crew of 11. The complete history of the O-I is unknown, due to the “obscure” nature of the project and the limited documentation that survived post-war.

== History and development ==
After the Battles of Khalkhin Gol against the Soviet Union in 1939, Japan tried to improve their tank designs using lessons learned from this battle. Many Japanese tanks such as the Type 95 Ha-Go light tank and the Type 97 Chi-Ha medium tanks were proven to be insufficient to counter Soviet armored forces. A larger tank design was urgently needed. A super heavy tank project was proposed directly in response to the Japanese defeat at Khalkhin Gol.

In early 1940, Hideo Iwakuro, a colonel with the Army Ministry of Japan (陸軍省 Rikugun-shō) ordered the Army Engineering Division to develop a new super heavy tank. Colonel Iwakuro indicated that the new tank should be at least two times larger than the prototype Type 95 heavy tank (26 tonnes). The general outer appearance design was not dissimilar to the Type 95 heavy tank. The proposed 100-ton prototype was to be equipped with a Type 92 105 mm cannon (Type 92 10 cm cannon) for its main gun.

The development process was restarted by the Mitsubishi Heavy Industries Tokyo Machinery Division on the 120+ ton version under the designation "Mi-To" (for Mitsubishi-Tokyo). Later it was given the official designation of the "O-I tank" (オイ車). "オ" is an abbreviation of "大き"(big or large) and "イ" in Japanese army nomenclature, refers to model number 1, from the old Japanese alphabet iroha. The tank was again to be equipped with a modified Type 92 105 mm cannon for its main turret gun. Its two smaller front hull turrets were designed to be "offset slightly left from the mid-point". According to Akira Takizawa (on the original plans) as secondary armament, the two front hull sub-turrets were designed to each carry a 70 mm gun and a rear hull sub-turret was designed to have a twin mount Type 97 7.7 mm machine gun.

One of the main features of the O-I tank was its thick armor, which had a maximum thickness of up to 150 mm. The tank was to have two V-12 petrol-fueled aircraft engines designed by BMW in Germany and licensed to Kawasaki Heavy Industries in Japan. This was the same engine used in the Type 5 Chi-Ri medium tank. The engines were mounted "lengthwise parallel to each other" in the rear hull.

According to historian Steven Zaloga, there were "rumors that work was underway" on the 120-ton version. According to Takizawa, one incomplete prototype without turrets was built. However, the tank was "unpractical" and the project terminated. According to Kenneth Estes, the O-I project was cancelled before the 120+ ton prototype was completed. According to another source, the model kit company FineMolds in Japan bought some original documents and design plans of the O-I. The source contends that the proposed 100-ton design and "140–150" ton design are "incorrect representations of the O-I". A tank track from the project is on display at the JGSDF Fuji School in Japan. The complete development history of the O-I prototype is unknown and no photographs of the incomplete O-I are known to exist.

== Gallery ==
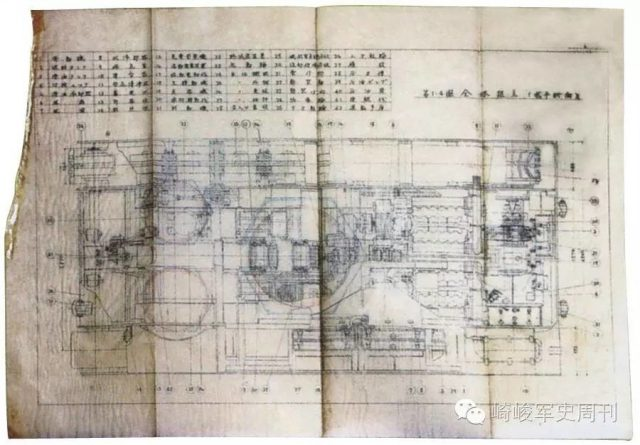
Diagram illustrating the O-I interior top view

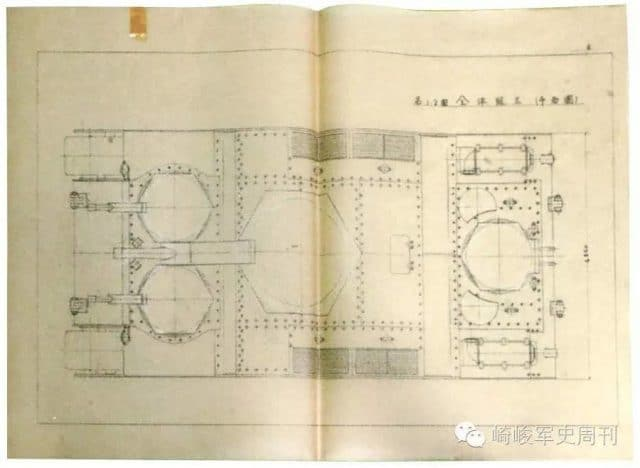
Diagram illustrating the O-I top view

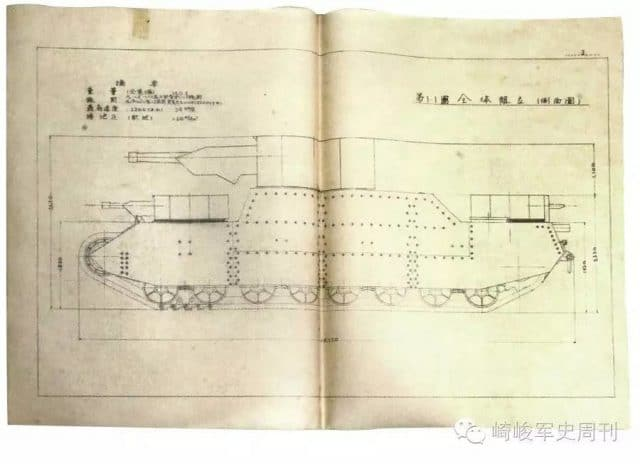
Diagram illustrating the O-I side view

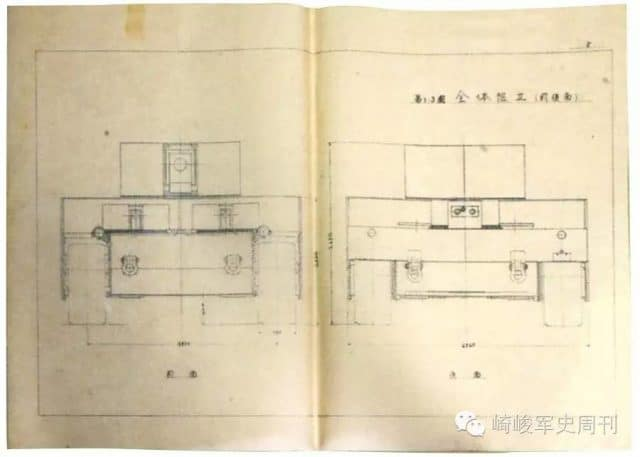
Diagram illustrating the O-I front and back view

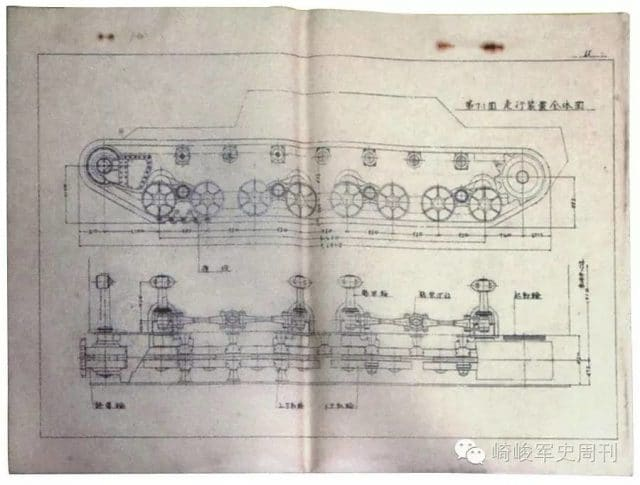
Diagram of the O-I suspension

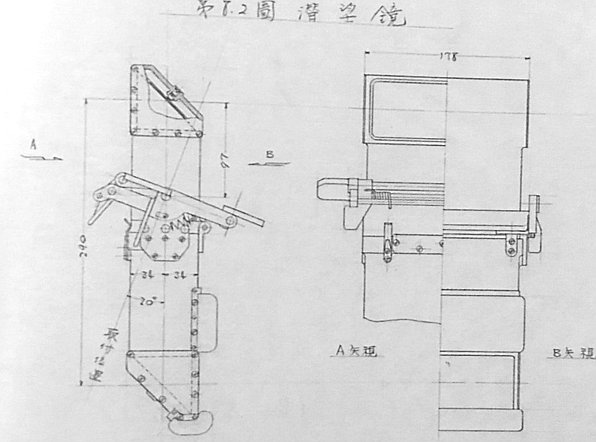
Diagram of the O-I driver's periscope

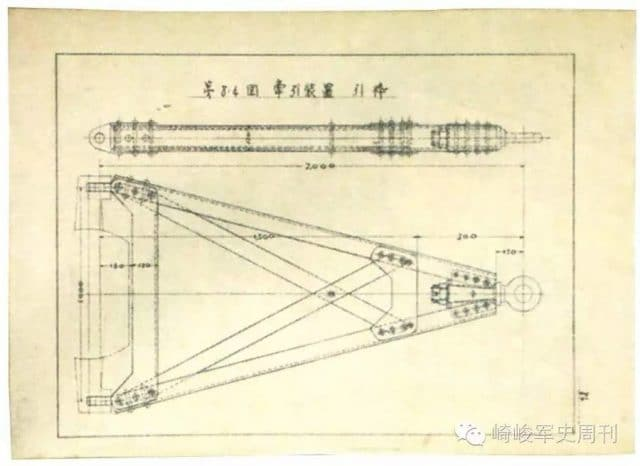
Diagram of the O-I tow bar
