= Fox armoured car =

Canadian armoured car

Fox armoured car Armoured car, General Motors Mark I (Fox I)
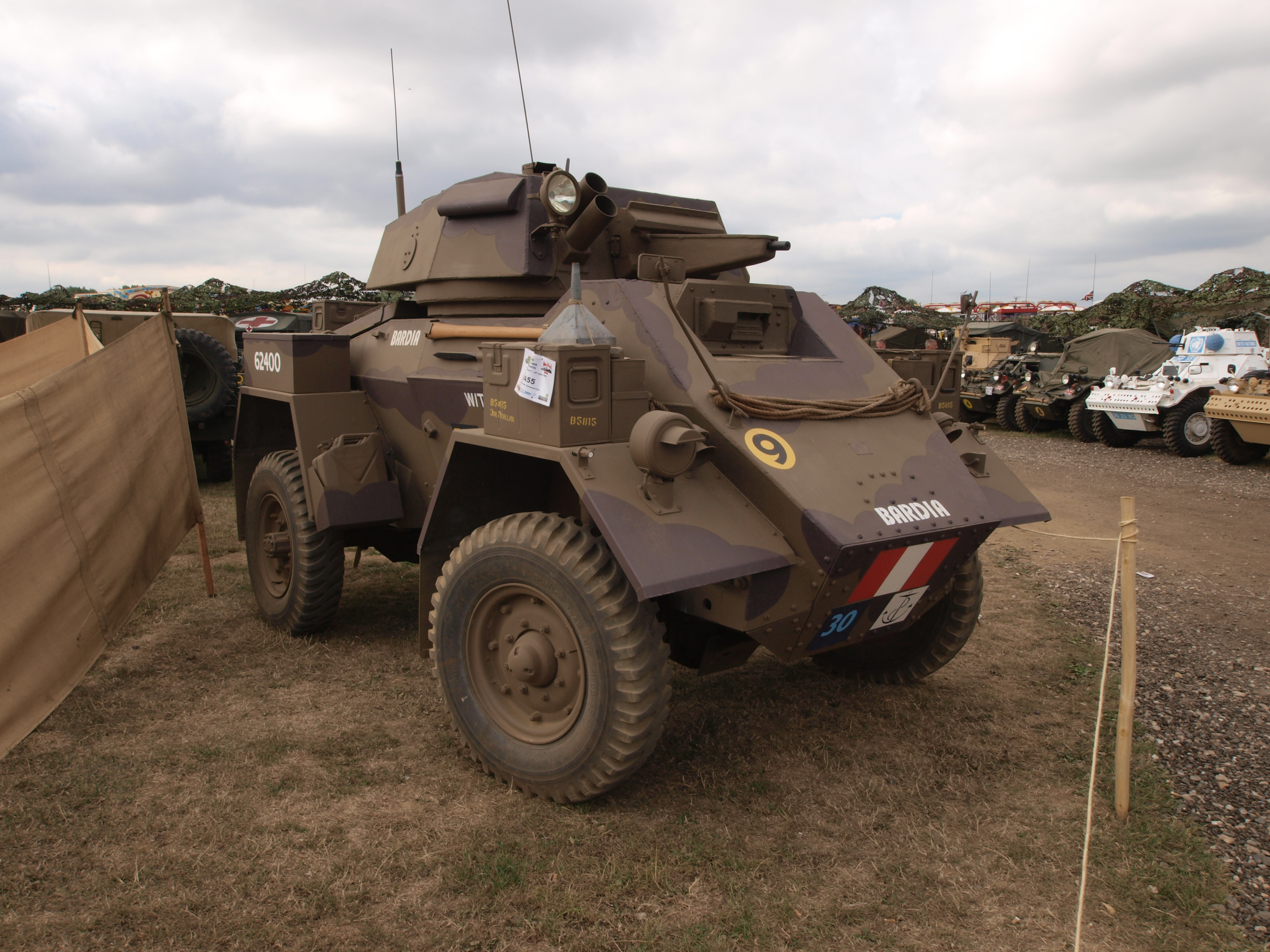
- Fox Mark I
- Type: Armoured car
- Place of origin: Canada

Service history
- Used by: British Commonwealth and associated foreign units during the Second World War, Portugal, Netherlands and Indonesia post war.
- Wars: Second World War; Portuguese Colonial War

Specifications
- Mass: 8 t
- Length: 4.6 m (15 ft 1 in)
- Width: 2.3 m (7 ft 7 in)
- Height: 2.4 m (8 ft)
- Crew: 4
- Armour: up to 15 mm (0.59 in)
- Main armament: 0.50 in (12.7 mm) M2 Browning machine gun
- Secondary armament: 0.30 in (7.62 mm) M1919 Browning machine gun
- Engine: GMC 6-cylinder petrol
- Power/weight: ?
- Suspension: Wheel 4x4
- Operational range: 250 km (160 mi)
- Maximum speed: 71 km/h (44 mph)

The Fox armoured car was a wheeled armoured fighting vehicle produced by Canada in the Second World War.

== History ==
Built by General Motors, Canada, based on a construction of the British Humber armoured car Mk III, adapted to a Canadian Military Pattern truck (CMP) chassis. The turret was manually traversed and fitted with 0.30 in (7.6 mm) and 0.50 in (13 mm) Browning machine guns. (Note: The Humber had a 7.92 mm and 15 mm Besa machine guns) The four man crew consisted of the vehicle commander, the driver, a gunner and a wireless operator. 1,506 vehicles were manufactured.

It saw operations in Italy, UK and India. Among its users was Polish 15th Pułk Ułanów Poznańskich ("Poznań Uhlans Regiment"), fighting in Italy in 1943–1944. After the Second World War many of them went to the Portuguese Army, which used them from 1961 to 1975 in counterinsurgency in Angola, Guinea and Mozambique. The Netherlands, faced with a shortage of Humber armoured cars for use in the Dutch East Indies, acquired 39 Foxes, 34 of which were fitted with Humber Mk. IV turrets (which had a 37 mm gun). The resulting hybrid vehicle, called "Humfox", was immediately successful and popular, and some were passed to the Indonesian Army after independence.

== Former operators ==
- Canada
- Indonesia
- Netherlands
- Portugal

== Surviving vehicles ==
- Karl Smith Collection in Tooele, Utah.
- Shopland Collection, Clevedon, Somerset, UK.
- Robert Gill Collection - three, one displayed in Heeresgeschichtliches Museum, Vienna)
- Cavalry Tank Museum, Ahmednagar, Maharashtra, India
- Canadian Tank Museum / The Ontario Regiment RCAC Museum, Oshawa, Canada
- Canada War Museum, Ottawa, Canada
- Portugal, Museu militar Elvas
- Armoured Weaponry Museum, Poznań, Poland

== See also ==
- Canadian Military Pattern truck
- Rhino heavy armoured car
