= Pz.Sfl. II =

German tank destroyer

- Side view
- Type: Tank destroyer
- Place of origin: Nazi Germany

Service history
- In service: 1942
- Used by: Nazi Germany
- Wars: World War II

Production history
- Designed: 1936—1941
- Manufacturer: Rheinmetall-Borsig
- Produced: 1941
- No. built: 2

Specifications
- Mass: 11 t (11 long tons; 12 short tons)
- Crew: 4
- Armor: 5.5–20 mm (0.22–0.79 in)
- Main armament: 1 × 7.5 cm (3 in) Kanone L/41
- Engine: 4.7 L (290 cu in) 6-cylinder, water-cooled Maybach HL 45; 150 hp (110 kW)
- Maximum speed: 50 km/h (31 mph)

The Panzer-Selbstfahrlafette II, or in full, 7.5 cm Kanone L/41 auf Zugkraftwagen 5t (HKp 902), was a half-track German tank destroyer used during World War II. Only two prototypes were built and sent to North Africa for troop trials. Neither survived the war.

== Design and description ==
Development began in 1936 when Büssing-NAG was given a contract to develop an advanced half-track chassis with a rear-mounted engine specifically designed for use as a tank destroyer. Four prototypes of the HKp 902 chassis were built, two of which had Rheinmetall-Borsig's 7.5-centimetre (3 in) L/40.8 gun mounted in an open-topped, low-profile turret.

The gun had an elevation range between −8° and +20°. It fired a 6.8 kg (15 lb) K.Gr. rot Pz. (APCBC) shell with a muzzle velocity of 685 m/s (2,250 ft/s) and a 5.85 kg (12.9 lb) Sprenggranate (HE) shell at 485 m/s (1,590 ft/s). It carried 35 rounds on board. The armor protection, designed to be proof against armour-piercing 7.92 mm (0.31 in) bullets, was 20 mm (0.79 in) thick on the vehicle's front, 14.5 mm (0.57 in) and 10 mm (0.39 in) on the sides, 10 mm (0.39 in) on the rear, 10.5 mm (0.41 in) on the superstructure roof and 5.5 mm (0.22 in) on the belly.

== Service history ==
The two prototypes were completed in 1941 and they were organized into a platoon for troop trials with Panzerjäger-Abteilung ("Anti-Tank Battalion") 605 of the Afrika Korps. The first vehicle was reported received on 17 January 1942 by Panzerjäger-Abteilung 605, but the second was not reported as arrived in Tripoli until 23 February 1942. The platoon was transferred to the Kampfstaffel des Oberbefehlshaber Panzerarmee Afrika (Rommel's personal battle group) on 8 March 1942. Only one vehicle was reported operational on 25 May at the start of Operation Venezia during the Battle of Gazala; the other had been captured by the British, shown in undated photographs. Shortly afterwards, on 5 June, the Kampfstaffel reported that the other vehicle had been lost after knocking out three tanks. No further references were made to the Pz.Sfl. II.

== Sources ==
- Chamberlain, Peter, & Doyle, Hilary L. Thomas L. Jentz (Technical Editor). Encyclopedia of German Tanks of World War Two: A Complete Illustrated Directory of German Battle Tanks, Armoured Cars, Self-propelled Guns, and Semi-tracked Vehicles, 1933–1945. London: Arms and Armour Press, 1978 (revised edition 1993). ISBN 1-85409-214-6
- Jentz, Thomas L. & Doyle, Hilary L Panzerjaeger (3.7 cm Tak to Pz.Sfl.Ic): Development and Employment from 1927 to 1941 (Panzer Tracts No. 7-1) Boyds, Maryland: Panzer Tracts, 2004. ISBN 0-9744862-3-X
