= Rhino heavy armoured car =

Armoured vehicle

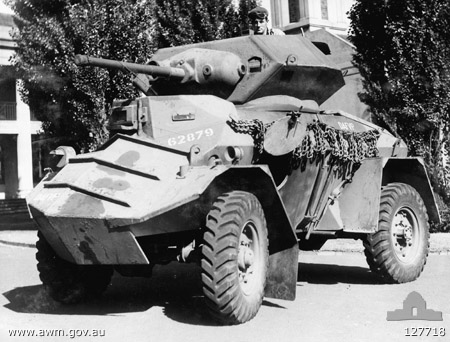
- The prototype Rhino with early heavier hull
- Place of origin: Australia

Specifications
- Mass: 8.5 tonnes (8.4 long tons)
- Length: 4.6 m (15 ft 1 in)
- Width: 2.3 m (7 ft 7 in)
- Height: 2.6 m (8 ft 6 in)
- Crew: 4 (commander, driver, gunner, and loader/radio operator)
- Armour: 30 mm
- Main armament: QF 2-pdr (40 mm) Mk II
- Secondary armament: One 0.303 (7.7 mm) Vickers machine gun
- Engine: GMC 6-cylinder inline
- Suspension: 4x4 leaf spring

The Rhino heavy armoured car, designated Car, Armoured, Heavy (Aust), was an armoured car designed in Australia during the Second World War. Due to enemy action and design problems the project never got beyond a prototype stage.

== History ==
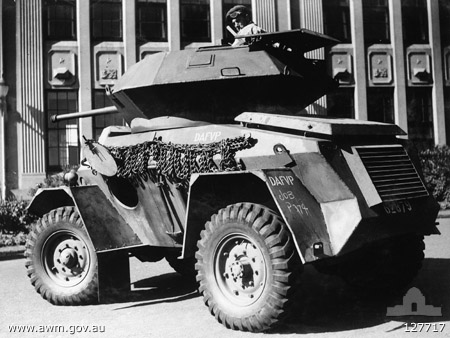
Rear view of the prototype Rhino

At the outbreak of the Second World War, the United Kingdom was unable to meet the needs of the Commonwealth for armoured fighting vehicles. This led many Commonwealth countries to develop their own AFVs.

In mid-to-late 1941 a specification for a heavy armoured car was issued by the Australian Directorate of Armoured Fighting Vehicles Production. Two prototype hulls and turrets were built and tested on the same chassis in 1942. The vehicle suffered from excessive weight and in 1943 the project was cancelled.

The vehicle utilised a Canadian Military Pattern truck chassis and engine produced by General Motors Canada, the rear-engined Model 8446 with GMC Model 270 engine. The same chassis as used for the Canadian Fox Armoured Car. To this a welded armoured body fabricated from Australian Bullet-proof Plate (ABP-3) of 30 mm (1.2 in) thickness to the front and 11 mm (0.43 in) to the sides and rear was fitted. The vehicle was completed by a welded turret with 30 mm all-round protection similar in design to that of the Crusader tank. The armament consisted of a QF 2-pounder Mk IX gun and a coaxial .303-inch Vickers machine gun.

A pilot model of an armoured personnel carrier with an open-topped hull and no turret was also built.
