= Leichttraktor =

German experimental tank designed during the Interwar Period

Leichttraktor Vs.Kfz.31 (Versuchs Kampffahrzeug 31)
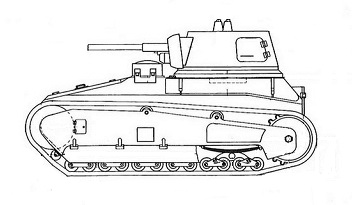
- Rheinmetall variant
- Type: Light tank
- Place of origin: Weimar Republic

Service history
- In service: 1930–1945
- Used by: Weimar Republic; Nazi Germany
- Wars: World War II (Training only)

Production history
- Designed: 1929–1933
- Manufacturer: Krupp, Rheinmetall
- Produced: 1930
- No. built: 4

Specifications
- Mass: Krupp: 8.7 tonnes (9.6 short tons; 8.6 long tons); Rheinmetall: 8.96 tonnes (9.88 short tons; 8.82 long tons)
- Length: Krupp: 4.35 m (14 ft 3 in); Rheinmetall: 4.21 m (13 ft 10 in)
- Width: Krupp: 2.37 m (7 ft 9 in); Rheinmetall: 2.26 m (7 ft 5 in)
- Height: Krupp: 2.35 m (7 ft 9 in); Rheinmetall:2.27 m (7 ft 5 in)
- Crew: 4 (commander, driver, radio operator, and loader)
- Armor: Krupp: top frontal 14 mm, bottom frontal 19 mm, sides 8 + 6 mm, back 14 mm, bottom 5 mm, bonnet 6 mm, front slanting wall of turret 5 mm, turret sides 14 mm, turret rear 14 mm, turret top 5 mm, cupola 14 mm. Turret appears to be 14 mm all around. Rheinmetall: 14 mm frontal
- Main armament: 3.7 cm KwK L/45
- Secondary armament: 7.92×57mm Mauser Dreyse machine gun, cloth belt drum magazine (100 rounds) supply.
- Engine: Daimler-Benz M836 six-cylinder liquid-cooled gasoline engine. 69–99 hp (51–74 kW)
- Suspension: Krupp: Coil spring Rheinmetall: Leaf spring
- Operational range: 137 km (85 mi) on-road
- Maximum speed: 30 km/h (19 mph)

The Leichttraktor (Vs.Kfz.31) was a German experimental tank designed during the Interwar Period.

== History ==
The Leichttraktor was a German experimental tank. After the end of World War I, Germany was restricted in military development by the Treaty of Versailles. However, it was developed in a secret program under the cover name "Traktor". Its engine was mounted inside the front portion of the hull and the turret was mounted above the fighting compartment in the rear of the tank. Both Rheinmetall and Krupp produced prototypes, and in 1928, Rheinmetall's design was chosen and was awarded an order for 289 tanks. However, some time later, the order was cancelled. Krupp models had coil spring suspensions, while Rheinmetall had leaf spring suspensions.

The Germans tested the tank in the Soviet Union under the Treaty of Rapallo – agreed between the USSR and Germany in 1922 under high secrecy and security. The testing facility used from 1926 to 1933 was named Panzertruppenschule Kama, located near Kazan in the Soviet Union. The location was a joint testing ground and tank training ground for the Red Army and Reichswehr. It was codenamed "Kama" from the words Kazan and Malbrandt because the testing grounds were near Kazan and Oberstleutnant Malbrandt was assigned to select the location for testing.

Leichter Traktor ("Light tractor") was a cover name for all three medium tank designs produced there. In the early years of World War II it was used as a training tank. Although these designs were not used in actual warfare, they gave a good intuition on how to build tanks when Germany had previously only made one official tank, the A7V, and this design led to the creation of the Panzer I.
