= T18 Howitzer Motor Carriage =

WW2 US self-propelled gun

T18 howitzer motor carriage
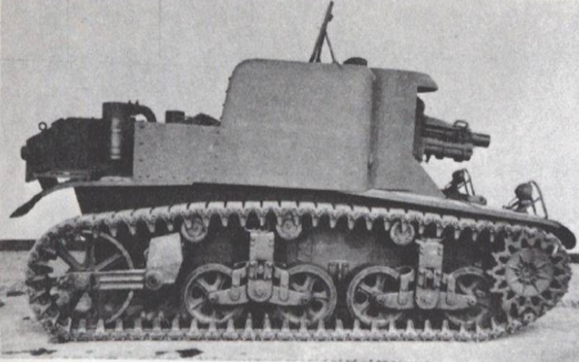
- A contemporary photo of the T18 howitzer motor carriage
- Type: Self-propelled gun
- Place of origin: United States

Production history
- Designer: Firestone Defense Division
- Designed: 1941–1942
- Manufacturer: Firestone Tire and Rubber Co.
- No. built: 2 prototypes

Specifications
- Main armament: M1A1 75 mm pack howitzer

The T18 howitzer motor carriage, or T18 HMC, was an American self-propelled gun. Its development started in September 1941 as a close-support vehicle using the M3 Stuart's chassis. A 75 mm howitzer was mounted on the right front of the vehicle. The gun mount was adapted from the M3 Grant. Two prototypes were produced by Firestone and then sent to the Aberdeen Proving Ground. However, they were unsatisfactory because of their high superstructure and nose weight. Because the Army disliked the high superstructure and nearly vertical armor, the T18 was abandoned in 1942, and soon started a new turreted project, the T41 75 mm HMC, also known as the howitzer motor carriage M8.

Later, the prototypes were kept on display in the Aberdeen Proving Ground until they were destroyed in 1947.

== Development ==
The development started in September 1941 with a requirement for a close-support vehicle based upon the M3 Stuart's chassis, but it was made of a mild steel superstructure. A 75 mm Pack Howitzer was mounted on the right of the glacis plate of the vehicle. The gun mount was modeled from the M3 Lee's 75 mm gun's mount.

Two prototypes were produced and sent to Aberdeen Proving Grounds. They were unsatisfactory because of their heavy nose weight. By the time the first pilot model was midway into being completed, the project was canceled since the army disliked the high superstructure, nose weight, and nearly vertical armor. The project was soon superseded by the T41 project. Later, the prototypes were kept on display in the Aberdeen Proving Ground until they were destroyed in 1947.
