= 10.5 cm K gepanzerte Selbstfahrlafette =

German self-propelled heavy assault gun

10.5 cm K gepanzerte Selbstfahrlafette Pz.Sfl.IVa/Dicker Max
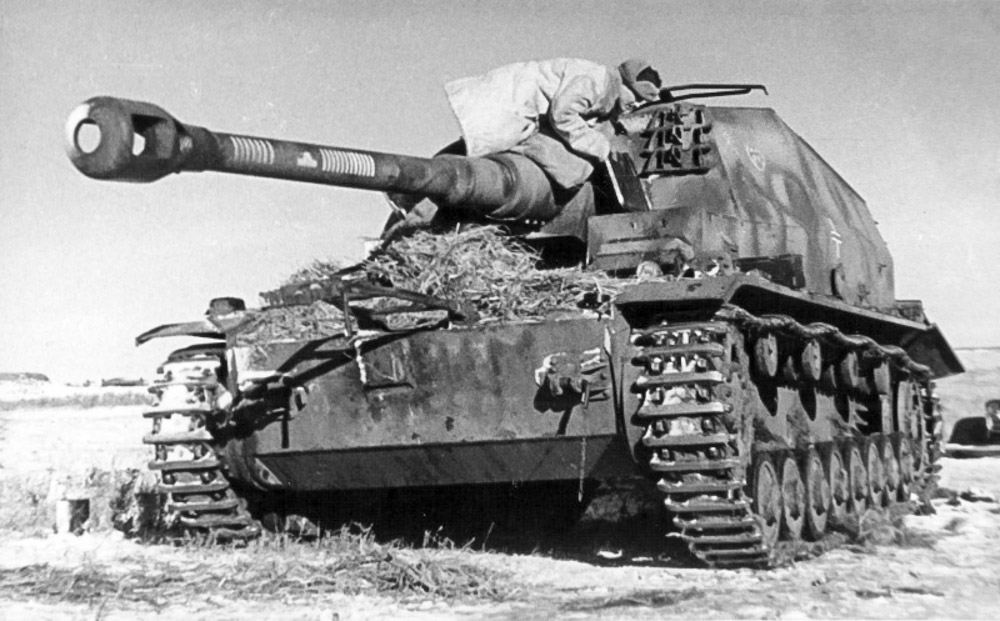
- A 10.5 cm K gepanzerte Selbstfahrlafette/Dicker Max abandoned on the Eastern Front
- Type: Heavy assault gun
- Place of origin: Nazi Germany

Service history
- In service: 1941—1942
- Used by: Nazi Germany
- Wars: World War II

Production history
- Designer: Krupp
- Designed: 1939—1941
- Manufacturer: Krupp
- Produced: 1941
- No. built: 2

Specifications
- Mass: 22 t (22 long tons; 24 short tons)
- Length: 5.8 m (19 ft 0 in) excluding gun
- Width: 2.86 m (9 ft 5 in)
- Height: 2.53 m (8 ft 4 in)
- Crew: 5
- Armor: 10–50 mm (0.4–2.0 in)
- Main armament: 1 × 10.5 cm schwere Kanone 18
- Engine: 6.6 L (400 cu in), 6-cylinder, water-cooled Maybach HL66P; 180 hp (130 kW)
- Power/weight: 8.2 hp/ton
- Transmission: ZF SSG 46
- Suspension: Leaf-spring
- Ground clearance: 40 cm (16 in)
- Operational range: 170 km (110 mi)
- Maximum speed: 27 km/h (17 mph)

The 10.5 cm K gepanzerte Selbstfahrlafette (10.5 cm gun on armoured self-propelled mount), also known as the Panzer Selbstfahrlafette IV Ausf. A (Pz.Sfl. IVa) (Self-propelled anti-tank gun IV model A) was a prototype self-propelled gun used by Nazi Germany during World War II. Although it was originally designed as a Schartenbrecher ("bunker buster") for use against the French Maginot Line defences, following the defeat of France in 1940, it was evaluated for use as a tank destroyer on the Eastern Front.

== Development ==
It was intended to be used against bunkers at ranges beyond which the bunker could return fire. Development by Krupp began in 1939. With the conquest of France complete the design was without a purpose so it was suggested that it be used as a heavy tank destroyer. Two prototypes were ordered, completed in January 1941 and demonstrated in front of Hitler on 31 March 1941. If troop trials were successful it was estimated that series production could begin in early 1942.

== Description ==
Dicker Max

The 10.5 cm K (gp. Sfl.) was built on a heavily modified Panzerkampfwagen IV Ausf. E chassis with the turret removed and an open-topped superstructure added to house the main gun. The forward glacis plate was of 50-millimetre (2.0 in) face-hardened armour at 15° from the vertical while the sides were 20 mm (0.8 in) thick. The vehicle's most curious feature was armored compartments provided in the rear of the vehicle to protect the loaders against attack from aircraft. Similarly the ammunition bins holding 26 rounds for the main gun had thin armored covers on top. Another oddity was the fake driver's compartment on the right side of the vehicle that matched the real one projecting forward from the front superstructure on the left.

Although the main gun was intended to engage enemy armoured fighting vehicles it could only traverse 8° to the left and right, depress 15° and elevate 10°. A muzzle brake was fitted to reduce recoil forces and a travel lock was fitted on the front deck to secure the gun during movement. For self-defense the crew carried three 9 mm (0.35 in) MP 40s with 576 rounds of ammunition. A Selbstfahrlafetten-Zielfernrohr (Sfl. Z.F.) 1 gunsight was used by the gunner, a binocular Turmspähfernrohr (T.S.F.) periscope was fitted for use by the commander, and each loader was provided with a binocular Scherenfernrohr on a pivoting arm.

Throughout most of its development it was known as 10 cm K. (Pz. Sfl. IVa), but was redesignated 10.5 cm K (gp. Sfl.) on 13 August 1941, and was also colloquially known as Dicker Max ("Thick" or "Fat" Max).

In the two prototype vehicles the V-12 Maybach HL120 engine of the Panzer IV was replaced by a lighter inline 6 Maybach HL66P engine. Krupp had considered using the suspension and running gear of the Panzerkampfwagen III as it offered increased maneuverability due to a shorter length of track in contact with the ground, less rolling resistance, softer springs and greater deflection of the suspension.

== Combat history ==
For combat trials the two prototypes were assigned to Panzerjäger Abteilung ("Anti-tank Battalion") 521 during the invasion of the Soviet Union. One accidentally caught fire and was completely destroyed by the detonation of its ammunition, but the other fought successfully until the end of 1941. It was rebuilt by Krupp during the first half of 1942 and returned to the 521st in time to participate in Case Blue, the 1942 summer offensive in Russia. It was not reported operational in reports made by the battalion in November–December 1942.

A report of 26 July 1941 commented on the vehicle:

This Sfl. (self-propelled vehicle) is not sufficiently maneuverable for employment in a Vorausabteilung (lead unit). The limited traverse makes it necessary to turn the entire vehicle to aim at targets. This takes considerable time when done repeatedly, especially off-road because of the heavy vehicle and weak engine. In addition, because of its armor layout - only thick in the front and 50 mm lower in the back - it was built for frontal use. The vehicle can be shot into from the side and rear. Employment in a Vorausabteilung requires the ability to quickly engage targets in every direction.

The gun has proven itself capable of supporting an infantry attack from an open firing position by direct fire as in the Szczara crossing. It is not possible to observe our own shots because of large dust clouds raised in front of the gun. The Sfl. must alternatively observe each other's fire or an observation post must be established off to one side, manned by a Richtkreis-Uffiz. (gunner officer) familiar with the crew. Because of its size, lack of mobility, and large dust cloud raised when firing, in the future the Sfl. will only shoot Sprenggranaten (HE) by indirect fire.

Up to now, the Sfl. has been employed in its specialized tasks - engaging concrete bunkers by direct fire and engaging heavy tanks in coordination with other Panzerabwehrwaffen (anti-tank weapons). Its high penetration ability appears to be suitable for this.

No specific problems have occurred with the engine or transmission. The steering brakes are overstressed. Bolts in the steering slide of one steering brake have torn out three times and the brake bands have had to be changed twice because the rivets were over-heated.

== Sources ==
- Chamberlain, Peter, and Hilary L. Doyle. Thomas L. Jentz (Technical Editor). Encyclopedia of German Tanks of World War Two: A Complete Illustrated Directory of German Battle Tanks, Armoured Cars, Self-propelled Guns, and Semi-tracked Vehicles, 1933–1945. Arms and Armour Press, 1978 (revised edition 1993). ISBN 1-85409-214-6
- Jentz, Thomas L. Panzerjaeger (3.7 cm Tak to Pz. Sfl. Ic): Development and Employment from 1927 to 1941 (Panzer Tracts No. 7-1) Panzer Tracts, 2004. ISBN 0-9744862-3-X
