= PPG tankette =

Soviet tankette prototype of the 1940s

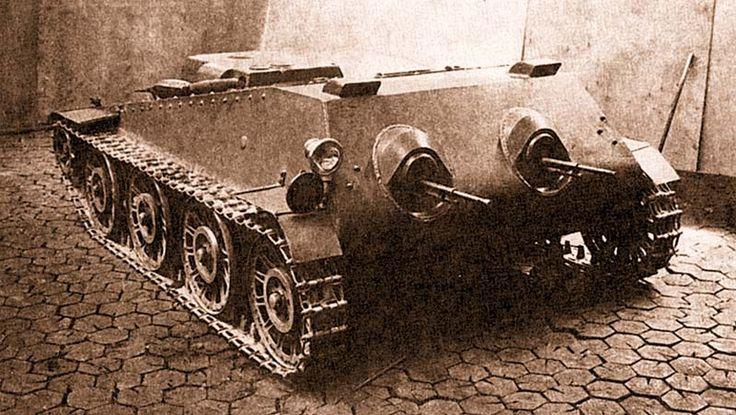
- PPG tankette
- Type: Tankette
- Place of origin: Soviet Union

Production history
- No. built: 100+5 prototypes

Specifications
- Mass: 1.73 tonnes
- Length: 2.5 metres (8 ft 2 in)
- Width: 1.63 metres (5 ft 4 in)
- Height: 0.86 metres (2 ft 10 in)
- Crew: 2
- Armor: 5-8mm (0.197-0.315 in)
- Main armament: 2 x DT machine guns
- Engine: PMZ motorcycle engine 16 horsepower (12 kW)
- Power/weight: 10 hp/tonne
- Suspension: rigid; no suspension
- Operational range: 100km (62 mi)
- Maximum speed: Maximum, road: 18 km/h (11.1 mph) Cross country: 7km/h (4.35 mph)

The PPG tankette (Russian: ППГ; Подвижное пулемётное гнездо, romanized: PPG; Podvizhnoye pulemyotnoye gnezdo; literally "mobile machine-gun nest"), also known by the prototype name Object 217, was a Soviet tankette produced for fighting in the Winter War.

== Intended purpose ==
Soviet infantry took huge losses attacking Finnish fortifications in the Winter War. To compensate, they sometimes assaulted them in armoured sledges towed by tanks. The PPG tankette was an attempt to create an infantry carrier to fulfil this role. About a hundred were produced at the Kirov Factory in Leningrad in 1940 and rushed to the front, but did not make it to Finland in time to be used in combat. The fate of the remaining PPGs is largely unknown, but there are rumours they were used in auxiliary roles in the USSR.

== Specifications ==
The PPG tankette had partial armoured cover of 5 to 8 mm (0.20 to 0.31 in) thickness protecting the front and sides, for two infantrymen riding in a prone position. It was armed with two 7.62mm DT machine guns with 1,575 rounds. The tankette was powered by a PMZ two-stroke, 2-cylinder liquid-cooled petrol engine of 16 hp (12 kW) allowing it to reach a speed of about 18 km/h (11 mph) on roads and 7 km/h (4.3 mph) offroad, while it weighed 1.73 tonnes.

== Tests and failure ==
The first PPG was manufactured in March 1940 and immediately entered factory testing. As a result of these tests, the military doubted the combat value of the new machine. For example, the machine guns had very limited angles of fire, and the dangerous location of the crew in the cabin was not the most comfortable position and negatively affected the combat capability of the machine. In addition, the vehicle was completely powerless against enemy tanks or anti-tank artillery. Although the low silhouette in principle contributed to the survival of the machine, its speed and mobility did not allow for a rapid retreat in case of threat as the tankette could only reach up to 18 km/h. Finally, by March 1940, the fighting had already ended and the need for a tankette was no longer necessary. As a result, the Red Army decided to cancel work on the project, recognizing it as unpromising. A preliminary order for a batch of five experimental tankettes was canceled, the PPG was not accepted and was not used in combat operations.
