= Semovente da 149/40 =

Semovente 149/40
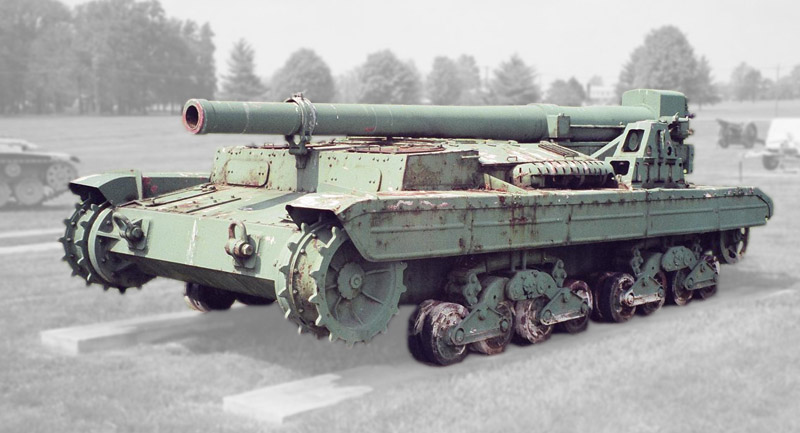
- The Semovente da 149/40 when it was displayed in the US Army Ordnance Museum
- Type: Self-propelled gun
- Place of origin: Italy

Service history
- Wars: World War II (trials)

Production history
- Designer: Ansaldo
- Designed: 1942
- Produced: Late 1942
- No. built: 1

Specifications
- Mass: 24,000 kg (53,000 lb)
- Length: 6.6 m (22 ft)
- Width: 3 m (9.8 ft)
- Height: 2.01 m (6.6 ft)
- Calibre: 149.1 mm (5.87 in)
- Armour: 20-25 mm (front); 14 mm (side); 6 mm (top)
- Main armament: Cannone da 149/40 modello 35
- Secondary armament: None
- Engine: SPA petrol 250 hp (190 kW)
- Power/weight: 10.25 hp/t
- Suspension: leaf spring
- Maximum speed: 21.75 mph (35.00 km/h)

The Semovente da 149/40 was an Italian self-propelled artillery piece designed in 1942. Only a single unit was built; this vehicle was displayed at the US Army Ordnance Museum, Aberdeen, Maryland. It now resides at the U.S. Army Field Artillery Museum at Fort Sill, Oklahoma.

== History ==
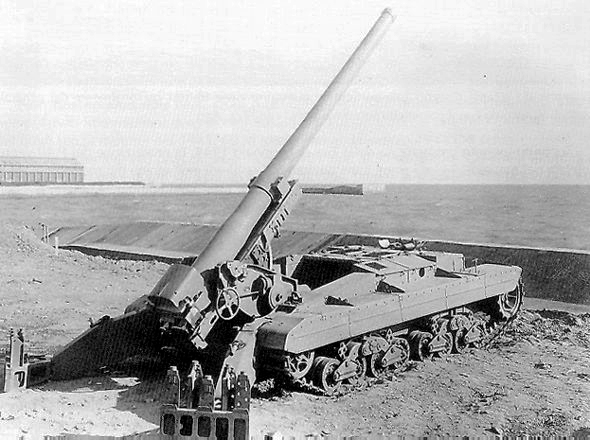

The Italian Army was not far behind the Germans in realizing the need for assault guns and developed a string of vehicles that outwardly resembled the StuG III. These Italian assault guns were produced in appreciable numbers for they were better armoured and quicker to produce than the contemporary Italian tanks. But by the time significant numbers had been issued, Italy was effectively out of the war, and most of these guns fell into German hands. The majority of these semoventi were armed with 75 mm and 105 mm guns and howitzers, but were mostly direct fire weapons. The Italian artillery arm still needed self-propelled artillery weapons to support the armoured formations.

Ansaldo therefore diverted some of its development facilities to design a powerful artillery weapon that could be carried on a tracked chassis. In the end, Ansaldo settled on an existing weapon, the Cannone da 149/40 modello 35 and placed it on a much modified Carro Armato M15/42 tank chassis. The selection of these two pieces of equipment was made in order to produce as good a carriage/weapon combination as possible. The snag however was that the Italian army was already crying out for large numbers of both the gun and tank and Italian industry could not keep up with the demand. This new weapon, the Semovente da 149/40 got off to a shaky start.

The Semovente da 149/40 was a completely unprotected weapon as the long gun barrel was placed on an open mounting carried on the turretless tank chassis. The gun crew stood in the open to serve the gun that had its trunnions mounted right to the rear to absorb some of the recoil forces produced on firing. It was late 1942 before the first prototype was ready for prolonged firing trials, but even before these were over unsuccessful attempts were being made to start production. Before the lines could start rolling the Italians surrendered to the Allies and the Germans took over what was left of the Italian economy. Thus the Semovente da 149/40 prototype remained the sole example of what seemed to be a promising design. The Cannone da 149/40 modello 35 could fire a 46 kg (101 lb) shell to a range of 23,700 metres (25,900 yards), at which distance the lack of protection for the gun crew would have been of relatively little importance.
