= Type 95 heavy tank =

Japanese heavy tank prototype

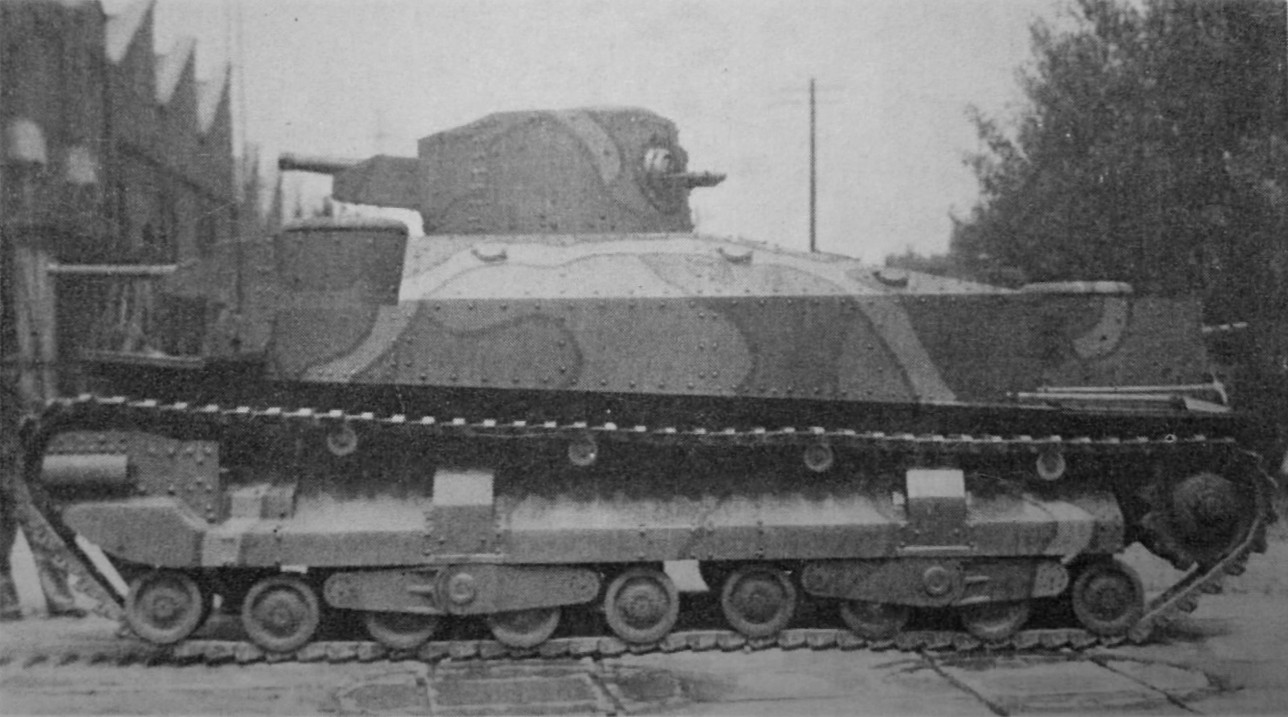
- Type: Heavy tank
- Place of origin: Empire of Japan

Specifications
- Mass: 26 t (29 short tons)
- Length: 6.47 m (21.2 ft)
- Width: 2.7 m (8.9 ft)
- Height: 2.9 m (9.5 ft)
- Crew: 5
- Armor: 12–35 mm
- Main armament: 1x 70 mm tank gun
- Secondary armament: 1x 37 mm tank gun, 2x 6.5 mm MG
- Engine: Inline 6-cylinder engine 290 hp
- Suspension: leaf spring
- Operational range: 110 km
- Maximum speed: 22 km/h (14 mph)

The Type 95 heavy tank (Japanese: 九五式重戦車, kyūgo-shiki jūsensha), also known as the Type 95 Ro-Go, was the final result of Japanese multi-turreted tank design and was in commission during the time period between World War I and World War II. The main armament was a Type 94 70 mm cannon in a central turret, with its secondary front auxiliary turret mounting a 37 mm gun and a 6.5 mm machine gun in the rear auxiliary turret. Four prototypes were produced in 1934.

== History ==
After World War I, major powers around the world quickly adopted the revolutionary design of French Renault FT light tank. One of the most successful features on the Renault FT was a 360-degree rotating turret. While developing new single-turreted tanks more closely based on the Renault FT, many countries, including Japan, also experimented with multi-turreted tank designs.

== Design ==
=== Forerunner Type 91 heavy tank ===
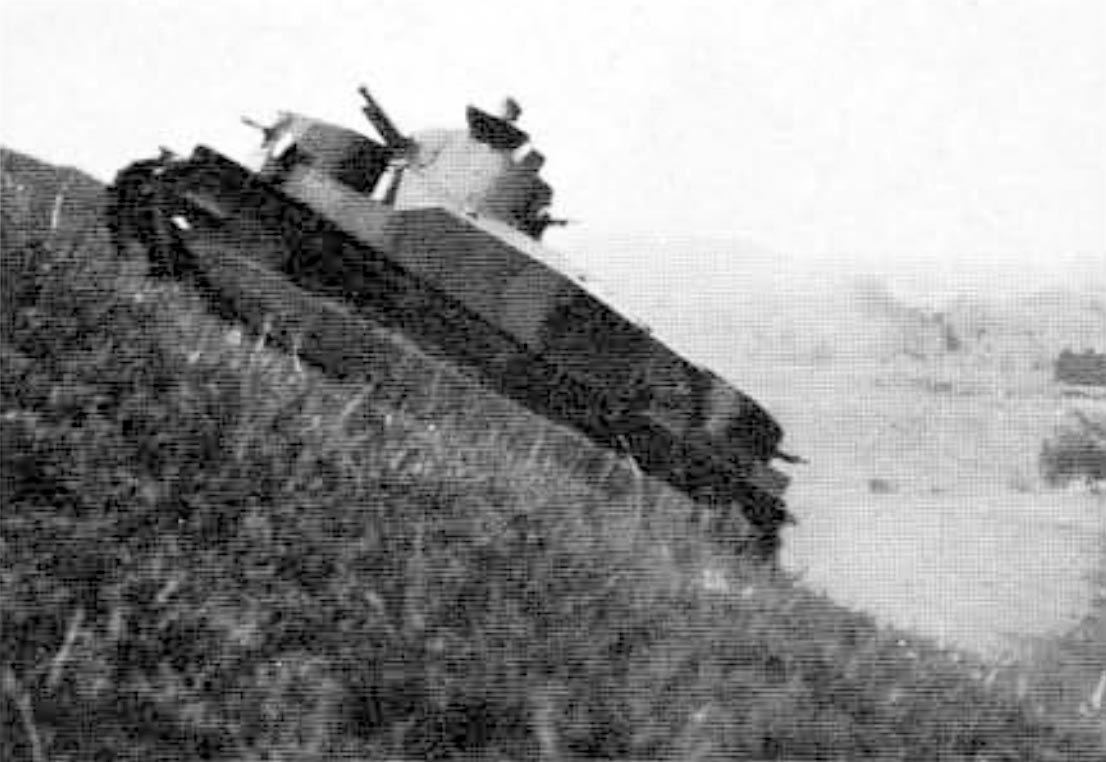
Type 91 heavy tank during field testing

The Imperial Japanese Army made the decision to develop heavy combat vehicles, which was prompted by the increasing threat posed by the Soviet Union, a potential enemy of Japan in East Asia. In 1931, Japan produced a prototype heavy tank that was designated the Type 91 heavy tank. It was an 18-ton, three turret tank with a 6-cylinder gasoline engine producing 224 hp. The Type 91 central turret had a Type 90 57 mm cannon as its main armament and a 6.5 mm machine gun. Its two smaller auxiliary turrets were each armed with a 6.5 mm machine gun. The tank had a maximum armour plate thickness of 17 mm; same as the prior Type 87 Chi-I prototype. It had seventeen road wheels on each side. This first design was not successful, as it was considered to be underpowered, under-armed and lacked sufficient armour. The project was soon canceled. However, this project became a stepping stone in the development of the Type 95 heavy tank.

=== Development of the Type 95 ===
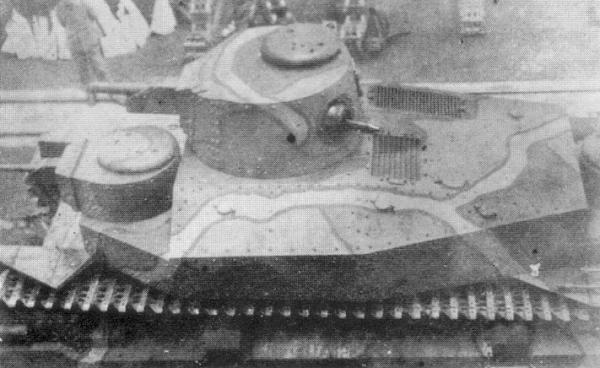
Close-up of the Type 95 turrets

The development of a new multi-turreted tank started in 1932 and was completed in 1934. The overall shape of the Type 95 followed the design of the earlier Type 91, but it had thicker armour and its firepower was significantly improved. A more powerful inline 6-cylinder engine produced 290 horsepower. Its suspension system was modified from that of the Type 91. While still using a leaf spring suspension, it had only nine road wheels on each side.

Mounted in the central turret was the primary weapon, a Type 94 7 cm tank gun specifically designed for the Type 95 heavy tank. The cannon could fire both Type 92 high-explosive shells and Type 95 armor-piercing shells. The gun elevation angle was 20 degrees and gun depression angle was −12 degrees. A 6.5 mm machine gun was also mounted in the main turret. Its two additional turrets gave Type 95 yet more firepower: a Type 94 3.7 cm tank cannon was mounted in the front auxiliary turret, and the rear facing auxiliary turret featured a 6.5 mm machine gun.

It was the largest Japanese tank at the time, weighing in at 26 tonne. Four prototypes were produced in 1934. However, the multi-turreted tank concept was cancelled, so the Type 95 did not go into production. It proved to be a complicated design with poor mobility and had a lower top speed than desired.

== Variants ==
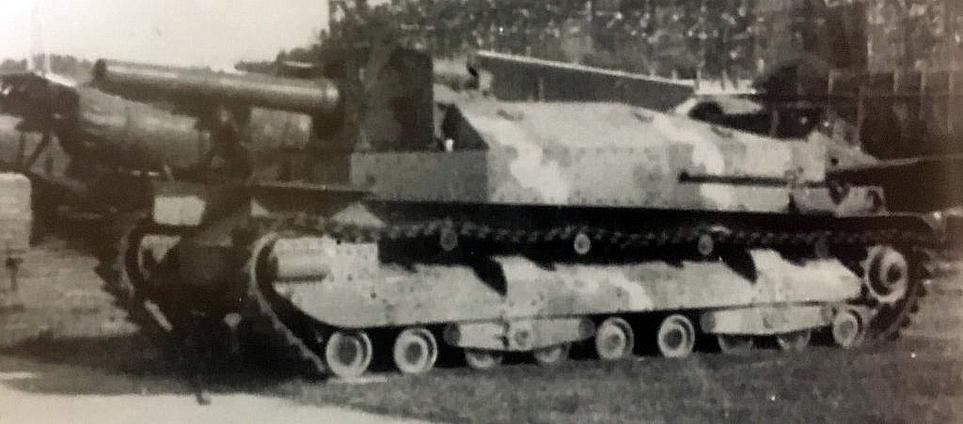
Experimental Hi-Ro Sha self-propelled gun with Type 95 hull taken at Tateyama

Two chassis were later used as platforms for:

- Experimental 10 cm SPG Hi-Ro Sha

An open top self-propelled gun with a front mounted 10 cm cannon (105 mm main gun) on Type 95 heavy tank chassis. A single prototype of the self-propelled gun was built.

- Experimental 10 cm SPG Ji-Ro

A self-propelled gun with a rear mounted Type 92 10 cm cannon (105 mm main gun) in an enclosed casemate on a Type 95 heavy tank chassis, similar to German Elefant. One prototype was built. Originally, the Type 96 15 cm howitzer was considered for mounting on the Ji-Ro, but the plans in relation to the howitzer were abandoned.

== See also ==
- Tanks of Japan
