= Morris light reconnaissance car =

Morris Light Reconnaissance Car (LRC)
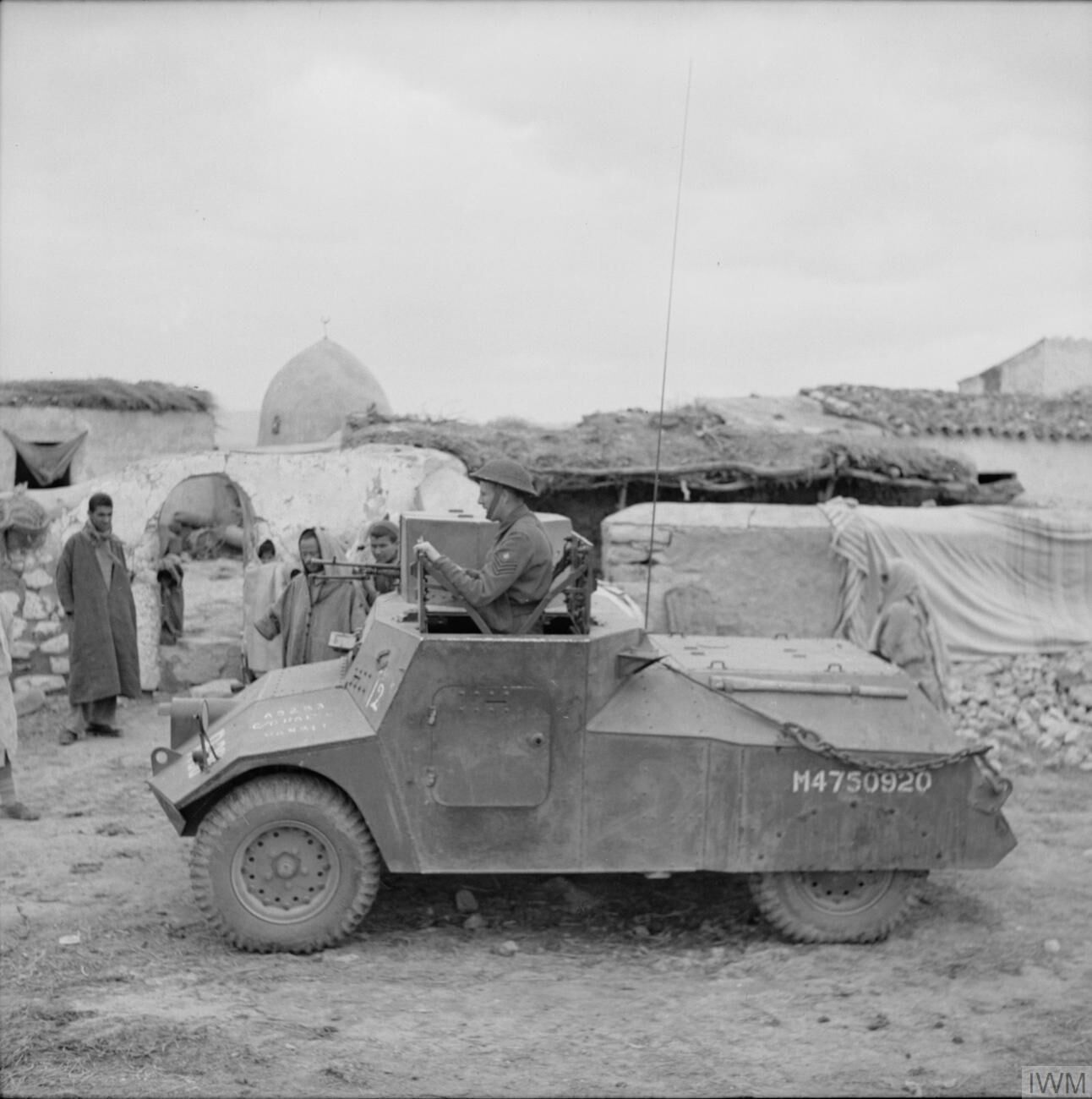
- Morris LRC of the RAF Regiment, Tunisia, 30 March 1943.

Production history
- Manufacturer: Morris
- Produced: 1940-1944
- No. built: 2,200

Specifications
- Mass: 3.7 t
- Length: 13 ft 4 inch (4.06 m)
- Width: 6 ft 8 inch (2.03 m)
- Height: 6 ft 2 inch (1.88 m)
- Crew: 3
- Armour: 8-14 mm
- Main armament: 0.55 in (14 mm) Boys anti-tank rifle
- Secondary armament: 0.303 in (7.7 mm) Bren light machine gun
- Engine: Morris 4-cylinder petrol engine 72 hp (54 kW)
- Power/weight: 24 hp/tonne (14.6 kW/tonne)
- Suspension: Mk I: 4 x 2 wheel Mk II: 4 x 4 wheel
- Operational range: 240 miles (385 km)
- Maximum speed: 50 mph (80 km/h)

Morris Light Reconnaissance Car (LRC) was a British light armoured car for reconnaissance use produced by Morris Motors Limited and used by the British during the Second World War.

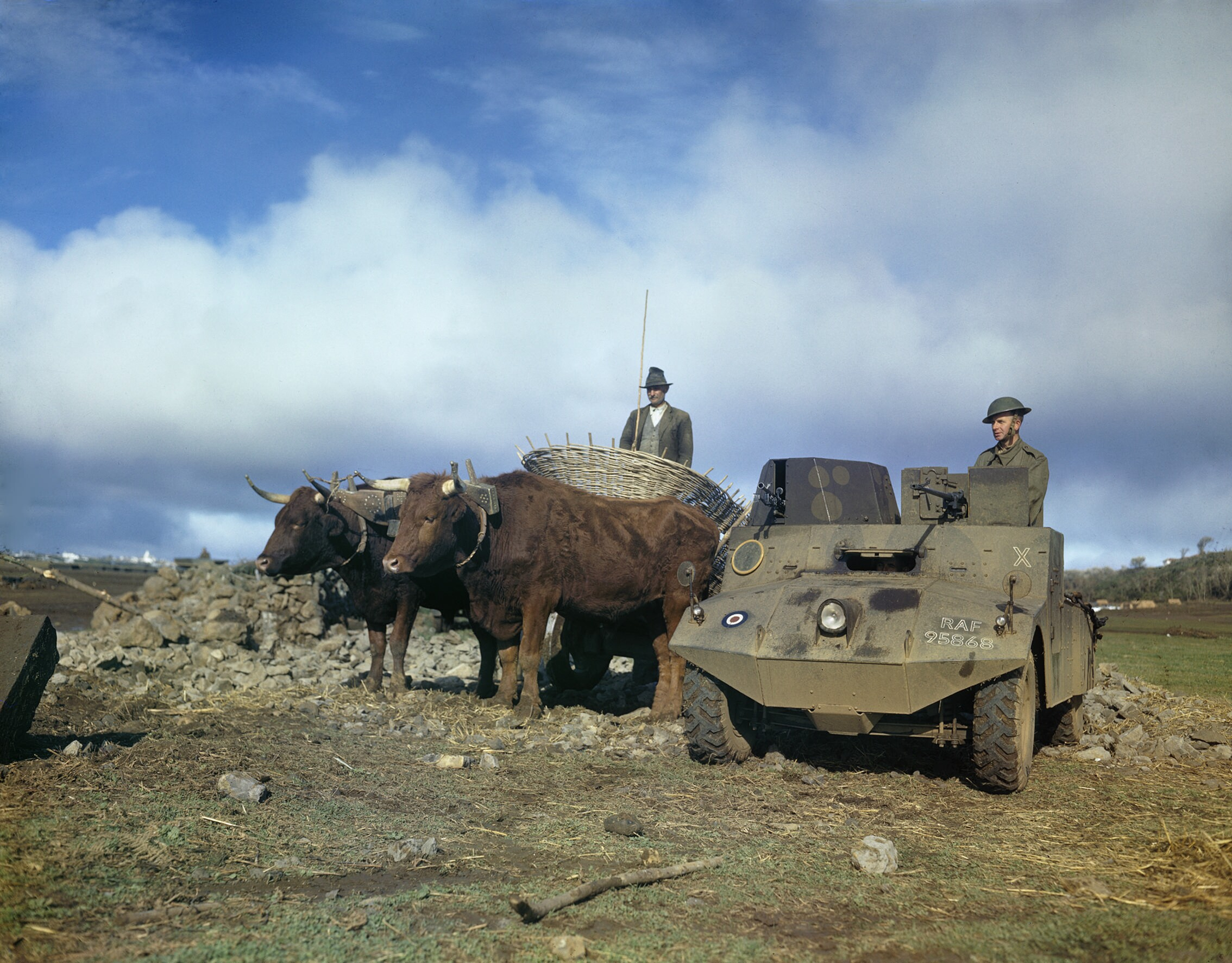
RAF Morris LRC on an airfield in the Azores, January 1944.

The Nuffield Group had been brought in to supplement production of light reconnaissance cars by Standard Motor Company (Beaverette) and Humber (Humber LAC, also known as "Humberette").

The vehicle had an unusual internal arrangement, with the three-man crew sitting side by side by side with the driver in the middle, a crewman manning a small multi-sided turret mounting a Bren light machine gun on the right, and another with a Boys anti-tank rifle (mounted in brackets in the hatches on the hull roof) and access to radio set on the left. From 1940 to 1944, over 2,200 were built.

The vehicle was used in the North African, Italian and in North-West Europe campaigns. Some served with the RAF Regiment, others were given to Polish units.

One of the surviving vehicles is on display at the Imperial War Museum Duxford, another at The Tank Museum, Bovington, and another at the Military Museum at Port Dickson, Malaysia.

== Variants ==
- Mk I - original version.
  - Mk I OP - observation post version. No turret. Equipped with two rangefinders.
- Mk II - four-by-four chassis.
- Morris Experimental Tank - had two turrets. Never reached production.
- Firefly - an experiment by Morris to use 6 pounder guns from the period before the tanks became available to mount them. A 57 mm QF 6 pounder anti-tank gun was mounted in the front of the hull. It was rejected.
- Salamander - A narrow two seat version of the Morris LRC with a turret on top. Prototype built but no production.
- Glanville Fighter Car - A one-seat version of the Morris LRC with two fixed machine guns. Prototype built but no production.
