= 2026 Ahmednagar Municipal Corporation election =

Local elections in Maharashtra, India

2026 Ahilyanagar Municipal Corporation election
- 15 January 2026

All 68 seats in Ahmednagar Municipal Corporation 35 seats needed for a majority
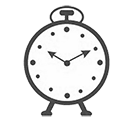

| | First party | Second party | Third party |
|---|---|---|---|
| Party | NCP | BJP | SHS |
| Last election | 18 | 14 | N/A |
| Seats won | 27 | 25 | 10 |
| Seat change | ▲9 | ▲11 | New entry |

The 2026 Ahilyanagar Municipal Corporation election was an election of members to the Ahilyanagar Municipal Corporation which governs Ahilyanagar. The election took place on 15 January 2026 and the counting took place on 16 January 2026. The Nationalist Congress Party emerged as single largest party winning 27 seats and Bharatiya Janata Party came second with 25 seats. NCP's Jyoti Gade was elected as the mayor and BJP's Dhananjay Jadhav as the deputy mayor.

== Schedule ==
=== Poll Event ===
| Poll Event | Schedule |
|---|---|
| Issue of notification of election | 15 December 2025 |
| Last Date for filing nomination | 30 December 2025 |
| Scrutiny of Nominations | 31 December 2025 |
| Withdrawal of Candidature | 2 January 2026 |
| Date of Poll | 15 January 2026 |
| Date of Counting | 16 January 2026 |

== Result ==
| # | Ward | Winner | Party |
|---|---|---|---|
| 1 | 1A | Sagar Borude | NCP |
| 2 | 1B | Sharda Dhawan | BJP |
| 3 | 1C | Deepali Barskar | NCP |
| 4 | 1D | Sampat Barskar | NCP |
| 5 | 2A | Roshni Trimbake | BJP |
| 6 | 2B | Mahesh Tawale | NCP |
| 7 | 2C | Sandhya Pawar | NCP |
| 8 | 2D | Nikhil Ware | BJP |
| 9 | 3A | Shashikant Gade | SS(UBT) |
| 10 | 3B | Jyoti Gade | NCP |
| 11 | 3C | Gauri Borkar | NCP |
| 12 | 3D | Rugved Gandhe | BJP |
| 13 | 4A | Shahnaaz Shaikh | MIM |
| 14 | 4B | Syed Shahbaz Ahmed | MIM |
| 15 | 4C | Minaz Zafar Khan | INC |
| 16 | 4D | Shams Khan | INC |
| 17 | 5A | Kajal Bhosle | NCP |
| 18 | 5B | Dhananjay Jadhav | BJP |
| 19 | 5C | Harpreet Kaur | NCP |
| 20 | 5D | Mohit Punjabi | NCP |
| 21 | 6A | Manoj Dulam | BJP |
| 22 | 6B | Sonabai Shinde | BJP |
| 23 | 6C | Sunita Kulkarni | BJP |
| 24 | 6D | Karan Karale | BJP |
| 25 | 7A | Varsha Sanap | BJP |
| 26 | 7B | Pushpa Borude | BJP |
| 27 | 7C | Vandana Thate | BJP |
| 28 | 7D | Babasaheb Wakale | BJP |
| 29 | 8A | Sunita Bhingardive | NCP |
| 30 | 8B | Ashabai Kathore | BJP |
| 31 | 8C | Navnath Kathore | SHS |
| 32 | 8D | Kumarsinh Wakale | NCP |
| 33 | 9A | Sanjay Shendge | SHS |
| 34 | 9B | Roopali Datrange | SHS |
| 35 | 9C | Vaishali Nalkande | SHS |
| 36 | 9D | Mahesh Londhe | BJP |
| 37 | 10A | Shripad Chindam | BSP |
| 38 | 10B | Sheetal Dhone | BJP |
| 39 | 10C | Mayuri Jadhav | BJP |
| 40 | 10D | Raju Murtadkar | BJP |
| 41 | 11A | Umesh Kawade | SHS |
| 42 | 11B | Sunita Genappa | SHS |
| 43 | 11C | Asha Dagwale | NCP |
| 44 | 11D | Subhash Londhe | BJP |
| 45 | 12A | Mangal Lokhande | SHS |
| 46 | 12B | Surekha Kadam | SHS |
| 47 | 12C | Balasaheb Borate | SHS |
| 48 | 12D | Dattatrey Kavare | SHS |
| 49 | 13A | Suresh Bansode | NCP |
| 50 | 13B | Sujata Padole | NCP |
| 51 | 13C | Anita Shetiya | NCP |
| 52 | 13D | Avinash Ghule | NCP |
| 53 | 14A | Prakash Bhaganagare | NCP |
| 54 | 14B | Sunita Fulsoundar | NCP |
| 55 | 14C | Meena Chopada | NCP |
| 56 | 14D | Ganesh Bhosle | NCP |
| 57 | 15A | Poornima Gavhale | NCP |
| 58 | 15B | Datta Gadalkar | BJP |
| 59 | 15C | Gitanjali Kale | NCP |
| 60 | 15D | Sujay Mohite | BJP |
| 61 | 16A | Sunita Kamble | NCP |
| 62 | 16B | Varsha Kakde | NCP |
| 63 | 16C | Vijay Pathare | BJP |
| 64 | 16D | Amol Yewale | BJP |
| 65 | 17A | Mayur Bhangre | NCP |
| 66 | 17B | Ashwini Londhe | NCP |
| 67 | 17C | Kamal Kotkar | BJP |
| 68 | 17D | Majok Kotkar | BJP |

== See also ==
- 2026 elections in India
- Ahmednagar Municipal Corporation
