= Type 95 Ha-Go light tank =

Type 95 Ha-Gō
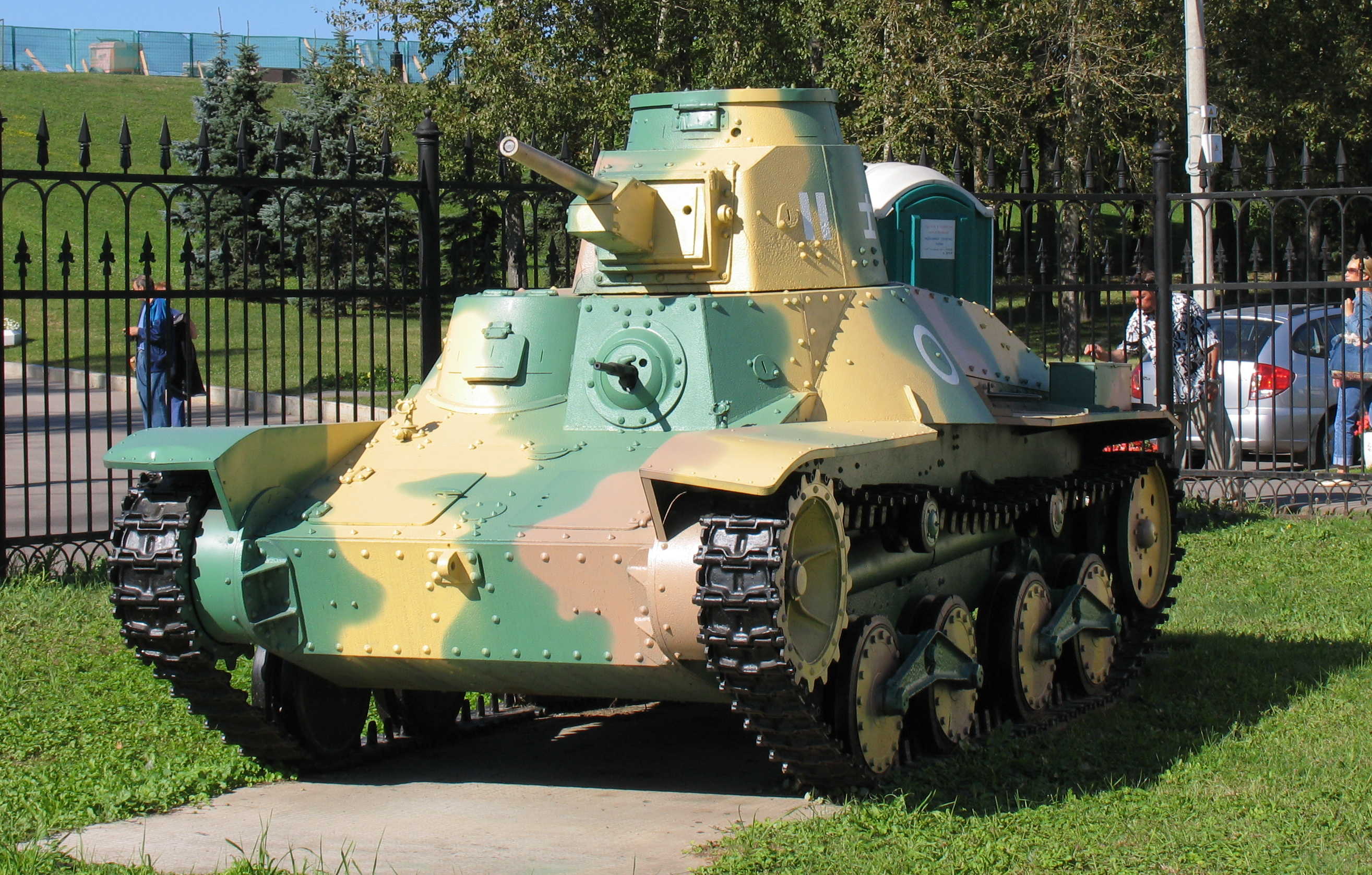
- Type 95 at the Moscow Museum of the Great Patriotic War
- Type: Light tank
- Place of origin: Japan

Service history
- Used by: See Operators
- Wars: Second Sino-Japanese War; Battles of Khalkhin Gol; Second World War; Chinese Civil War

Production history
- Designed: 1933–1934
- Unit cost: 71,000 yen ($19,078 USD) in August 1939, excluding armaments
- Produced: 1936–1943
- No. built: 2,300

Specifications
- Mass: 7.4 t (7.3 long tons; 8.2 short tons)
- Length: 4.38 m (14 ft 4 in)
- Width: 2.06 m (6 ft 9 in)
- Height: 2.13 m (7 ft 0 in)
- Crew: 3
- Armour: 12 mm (turret front, turret sides, turret rear, hull front, hull sides); 6-9 mm (rear and roof)
- Main armament: Type 94 (1934) 37 mm tank gun later version, Type 98 37 mm tank gun
- Secondary armament: 2 × 6.5 mm Type 91 machine guns later version, 2 x 7.7 mm Type 97 machine guns
- Engine: Mitsubishi A6120VDe air-cooled inline 6-cylinder 14.4 L diesel 120 hp (90 kW) at 1800 rpm
- Power/weight: 16 hp/tonne
- Suspension: Bellcrank
- Operational range: 209 kilometers
- Maximum speed: 45 km/h (28 mph) on road

The Type 95 Ha-Gō (九五式軽戦車 ハ号, kyūgo-shiki kei-sensha Ha-Gō) was a light tank used by the Empire of Japan during the Second Sino-Japanese War, at the Battles of Khalkhin Gol against the Soviet Union, and in the Second World War. It proved sufficient against infantry but was not effective against other tanks. Approximately 2,300 were produced, making it the most numerous Japanese armoured fighting vehicle of the Second World War.

== History and development ==
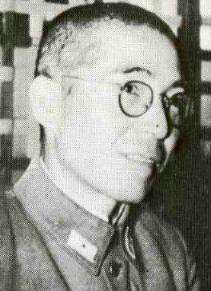
IJA officer Tomio Hara

From early 1930s, the Japanese army began experimenting with a mechanized warfare unit combining infantry with tanks. However, the Type 89 Medium tank could not keep pace with the motorized infantry, which could move at 40 km/h (25 mph) by truck. For transport, tanks could be loaded on train platforms like in any other army of the time. To solve this problem, Tomio Hara of the Army Technical Bureau proposed a new light tank capable of 40 km/h speed and started development of it in 1933.

The prototype of the tank was completed in June 1934 at the Army's Sagami Arsenal. Initial tests were positive, but it was too heavy at 7.5 tons and was reworked to bring the weight down to 6.5 tons. Due to doubts by the infantry as to its capability for infantry support it was tested in Manchuria in the winter of 1934–1935. The reports were favourable and a second prototype built, which was started in June and completed in November 1935.

In 1935, at a meeting in the Army Technical Bureau, the Type 95 was proposed as the main tank for mechanized infantry units. The infantry had concerns that the armor was insufficient but the cavalry indicated that the improved speed and armament compensated for thin armor. The infantry eventually agreed, as the Type 95 was still superior to the alternatives of the Type 92 cavalry tank and Type 94 tankette.

The name Type 95 was based on the year since the beginning of the Empire that the tank was produced (2595); with only the last two digits of the year being used. Sometimes a surname was used to supplement or replace the naming ideograms used for Japanese armored fighting vehicles. The Type 95 had the surname "Ha-Go" (third model) that was given by the designer of the tank, Mitsubishi Heavy Industries. Mitsubishi Heavy Industries started production of the tank in 1936. Mass production began in 1938 with the tank and parts made by several companies; besides Mitsubishi, that included, Niigata Tekkoshō, Dowa Jido Shō, Sagami Arsenal, and Kokura Rikugun Jiohei Shō, as the main contributors.

== Design ==
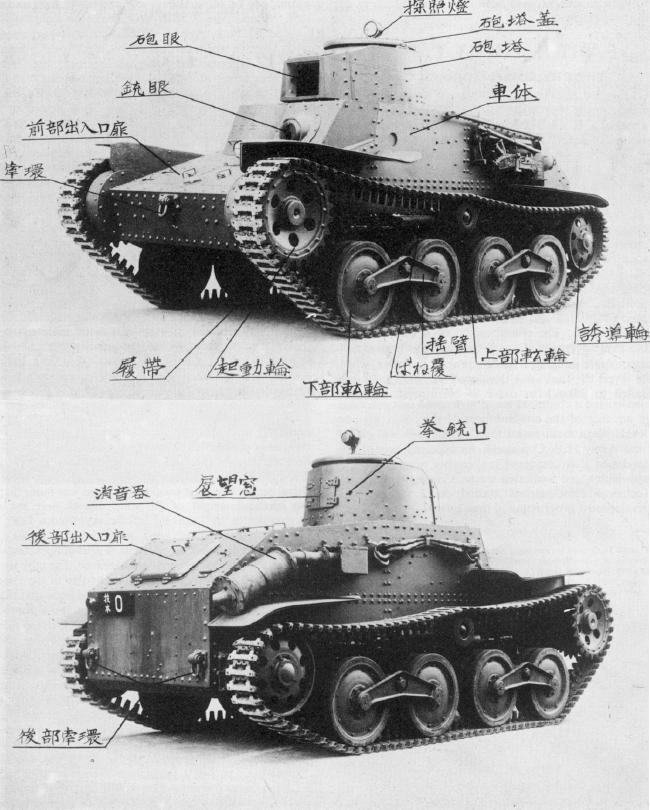
Type 95 light tank Ha-Go prototype, after the weight reduction modification, 1934

The Type 95 Ha-Go had a complement of three crewmen: a commander, a hull machine gunner, and a driver. Only the commander was seated in the turret, hence he was responsible for observation, loading, aiming, firing the main gun, as well as decision-making and commanding the crew.

The primary armament of the initially produced version was a Type 94 (1934) 37 mm tank gun (not to be confused with the Type 94 37 mm anti-tank gun introduced two years later) with a barrel length of 46.1 calibers. It elevated between −15 and +20 degrees. The tank carried two types of 37 mm ammunition, the high-explosive and armor-piercing. For the latter, muzzle velocity was 580 m/s (1,900 ft/s) and armor penetration was 36 mm (1.4 in) at a distance of 275 m (902 ft).

In 1937, the tank was re-armed with a longer barrel 37 mm tank gun, and the original secondary armament of two 6.5 mm Type 91 machine guns were replaced with two 7.7 mm Type 97 light machine guns, one mounted in the hull front and the other in the back of the turret, facing to the rear right (that is, in the five-o-clock direction). The new main gun had greater firepower given its higher muzzle velocity of 675 m/s. The changes in armament caused the weight of the tank to increase to 7.4 tons.

The most characteristic feature of the Type 95 tank was its simple suspension system. Army officer Tomio Hara designed the bellcrank scissors system. This suspension system became standard on the majority of the subsequently designed Japanese tanks. For the Type 95, two paired bogie wheels per side were each suspended on a single bellcrank and connected to a coil spring mounted horizontally outside the hull. The tracks were driven through the front sprockets and there were two return roller wheels on each side. The suspension had troubles early on, with a tendency to pitch on rough ground, and so it was modified with a brace to connect the pairs of bogies. Despite this, the tank continued to give its users a rough ride across any uneven ground. It was provided with an interior layer of asbestos padding separated from the hull with an air gap, to isolate the crew from the sun-heated armor plates, and to protect the crew from injury when the tank moved across rough terrain.

The Type 95 was fitted with a 120 hp (89.5 kW) Mitsubishi A6120VDe air-cooled 6-cylinder diesel engine. It was located in the rear compartment on the right side. The power unit gave it good mobility. Some tanks were fitted with two reflectors in the front of the vehicle for night operations.

== Variants ==
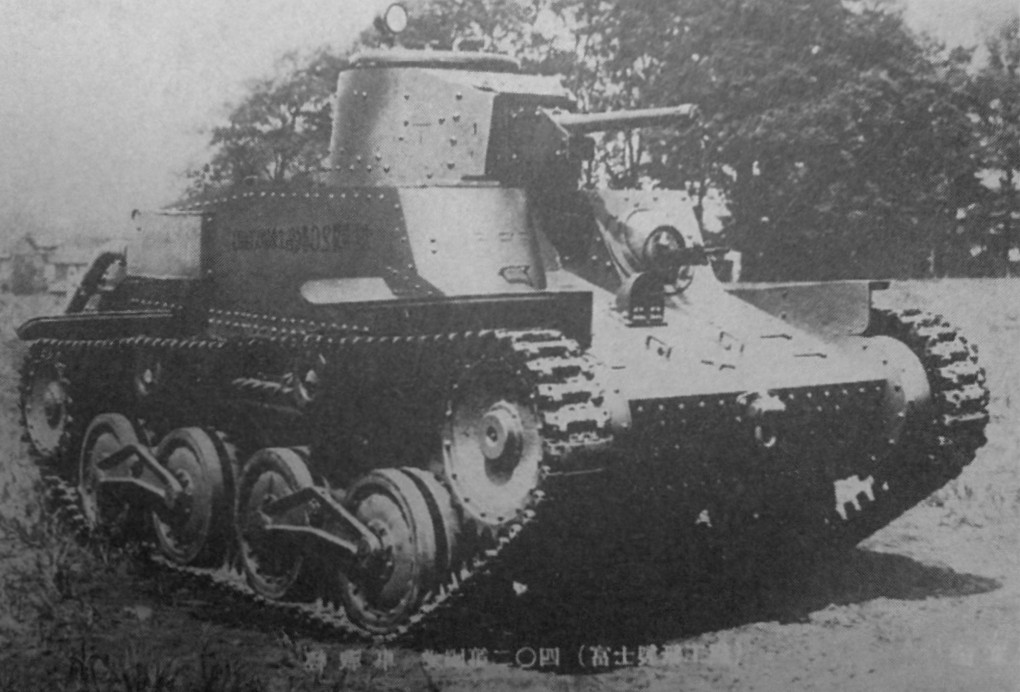
Type 95 light tank Ha-Go 1st prototype, before the weight reduction modification

- Type 95 Ha-Go (early production)

An early production version differed from the most produced model by using less powerful armament: the main gun was 37 mm Type 94 with a barrel length of 36.7 calibers, muzzle velocity of 575 (1900 fps)-600 m/s (2200 fps), and armor penetration of 45 mm at 300 m (1.48 inches at 300 yards). Secondary armament consisted of two Type 91 6.5 mm machine guns. Produced until 1937 with less than 100 made. Used in Manchukuo and China. Of this variant, the very first production tanks used the older 110 hp (82 kW) Mitsubishi engine (as used in the Type 89 I-Go medium tank) and had a top speed of 25 mph (40 km/h).

- Type 95 Ha-Go (Hokuman version)

Due to issues in Manchukuo with sorghum grass in fields getting trapped in the suspension/wheels, the wheel and suspension components were inverted with the addition of small wheels fitted to the bell-crank axis so the tanks could move freely through the grass. This modified version was used in the Battle for Nomohan. It is sometimes informally referred to as the "Manchurian model".

- Type 95 Ha-Go (later production)

Among other improvements to the engine, a longer barrel 37 mm main gun with a muzzle velocity of 675 m/s was introduced, and the secondary armament was changed to two Type 97 7.7 mm machine guns, one in the rear section of the turret and one in the front hull.

- Type 95 Ri-Ki crane vehicle

The Type 95 Ri-Ki was a tracked engineering vehicle. At the rear of the chassis, it had a 3-ton 4.5 meter "boomed crane".

- Type 95 So-Ki armored railroad car

The Type 95 So-Ki was an armored railroad car designed to a requirement of the Kwantung Army for patrolling and guarding remote narrow gauge railway lines. It was fitted with a retractable wheel arrangement underneath to enable it to run on rails. Between 121 and 138 units were manufactured between 1935 and 1943, which operated in both China and Burma.

- Type 2 Ka-Mi amphibious tank

This was the first amphibious tank produced in Japan and was intended for use by the Japanese Special Naval Landing Forces. The chassis was based on the Type 95 Ha-Go and its main armament was the same, a 37 mm tank gun. The pontoons were attached by a system of "small clips" with a release inside the tank, to be engaged once it landed for ground combat operations. The Type 2 Ka-Mi was first used in combat on Guadalcanal in late 1942. Later they were encountered by the United States Marine Corps in the Marshall Islands and Mariana Islands, particularly on Saipan. They were also used during the fighting on the Philippine island of Leyte in late 1944. They were produced from 1942–1944, with only 182 to 184 completed.

- Type 3 Ke-Ri prototype

This was a proposed model with a Type 97 57 mm tank gun as the main armament in a slightly modified Type 95 Ha-Go turret. The chassis was the same as the Type 95 Ha-Go. The light tank had a weight of 7.4 tons and a crew of 3 men. It was determined that the turret was too cramped for the crewmen, once the main gun was installed. A small number of prototypes were produced, however, the design never got past the field-testing stage.

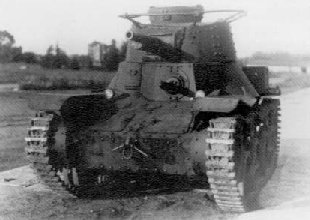
Type 4 Ke-Nu light tank

- Type 4 Ke-Nu conversion

A conversion that replaced the existing Type 95 Ha-Go turret with the larger turret of the Type 97 Chi-Ha, armed with the low-velocity 57 mm tank gun. The conversions were done late in the war, with several estimates stating that approximately 100 units were completed. An exact number of the tanks converted is not known.

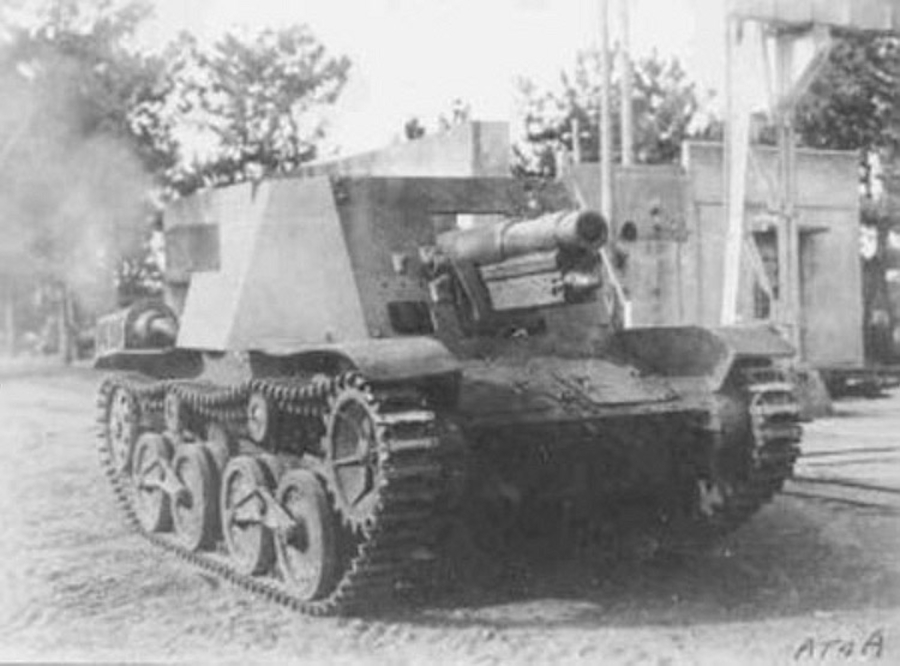
Type 4 Ho-To SPG with a Type 38 12 cm howitzer

- Type 4 Ho-To prototype

The Ho-To was a self-propelled gun on a modified Ha-Go chassis. It mounted a Type 38 12 cm howitzer in an open casemate with frontal and side armour. One prototype was completed.

- Type 5 Ho-Ru prototype

The Ho-Ru was a light tank destroyer similar to the German Hetzer, but armed with the weaker 47 mm main gun in a semi-enclosed casemate. The Type 5 Ho-Ru utilized the chassis of the Type 95 Ha-Go, but its suspension was enlarged to 350 mm track link width. There were two set rows of wheel guide pins, holding a road wheel between them. The sprocket of the driving wheel was the grating type to gear with the wheel guide pins like on the Soviet T-34. Development of the Type 5 Ho-Ru started in February 1945 with only one prototype being completed before the end of the war.

== Combat history ==
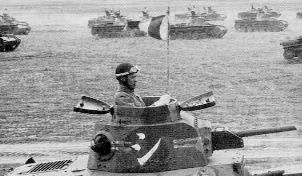
Type 95 Ha-Go showing a flag signal during maneuvers

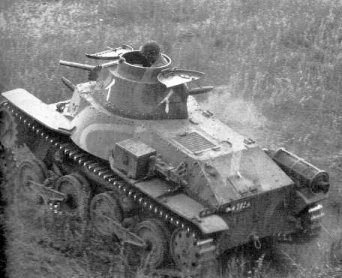
Rear-side view of Type 95 Ha-Go Hokuman version (Manchurian model)

The tank was considered one of the best of its type in 1935, being armed with a 37 mm cannon, and powered by a diesel engine, a fuel considered by some to be superior due to its low volatility. As with most armies in the 1930s the tank, and the light tank in particular, were used primarily to support infantry or serve as cavalry reconnaissance and to a lesser extent, as raiding vehicles. Its speed was about 18 miles per hour (29 km/h) cross country, which was comparable to the M3 Stuart's 20 miles per hour (32 km/h) nearly six years later in 1941. In armor, road speed, and weaponry, the Type 95 was far inferior to the (five years younger) American M3 Stuart light tanks, but the environment of the Philippines (where roads were sparse and tank engagements took place at near point blank range) largely minimized these disadvantages and allowed the Type 95 to be competitive, as its off-road speed and turret rotation were comparable.

Type 95 proved sufficient against opposing infantry in campaigns in Manchuria and China, as the Chinese National Revolutionary Army had only three tank battalions consisting of Vickers export tanks, German PzKpfw I light tanks, and Italian CV33 tankettes to oppose them. However, the Type 95, like the US M3 Stuart, was not designed to fight other tanks, but for infantry support. Due to the IJN's priority in receiving new technology and steel for warship construction, tanks for the IJA and the IJN's SNLF detachments were relegated to receiving what was left. By 1942, Japanese armor remained largely the same as it did in the 1930s, and new tank development was "stymied."

=== Khalkhin Gol (Nomonhan) 1939 ===
Under the mistaken belief that the Red Army was retreating from the area of the Khalkhyn Gol river, the IJA command in Manchuria transferred the 1st Tank Corps, under the command of Lt. Gen. Yasuoka Masaomi to the village of Nomonhan to cut off the retreating Soviets at Khalkhyn Gol. After a two-day journey by rail, the 1st Tank Corps began unloading its 3rd Tank Regiment and 4th Tank Regiment from their trains at Arshaan in Manchuria on 22 June 1939. While the 3rd Tank Regiment was composed primarily of the nearly decade-old Type 89 medium tanks, the 4th Tank Regiment, commanded by 48-year-old Col. Tamada Yoshio, consisted of 35 Type 95 light tanks, eight Type 89s, and three Type 94 tankettes.

From the beginning of Soviet General Zhukov's assumption of command at Nomonhan in June 1939, he had deployed his BT-5 and BT-7 light tanks (Bystrokhodnyi tanks, meaning "high-speed tank") and incorporated them into all of his combined artillery, infantry and armor attacks. Although in the same light tank category as the Type 95, also with three-man crews, and similar dimensions, the BT tanks were nearly twice as heavy, at 13.8 tons but were highly susceptible to close-quarter (tank killer) teams using fire bombs (Molotov cocktails); that was primarily due to their gasoline engines. This being so, Japanese tank crews held a generally low opinion of the Soviet Red Army tanks, but the BT tank's 45 mm gun was a different matter. With a velocity of over 2,000 feet per second (610 m/s), Soviet tanks could penetrate the Japanese tanks at a range of over 1,000 metres (1,100 yd) (the Type 95's 37 mm main gun had a maximum effective range of less than 700 meters); as one Type 95 tank officer put it, "...no sooner did we see the flash, than there would be a hole in our tank! And the Soviets were good shots too!"

On 2 July 1939, at approximately 6:10 pm, Col. Tamada's 4th Tank Regiment of more mobile Type 95 tanks took the lead in front of the medium tanks of the 3rd Tank Regiment, as the 1st Tank Corps launched its first offensive against the Soviet forces at Khalkhin Gol. While the 3rd Tank Regiment passed through Soviet artillery fire, becoming decisively engaged by about 20:00 pm during their movement forward, the 4th Tank Regiment, while avoiding Soviet artillery barrages had advanced in a southeast direction instead of due south, engaging Soviet forces southwest of Uzuru pond. Observing a Soviet artillery battery between himself and his objective, a "junction", Tamada ordered an attack in the darkness. At about 11:00 pm, the 4th Tank moved towards their objective with about six metres (20 ft) between tanks and 30 metres (100 ft) between companies and platoons. Just after midnight, a thunderstorm struck, conveniently exposing the Soviet positions while at the same time masking the advancing 4th Tank Regiment. While at close range, the lightning storm suddenly illuminated the advancing Type 95s, and the Soviet defense line immediately opened fire with heavy machine guns, artillery, BT-7 light tanks, and anti-tank guns. However, since the range was so close, the Soviet artillery could not depress their barrels low enough to hit the tanks, and their shells flew wildly over the advancing tanks. At about 12:20 am Tamada ordered the 4th Tank Regiment to "charge", and by 02:00 am his light tanks had penetrated over 910 metres (1,000 yd) through Soviet lines and knocked out 12 artillery guns.

Japanese losses consisted of one Type 95 light tank, one officer and one enlisted man killed and eight wounded; the 4th Tank had expended approximately 1,100 37 mm and 129 57 mm tank shells, and 16,000 rounds of machine gun ammunition. After the action, the Soviet command acknowledged that 1st Tank Corps armor had reached the Soviet guns.

=== Malaya, Burma, and the Philippines, 1941 to 1942 ===
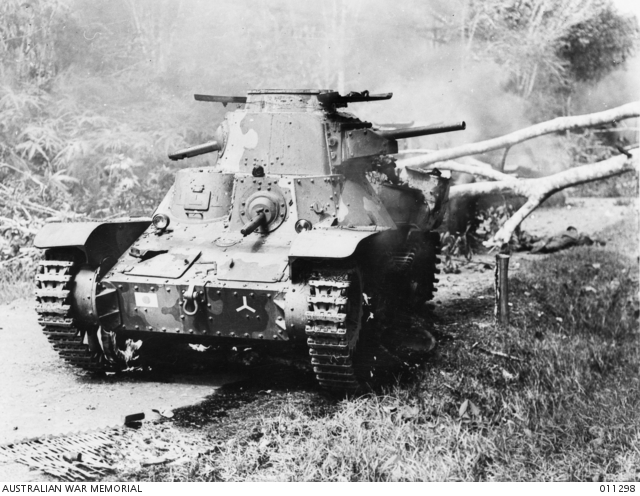
Type 95 Ha-Go tanks destroyed by an Australian 2-pounder anti-tank gun during the Battle of Muar in the Malayan Campaign.

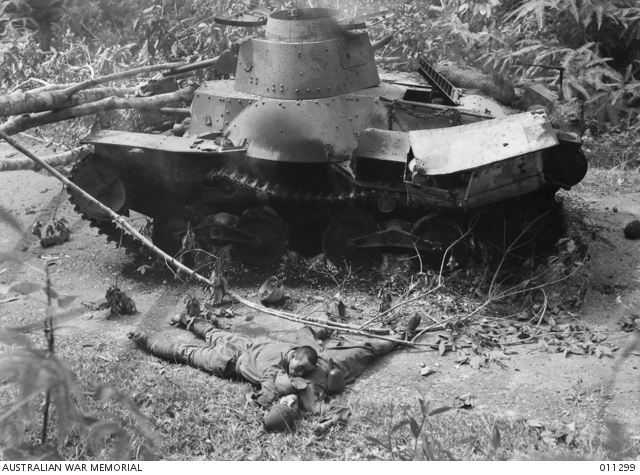
One of six Ha-Go tanks destroyed by an Australian OQF 2-pounder anti-tank gun in the Battle of Muar. The escaping tank crew were killed by Allied infantry.

The United States military had been operating in the Philippines since the Philippine–American War (1899-1902) and the United Kingdom had military bases in Singapore since at least the 1840s; they both had many years of so-called "jungle warfare" experience between them, which no doubt influenced their beliefs that "tanks could not operate in those jungles." On the other hand, the IJA had always been focused upon the Soviet Union and China and had never conducted major military campaigns in tropical (jungle) regions. Facing thick and impenetrable jungles, two experienced and powerful armies, and lacking any jungle combat experience themselves, the IJA's Type 95s, together with Type 97 Chi-Ha medium tanks, led the Japanese assault forces into taking British Malaya and Singapore by 15 February in 1942 and Bataan in the US-held Philippines by April in that same year. The Type 95 proved to be an extremely successful light tank during the early military campaigns of Japan leading into mid-1942. The "rough terrain" did not prove to be a severe obstacle for the generally light Japanese armour. In addition, poor planning on the part of the British Army resulted in very few to practically no tanks being deployed by the UK in British Malaya or the British colony of Burma by December 1941.

=== America's first clash of armor in World War II ===
America's first tank versus tank battle of World War II occurred when Type 95 light tanks of the IJA 4th Tank Regiment engaged a US Army tank platoon, consisting of five brand new M3 Stuart light tanks from "B" company, 192nd Tank Battalion, on 22 December 1941, north of Damortis during the retreat to the Bataan Peninsula in 1941. Both the M3 and Type 95 light tanks were armed with a 37 mm gun, but the M3 was better armored, with 32 mm (1¼ inches) thick turret sides, vs the Type 95's 12 mm thick armor; however, as the US Army's Ballistics Research Lab (BRL) found after conducting its first large study of tank vs tank warfare in 1945, the most important factor in a tank duel was which side spotted the enemy first, fired first, and hit first. In this first engagement the IJA reacted first, destroying the lead M3 as it tried to leave the road. The four remaining American tanks all suffered hits as they retreated.

On 6 June 1942, the Japanese 3rd Special Naval Landing Forces (SNLF) landed on Kiska Island during the Japanese invasion of the Aleutian Islands, part of today's state of Alaska. The SNLF landing was reinforced by Type 95 light tanks from the IJAs 11th Tank Regiment, which became the only enemy tanks to ever land on United States soil. After the U.S./Allied landing of Kiska to recapture the island in August 1943, the U.S. captured two Type 95s and transported them to Aberdeen Proving Ground in Maryland for study and evaluation.

=== Against Australia ===
Two Type 95 tanks were deployed to support the Japanese landing at Milne Bay, New Guinea, in late August 1942. Initially, the tanks proved successful against the lightly armed Australian infantry, whose 'sticky bombs' failed to stick due to the humidity. Although the tanks had proved reliable in the tropical conditions of Malaya, they could not handle the volume of mud caused by intense, almost daily rainfall at Milne Bay. One tank was knocked out by a Boys anti-tank rifle and the other bogged down and was abandoned a few days after the landing.

=== Later service ===
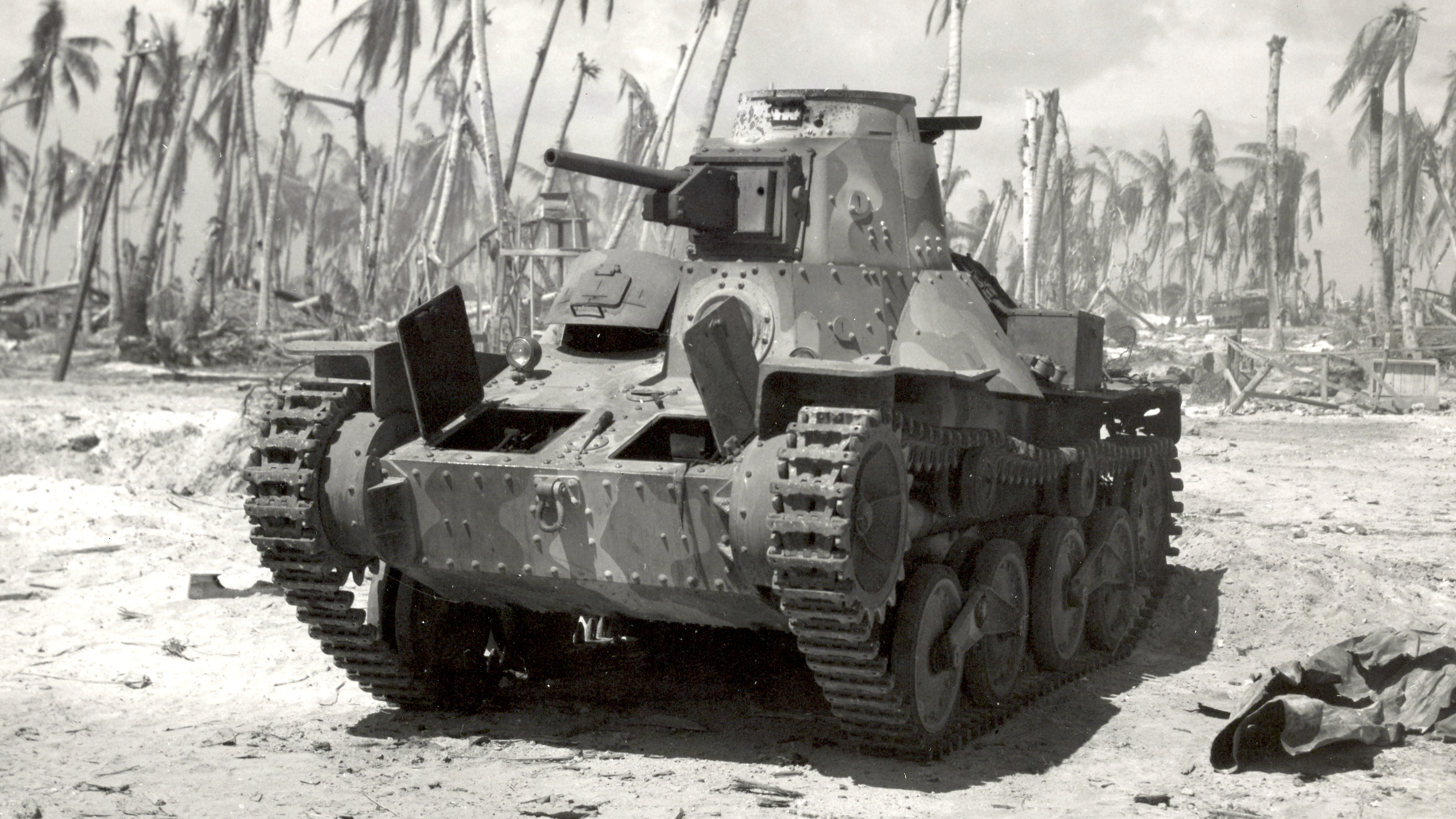
A Type 95 knocked out during the Battle of Tarawa

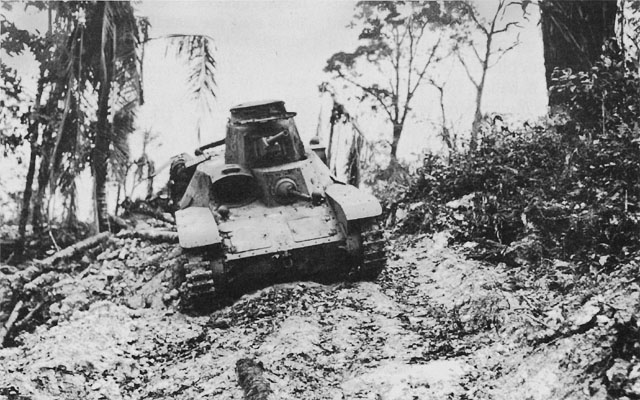
A disabled Type 95 at Biak

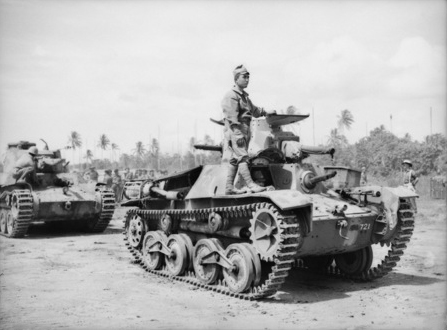
Type 95 Ha-Go tanks in New Britain following the Japanese surrender

The Type 95 first began to show its vulnerability during later battles against British/Commonwealth forces, where the tank's 37 mm gun could not penetrate the armor of the British Matilda infantry tanks which were deployed against them. The thin armor of the Type 95 made it increasingly vulnerable. By 1944, it was already known that the 10-year-old Type 95's firepower was insufficient to take on the newest US tanks, such as the medium M4 Sherman, or the M5 Stuart light tank, although the Type 95 could still give the older M3 Stuart a run for its money at close range.

In August 1942, the US launched its first counter-offensive against Japan, when it landed US Marines on Guadalcanal. The US Marine Corps deployed its 1st Tank Battalion, which was equipped with the only M2A4 light tanks to see combat with US forces during World War II. The M2A4 was the foundation for the M3 Stuart, and both vehicles were nearly identical when viewed side by side; with the primary difference being the rear idler wheel lowered to the ground on the M3. Although the M2A4, being built in 1940, was five years newer than the Type 95, it was the closest US tank in armament and armor to the Type 95; with 25mm (1") thick turret sides vs the 95's 12mm turret sides; and both tanks were equipped with 37mm main guns. Several Type 95s were destroyed or captured by the United States Army during the Battle of Biak in 1944. As the tide of the war turned against Japan, the Type 95s were increasingly expended in banzai charges or were dug-in as pillboxes in static defense positions in the Japanese-occupied islands. During the Battle of Tarawa, seven entrenched Type 95s of the 7th Sasebo SNLF opposed the American landings. Those seven, along with the two on nearby Makin Island, were destroyed. More were destroyed on Parry Island and on Eniwetok. In the Battle of Saipan, Type 95s attacked the Marine beachhead at dawn on 16 June 1944, and were destroyed by tank fire. The Marines had landed the day before with two tank battalions. On the night of 16–17 June, the Japanese made an "all-out counterattack". Leading the attack were 44 tanks of the IJA 9th Tank Regiment. The Type 97s and Type 95s were knocked out by a Marine platoon of M4A2 tanks, several M3 75mm half-tracks, bazookas and 37mm antitank guns. It was the largest Japanese armor attack of the war.

During the Battle of Guam, 29 Type 97 and Type 95 tanks of the IJA 9th Tank Regiment and nine Type 95s of the 24th Tank Company were lost to bazooka fire or M4 tanks. Seven more were destroyed on Tinian on 24 July, and 15 more on Peleliu on 15 September. Likewise, in the Philippines, at least ten Type 95s were destroyed in various engagements on Leyte, and another 20 on Luzon. At the Battle of Okinawa, 13 Type 95s and 14 Type 97 Shinhoto medium tanks of the understrength IJA 27th Tank Regiment faced 800 American tanks of eight US Army and two USMC tank battalions.

=== China-Burma-India theater of operations ===
In 1942 the IJA pushed through Southeast Asia, through Thailand and into Burma, and headed for India. Type 95 light tanks of the IJA 14th Tank Regiment led the way. They engaged the M3 Stuarts of the British 7th Hussars and 2nd Royal Tank Regiment, and as the British retreated towards India, the IJA re-equipped their armoured units, following significant losses of Type 95s in combat, with at least some captured (Note: Hunnicutt states that the British M3s were destroyed (to prevent enemy use) during the British retreat, however the photo on page 397 shows them intact. Likewise, Zaloga states that some were ultimately "re-used" by the enemy.) M3 Stuarts seized from the British. By 1944, the 14th Tank Regiment was effectively starved of its combat supplies due to British deep battle tactics of cutting the IJA's logistical lines, and a final push by the IJA was stopped at Imphal in northeastern India.

In the Battle of Hukawng Valley, Type 95s of the 18th Division were joined by remnants of the 14th Tank Division. They were met with the offensive launched by the India-based Nationalist Chinese Army but the Japanese troops were virtually annihilated with the rest of the division as only 1,700 out of the 12,000 strong Chrysanthemum Division managed to break out.

When the M4 Sherman became available for the British to use in the North Africa campaign, they were able to transfer their M3 Medium tanks to India and Burma, which by then had become obsolete in the fighting in Europe, but the Type 95 was outclassed by these M3 tanks. When the war ended in 1945 and Japan capitulated, many Type 95s were left behind in China. They were used on both the Nationalist and Communist sides during the Chinese Civil War. After the Communists' victory in 1949, the Chinese People's Liberation Army (PLA) continued to use them in their inventory.

=== Manchuria and the Kuril Islands ===
Although tank brigades equipped with the Type 95 were present during the 1945 Soviet invasion of Manchuria, the war ended before the Red Army had engaged their main formations. The only use of the Type 95 in any numbers against Soviet forces was at the Battle of Shumshu during the Invasion of the Kuril Islands, when shortly before the Japanese surrender had been finalized, they formed part of an armored force which unsuccessfully attacked the Soviet beach head but was defeated by their anti-tank guns.

== Survivors ==
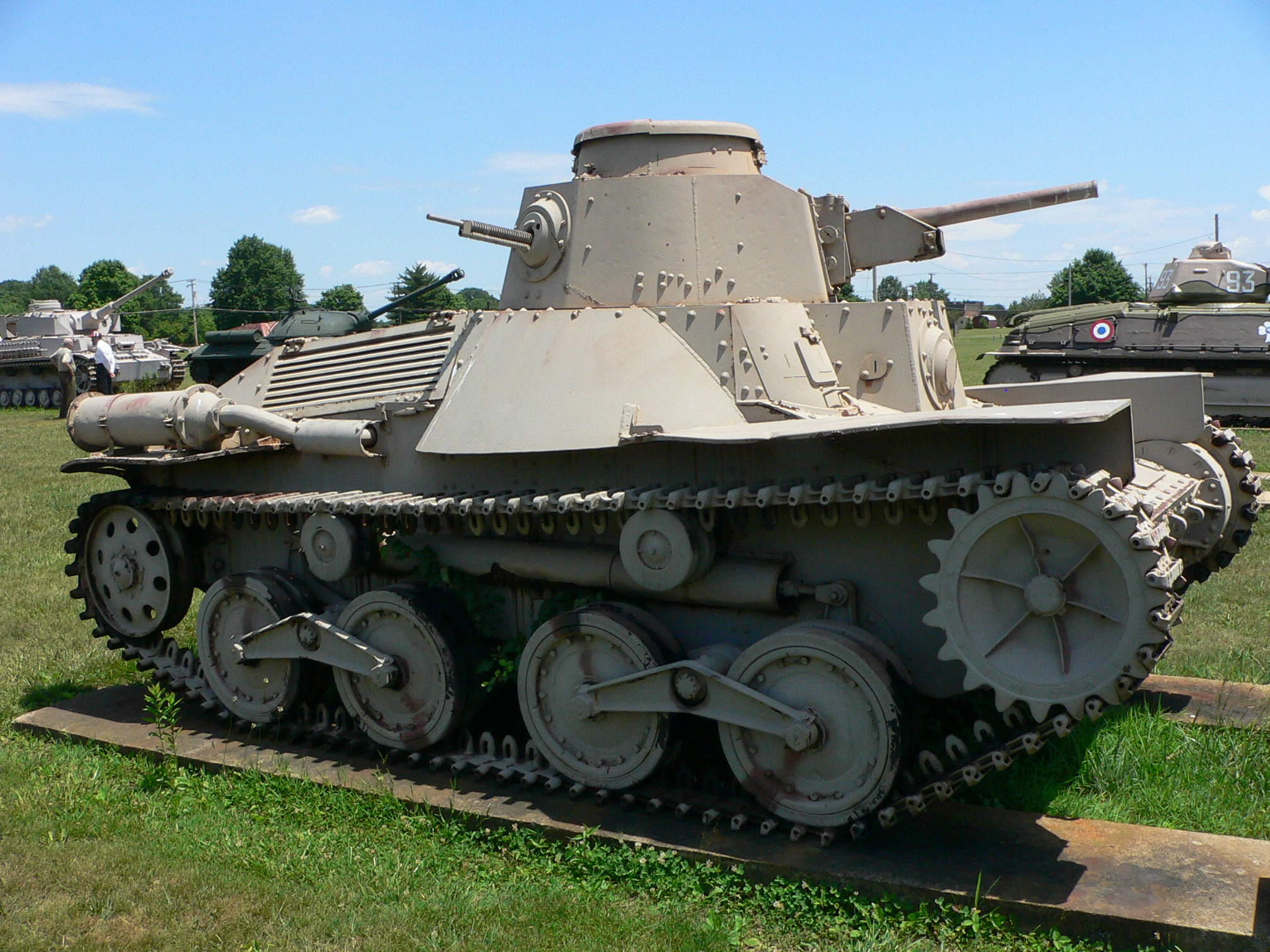
Type 95 Ha-Go on display at the now-defunct United States Army Ordnance Museum

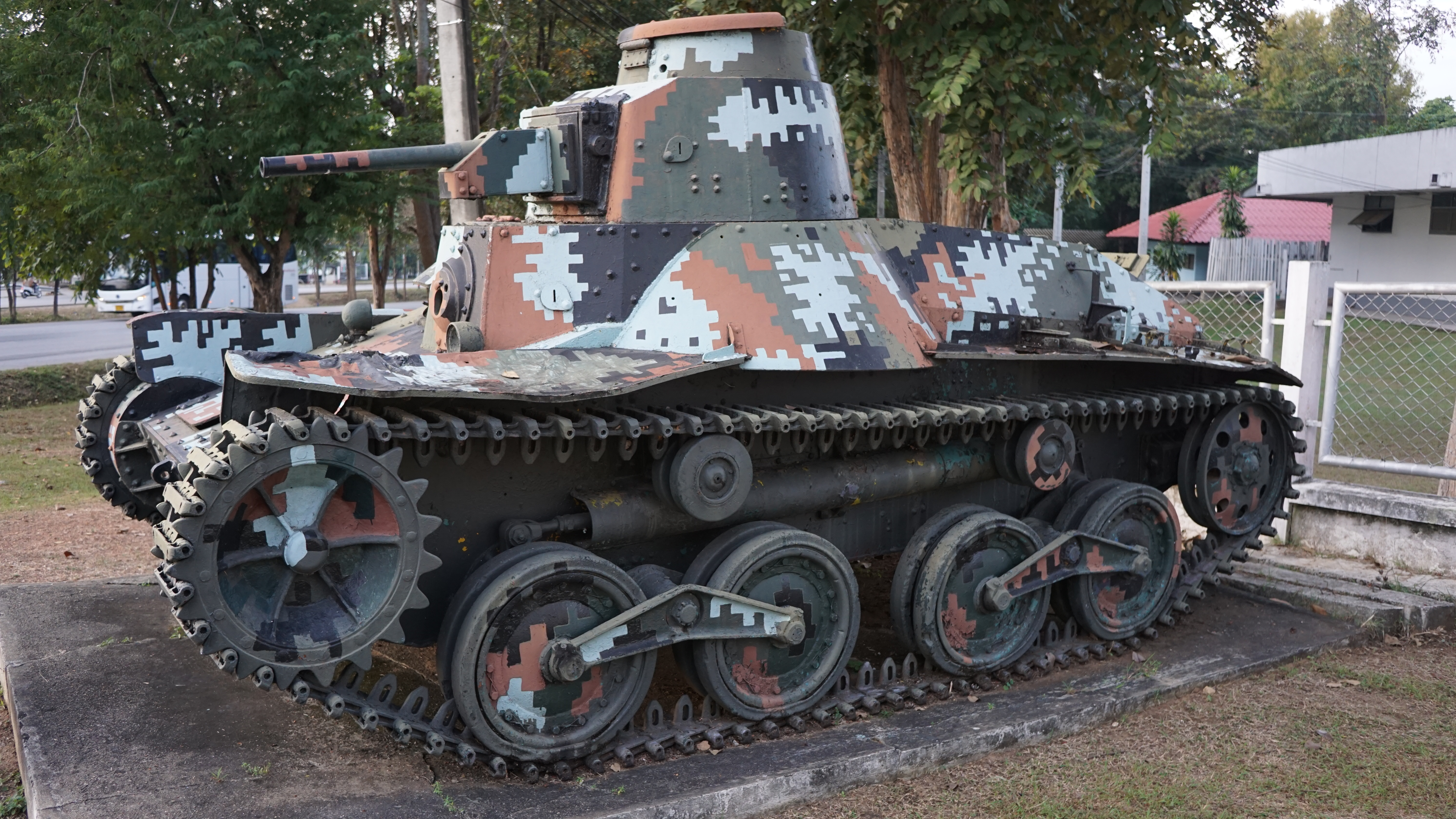
Type 95 on display in front of Surasakmontree Army Camp, Lampang, Thailand, 2016

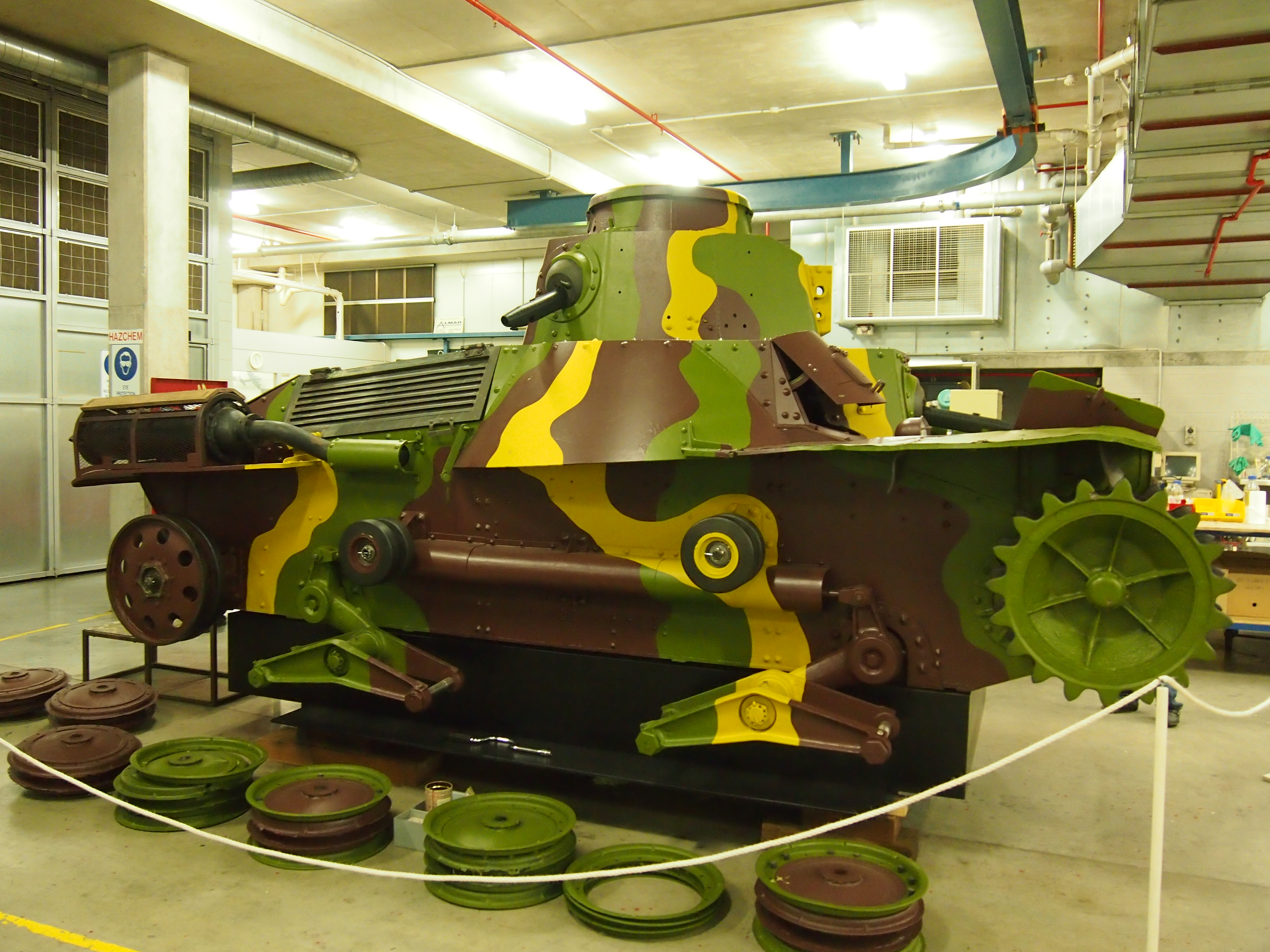
The Australian War Memorial's Type 95 during restoration in 2012

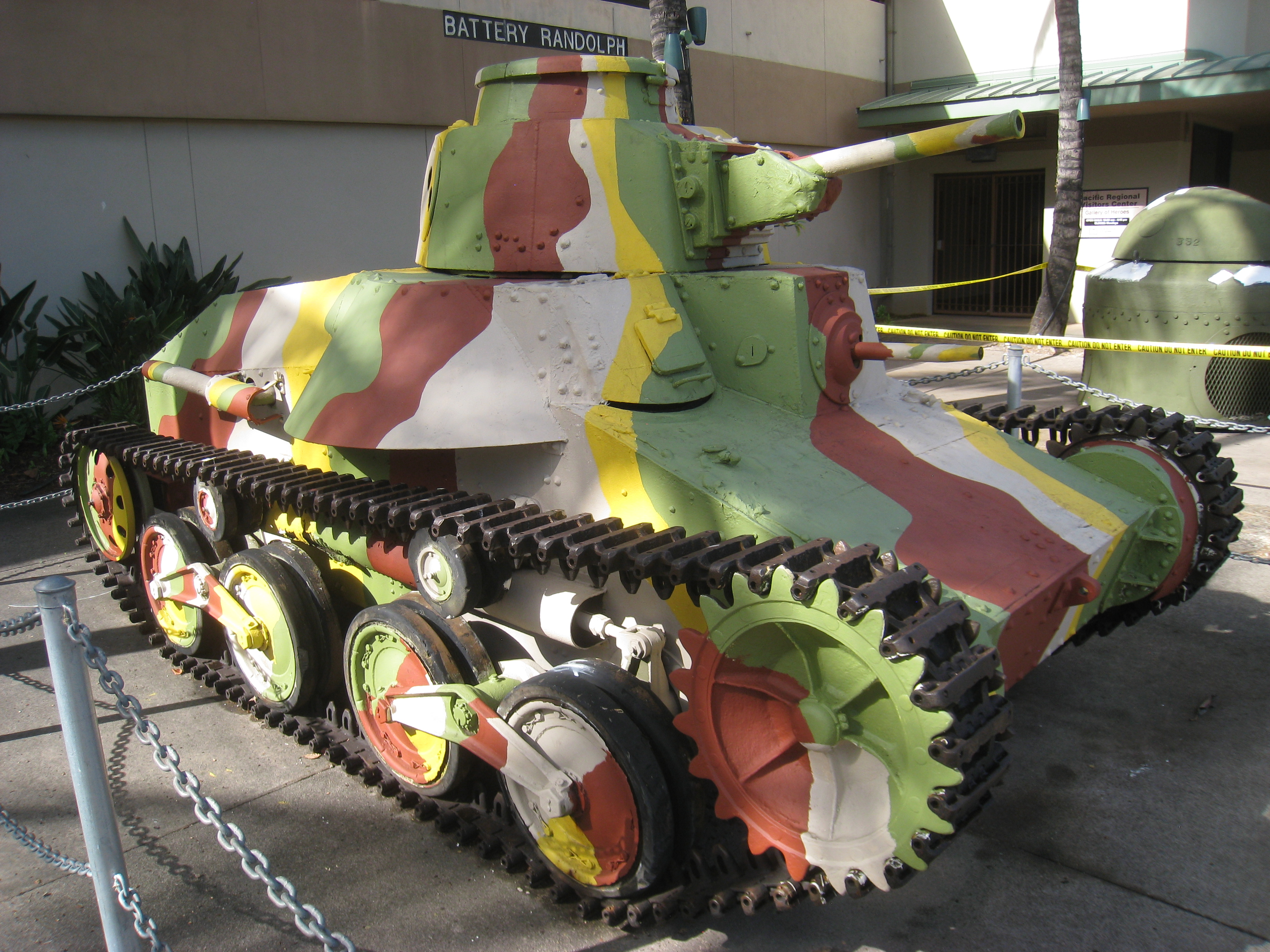
Type 95 on display at the Battery Randolf US Army Museum, Honolulu

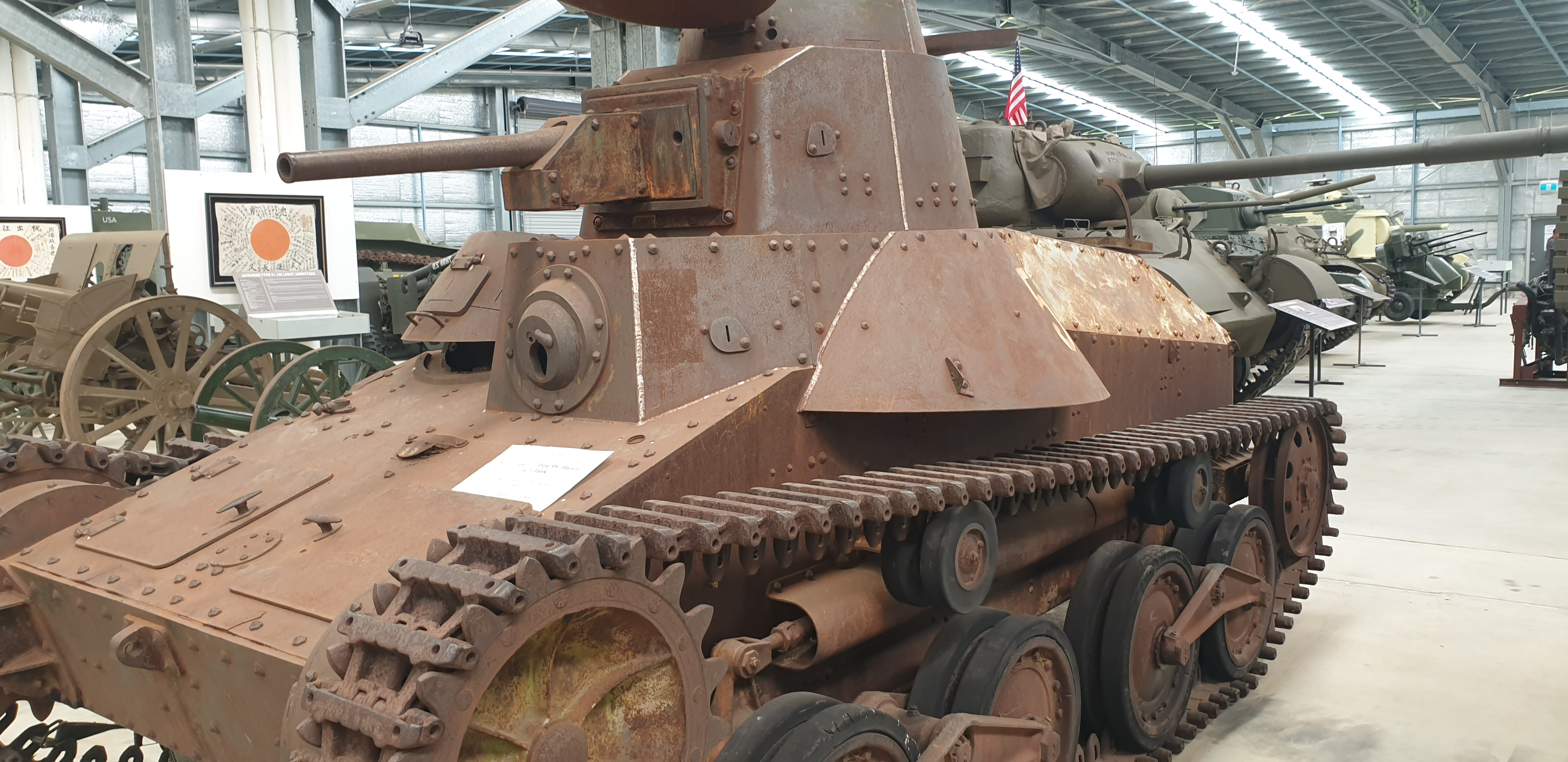
Type 95 on display at the Australian Armour and Artillery Museum

Type 95 on display at the Cavalry Tank Museum, Ahmednagar

A number of Type 95 Ha-Go tanks have been preserved at museums around the world. In 2007, the Oregon Military Museum sponsored the complete reconstruction of a Type 95 light tank. The tank is no longer operational, however, as the original engine encountered mechanical issues and lost oil pressure during a test drive. A second running Type-95 recovered from a Pacific island and restored largely in Poland is currently on loan to the Tank Museum at Bovington UK by its private owner. Following restoration and public debut at Bovington Tankfest 2019 this vehicle was sold to a Japanese buyer and the plan at that time was to return it to Japan for presentation and public display.

Video of the privately owned running Ha-Go

- Australian War Memorial, Australia
- Cavalry Tank Museum, Ahmednagar, Maharashtra, India
- Central Armed Forces Museum, Moscow, Russia
- Two at Patriot Park, Moscow, Russia
- Museum of the Great Patriotic War, Moscow, Russia
- Adisorn Cavalry Centre, Saraburi, Thailand
- The National Memorial, Bangkok, Thailand
- Reserve Affairs Center, Thailand
- Surasakmontree Army Camp, Lampang, Thailand
- Australian Armour and Artillery Museum, Australia
- The Tank Museum, Bovington, United Kingdom
- Indiana Military Museum, United States
- U.S. Army Armor and Cavalry Collection, Fort Benning, United States
- One intact vehicle and one wreck at the Oregon Military Museum, United States
- U.S. Army Museum of Hawaii, United States
- United States Army Ordnance Museum, United States
- Vadim Zadorozhny Museum of Technology, Moscow Oblast, Russia
- Sakhalin Regional Museum, Sakhalin Island, Russia
- Cavalry Tank Museum, Maharashtra, India
- National Defence Studies Institute, Bangkok, Thailand
- Reserves Training Center Territorial Defense Department, Bangkok, Thailand
- 4th Cavalry Regiment Phichai Dab Hak Camp, Uttaradit, Thailand
- Phitsanulok Airport, Phitsanulok, Thailand
- Weerathai Monument, Nakhon Si Thammarat, Thailand
- National Museum Of The Pacific War, Texas, United States
- Flying Heritage & Combat Armor Museum, Washington, United States
- Type 95 Ri-Ki at Kubinka Tank Museum, Russia
- Two hulls at Kokopo War Museum, Rabaul, Papua New Guinea

In addition to the examples detailed above, a replica of the Type 95 is exhibited at the National Museum of Singapore. The model was originally one of four models constructed for Tom Hanks and Steven Spielberg's 2010 mini-series, The Pacific.

== Operators ==
Empire of Japan

- The primary operator, with both the Imperial Japanese Army (IJA) and the Imperial Japanese Navy.

Kingdom of Thailand

- In 1940, the Royal Thai Army acquired approximately 50 Type 95s from Japan. A number of them spearheaded the Thai invasion of Burma's Shan states during the Second World War, at the time when Thailand was aligned with Japan. Following World War II, these tanks continued service with Thailand until they were decommissioned in 1952.

Manchukuo

- Some Type 95s were used for training from 1943 to 1945.

(Taiwan) Republic of China

- Captured from Japan and used by National Revolutionary Army (NRA) in the Chinese Civil War (from 1946 to 1949).

People's Republic of China

- The Chinese Communist troops (People's Liberation Army; PLA) captured examples from the Nationalist NRA (in turn captured from the Japanese) and received many others captured by the Soviet Union in their fighting against Japan. They were used in the Chinese Civil War, alongside Type 97 Chi-Ha and Type 97 ShinHōtō Chi-Ha tanks. The Chinese PLA armoured force of 349 tanks in 1949 consisted mainly of Japanese Type 95 Ha-Go and Type 97 tanks.

(France) French Fourth Republic

- Using leftover Japanese military equipment from the Japanese invasion of French Indochina, an ad-hoc unit of French and Japanese armour called the 'Commando Blindé du Cambodge' was created and this unit participated in the early stages of the First Indochina War.
