= Kalamkar =

Kalamkar may refer to:

- Kalamkar, a printed textile produced using the Kalamkari technique
- Abhishek Kalamkar, Mayor of Ahmednagar 2015–2016
