= Vardhman Sthanakvasi Jain Shravak Sangh =

Jain Religious Body

Vardhaman Sthanakvasi Jain Shravak Sangh - वर्धमान स्थानकवासी जैन श्रावक संघ is a Jain religious body founded in India in 1952.

Acharya Atmaramji was the first acharya of Shraman Sangh from 1952 to 1962.

Acharya Anand Rishiji Maharaj (1900–1992) was the second acharya of the Shraman Sangh from 1964 to 1992.

Acharya Shiv Muni ji Maharaj is the current acharya of the Shraman Sangh.
