= Avhane =

Village in Maharashtra

- village
- Location within Maharashtra Location within India
- Coordinates: 19.294881°N 75.142300°E
- Country: India
- State: Maharashtra
- District: Ahmednagar
- Taluka: Shevgaon

Avhane is a village of Shevgaon Taluka of Ahmednagar district in the state of Maharashtra, India. It is about 50 kilometres (31 mi) northeast of Ahmednagar and 50 kilometres (31 mi) from Aurangabad. This village is split in two parts as Avahne Budruk and Avhane Khurda. Avhane Budruk is famous for the temple of "Nidrista Ganapati", the Ganapati in the sleeping pose. There are only two Nidrista Ganapati: one in Chinchwad (Morya Gosavi), near Pune, and another one in the Avahne.
