= Anand Rishiji =

Indian Jain religious leader (1900–1992)

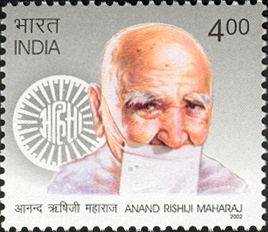

Personal life
- Born: Nemichand Gugaliya; 27 July 1900 Chichondi, Pathardi taluka, India
- Died: 28 March 1992 (aged 91) Ahmednagar, India
- Known for: Jain religious leader

Religious life
- Religion: Jainism
- Sect: Śvetāmbara

Anand Rishiji Maharaj (27 July 1900 – 28 March 1992) was a Jain religious leader. The Government of India issued a commemorative postage stamp in his honour on 9 August 2002. He was awarded with the honorary title of Rashtra Sant by Maharashtra's chief minister. He was the Second Aacharya of Vardhaman Sthanakvasi Shraman Sangha

== Early life ==
He was born in chichondi (Maharashtra) on 27 July 1900(shravan sukla 1 vikram sanvat 1957) and received initiation from the age of thirteen with Acharya Ratna Rishiji Maharaj, who died in Alipur, Maharashtra in 1927. He was pious from his childhood, and started taking religious lessons at an early age. From 1964 until his death in 1992, he was the second Acharya of Vardhman Sthanakvasi Jain Shravak Sangh, a Jain religious body.

== Spiritual life ==
At the age of 13, Nemichand decided to spend the rest of his life as a Jain sant. His diksha (consecration) took place on 7 December 1913 (Margashirsha Shukla Navami) at Miri in Ahmednagar district. He was then given the name Anand Rishi Ji Maharaj. He started learning Sanskrit and Prakrit Stotras under the guidance of Pandit Rajdhari Tripathi. He gave his first pravachan to the public in 1920 at Ahmednagar.

Together with Ratna Rishi Ji Maharaj, Anand Rishi Ji had started promoting Jainism. After mentor Ratna Rishi Ji Maharaj's santhara death in Alipur in 1927, Anand Rishi Ji was devastated. However, he never forgot his mentors words "Never be sad, and always work towards well-being of mankind". His first chaturmas without his mentor was in Hinganghat in 1927. In 1931, he used to have religious discussions with Jain dharma divakar Chuathmalji Maharaj, who realized Anand Rishi Ji's capability to become Acharya, and conveyed his wish it to his followers.

Anand Rishi Ji started many programs to benefit Shravaks. While in Ghodnadi for chaturmas, he decided to establish a religious center called Shri. Tilok Ratna Sthanakvasi Jain Dharmik Pariksha Board. It was established in Ahmednagar on 25 November 1936.

In 1952, at Sadri Sadhu Sammelan in Rajasthan, Anand Rishi Ji was declared as the Prime Minister of Jain Shraman Sangha. In 1953, many renowned Jain sadhus came together for a common chaturmas in Jodhpur, Rajasthan. On 13 May 1964 (Phalguna Shukla Ekadasi), Anand Rishi Ji became second Acharya of Shraman Sangha. The ceremony took place in Ajmer, Rajasthan.

After his chaturmas in 1974 in Mumbai, Anand Rishi Ji arrived in Pune. A huge welcome ceremony took place at Shaniwar Wada. On 13 February 1975 (Maagha shukla dvitiya), he was awarded the title Rashtra Sant by Maharashtra's chief minister Vasantrao Naik. This was also the year of his 75th birthday. The same year, Anand Foundation was established. 1987 was the diamond jubilee year of his consecration as a sadhu. It was celebrated with nine consecrations, and in the presence of Pujya Shankaracharya and Chief Minister Shankarrao Chavan.

One more divine thing about the revered Acharya is that he had a PADAM symbol in his foot middle. He would exhibit that only to those devotees who forbid one of his habit or vowed some PRAN for lifetime.

He was the founder of many educational institutes. The AnandDham, Anandrishiji Hospital, Anandrishiji Netralaya and Anandrishiji Blood Bank in Ahmednagar were built in his memory and are named after him.

== Death ==
He accepted santhara (preparation for death by fasting) before his death on 28 March 1992 in Ahmednagar, Maharashtra.
