= Cavalry Tank Museum, Ahmednagar =

Cavalry Tank Museum
- Established: February __, 1994
- Location: Ahilyanagar, Maharashtra, India
- Coordinates: 19.0718728°N 74.7492336°E
- Type: Tank Museum
- Key holdings: Vijayanta Tank, World War II Tanks, Indian Army Tanks.
- Collection size: 50

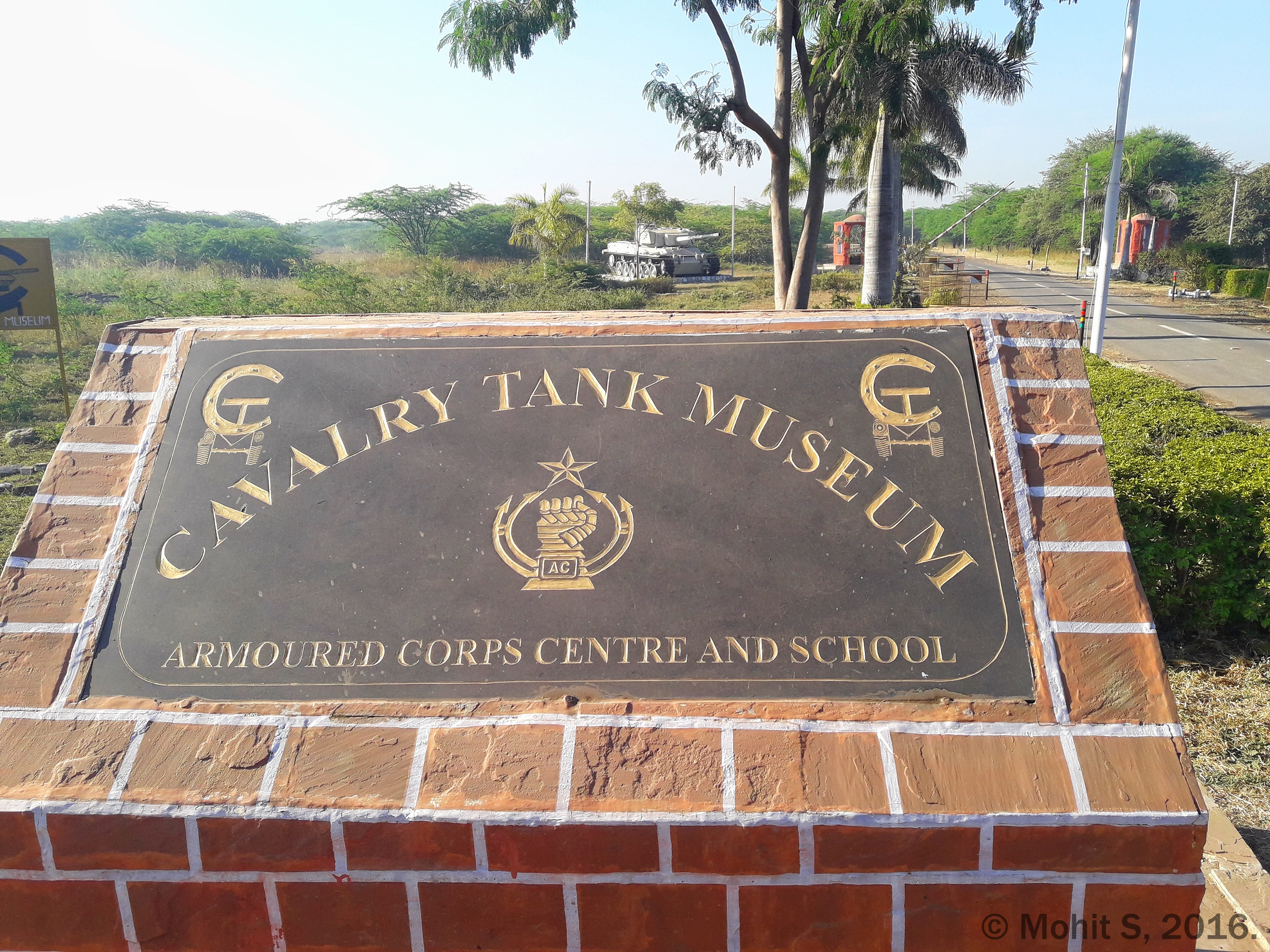
Cavalry Tank museum

Cavalry Tank Museum is a military museum in Ahmednagar in the state of Maharashtra, India. It was established by the Armored Corps Centre and School in February 1994. It is the only museum of its kind in Asia and houses about 50 exhibits of vintage armored fighting vehicles.

== Collection ==
The oldest exhibit is the silver Ghost Rolls-Royce Armoured Car (Indian Pattern). The older exhibits date to First World War vintage and served on the battlefields of Cambrai, the Somme, and Flanders. A large number of vehicles are from Second World War period.

Among the exhibits are a British Valentine and two Churchill Mk. VII infantry tanks, along with a Matilda II of similar type, an Imperial Japanese Type 95 Ha-Go light tank and a Type 97 Chi-Ha medium tank, a US Sherman Crab mine-flail tank, a British Centurion Mk. II main battle tank (MBT), a Nazi German Schwerer Panzerspähwagen heavy armoured car and Indian Vijayanta MBT.

Also on display is a British Archer tank destroyer (based on the Valentine tank), a Canadian Sexton self-propelled artillery tracked-vehicle, US M3 Stuart and M22 Locust light tanks, together with an American M3 Medium Tank and various armoured cars from different eras and periods of conflicts.

A Nazi German 88mm anti-aircraft/armour field-gun captured from German troops (possibly belonging to the 15th Panzer Division of the Afrika Korps, based on the divisional markings on the artillery-piece) is also on display at the museum.

There are some war-trophy tanks taken from the Pakistani military during both the Indo-Pakistani War of 1965 and the Indo-Pakistani War of 1971, such as the American-made M47 Patton medium tank, a WWII-era Chaffee and a Cold War-era M41 Walker Bulldog, both light tanks. On display is also an Indian AMX-13 light tank of French origin from the 1950s and a PT-76 amphibious/light tank from that same period.

On the museum's Memory Hill, it is where the housing of souvenirs of all regiments of the Indian Army's Armoured Corps are kept. The museum stays open on all days of the week (except Mondays) from 9:00am to 5:00pm. There is an entry fee of Rs. 50 (50 rupees) per person with additional fees included for photography and video-recording.

== Vehicles on display ==
- Vijayanta main battle tank
- Silver Ghost Rolls-Royce Armoured Car
- Valentine infantry tank
- Valentine bridge laying vehicle
- Churchill Mk VII infantry tank
- Cruiser Mk I tank
- Centurion main battle tank
- Matilda I infantry tank
- Type 95 Ha-Go light tank
- Sherman Crab Mine flail tank
- Sherman BARV Sea Lion
- Sexton self-propelled gun
- Centurion MK II main battle tank
- Schwerer Panzerspähwagen armoured car
- M3 Stuart light tank
- M22 Locust light tank
- M24 Chaffee light tank
- M41 Walker Bulldog light tank

== Gallery ==
Tanks at Cavalry Tank Museum

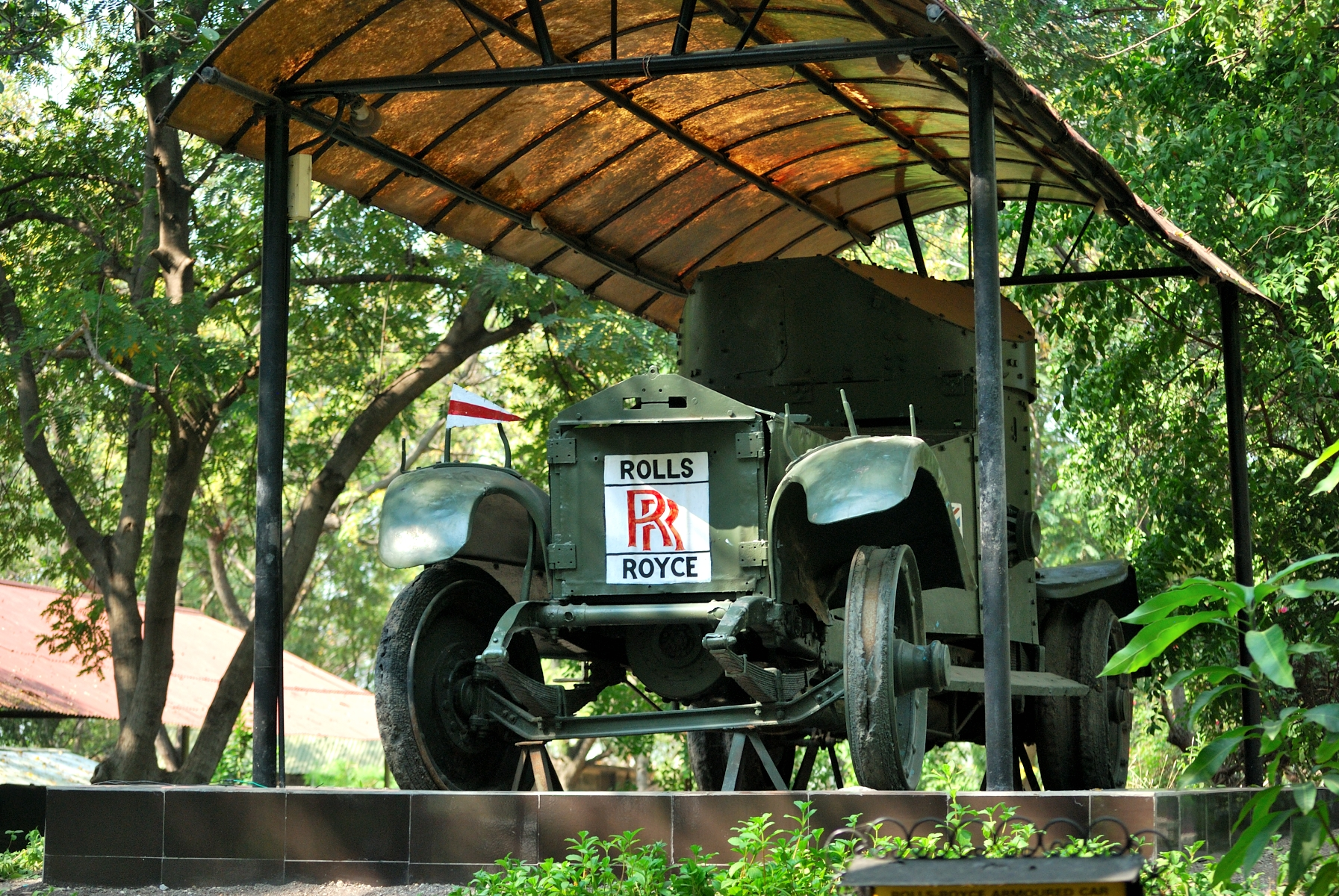
Rolls-Royce Armoured Car

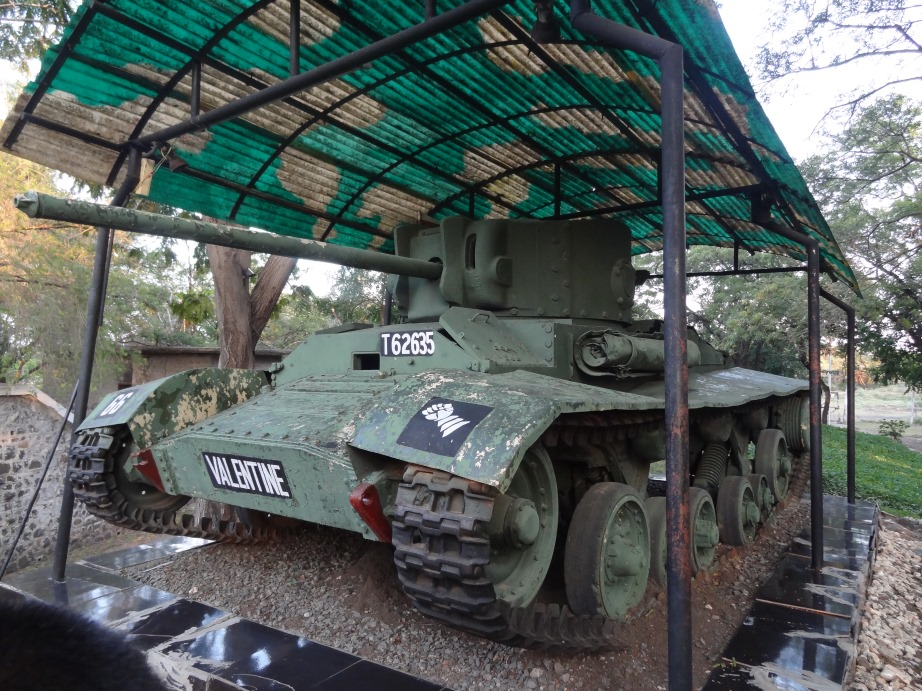
British Valentine Tank

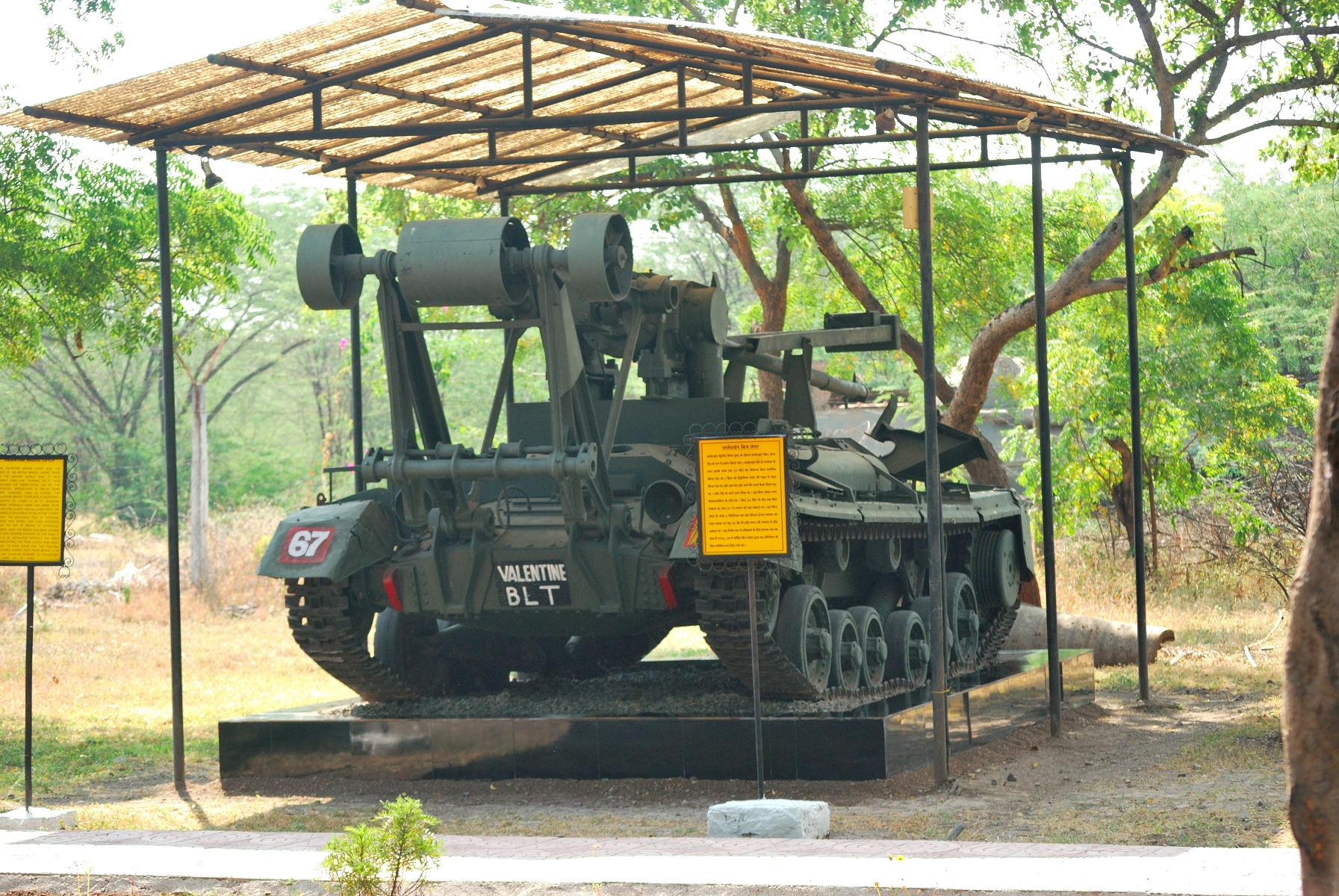
Bridge Layer Version of Valentine Tank

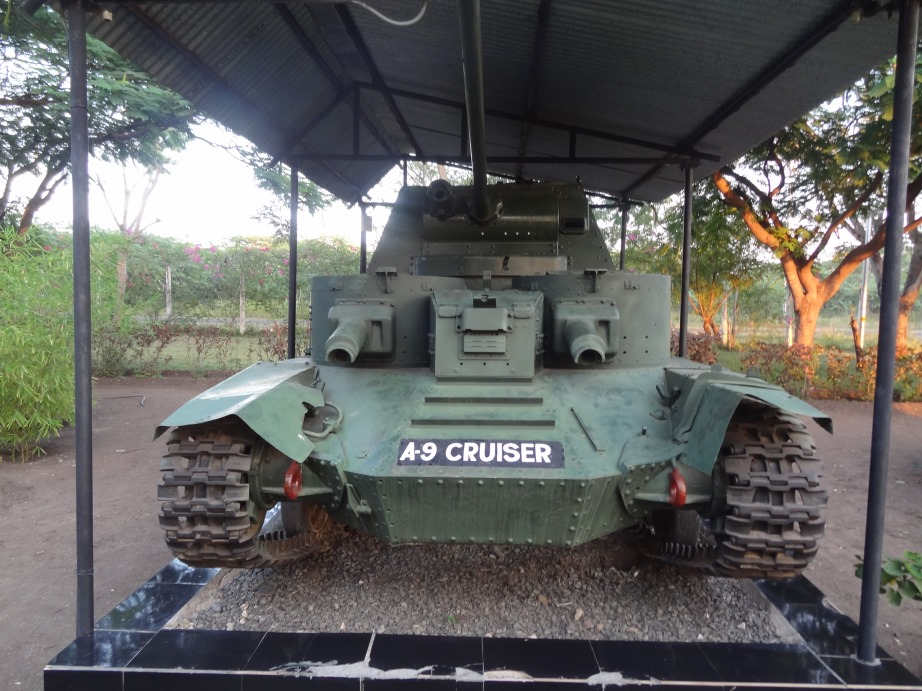
A9-Cruiser Mk I

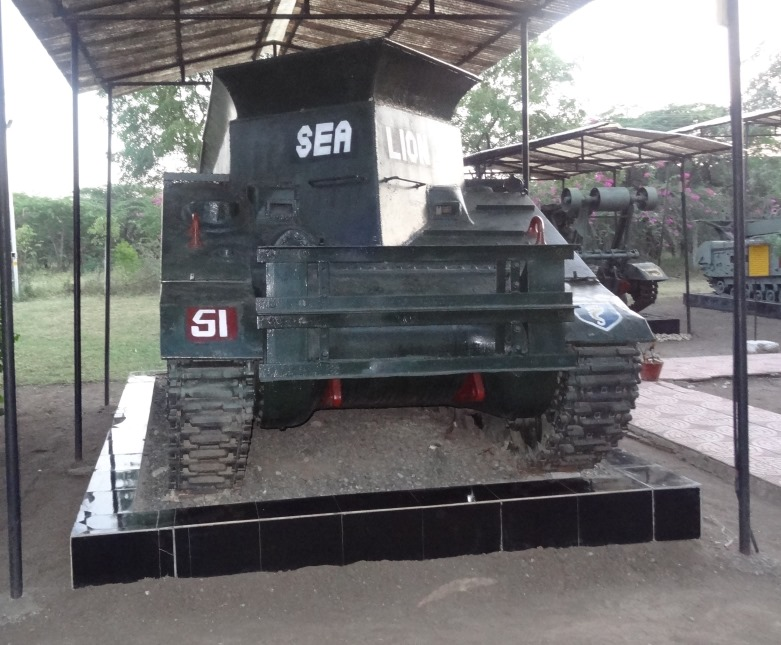
Sea Lion Sherman BARV

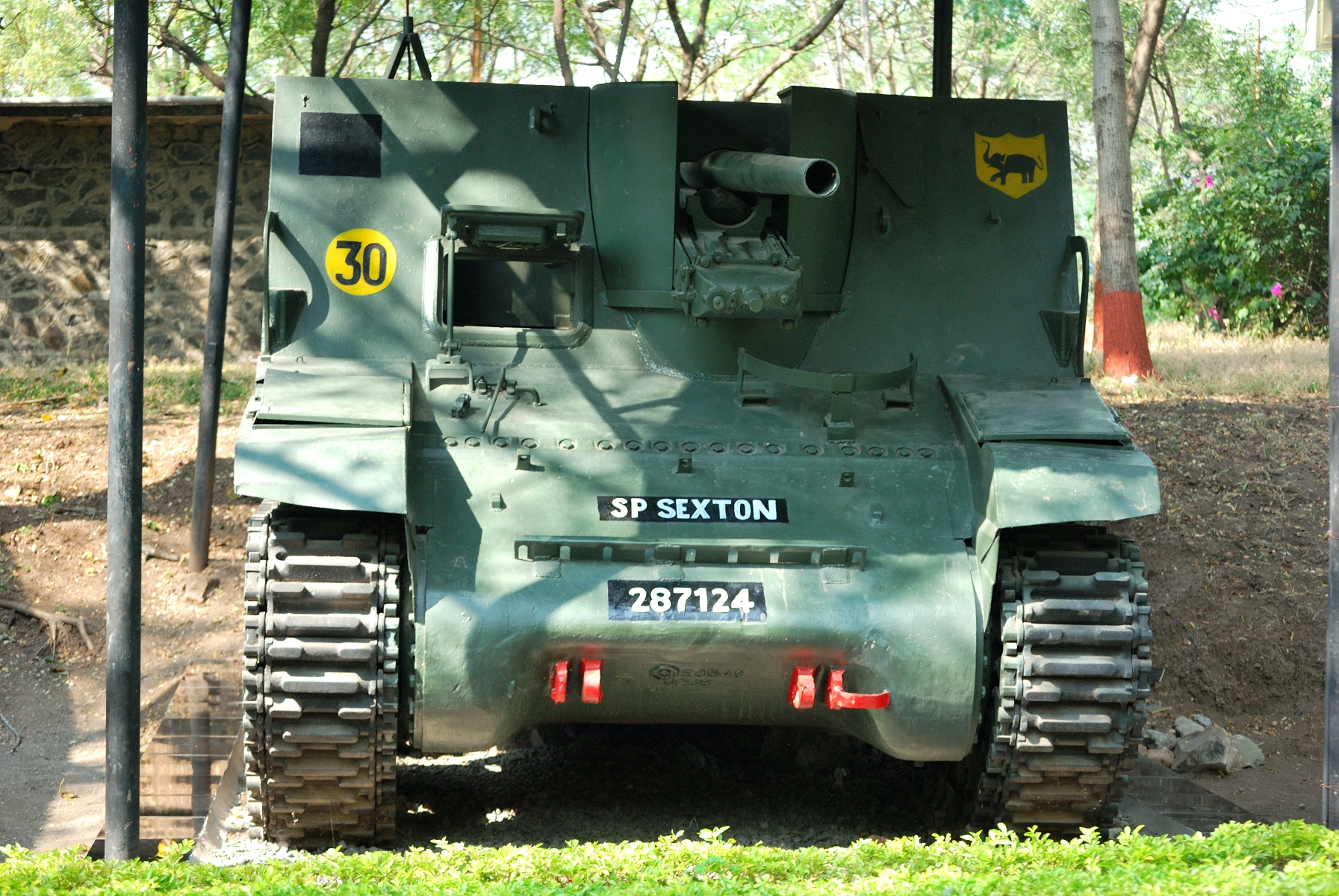
Sexton self-propelled gun

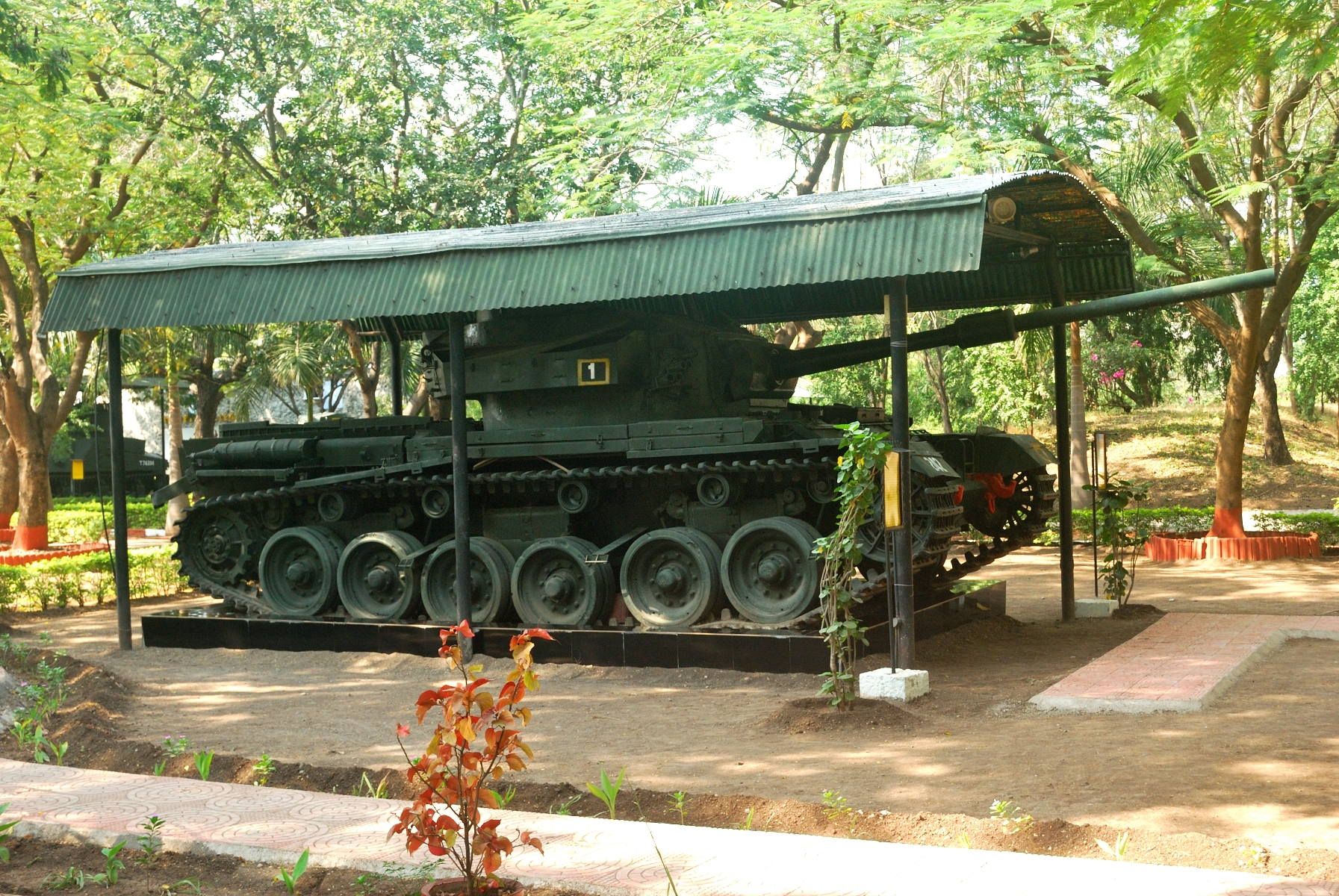
Indian Centurion tank
