= List of mayors of Ahmednagar =

Mayor of Ahmednagar
- Incumbent; JyotiGade since 6 February 2026
- Term length: 2.5
- Formation: 2003
- Website: Official website

The mayor of Ahmednagar is the first citizen of the Indian city of Ahmednagar. This person is the chief of the Ahmednagar Municipal Corporation, but his/her role is largely ceremonial as the real powers are vested in the Municipal Commissioner. The mayor also plays a functional role in deliberating over the discussions in the Corporation.

== Current mayor ==
The current mayor is Jyoti Gade.

== History of the Office ==
Ahmednagar Municipal Council was converted and elevated to Municipal Corporation in 2003. The office came into existence since then.

== Election of the mayor ==
The mayor is elected from within the ranks of the council in a quinquennial election. The elections are conducted in all 68 wards in the city to elect corporators. The party that wins the maximum number of seats holds an internal voting to decide the mayor.

The tenure of the mayor is two and a half years.

== Mayors of Ahmednagar ==
Mayor	Political Party
Mr. Bhagwan Fulsoundar (2003)	Shiv Sena
Mr. Sandip Kotkar (2006)	Indian National Congress
Mr. Sangram Jagtap (2008)	Nationalist Congress Party
Mrs. Sheela Shinde (2011)	Shiv Sena

#	Name	Tenure			Election	Party
	Sangram Jagtap	30 December 2013	21 June 2016	2 years, 174 days	2013	Nationalist Congress Party
	Surekha Kadam	21 June 2016	28 December 2018	2 years, 190 days	2013	Shiv Sena
	Babasaheb Wakale	28 December 2018	30 June 2021	2 years, 184 days	2018	Bharatiya Janata Party
	Rohini Shendage	30 June 2021	27 December 2023	2 years, 180 days	2018	Shiv Sena
	Jyoti Gade	6 February 2026	Incumbent	213 days	2026	Nationalist Congress Party
