= Surekha Kadam =

Indian politician

- सुरेखा कदम

Mayor of Ahmednagar Municipal Corporation
- In office June 2016 – 2018

Personal details
- Party: Shiv Sena

Surekha Kadam (Marathi: सुरेखा कदम) is Shiv Sena politician from Ahmednagar district. She is the former mayor of Ahmednagar.

== Positions held ==
- 2012: Elected as corporator in Ahmednagar Municipal Corporation
- 2016: Elected as Mayor of Ahmednagar Municipal Corporation in 2016
