= Mula Dam =

Mula Dam(Dnyaneshwar sagar)
- Location within Maharashtra
- Official name: Mula Dam
- Location: Rahuri
- Coordinates: 19.3293065°N 74.5295548°E
- Opening date: 1972
- Owners: Government of Maharashtra, India

Dam and spillways
- Type of dam: Earthfill; Gravity
- Impounds: Mula river
- Height: 48.17 m (158.0 ft)
- Length: 2,856 m (9,370 ft)
- Dam volume: 7,594 km^{3} (1,822 cu mi)

Reservoir
- Total capacity: 608,890 km^{3} (146,080 cu mi)
- Surface area: 53,600 km^{2} (20,700 sq mi)

Mula Dam is an earthfill and gravity dam on Mula river near Rahuri in Ahmednagar district of the state of Maharashtra in India.

== Specifications ==
The height of the dam above lowest foundation is 48.17 m (158.0 ft) while the length is 2,856 m (9,370 ft). The volume content is 7,594 km^{3} (1,822 cu mi) and gross storage capacity is 736,320.00 km^{3} (176,652.56 cu mi). Water capacity is 26 TMC.

== Purpose ==
- Irrigation: Has canals on either bank flowing downstream through the Ahmednagar district towards Aurangabad district irrigating the water deficient central eastern region of the Ahmednagar district. It is also the principal source of water for the Mahatma Phule Krishi Vidyapeeth.
- Drinking Water: It also provides drinking water supply to perennially water deficient Ahmednagar city. The water is transported via pipeline from the dam to the Ahmednagar city.

== See also ==
- Dams in Maharashtra
- List of reservoirs and dams in India
