= Oregon Military Museum =

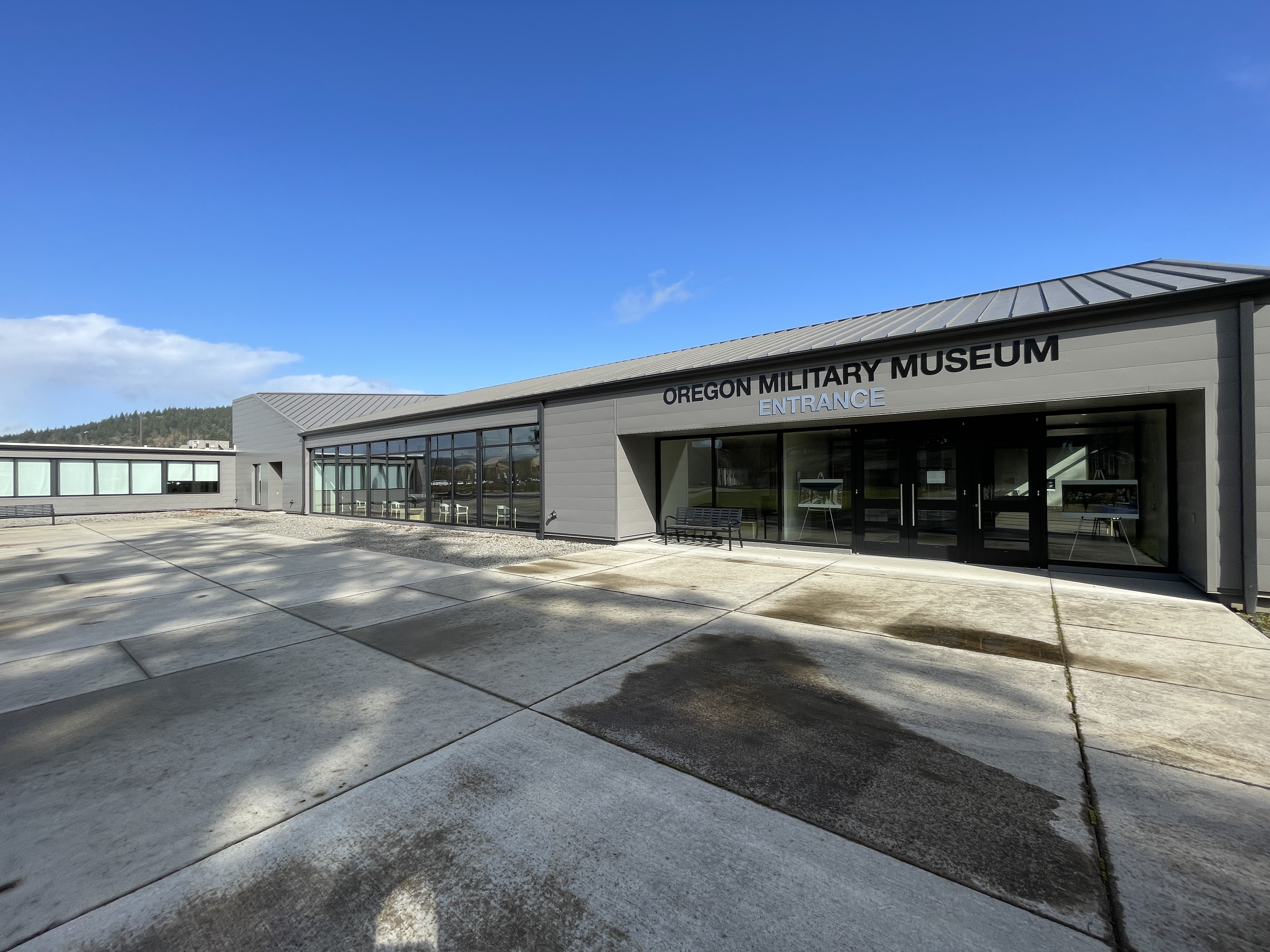
- Main building

- Location in Oregon
- Established: 1975
- Location: Camp Withycombe, Oregon
- Coordinates: 45.4112°N 122.5590°W
- Type: Military museum
- Director: Kathleen Sligar
- Architect: Don Stastny
- Website: oregonmilitarymuseum.org

The Oregon Military Museum (OMM) at Camp Withycombe in Clackamas County, Oregon, is a museum of Oregon's military heritage including the Oregon National Guard, the state's early militias, and all branches of the US Armed Forces. The museum's main building includes the drill floor, weapons, and temporary galleries for permanent and rotating exhibits, as well as the Conference Classroom, Museum Store, Hall of Valor, and the Thomas E. Withycombe Library. Surrounding the main building, the Historic Park, open seasonally, includes two historic buildings, the Quartermaster Storehouse and the Battery A Field Artillery Horse Barn, as well as an outdoor tracked vehicle display.
