= Ahmednagar Municipal Corporation =

Local civic body in Ahmednagar, Maharashtra, India

Ahilyanagar Municipal Corporation

Type
- Type: Municipal Corporation of the Ahmednagar

Leadership
- Mayor: Jyoti Amol Gade, NCP
- Municipal Commissioner: Pankaj Ashiya, (IAS)
- Deputy Mayor: Dhananjay Jadhav, BJP

Structure
- Seats: 68
- Political groups: Government (52): NCP (27); BJP (25); Opposition (16): SHS (10); INC (2); AIMIM (2); SS(UBT) (1); BSP (1)

Elections
- Last election: 2026

Website
- http://amc.gov.in

The Ahilyanagar Municipal Corporation (AMC) is the governing body of the city of Ahmednagar in the Indian state of Maharashtra. The municipal corporation consists of democratically elected members, is headed by a mayor and administers the city's infrastructure, public services and police. Members from the state's various leading political parties hold elected offices in the corporation. Ahmednagar Municipal Corporation is located in Ahmednagar and was formed in the year 2003. The current Mayor of Ahmednagar is Jyoti Gade. She is a member of the Nationalist Congress Party political party.

== Revenue sources ==
The following are the income sources for the corporation from the Central and State Government.

=== Revenue from taxes ===
These are the tax related revenue sources for the corporation:

- Property tax
- Profession tax
- Entertainment tax
- Grants from central and state government like goods and services tax
- Advertisement tax

=== Revenue from non-tax sources ===
These are the of non-tax related revenue sources for the corporation:

- Water usage charges
- Fees from documentation services
- Rent received from municipal property
- Funds from municipal bonds

== Area of jurisdiction ==
The Ahmednagar Municipal Corporation comes under B-Class Municipal Corporation as Maharashtra State Rule. A.M.C consistently governs old city i.e. main city along with newly developed suburban area. The parts of the city are:

1. AhmedNagar (head city)
2. Savedi (suburban)
3. Kedgaon (suburban)
4. Kotla
5. Nagapur (excluding M.I.D.C.)
6. Bolhegaon
7. Shivajinagar
8. Govindpura
9. Mukundnagar
10. Tarakpur
11. Bhutkarvadi
12. Nalegaon
13. Sarasnagar
14. Burudgaon

== Tasks ==
As per the CNC Act, 1948, the key responsibility for providing Ahmednagar's citizens basic urban services lies with the Ahmednagar Municipal Corporation. NMC is responsible for administering and providing basic infrastructure to the city.

1. Intra-city transport service.
2. Building and Maintenance of roads, streets and flyovers.
3. Public Municipal schools
4. Water purification and supply
5. Hospitals
6. Street lighting
7. Maintenance of parks and open spaces
8. Sewage treatment and disposal
9. Garbage disposal and street cleanliness
10. Urban development and city planning of new areas.
11. Registering of births and deaths.

== Administration ==
The corporation is headed by a Municipal commissioner, an IAS officer. He wields the executive power of the house. A quinquennial election is held to elect corporators to power. They are responsible for overseeing that their constituencies have the basic civic infrastructure in place, and that there is no lacuna on the part of the authorities. The mayor heads the party with the largest vote. A largely ceremonial post, he has limited duties.

Various departments such as public relations, library, health, finance, buildings, slums, roads, street lighting, traffic, establishment, gardens, public works, local audit, legal services, water works, education, octroi and fire services manage their specific activities. The activities of NMC are administered by its zonal offices.

- Street lighting
- Maintenance of parks and open spaces
- Sewage treatment and disposal
- Garbage disposal and street cleanliness
- Urban development and city planning of new areas
- Registering of births and deaths

== Election result ==
=== 2026 ===
| Party | Seats | +/- |
|---|---|---|
| Nationalist Congress Party | 27 | ▲9 |
| Bharatiya Janata Party | 25 | ▲11 |
| Shiv Sena | 10 | ▼14 |
| Indian National Congress | 2 | ▼3 |
| All India Majlis-e-Ittehadul Muslimeen | 2 | New entry |
| Shiv Sena (UBT) | 1 | New entry |
| Bahujan Samaj Party | 1 | ▼3 |
| Total | 68 | |

=== 2018 ===
| Party | Seats | +/- |
|---|---|---|
| Shiv Sena | 24 | |
| Nationalist Congress Party | 18 | |
| Bharatiya Janata Party | 14 | |
| Indian National Congress | 5 | |
| Bahujan Samaj Party | 4 | |
| Samajwadi Party | 1 | |
| Independent | 2 | |
| Total | 68 | |
