= Ahmednagar =

City in North Maharashtra, India

- City
- Ahilyanagar
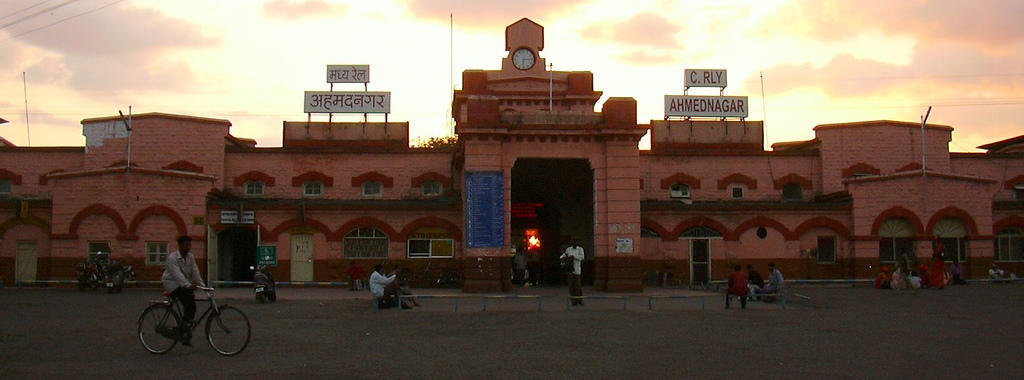
- Ahmednagar railway station
- Interactive map of Ahmednagar
- Coordinates: 19.08°N 74.73°E
- Country: India
- State: Maharashtra
- District: Ahmednagar
- Founded: 1490
- Founder: Ahmad Nizam Shah I
- Named for: Ahmad Nizam Shah I (formerly); Ahilyadevi Holkar (present)

Government
  - Type: Mayor–Council
  - Body: Ahmednagar Municipal Corporation
  - Mayor: Jyoti Amol Gade

Area
  - Total: 39.30 km^{2} (15.17 sq mi)
- Elevation: 649 m (2,129 ft)

Population (2011)
  - Total: 350,905
  - Rank: 124th
  - Density: 8,929/km^{2} (23,130/sq mi)
- Demonym: AhilyaNagari / Ahilyanagarkar / Ahmednagarkar / Ahmednagari /Nagarkar (Marathi)
- Time zone: UTC+5:30 (IST)
- PIN: 414001, 414003
- Telephone code: 0241
- Vehicle registration: MH-16, MH-17
- Official language: Marathi
- Website: ahmednagar.gov.in

Ahmednagar, officially Ahilyanagar, is a city in, and the headquarters of the Ahmednagar district, Maharashtra, India. Ahmednagar has several dozen buildings and sites from the Nizam Shahi period. Ahmednagar Fort, once considered almost impregnable, was used by the British to detain Jawaharlal Nehru (the first prime minister of India) and other Indian Nationalists before Indian independence. A few rooms there have been converted to a museum. During his confinement by the British at Ahmednagar Fort in 1944, Nehru wrote the book The Discovery of India. Ahmednagar is home to the Indian Armoured Corps Centre & School (ACC&S), the Mechanised Infantry Regimental Centre (MIRC), the Vehicle Research and Development Establishment (VRDE) and the Controllerate of Quality Assurance Vehicles (CQAV). Training and recruitment for the Indian Army Armoured Corps takes place at the ACC&S.

Ahmednagar is a relatively small town and shows less development than the nearby western Maharashtra cities of Mumbai and Pune. Ahmednagar is home to 19 sugar factories and is also the birthplace of the cooperative movement. Due to scarce rainfall, the city often suffers from drought. Marathi is the primary language for daily-life communication. The city administration has recently published a plan of developing the city by year 2031.

== Etymology ==
Ahmednagar took its name from Ahmad Nizam Shah I, who founded the town in 1494 on the site of a battlefield where he won a battle against superior Bahamani forces. It was close to the site of the village of Bhingar. With the breakup of the Bahmani Sultanate, Ahmad established a new sultanate in Ahmednagar, also known as Nizam Shahi dynasty.

== History ==
The town Ahmednagar was founded in 1494 by Ahmad Nizam Shah I on the site of a more ancient city, Bhingar. With the breakup of the Bahmani Sultanate, Ahmad established a new sultanate in Ahmednagar, also known as Nizam Shahi dynasty. The establishment of the city is described in major contemporary historical works. One account, from Sayyid ‘Ali b. ‘Aziz Allah Tabataba’i's Burhān-i ma’āsir, notes the planned nature of the construction:

An auspicious day was selected, and the surveyors, architects and builders obeyed the king’s commands, and laid out and began to build the city in with its palaces, houses, squares and shops, and laid around it fair gardens.

Another chronicler, Muhammad Qasim Hindushah Astarabadi, known as Firishta, discusses the founding in his Tārīkh-i Firishta. His work suggests the design, particularly the inclusion of gardens with palaces and pavilions both inside and outside the city walls, followed the conventions of a post-Timurid city. Firishta describes:

“In 900, he laid the foundation of a city in the vicinity of the Sina river, to which he gave the name of Ahmadnagar. So great exertions were made in erecting buildings by the king and his dependents, that in the short space of two years the new city rivalled Baghdad and Cairo in splendour.”

It was one of the Deccan sultanates, which lasted until its conquest by Mughal emperor Shah Jahan in 1636. Aurangzeb, the last Mughal emperor, who spent the latter years of his reign, 1681–1707, in the Deccan, died in Ahmednagar and is buried at Khuldabad, near Aurangabad in 1707, with a small monument marking the site.

In 1759, the Peshwa of the Marathas obtained possession of the place from Nizam of Hyderabad and in 1795 it was ceded by the Peshwa to the Maratha chief Daulat Rao Sindhia. In 1803 Ahmednagar was besieged by a British force under Richard Wellesley and captured. It was afterward restored to the Marathas but again came into the possession of the British in 1817, according to the terms of the Treaty of Poona, and was known as Ahmednuggur.

In 19th century American Christian missionaries opened first modern schools in this town. According to a report there were four girls' school running under the superintendence of Cynthia Farrar around the 1850s. Mahatma Jyotirao Phule visited them and got inspired to open school for girls in Poona. Later, he enrolled his wife Savitribai Phule in Farrar's school in a teacher's training program. Farrar was from America and spent his entire life in Ahmednagar running her schools, these girls' schools were one of the first such kind in the country.

During the First World War, Ahmednagar was the site of a camp for Prisoners of War, mainly for German and Austrian civilian internees and the captured crews of German ships, but also some Turkish soldiers captured in Mesopotamia.

On 31 May 2023, Eknath Shinde (the chief minister of Maharashtra) announced that Ahmednagar would be renamed "Ahilya Nagar", in honour of Ahilyabai Holkar who was Rani of Indore, within the Maratha Confederacy in the late 18th-century. Deputy chief minister Devendra Fadnavis spoke at the same meeting, referring to Shinde's government as "pro-Hindutva", and asked Shinde to rename the district "Ahilyanagar"; Shinde replied: "The state government has accepted your demand to rename Ahmednagar as Ahilyadevi Holkar Nagar". The BJP demanded that Ahmednagar be renamed. Rais Shaikh (group leader of the Samajwadi Party in the Maharashtra Legislative Assembly) said that "The Maha Yuti government is implementing the 'Yogi pattern' of creating an illusion of development by changing the names of cities without doing anything for development" and accused the government of "distorting history". On 13 March 2024, the Maharashtra state cabinet announced that they had approved the renaming of Ahmednagar at the same time as they announced the renaming of seven railway stations in Mumbai. On 4 October 2024, the Maharashtra state government notified the state revenue and forest department of the change of name, who published this in the gazette on 8 October 2024.

== Military base ==
Ahmednagar is home to:

- Indian Armored Corps Centre & School (ACC&S)
- Mechanized Infantry Regimental Centre (MIRC)
- Vehicle Research and Development Establishment (VRDE)
- Controllerate of Quality Assurance Vehicles (CQAV)

Training and recruitment for the Indian Army Armored Corps take place at the ACC&S. Formerly, the city was the Indian base of the British Army's Royal Tank Corps/Indian Armored Corps, amongst other units. The town houses the second-largest display of military tanks in the world and the largest in Asia.

== Geography ==
=== Climate ===
Situated in the rain shadow region of the Western Ghats, Ahmednagar has a hot semi-arid climate (Köppen BSh). The climate is hot throughout the year and sweltering during the pre-monsoon months from March to mid-June, whilst monsoon rainfall averages less than a third of that received in Mumbai and about a tenth what is received in Mahabaleshwar on the crest of the mountains.

Climate data for Ahmednagar (1991–2020, extremes 1901–2012)
| Month | Jan | Feb | Mar | Apr | May | Jun | Jul | Aug | Sep | Oct | Nov | Dec | Year |
|---|---|---|---|---|---|---|---|---|---|---|---|---|---|
| Record high °C (°F) | 36.1 (97.0) | 38.9 (102.0) | 43.2 (109.8) | 43.5 (110.3) | 44.0 (111.2) | 43.3 (109.9) | 37.7 (99.9) | 39.5 (103.1) | 38.2 (100.8) | 39.7 (103.5) | 35.6 (96.1) | 35.6 (96.1) | 44.0 (111.2) |
| Mean daily maximum °C (°F) | 30.5 (86.9) | 32.7 (90.9) | 36.4 (97.5) | 38.8 (101.8) | 38.7 (101.7) | 33.3 (91.9) | 29.6 (85.3) | 29.2 (84.6) | 29.8 (85.6) | 32.1 (89.8) | 31.1 (88.0) | 30.7 (87.3) | 32.8 (91.0) |
| Mean daily minimum °C (°F) | 11.1 (52.0) | 12.9 (55.2) | 16.4 (61.5) | 20.5 (68.9) | 22.4 (72.3) | 22.5 (72.5) | 21.6 (70.9) | 20.7 (69.3) | 20.6 (69.1) | 18.5 (65.3) | 15.1 (59.2) | 11.0 (51.8) | 17.9 (64.2) |
| Record low °C (°F) | 1.8 (35.2) | 2.8 (37.0) | 7.5 (45.5) | 9.5 (49.1) | 15.2 (59.4) | 17.0 (62.6) | 16.5 (61.7) | 12.2 (54.0) | 10.7 (51.3) | 10.6 (51.1) | 5.6 (42.1) | 3.3 (37.9) | 1.8 (35.2) |
| Average rainfall mm (inches) | 0.3 (0.01) | 0.6 (0.02) | 1.6 (0.06) | 4.8 (0.19) | 19.3 (0.76) | 135.7 (5.34) | 93.5 (3.68) | 116.5 (4.59) | 153.5 (6.04) | 65.5 (2.58) | 14.2 (0.56) | 2.6 (0.10) | 608.1 (23.94) |
| Average rainy days | 0.0 | 0.1 | 0.4 | 0.6 | 1.1 | 6.7 | 6.1 | 5.5 | 7.7 | 3.5 | 0.7 | 0.1 | 32.5 |
| Average relative humidity (%) (at 17:30 IST) | 36 | 30 | 25 | 24 | 28 | 56 | 67 | 69 | 68 | 58 | 51 | 44 | 46 |
Source: India Meteorological Department

== Demographics ==
Religions in Ahmednagar city (2011)
| Religion | Percent |
| Hinduism | 75.69% |
| Islam | 15.64% |
| Jainism | 4.35% |
| Christianity | 2.57% |
| Buddhism | 0.85% |
| Other or not stated | 0.90% |

As of 2011 Indian census, Ahmednagar had a population of 350,859. Ahmednagar has a sex ratio of 961 females per 1000 males and an average literacy rate of 84%, higher than the national urban average of 79.9%. 10% of the population is under 6 years of age.

Languages of Ahmednagar city (2011)
1. Marathi (68.0%)
2. Hindi (9.43%)
3. Urdu (8.59%)
4. Telugu (4.86%)
5. Marwari (4.31%)
6. Sindhi (1.35%)
7. Gujarati (0.95%)
8. Others (2.50%)

At the time of the 2011 Census of India, 68.01% of the population spoke Marathi, 9.43% Hindi, 8.59% Urdu, 4.86% Telugu, 4.31% Marwari, 1.35% Sindhi and 0.95% Gujarati as their first language.

== Pilgrimage and tourism ==
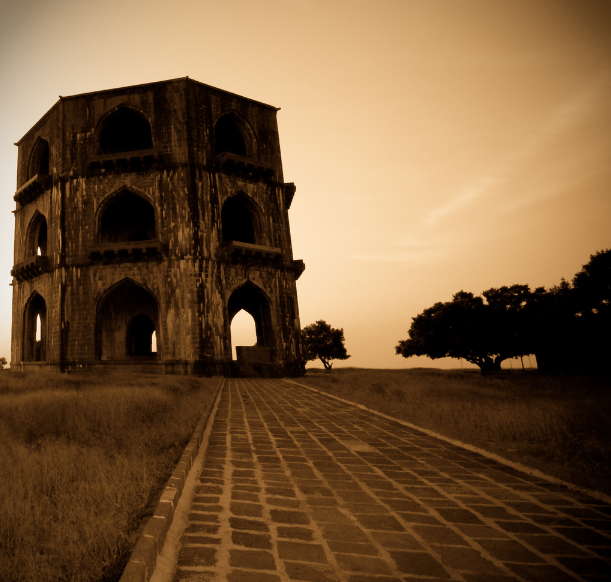
Salabat Khan's tomb

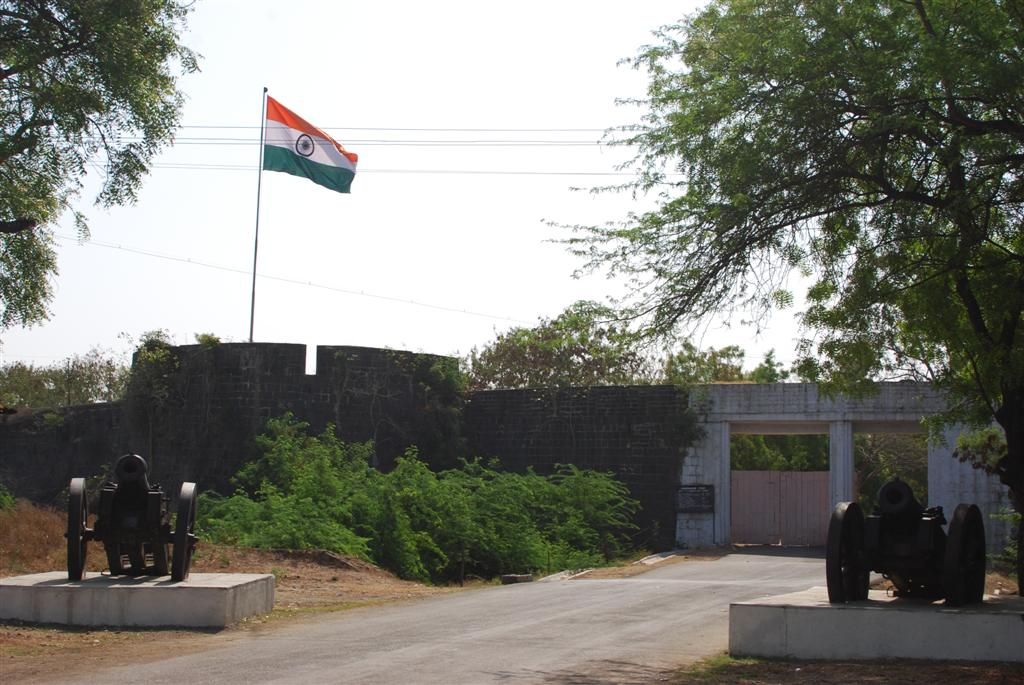
Ahmednagar fort entrance

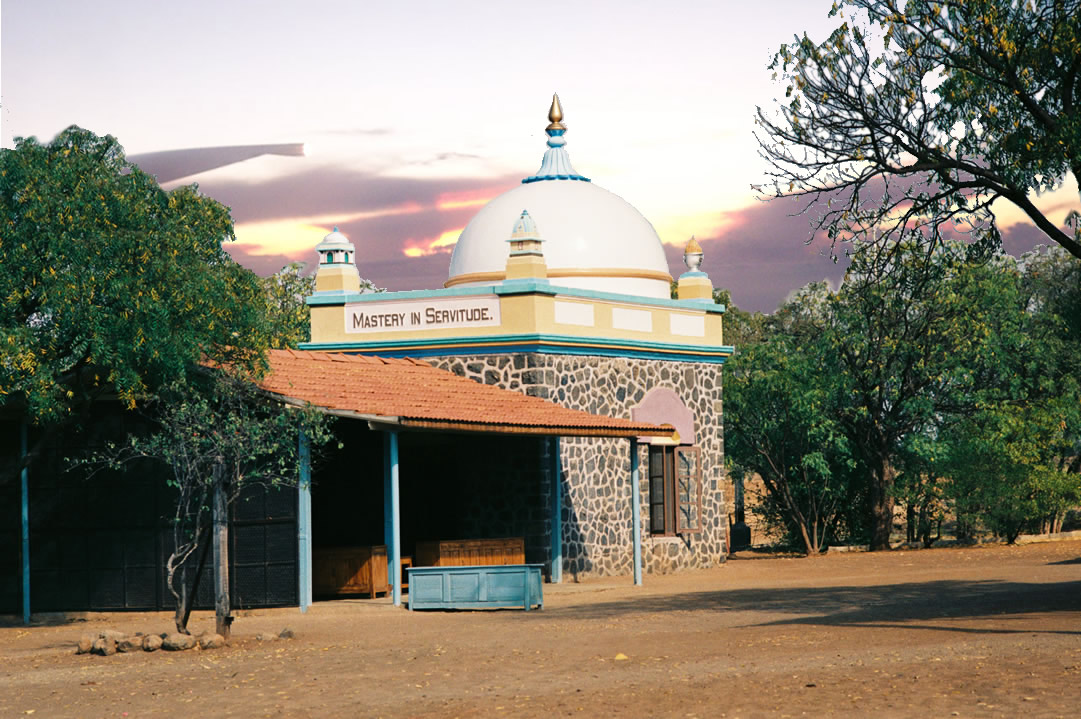
Samadhi of Meher Baba

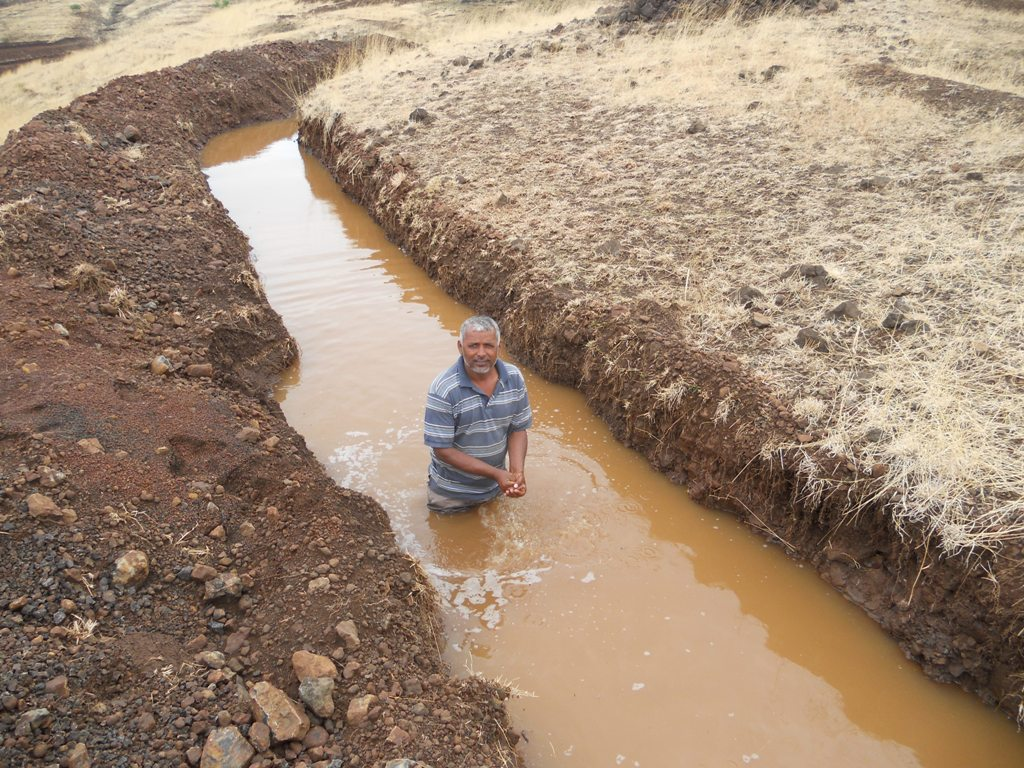
Deep continuous contour trenches (CCT)

- Meherabad, the Samadhi of Shri Avatar Meher Baba, is a place of pilgrimage, particularly on the anniversary of his death, Amartithi. His later residence was at Meherazad (near Pimpalgaon village), approximately nine miles north of Ahmednagar.
- Shani Shingnapur - Temple of Lord Shani
- Shri Munjaba Tample, Ukkadgaon – In Shrigonda Taluka about 60 km from Ahmednagar main city. It has four big statue of Ganapati, Mahadev (Shankar), Vishnu and Hanuman. Thousands of devotees visit this place.
- Ahmednagar Fort (Bhuekot Killa) – Built by Ahmed Nizam Shah in 1490, this is one of the best-designed and most impregnable forts in India. As of 2013, it is under the control of the military command of India.
- Tomb of Salabat Khan II – also called the Chand Bibi Palace, this is a solid three-storey stone structure situated on the crest of a hill 13 km from Ahmednagar city.
- Cavalry Tank Museum – The Armoured Corps Centre and School has created a museum with an extensive collection of 20th-century armoured fighting vehicles.
- Ralegan Siddhi – a village which is a model for environmental conservation. Social activist Anna Hazare is from Ralegan Siddhi.
- Pimpri Gawali – a village in Parner taluka, about 25 km away from Ahmednagar and known for the watershed development and agribusiness activities.
- Avhane, Shevgaon – Temple of Ganesh (Nidrista/Sleeping)
- Jamgaon – Place in Parner taluka with a historic 18th-century palace built by Mahadaji Shinde
- Mahatma Phule Krishi Vidyapeeth, Rahuri Mahatma Phule Krishi Vidyapeeth is an agricultural university at Rahuri, named after an activist and social reformer of 19th century. It is one of four agricultural universities in the state.
- Mula Dam: It is 52 km from the Ahilyanagar City

== Economy ==
Ahmednagar's economy is as diverse as its heritage, contributing approximately 3.5% to Maharashtra's GDP. Agriculture remains the backbone of the economy, with the district renowned for sugarcane, pomegranate, and onion production, earning it recognition as a hub for horticultural excellence. The industrial sector is growing steadily, supported by several MIDC zones that foster manufacturing and processing industries, with key industries including sugar processing, dairy, and agro-based enterprises, while emerging sectors like automotive components, pharmaceuticals, and renewable energy are gaining ground due to favorable policies and investor confidence, and startups and MSMEs are finding a supportive ecosystem in the district. The service sector, encompassing education, healthcare, and tourism, is actually the district's largest contributor to GDP, driven significantly by Shirdi's spiritual tourism along with eco-tourism destinations like Ratanwadi and Harishchandragad.

Some of the firms in Ahmednagar are Terasoft Technologies, Swami Software Solution, Bajaj Finserv Lending, Manappuram Finance Ltd, Shreeram Transport Finance Company, L & T Finance Ltd, Shriram Chits Maharashtra Ltd, Au Financiers(India) Pvt Ltd, Fullerton India, GE Money Financial Services Ltd, Muthoot Finance Ltd, Madhuson Finance Pvt Ltd, Shriram Insight Share Brokers Ltd, Karjatwala Engineer PVT. LTD, Nitin Agro Engineering Works, Ajinkya Engg Works, Spark Hydro Pneumatics Pvt Ltd, Laxmi Engineering Works, Nexcess Multi Service Corporation, C Shakti Engineering Works.

Ahmednagar's traditional crafts center on terracotta modeling, an ancient art dating to the Indus Valley Civilization, refined locally into mythology-themed figures depicting the Ramayana, Mahabharata, and Buddha's life, alongside utility items and decorative pieces. Artisan Anil Denghe, trained under Arjun Shekatkar, is a celebrated figure, government-recognized for his work. The process involves kneading clay, shaping by hand, detailing with simple tools, and firing at ~1000°C. Separately, Shivaji Nagar in Ahmednagar is known for wooden handicraft furniture — devghars (home shrines), stools, chairs, and benches — produced at a local wooden furniture factory, representing another distinct traditional craft of the district.

== Transport ==
=== Air ===
Ahmednagar has 1 airport, the nearest domestic airport at Shirdi at 90 km. While the nearest International Airport is at Pune.

Ahmednagar city has air connectivity by seaplane service. The seaplane port is located at the Mula Dam water reservoir, 30 minutes away from Ahmednagar City. The service has been offered by Maritime Energy Heli Air Services Pvt. Ltd. (MEHAIR) from 22 September 2014. Ongoing flights are available from Juhu, Mumbai to Mula Dam.

=== Rail ===
Ahmednagar railway station (station code: ANG) belongs to Solapur Division of Central Railway zone of the Indian Railways. Ahmednagar has rail connectivity with Pune, Manmad, Kopargaon, Shirdi, Daund, Goa, Nasik and other metro-cities like New Delhi, Mumbai, Chennai, Kolkata, Bangalore, Ahmedabad. 41 express trains stop at this station. There is still a demand for direct rail connectivity to other major cities of India. Ahmednagar station will now be a part of the Pune railway division. 24 stations of the Daund-Ankai section will be merged with Pune railway division. The Daund-Ankai section is currently under the management of the Solapur railway division. The change to the Pune division will increase the chances of starting DEMU services between Ahmednagar and Pune stations.

One of the oldest and important railway projects of Ahmednagar railway station was Kalyan-Ahmednagar railway project which was in planning stage since British regime. It was referred to as 3rd ghat project. The survey of this project was carried out in 1973, 2000, 2006, 2014 etc. This project was in pink book in 2010. Unfortunately, this project could not be completed. The alignment length of this project was 184 km and it could have been shortest route for Marathwada, Andhra and Telangana. The major challenge for this project was proposed 18.96 km tunnel in malshej ghat section.

Malshej Kriti Samiti is following for Kalyan Ahmednagar railway project. Kalyan-Murbad section, the first phase of this project, is already under survey stage.

A survey of Ahmednagar-Aurangabad Railway line with 120 km length was also carried out in March 2021. The DPR Report of this project is under preparation.

Ahmednagar-Karmala railway option is also getting explored. Ahmednagar railway station will become an important railway junction in future to the level similar to Daund railway junction. A Kalyan-Murbad-Ahmednagar line is also possible in future.

=== Road ===
Ahmednagar is well connected by road with major cities of Maharashtra and other states. It has four lane road connectivity to:

- Aurangabad
- Parbhani
- Nanded
- Pune
- Nashik
- Beed
- Solapur
- Osmanabad

National Highway 222 from Kalyan to Nirmal near Adilabad in Telangana passes through the city. The Maharashtra State Road Transport Corporation (MSRTC) and different private transport operators provide bus service connecting the city to all parts of the state.

Ahmednagar has three main bus stands:

- MSRTC Tarakpur Bus Stand – All buses passing through Ahmednagar stop here.
- Maliwada Bus Stand – The buses going to Aurangabad/ Jalgaon/ Akola halt here.
- Pune Bus Stand – Buses going to Pune/Mumbai halt here.

=== Intra-city transport ===
- Autorickshaws, including share autorickshaws
- Bus service established by the Municipal Corporation. The main bus routes in the city are:
- Maliwada Bus Stand to Nirmalnagar via:
  - Delhi Gate
  - Patrakar Chowk
  - Premdan Chowk
  - Professor Colony
  - Pipeline Road
- Maliwada Bus Stand to Dr. Vikhe Patil College, Vilad Ghat via:
  - Delhi Gate
  - Patrakar Chowk
  - Premdan Chowk
  - Savedi Naka
  - Nagapur MIDC
  - New Nagapur
- Maliwada us stand to Kedgaon via:
  - Sakkar Chowk
  - Kinetic Chowk
  - Railway Flyover
  - Ambikanagar
- Maliwada Bus Stand to Bhingar via:
  - Market Yard Chowk
  - Nagar College
  - GPO Chowk
  - Ahmednagar Fort
  - Shukrawar Bazaar
  - Bhingar Wes
- Maliwada Bus Stand to Nimbalak via:
  - Delhi Gate
  - Patrakar Chowk
  - Premdan Chowk
  - Savedi Naka
  - Nagapur MIDC

== Politics ==
Ahmednagar Municipal Council was upgraded to a municipal corporation in 2003. The Ahmednagar Municipal Corporation was constituted and functions under the Maharashtra Municipal Corporation Act, 1949. There are 4 zones and 17 wards under the Corporation. The current Commissioner is Mr. Yashwant Dange and the Deputy Commissioner is Mr. Meher Lahare. The current Mayor of the Corporation is Jyoti Amol Gade with Dhananjay Jadhav serving as Deputy Mayor. The municipal departments are: Accounting Department, Fire Department, Election Department, Audit Department, Advertising department, NULM, Solid Waste Management Department, City Secretary's Department, Computer Department, Establishment Department, Project Department, General Administration Department, Sports Department, Assistant Valuer and Tax Collection Department, Store Department, Market Department, Water Supply Department, Information Facility Center, Town planning, Court Department, Encroachment / Unauthorized Construction Department, Electrical Department, Education Department, Records Department, Labour Department, Blood bank, PWD Department and Census Department.

Ahmednagar city is represented in the central and state legislatures by the Ahmednagar Lok Sabha and Ahmednagar City Vidhan Sabha seats respectively. The sitting MP was Dr.Sujay Vikhe Patil as of 2022, while the sitting MLA was Sangram Jagtap.

The national schemes implemented in Ahmednagar are Prime Minister Housing Scheme, Deendayal Antyodaya Yojana – National and Amrit Mahotsav.

== Media and communication ==
- Newspapers:
  - Lokmat
  - Sakaal
  - Pudhari
  - Sarvamat
  - Deshdoot
  - Punyanagri
  - Saman
  - Loksatta
  - Nava Maratha
  - Nagar Times
  - Divya Marathi
  - Maharashtra Times
  - Samachar
  - Savedi Mitra
- TV channels:
  - CMN Channel
  - News Today 24 Ahmednagar
  - ATV Ahmednagar
- Radio:
  - 104 MY FM
  - AIR Nagar FM
  - Radio City
  - Dhamaal 24
  - Radio Nagar FM
- Internet:

Internet facilities are provided by several service providers.

== Notable people ==
- Malik Ambar, Siddi military leader and guerilla fighter against Mughal Empire
- Sadashiv Amrapurkar, film and theatre actor
- Rajanikant Arole, doctor, Magsaysay award Winner, Padmabhushan
- Meher Baba, spiritual leader
- John Barnabas, evolutionary biologist
- Chand Bibi, Nizamshahi princess, defended Ahmednagar Fort against the Mughal forces of Akbar
- Madhu Dandavate, Indian politician
- Michael J. S. Dewar, theoretical chemist
- Cynthia Farrar, American missionary
- Anna Hazare, Gandhian and social activist
- Adhik Kadam, social activist, social entrepreneur and philanthropist
- Pramod Kamble, painter and sculptor
- Zaheer Khan, cricketer
- Anna Leonowens, educator, feminist, author of The English Governess at the Siamese Court (1870)
- Spike Milligan, 1918–2002, comedian and author
- Shahu Modak, film actor
- Bahirji Naik, head of Intelligence Agency of Maratha Army
- Popatrao Baguji Pawar, Padmashri, Sarpanch Hiware Bazar
- Ajinkya Rahane, cricketer
- Anand Rishiji, Jain saint
- Sai Baba of Shirdi, spiritual master
- Narayan Waman Tilak, Christian writer, poet, pastor
