= Type 98 Chi-Ho medium tank =

Japanese medium tank (WW2)

Type 98 Chi-Ho
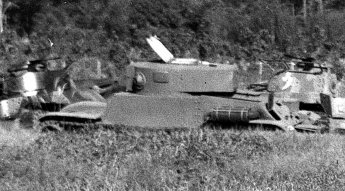
- Type 98 Chi-Ho prototype
- Place of origin: Empire of Japan

Production history
- Designed: 1939
- Produced: 1940–1941
- No. built: 4

Specifications
- Mass: 10.73 tons
- Length: 5.29 m (17 ft 4 in)
- Width: 2.29 m (7 ft 6 in)
- Height: 2.12 m (6 ft 11 in)
- Crew: 4
- Armor: 5–25 mm
- Main armament: Type 1 47 mm tank gun
- Secondary armament: two 7.7 mm Type 1 heavy machine guns
- Engine: Mitsubishi diesel 120 hp/ 1300 rpm
- Suspension: bellcrank
- Maximum speed: 41 km/h (25 mph)

The experimental Type 98 Chi-Ho was a prototype Japanese medium tank. It was developed on orders from the Imperial Japanese Army. "Chi Ho" indicates that it is designated as the 5th (I, Ro, Ha, Ni, Ho) medium (Chi) tank. A total of four prototypes were completed. Two were built in 1940 and two were built in 1941. It did not enter production.

== History and development ==
In the late 1930s, the Imperial Japanese Army was in search for a successor to the Type 89 medium tank. The experimental Type 97 Chi-Ni medium tank was considered as meeting the requirement of a "light and low-cost tank which can be deployed in large numbers"; while the Chi-Ha (later the Type 97 Chi-Ha) was thought as the more effective fighting vehicle for the needs of the military. With the outbreak of the Sino-Japanese war on 7 July 1937, the peacetime budgetary limitations were removed and the more capable and expensive Mitsubishi Chi-Ha model was accepted as the new Type 97 medium tank by the army.

However, the army chief staff did not give up on the idea of a lower-cost and lighter weight medium tank and thus this vehicle was developed. A total of four prototypes were built.

== Design ==
=== External characteristics ===
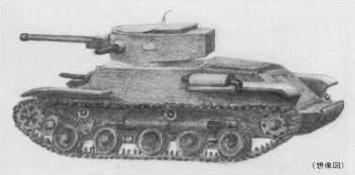
Drawing of a Type 98 Chi-Ho

- The turret resembles that of the later produced Type 97 Shinhoto Chi-Ha.
- There was no cupola and no rear mounted machine gun on the turret. A machine gun was placed in the forward left side of the turret.
- Equipped with the then experimental Type 1 47 mm tank gun.
- Each side had 5 road wheels, using the same bell crank suspension found on other Japanese tanks.
- Fitted with a sled in the rear.
- The muffler was placed in the rear left side of the tank.

=== Armament ===
Heavy emphasis was placed on a gun with a high penetration and the high velocity 47mm tank cannon was selected. Both the Chi-Ni and the Chi-Ha were equipped with a Type 97 57 mm main gun. The cannon was a short-barreled weapon with a relatively low muzzle velocity, but sufficient as the tank was intended primarily for infantry support.

The shortcomings of the Type 97 Chi-Ha, with its low-velocity 57 mm gun, became clear during the 1939 Battles of Khalkhin Gol against the Soviet Union. The 45 mm gun of the Soviet BT-5 and BT-7 tanks out-ranged the Japanese tank gun, resulting in heavy Japanese losses. This convinced the army of the need for a more powerful gun. The following change order looked closely at the next medium tank shortly before this vehicle was completed. In the change order sent to the tank research committee, Showa 14 were design conditions "for the next tank`s turret, even if taking the 57mm cannon into account, further research will be made into firepower. The caliber, if by no choice, will be no smaller than 47mm. The likelihood of being pressed into tank battles in future wars is something that should be considered." This tank's experimental 47mm tank cannon was derived from the research results of the "Experimental type 97 47mm cannon" and the "experimental 47mm cannon". From June 1940, a completed cannon of the experimental 47mm cannon begun various testing and in September, the experimental 47mm tank cannon was mounted on a Type 98 Chi-Ho turret. The turret was then mounted on a Type 97 Chi-Ha's hull and underwent testing. The Type 1 47 mm tank gun was designed specifically to counter the Soviet tanks.

The intention behind the machine gun being mounted in the forward left side of the turret is not clearly known, but it may be akin to a coaxial machine gun. A coaxial machine gun is placed alongside the main armament on the same axle. With that setup, when using the main cannon, the machine can could help predict where the main cannon's fire would land or suppress the enemy while loading the main armament. The machine gun mounted in the Type 98 turret was not a belt-fed type, but rather the Type 97 tank-mounted heavy machine gun, which used 20-round magazines. This presented a limitation in sustaining continuous firing attacks.

=== Mobility and testing ===
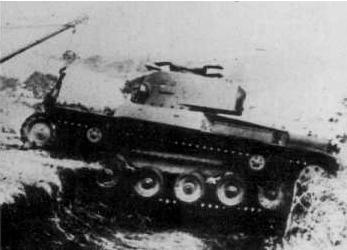
Type 98 Chi-Ho being pulled from tank test bed

The engine mounted in the tank was a Mitsubishi 120 HP diesel engine. Also, it was the first Japanese made tank to use a hydraulic system in the steering system.

Up until then, some advances over the Chi-Ha variants can be seen, but some aspects in the tank hull were still lagging behind. A sled was attached to the rear part of the hull. This is commonly seen on World War I and inter-war tanks. It was thought that by extending the length of the hull, it gained the benefit of crossing trenches, but in that, there was a problem. As a tank mounts a sled, it becomes tail heavy (center of weight shifts backwards) and that presented uncertainty when crossing wide trenches. By becoming tail heavy, the rear portion of the suspension would undertake a greater load and thus wear out faster. Furthermore, the somewhat increase in weight would reduce mobility. With the applied limitations on the tank's weight, it is not believed that the armor protection level could have been improved. Without a cupola, the ability to observe outside would have been worse than the Chi-Ha.

Mitsubishi and Jidosha Kogyo completed the first two prototypes in 1940 and the Kokura and Sagami Arsenals produced two more the following year. After field tests, the tank was not selected for production. The Imperial Japanese Army realized that further research and a better design were needed to counter the 1940s generation of Allied armor, such as the M4 Sherman. A new tank design based on an improved Type 97 design was conceived. The first of this new series was the Type 1 Chi-He medium tank. Work on that design began in 1941. However, production of the Type 1 Chi-He did not begin until 1943, due to the higher priority of steel allocated to the Imperial Navy for warship construction.
