= Type 97 =

Type 97 may refer:

== Japan ==
- Type 97 motorcycle

=== Weapons ===
- Type 97 grenade
- Type 97 sniper rifle
- Type 97 automatic cannon
- Type 97 heavy tank machine gun
- Type 97 aircraft machine gun
- Type 97 81 mm infantry mortar
- Type 97 90 mm infantry mortar
- Type 97 150 mm infantry mortar
- Type 97 Chi-Ni medium tank
- Type 97 Chi-Ha medium tank
- Type 97 ShinHōtō Chi-Ha medium tank
- Type 97 Te-Ke tankette
- Type 97 torpedo
- Type 97 light weight torpedo (G-RX4)
- Army Type 97 command reconnaissance aircraft Mitsubishi Ki-15
- Type 97 Fighter Nakajima Ki-27, a fighter aircraft
- Kawanishi Navy Type 97 Flying Boat

== China ==
- QBZ-97, export model for the QBZ-95 chambered in 5.56x45mm, a bullpup assault rifle manufactured by Arsenal 266
- ZBD-97, an infantry fighting vehicle
- Hawk Industries Type 97, a military shotgun

== Taiwan ==
- T97 pistol, a copy of the Glock 19 but with a manual safety lever
