= Type 4 Ke-Nu light tank =

Type 4 Ke-Nu
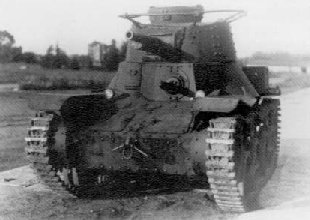
- Type 4 Ke-Nu light tank
- Type: Light tank
- Place of origin: Empire of Japan

Production history
- Designed: 1944
- Produced: 1944
- No. built: approx. 100

Specifications
- Mass: 8.4 tons
- Length: 4.30 meters
- Width: 2.0 meters
- Height: 2.0 meters
- Crew: 3
- Armor: 6–25 mm
- Main armament: Type 97 57 mm tank gun
- Secondary armament: 2x Type 97 7.7 mm machine guns
- Engine: Mitsubishi A6120VDe air-cooled inline 6-cylinder diesel 120 HP
- Power/weight: -
- Suspension: bellcrank
- Operational range: 240 km
- Maximum speed: 40 km/h

The Type 4 Ke-Nu (四式軽戦車 ケヌ, Yon-shiki keisensha Kenu) was a light tank of the Imperial Japanese Army in World War II. It was a conversion of existing Type 95 Ha-Go light tanks, re-fitted with the larger turret of the Type 97 Chi-Ha medium tank.

== History and development ==
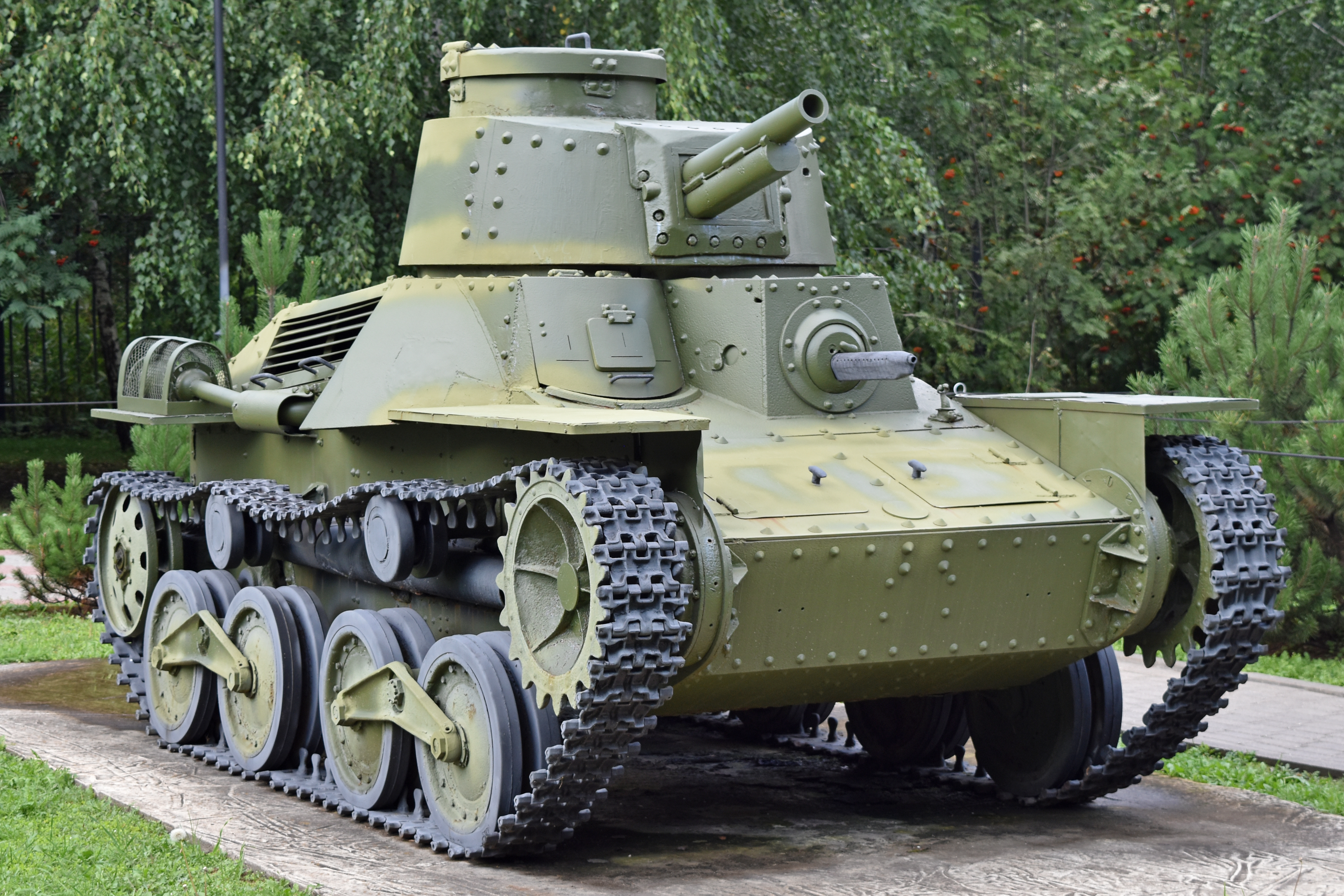
Mockup of a Type 4 Ke-Nu at Victory Park, Museum of the Great Patriotic War, Moscow

The Type 4 Ke-Nu was a variant of the Type 95 Ha-Go light tank. The original Type 97 Chi-Ha medium tank was armed with a low muzzle velocity 57 mm tank gun. Operational experience against the Soviet Red Army at Nomonhan during the Soviet–Japanese border conflicts in 1939 revealed that this gun was inadequate against opposing armor, and a new higher velocity 47 mm tank gun was developed. This was installed in the Type 97 Chi-Ha with a larger turret to produce the Type 97-kai Shinhoto version. This left a number of surplus Type 97 Chi-Ha turrets, which were later retrofitted onto the hulls of the obsolete Type 95 Ha-Go light tank. The result was designated the Type 4 Ke-Nu. The retrofitting did decrease the problem of cramped turret place for the crew, which had been encountered in an earlier attempt to up-gun Type 95 light tanks with a 57 mm tank gun in a prototype known as the Type 3 Ke-Ri light tank. According to several estimates, approximately 100 tanks were converted late in World War II. An exact number of the tanks converted is not known.

== Designation ==
While most sources contend that the vehicle describe in this article is the Type 4 Ke-Nu, several researchers have argued that this designation is based on incorrect identification, and the tank is not a Ke-Nu. According to Japanese author and researcher Akira Takizawa, the vehicle that combined the Chi-Ha turret with the Ha-Go hull has no currently known formal designation, and its previous identification as the Ke-Nu is "incorrect." Takizawa instead argues that the Type 4 Ke-Nu, is a variant of the Type 2 Ke-To light tank with a new turret and a Type 1 47 mm tank gun. Twenty-eight incomplete tanks were found at the Kobeseiko factory at the end of war.

According to the Russian tank researcher Yuri Pasholok, the Chi-Ha turret and Ha-Go hull combination was designated Type 3 Ke-Ru in the Imperial Japanese Army tank indexes. He further argues, similar to Takizawa, that the Ke-Nu was a variant of the Type 2 Ke-To and the previous identification of the vehicle as the Ke-Nu was a "mistake." This idea is further corroborated by an additional Japanese source, which also contends that the Ke-Nu was a variant of the Ke-To, while the Ke-Ru is the correct name for the Chi-Ha turret and Ha-Go hull combination.

General (ret.) Tomio Hara, who started as one of four engineers on the Japanese indigenous tank project in 1925 and later became the head of the tank development department, post-war wrote that the "Type 3 light tank" was a program of mounting a Type 57 mm tank gun into a slightly modified turret of a Type 95 Ha-Go light tank in an attempt to increase its firepower. He went on to write that the "Type 4 light tank" was a program of mounting the old Ch-Ha turrets with their original Type 57 mm tank gun onto a Type 95 Ha-Go hull. He does not give a further designation name to either light tank.

== Design ==
Essentially a Type 95 light tank with a Type 97 medium tank gun turret, the Type 4 Ke-Nu had slightly better firepower, but the retrofitting increased the weight of the tank to 8.4 tons. This reduced the top speed of the tank to 40 km/h. Given the replacement turret had thicker armor, it did provide the crew with some additional protection in that area, but did nothing to alleviate the Type 95's greatest weakness of the lack of suitable armor protection for the hull. Maximum armor protection for the tank (25 mm) was provided by the Type 97 turret, but it was defeated by the 37 mm, 75 mm and 2-pounders mounted on Allied tanks.

== Combat record ==
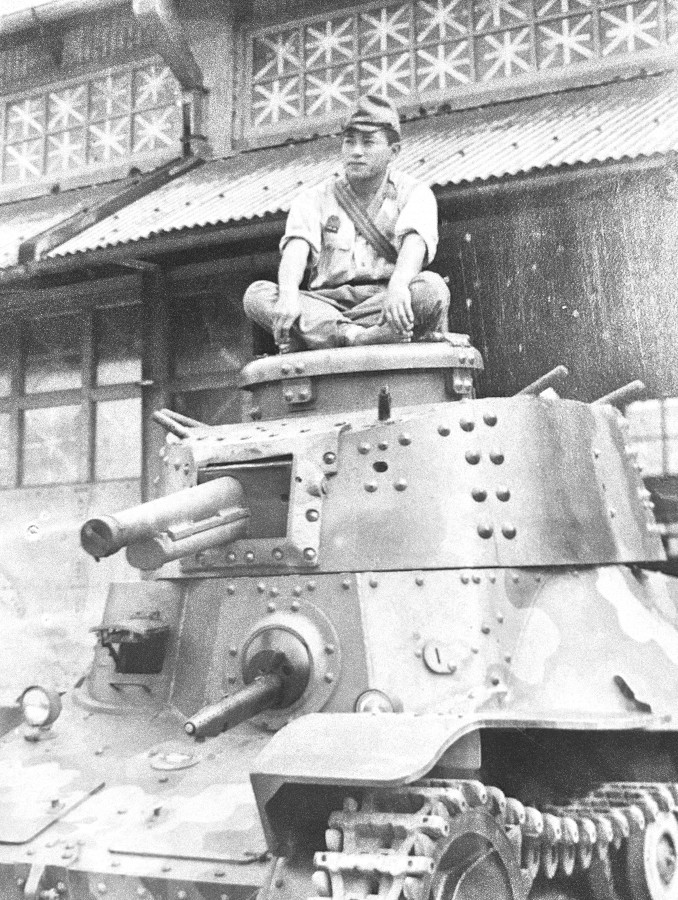
Close up of Type 4 Ke-Nu

The conversion coming in 1944 was too late to make any impact on Japanese combat operations. Some were assigned to units in Korea and Manchukuo, and saw brief combat against Soviet Red Army forces in the Soviet invasion of Manchuria.

== Survivors ==
There are no known complete and intact surviving Type 4 Ke-Nu tanks. However, there are claimed to be two surviving examples on display at the Museum of the Great Patriotic War, Moscow and the Kubinka Tank Museum. According to the Russian Researcher, Yuri Pasholok, both of these vehicles are museum made mockups. The example on display at the Museum of the Great Patriotic War combines a Ha-Go hull with a mockup Chi-Ha turret. The example on display at Kubinka has a Ha-Go hull with an original Chi-Ha turret welded to it.
