= Chiha =

Chiha (in Arabic شيحة or شيحا) is an Arabic-based surname. It may refer to:

== People ==
- Danny Chiha, Lebanese rugby league footballer
- Michel Chiha (1891–1954), Lebanese banker, a politician, writer and journalist
- Patric Chiha, Austrian film director famous for If It Were Love (or in French Si c'était de l'amour)

== See also ==
- Banque Pharaon & Chiha, was a Lebanese bank, founded in 1876 by Antoine Chiha and headquartered in Beirut. It was one of the oldest Lebanese banks that were still operating until being acquired by Byblos Bank in 2016
- Kim Chi-ha, or Kim Jiha (born 1941), Korean poet and playwright
- Shiha (disambiguation), alternative spelling of the Arabic surname Chiha
- Type 97 Chi-Ha medium tank, a Japanese medium tank of the Second World War
