= Type 97 Chi-Ni medium tank =

Experimental Prototype Type 97 Chi-Ni
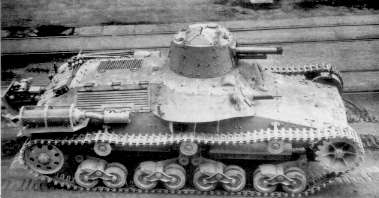
- Prototype Type 97 Chi-Ni
- Place of origin: Empire of Japan

Production history
- Designed: 1935–1937
- Produced: 1936
- No. built: 1 (prototype)

Specifications
- Mass: 9.8 t (9.6 long tons; 10.8 short tons)
- Length: 5.26 m (17 ft 3 in)
- Width: 2.23 m (7 ft 4 in)
- Height: 2.33 m (7 ft 8 in)
- Crew: 3
- Armour: 8–25 mm
- Main armament: One Type 97 57 mm tank gun
- Secondary armament: One 7.7 mm Type 97 machine gun
- Engine: Mitsubishi A6120VDe air-cooled inline 6-cylinder diesel 120 hp (89.5 kW) at 1400 rpm,135 hp (100 kW) at 2000 rpm
- Suspension: bellcrank
- Operational range: 200 kilometers
- Maximum speed: 30 km/h (19 mph) on road

The Experimental Medium Tank Chi-Ni (試製中戦車 チニ Shisei-chū-sensha chini) was a prototype Japanese medium tank. Initially proposed as a low-cost alternative to the Type 97 Chi-Ha medium tank, it was eventually passed over by its competitor.

== History and development ==
In 1935 news had reached Japan of the United Kingdom's development of a new tank, the A6 medium tank. A multi-turreted design that mounted a 47 mm tank gun and was capable of reaching speeds of 50 km/h. In comparison, Japan's tank force had not undergone any significant changes in tactics or organization in six years. The country's widely fielded medium tank, the Type 89 I-Go, while popular with troops and tank crews had begun to show its age, attempts to update the design with the Type 89B I-Go Otsu were made in 1934, but no fundamentally new design was undertaken. In comparison, the A6 was seen as having superior offensive and defence capabilities over the Type 89 I-Go. Britain's new tank design, along with reports from Manchuria of the Type 89's inability to keep up with other motorized vehicles–given its inadequate 25 km/h top speed–brought about plans for a replacement.

Tank designers recommended research on a new tank design, a medium tank capable of going 35 km/h and weighing 15 tons with offensive and defensive abilities greater than the Type 89 I-Go. The Chief-of-Staff Operations was not enthusiastic for the project as it was peace-time and the military had a limited budget. The army thus issued peace time requirements for a new tank design. Rather than focusing on performance improvements, the Chief-of-Staff Operations made a lighter weight the main requirement in order to lower production costs. The finalised requirements were for a lighter weight tank that was capable of going 35 km/h, and armed with a 57 mm main gun. The Engineering Department believed that it was highly regrettable that their efforts would be devoted solely to weight reduction, so instead, two concurrent projects were built. The first plan was for a lower-weight, low-cost medium tank that was to be made by the Osaka Army Arsenal, which would become the Chi-Ni. The second plan was contracted to Mitsubishi Heavy Industries for a higher performance medium tank, which would become the Chi-Ha.

== Design ==
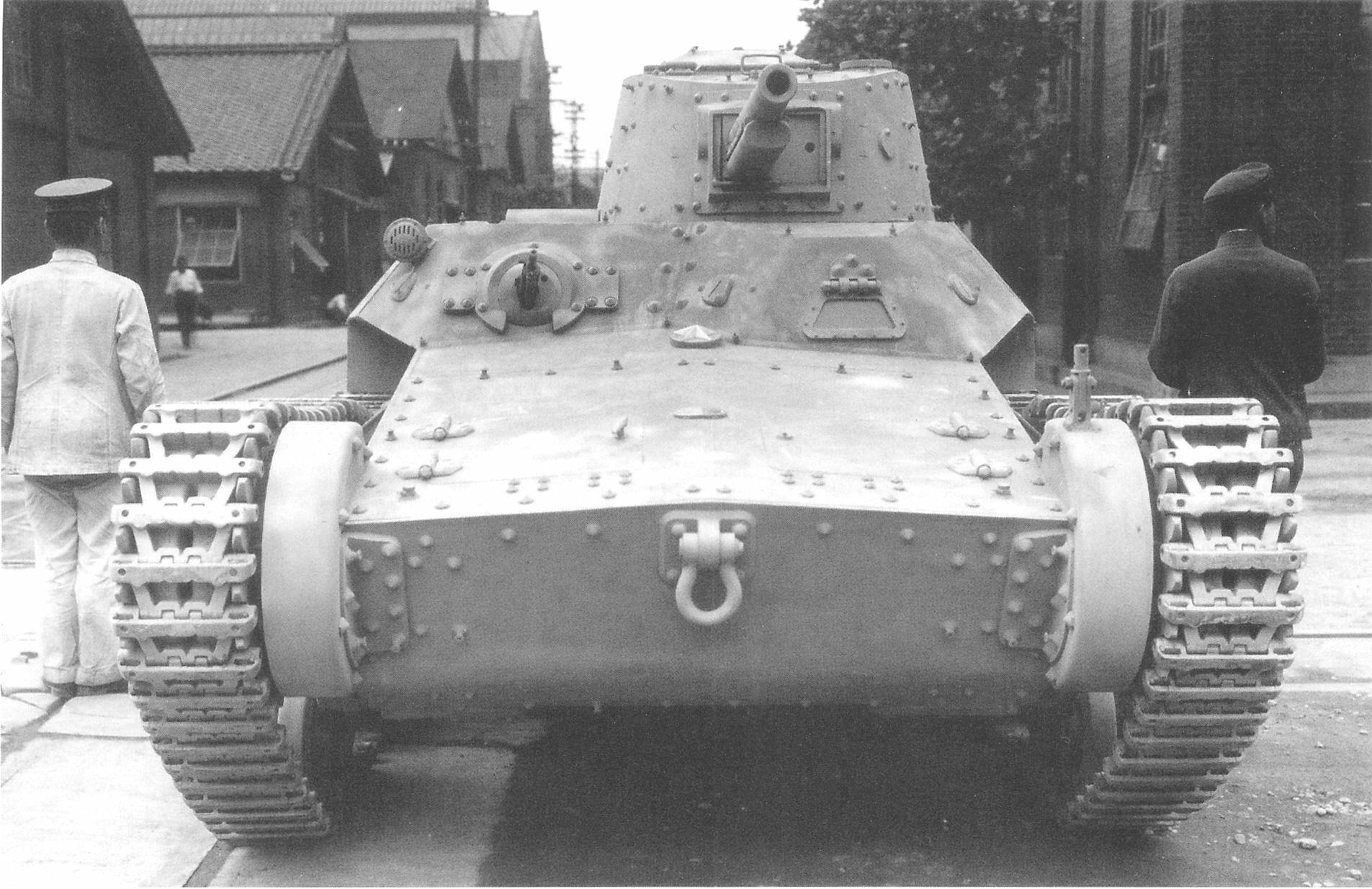
Type 97 Chi-Ni, front view

The initial design requirements for the two prototypes:

Type 97 medium tank requirements
Requirements	Plan 1/Chi-Ni	Plan 2/Chi-Ha
Speed	27 km/h (17 mph)	35 km/h (22 mph)
Trench crossing ability	2.4 m (7 ft 10 in) (with tail extension)	2.5 m (8 ft 2 in)
Armour thickness	20 mm	25 mm
Weight	10.0 t (9.8 long tons; 11.0 short tons)	13.5 t (13.3 long tons; 14.9 short tons)
Crew	3	4
Armament	One 57 mm tank gun, one machine gun	One 57 mm tank gun, two machine guns

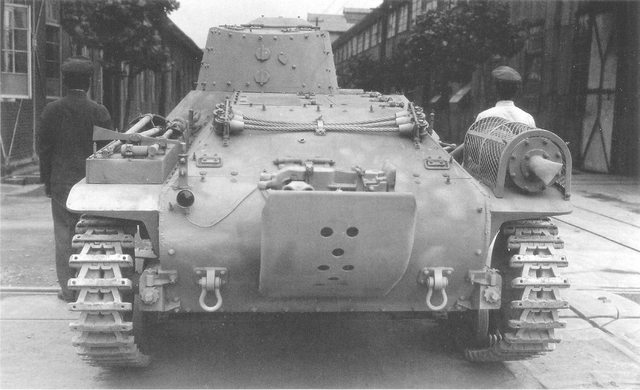
Type 97 Chi-Ni, rear view with a removable ditching tail

The Chi-Ni was envisioned as a smaller, lighter alternative to the Chi-Ha, a medium tank closer to the original Chief-of-Staff Operations preference for more "lightly armored infantry support vehicles". The hull was of a monocoque design and welding was used more extensively than previous tanks. This was unlike previous Japanese tanks, which were all riveted around a framework. The Chi-Ni also shared the same bell crank scissors suspension as the Chi-Ha that would continue to be used by later Japanese tanks until the end of the Second World War. The hull was designed with a streamlined silhouette to protect from shell damage. The crew of the Chi-Ni, unlike the Chi-Ha was only made up of three men, with the tank commander acting as both a gunner and loader in the small, single-man turret. The turret did not have room for any coaxial machine gun. The driver was seated in the hull on the left hand side, with the third crew member, a machine gunner, was seated to right of the driver. The tank was initially planned to be armed with the Type 89 I-Gos Type 90 57 mm gun, but a new tank gun was being designed at the time to replace the lower velocity gun. This improved tank gun was the Type 97 57 mm tank gun. A single, forward firing, 7.7×58mm Arisaka Type 97 machine gun was mounted in the hull. The diameter of the turret ring for both tanks was made as large as possible to allow for any future up-gunning of the tanks. The tank was powered by a Mitsubishi 135 hp diesel engine. There are also documents stating that the Chi-Ni was tested with a 120 hp Mitsubishi A6120VDe air-cooled diesel engine from a Type 95 Ha-Go. The Chi-Ni was equipped with a 'tadpole tail', a tail extension attached to the back of the tank to allow it to better cross trenches. Both prototypes were completed and tested in early 1937.

== Production ==
Type 97 medium tank prototype performance
Prototypes	Plan 1/Chi-Ni	Plan 2/Chi-Ha
Speed	30 km/h (19 mph)	38 km/h (24 mph)
Trench crossing ability	2.5 m (8 ft 2 in) (with tail extension)	2.5 m (8 ft 2 in)
Armour thickness	25 mm	25 mm
Weight	9.8 t (9.6 long tons; 10.8 short tons)	15.0 t (14.8 long tons; 16.5 short tons)
Length	5.26 m (17.3 ft)	5.55 m (18.2 ft)
Crew	3	4
Armament	One 57 mm tank gun, one machine gun	One 57 mm tank gun, two machine guns

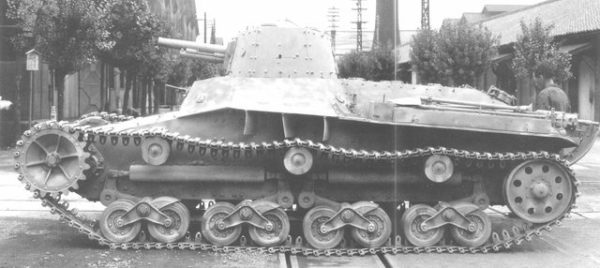
Type 97 Chi-Ni - opposite, side view

During the time of the Chi-Ni and Chi-Ha trials, the China Incident occurred on 7 July 1937, sparking a war with China. With the out-break of hostilities the peacetime budgetary limitations were removed and the more capable and expensive Mitsubishi Chi-Ha model was accepted as the new Type 97 medium tank by the army. The Type 97 Chi-Ha would go on to be the most numerically important Japanese medium tank of the Second World War. Only a single Chi-Ni prototype was built. Even though the Chi-Ni was passed over in favour of the Chi-Ha, several individuals in the Japanese military, such as Japanese Army tank designer Lieutenant General Tomio Hara, believed that there was still potential in the design and the tank could be reused in the future as a light tank.

== See also ==
- Japanese tanks of World War II
- List of engines and weapons used on Japanese tanks during World War II
- List of Japanese armoured fighting vehicles of World War II
