= Japanese ship Shii =

At least two Japanese naval ships have been named Shii (椎 / しい, "castanopsis") :

- Japanese destroyer Shii, a Tachibana-class destroyer of the Imperial Japanese Navy during World War II
- JDS Shii (PF-17, PF-297), a Kusu-class patrol frigate of the Japan Maritime Self-Defense Force, formerly USS Long Beach (PF-34)

== See also ==
- Shii (disambiguation)
