= List of engines and weapons used on Japanese tanks during World War II =

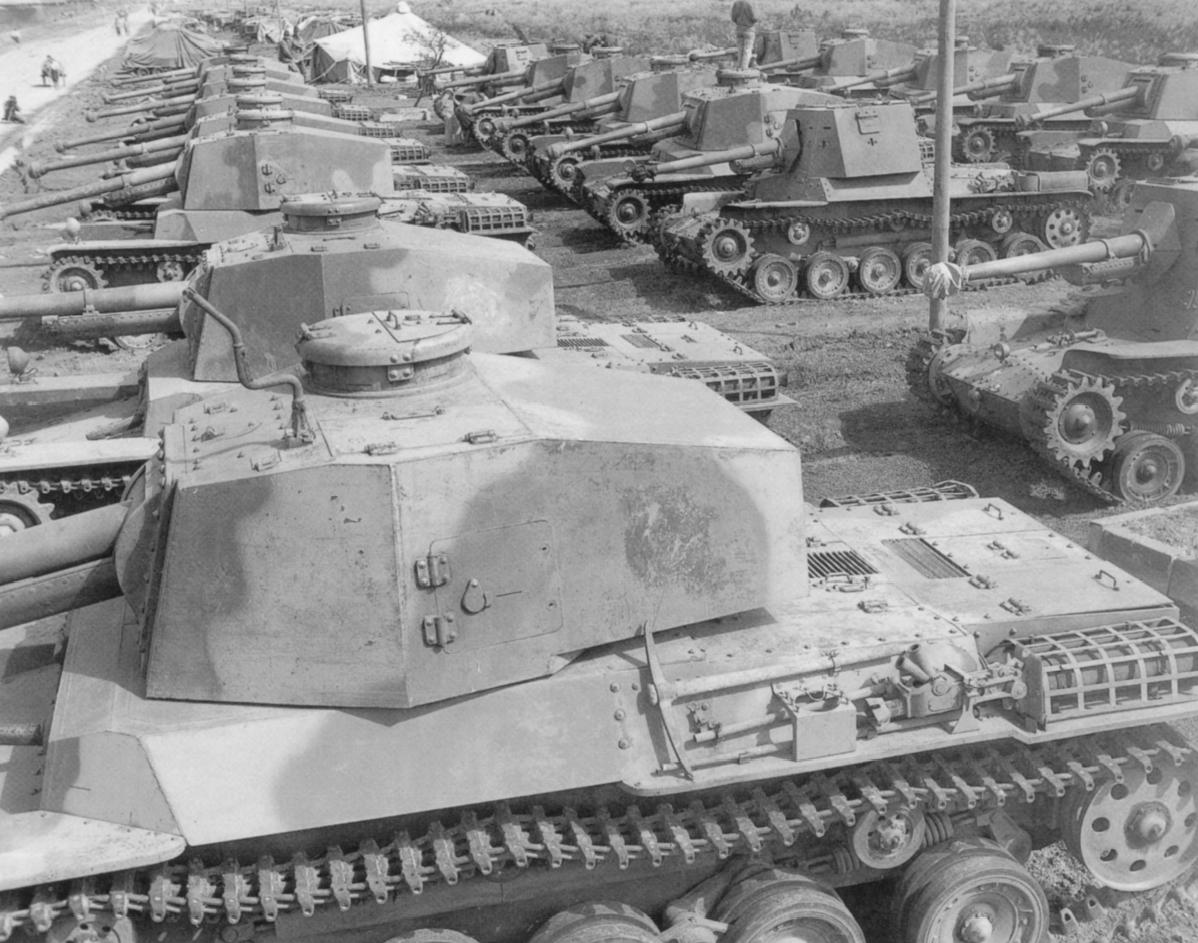
Type 3 Chi-Nu medium tanks and Type 3 Ho-Ni III tank destroyers in 1945

This is a list of engines and weapons used on Japanese tanks during World War II.

== Tank engines ==
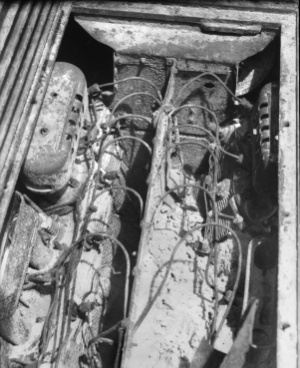
New Guinea - Top view of the engine in an armoured recovery variant of the Type 97 Chi-Ha tank, which was captured on the beach

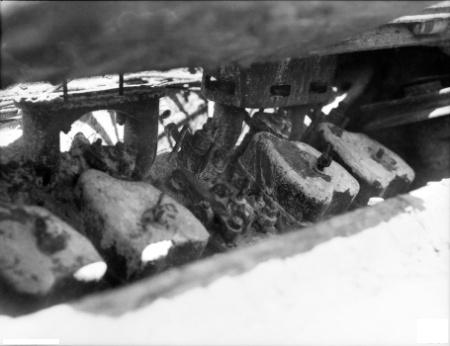
New Guinea - left view of the same engine

- Mitsubishi/Ishikawajima In6 air-cooled 6-cylinder gasoline engine 45(petrol) PS/1600 rpm of 45 hp (34 kW)
- Mitsubishi A6120VD-cylinder air-cooled petrol diesel of 120 hp (90 kW)
- Mitsubishi diesel engine 120 PS
- Mitsubishi petrol engine 35 PS/2500 rpm
- Mitsubishi gasoline engine 290 PS/1600 rpm
- Mitsubishi gasoline engine 50 PS/2400 rpm
- Mitsubishi diesel engine 65 PS/2300 rpm
- Mitsubishi air-cooled 4-cyl. petrol of 32 hp (24 kW)
- Ikegai air-cooled 4-cylinder diesel of 48 hp (36 kW)
- Mitsubishi NVD 6120 air-cooled diesel engine 120 PS/1800 rpm of 120 hp (89 kW)
- Mitsubishi Type 97 V-12 21.7 L diesel engine 170 PS/2000 rpm of 170 hp (130 kW)
- Mitsubishi air-cooled 6-cylinder diesel of 115 hp (86 kW)
- Mitsubishi Type 100 air-cooled V-12 diesel engine 130 PS/2100 rpm of 130 hp (97 kW)
- Mitsubishi Type 100 air-cooled V-12 diesel (petrol)of 170 hp
- Mitsubishi water-cooled 6cyl gasoline/diesel engine 115 PS/1800 rpm of 115 hp
- Mitsubishi Type 100 air-cooled V-12 diesel engine 240 PS/2000 rpm of 240 hp (179 kW)
- Mitsubishi Type 4 V12 Diesel Engine 400 PS/1800 rpm with supercharger of 400 hp
- (BMW) Kawasaki Ha-9 V12 gasoline engine PS/1500 rpm of 550 hp
- Engine straight 6 diesel of 145 hp
- Electric motor 2HP (Ko) and 4HP (Otsu)

== Armored car engines ==
- diesel engine (petrol) 134 PS/2000 rpm of 134 hp
- diesel engine (petrol) 65 PS/2300 rpm of 65 hp
- air-cooled engine V8 gasoline of 130 hp

== Tank and armored car armament ==
=== Tank guns ===
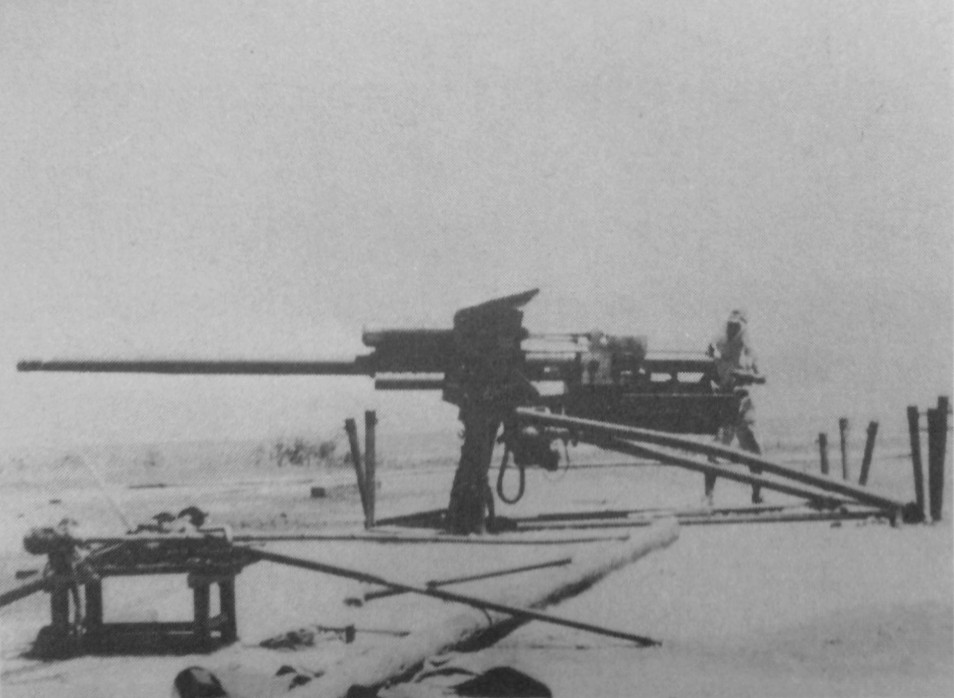
Type 5 75 mm tank gun Mark I

- Type 90
- Type 97
- Type 94
- Type 98
- Type 100
- Type 1
- Type 99
- Type 3
- Type 5

=== Tank and armored car machine guns ===
- Type 91 tank machine gun, variant of the Type 11 light machine gun
- Type 97 heavy tank machine gun

== Tank and armored vehicle radio communicators ==
- Radio set Type 94/Mk 4 Otsu, (Year 1934)
- Radio set Type 94/Mk 4 Hei, (Year 1934)
- Radio set Type 96/Mk 2 Bo, (Year 1941)
- Radio set Type 96/Mk 4 Bo, (Year 1941)
- Radio set Type 3 Ko, (Year 1943)
- Radio set Type 3 Otsu, (Year 1943)
- Radio set Type Hei, (Year 1943)
