= Gongchen tank =

First tank in service with the Chinese People's Liberation Army

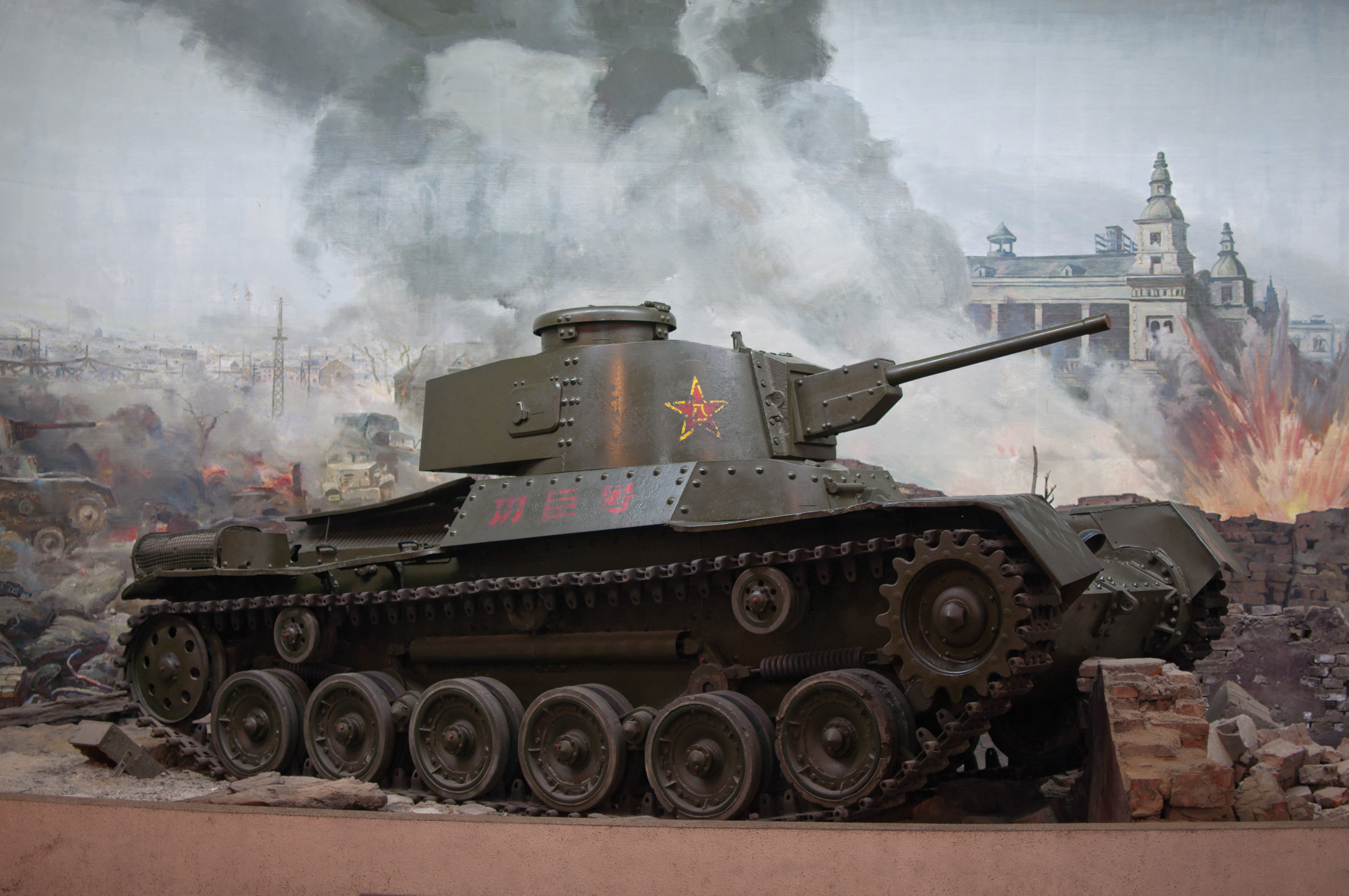
The "Gongchen tank" displayed at the Beijing Military Museum

The Gongchen tank (Chinese: 功臣號; pinyin: gōngchénhào) is the Chinese designation of a Japanese-built Type 97 ShinHōtō Chi-Ha medium tank used within the People's Liberation Army. It was the first tank used by the PLA, and saw service during the Chinese Civil War against the National Revolutionary Army.

== History ==
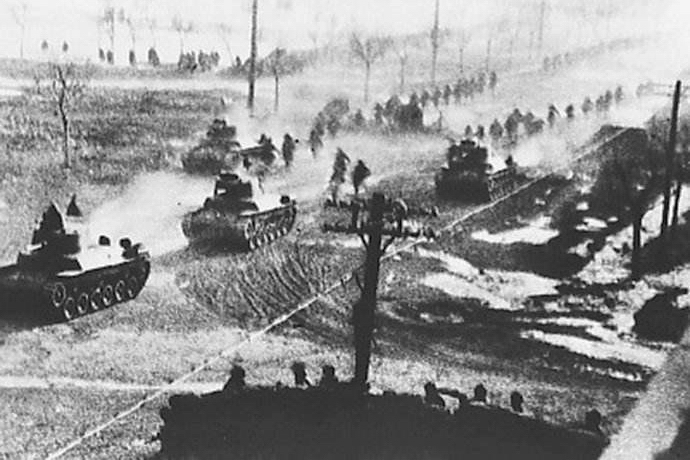
Type 97 Chi-Ha tanks of the PLA advancing into Shenyang in 1948

Following the end of the Second Sino-Japanese War in October 1945, a surplus of Type 97 Chi-Ha medium tanks originally belonging to the Imperial Japanese Army remained in China after the surrender of Japan, as a result of the immediate cessation of war. The majority of these tanks were surrendered to the Kuomintang forces. Chinese communist forces within northeast China uncovered a pair of tanks at the IJA arsenal located in Shenyang. These tanks were the Type 97 upgraded versions known as the Type 97 ShinHōtō Chi-Ha. They had enlarged turrets, and a Type 1 47 mm main turret gun.

The two tanks were given the designations 101 and 102, and were secured along with a group of Japanese technical personnel. However, the Japanese technicians staged a mutiny and sabotaged 101, leaving only 102 intact and functional, which the communists were able to safely transfer to communist-controlled areas. On 1 December 1945, the first tank squadron of the People's Liberation Army, named the Northeast Special Tank Brigade (Chinese: 東北特縱坦克大隊), was formed in Shenyang, consisting of only 30 members and one tank.

As the civil war escalated into full-blown conflict in 1946, the tank forces of the People's Liberation Army progressed into forming the Northeast Tank Regiment (Chinese: 東北戰車團), with the main force made up of Type 97 Chi-Ha tanks. During the Battle of Jinzhou in 1948, the tank designated as 102 took the lead in a breakthrough against the defensive perimeter of the Kuomintang forces, opening a path for communist infantry to advance. Following the battle, the tank driver Dong Laifu (董來扶) and machine gunner Wu Peilong (吳佩龍) were commended as "first class", and the tank designated as 102 was renamed "Gongchen".

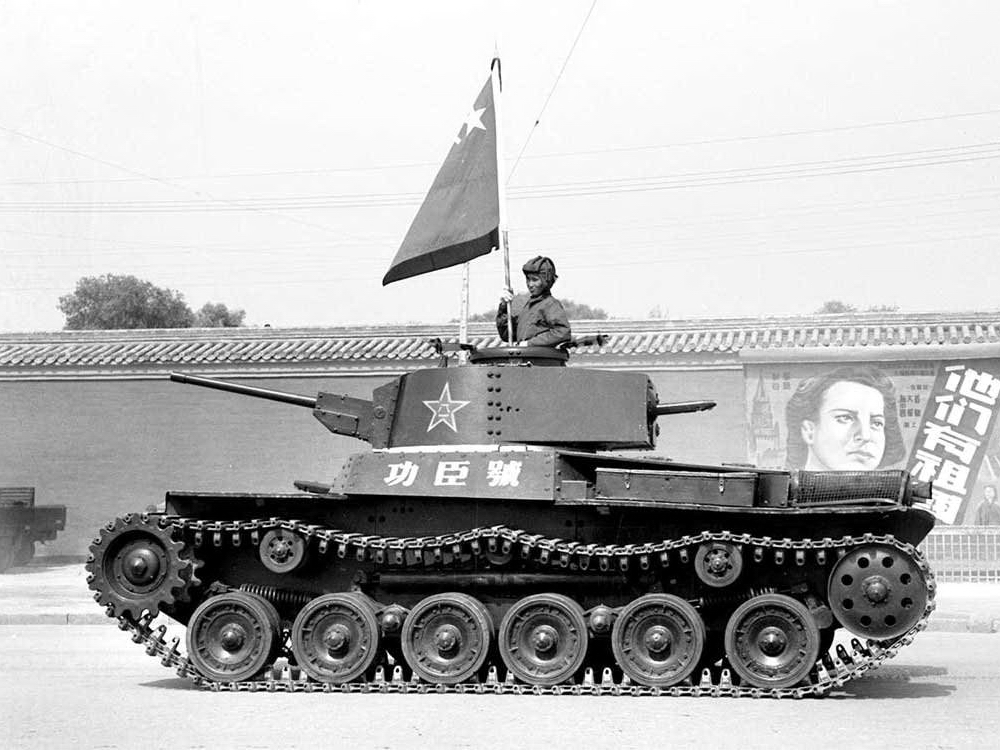
Gongchen tank in 1949

Afterwards, Gongchen took part in the Liaoshen Campaign and Tianjin Campaign, and drove within the walls of Peiping on 3 February 1949. As the People's Republic of China was formed on 1 October 1949, Gongchen was the leading tank in the military parade at Tiananmen Square.

As China received more Soviet-manufactured tanks from the Soviet Union during the Korean War period, Japanese-manufactured tanks were recalled from the battle lines and limited to use as training vehicles. In 1959, Gongchen was formally retired and kept within the Military Museum of the Chinese People's Revolution.

== Characteristics ==
The Gongchen underwent a number of modifications whilst in the hands of the People's Liberation Army, including an extended lower front plate which spreads up to the drive wheel, and the removal of side armour plates at the engine mount. Some Type 97s in PLA service were reportedly equipped with 500HP Kharkiv model V-2 engines for a brief time, but the vehicles on display all have their engines removed.

Whilst the Type 97 Chi-Ha tank was classified as a medium tank by the Imperial Japanese Army, the People's Liberation Army, heavily influenced by Soviet war doctrine, classed the tank as a light tank in official documents.
