= Shii =

Shii can refer to:

- Shi'a Islam
- The Japanese name of the tree genus Castanopsis
- Shii-chan, the cat from Kamichama Karin
- Kazuo Shii, Chairman of the Japanese Communist Party
- Japanese ship Shii, several Japanese ships

== See also ==
- Shia (disambiguation)
- Shiha (disambiguation)
