= Shia (disambiguation) =

Shia (Shiʽa) refers to the second largest denomination of Islam.

Shia or SHIA may also refer to:

== Places ==
- Shia, Ghana, a village in the Volta Region of Ghana

== People ==
- Shia LaBeouf (born 1986), American actor
- Toshia Mori (1912–1995), American actress credited as Shia Jung in one film
- Shia Chun Kang (born 1996), Malaysian badminton player
- Howie Shia, Canadian animator

== Other uses ==
- Shia, a character from the manga Pita-Ten
- Soekarno–Hatta International Airport, serving Jakarta, Indonesia

== See also ==
- Shii (disambiguation)
- Shiha (disambiguation)
