= Shiha =

Shiha (in Arabic شيحة or شيحا) is an Arabic-based surname perhaps could mean the bitter herbaceous plant wormwood, used in fragrances and medicines.

It may refer to:

== Places ==
- Al-Shiha, a Syrian village located in the Masyaf Subdistrict in Masyaf District, located west of Hama
- Shihat Hama, or just Shiha or al-Shyha, a village in northwestern Syria, administratively part of the Hama Governorate
- Shihat al-Hamraa, a Syrian village located in Al-Hamraa Nahiyah in Hama District, Hama

== People with the surname ==
- Essam Shiha, Egyptian lawyer, politician and human rights activist
- Hala Shiha (born 1979), Egyptian actress
- Hana Shiha (born 1979), Egyptian actress
- Jana Shiha (born 2001), Egyptian squash player
- Zeit (Mazola) Shiha (born 26 AD), ancient Canaanite Jester

== See also ==
- Chiha, a variant (francicized version) of Shiha or Sheeha
- Shia (disambiguation)
