= Shihat al-Hamraa =

Shihat al-Hamraa شيحة الحمراء
- Village
- Location in Syria
- Coordinates: 35°20′32″N 37°13′11″E
- Country: Syria
- Governorate: Hama
- District: Hama
- Subdistrict: Hamraa

Population (2004)
  - Total: 741
- Time zone: UTC+2 (EET)
  - Summer (DST): UTC+3 (EEST)
- City Qrya Pcode: C3094

Shihat al-Hamraa (Arabic: شيحة الحمراء) is a Syrian village located in Al-Hamraa Nahiyah in Hama District, Hama. According to the Syria Central Bureau of Statistics (CBS), Shihet Elhamra had a population of 741 in the 2004 census.
