= Type 97 57 mm tank gun =

Japanese army tank armament during World War II

The Type 97 57 mm tank gun was originally the main armament of the Imperial Japanese Army Type 97 Chi-Ha medium tank during the Second World War.

== Design and use ==
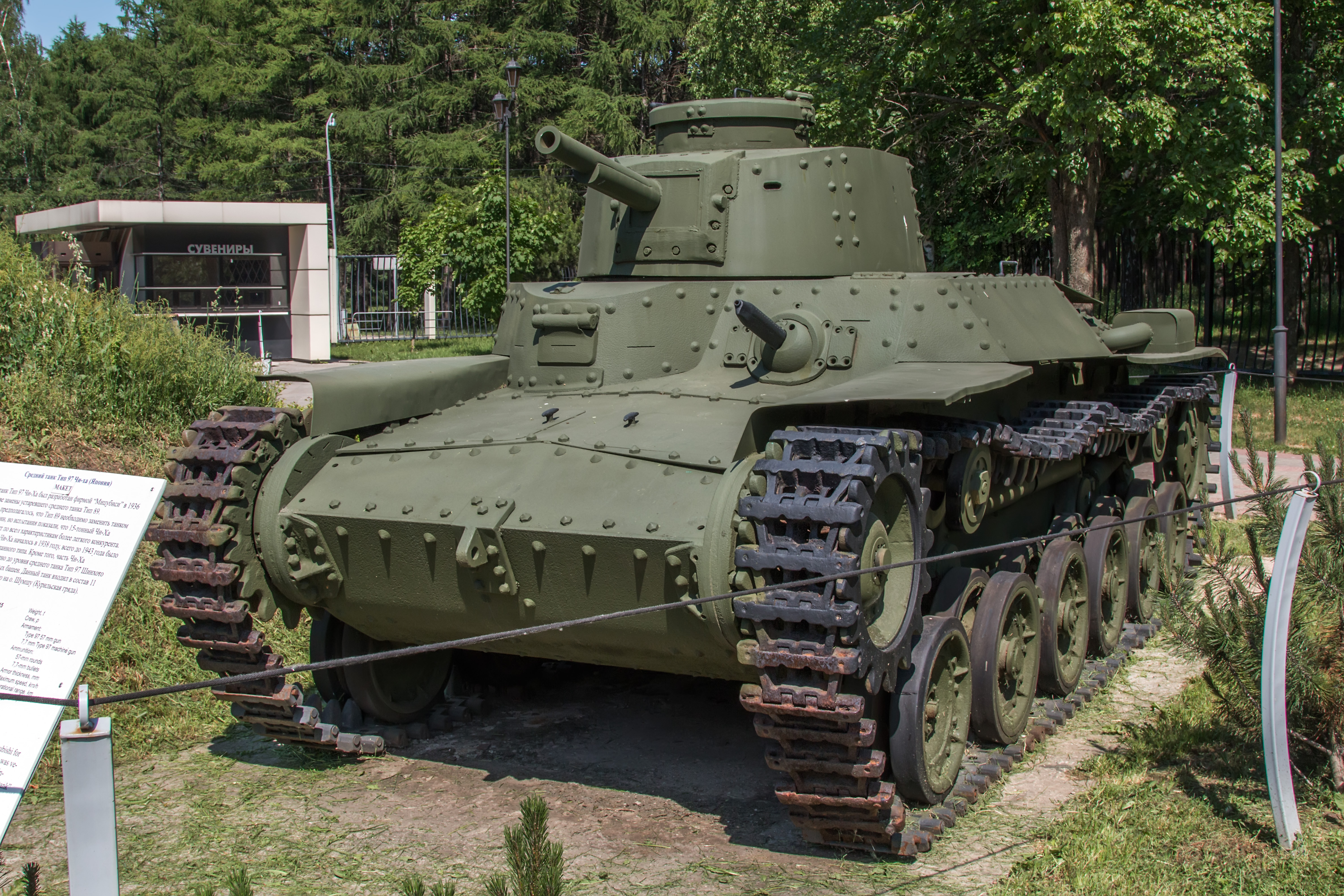
Type 97 Chi-Ha medium tank with the Type 97 57 mm tank gun

The Type 97 Chi-Ha tank was the most widely produced Japanese medium tank of the war, although the armor protection was average for a 1930s tank. The Type 97 57 mm tank gun was an improved version (as to function and durability) of the Type 90 57 mm main gun that was used in the Type 89 medium tank. The gun was a short barrelled weapon with a relatively low muzzle velocity, which was sufficient for supporting the infantry. However, in 1939 during the Battles of Khalkhin Gol (Nomonhan) against Soviet BT Tanks, the gun proved to be insufficient against the Soviet armor, causing the Japanese Army to suffer heavy tank losses.

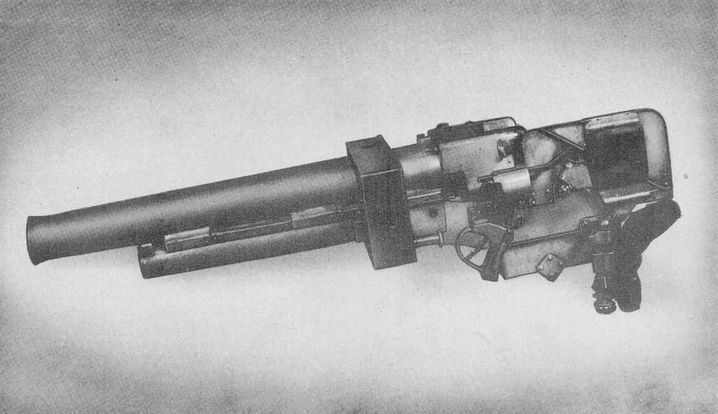
57 mm tank gun Type 97

After Nomonhan, new tank guns were developed for the Chi-Ha with a calibre of 47 mm - less than 57 mm tank gun - but having a longer barrel, and better penetration than the Type 97 gun. From 1942 onwards, the Type 97 tanks were armed with the high velocity Type 1 47 mm tank gun in a new larger turret, and were designated the Type 97-Kai Shinhoto Chi-Ha.

=== Specifications ===
The Type 97 57 mm tank gun had the following specifications:

- Calibre: 57 mm
- Barrel length: 18.5 calibre (1.057 m)
- Muzzle velocity: 355.3 m/s (1,166 ft/s)
- Elevation: -15 to +20 degrees
- Penetration 20 mm at 500 m
- Shell:
- AP
- HEAT
- HE: 250 grams of filler (TNT)
- Weight: 1.80 kg,
- Length: 189 mm
- Diameter: 55 mm diameter
