= Type 97 ShinHōtō Chi-Ha medium tank =

Type 97 Shinhōtō Chi-Ha
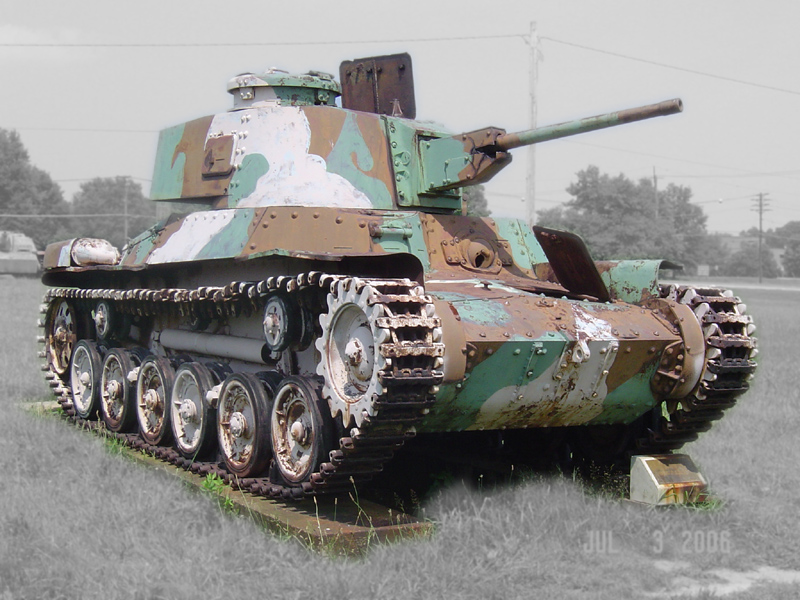
- Type 97 Shinhōtō Chi-Ha on display at the United States Army Ordnance Museum in Aberdeen
- Type: Medium tank
- Place of origin: Empire of Japan

Production history
- Designed: 1939–1941
- Produced: 1942, forward
- No. built: 930

Specifications (Type 97-Kai as of 1942)
- Mass: 16 tonnes (18 tons)
- Length: 5.50 m (18 ft 1 in)
- Width: 2.33 m (7 ft 8 in)
- Height: 2.38 m (7 ft 10 in)
- Crew: 5 (Commander, gunner, loader, bow gunner, driver)
- Armor: Turret front: 33 mm Turret sides: 26 mm Hull front: 25 mm Hull sides: 26 mm Hull rear: 20 mm
- Main armament: 1 x Type 1 47 mm tank gun
- Secondary armament: 2 x 7.7 mm Type 97 machine gun
- Engine: Mitsubishi SA12200VD air-cooled V-12 diesel (21.7 litres); 170 hp (125 kW) at 2,000 rpm
- Suspension: bellcrank
- Operational range: 210 km (130 mi)
- Maximum speed: 38 km/h (24 mph)

The Type 97 Shinhōtō Chi-Ha (Japanese: 九七式新砲塔中戦車チハ, romanized: Kyūnana-shiki Shin Hōtō Chū-Sensha Chi-ha) was a Japanese medium tank used in World War II that was an upgrade to the original Type 97 Chi-Ha. The new version was designated Type 97-Kai ("improved"), Shinhōtō Chi-Ha ("new turret" Chi-Ha) or simply "Type 97/47". Armed with a Type 1 47 mm tank gun, this design was considered to be the best Japanese tank to have seen combat service during the Pacific War. It first saw combat service at Corregidor Island in the Philippines in 1942.

== Development ==
Japanese Army observers had watched tank developments in Europe and studied as avidly as any European military the operational experiences gained by German, Soviet, and Italian tanks in the Spanish Civil War (1936-1939). In addition, the shortcoming of the Type 97 Chi-Ha armed with its low-velocity 57 mm main gun became clear during the 1939 Battles of Khalkhin Gol against the Soviet Union. The 45 mm gun of the Soviet BT-5 and BT-7 tanks out-ranged the 57 mm tank gun, resulting in heavy Japanese losses.

The army commanders were convinced of the need for a more powerful gun. In order to improve the anti-tank capability of the Type 97 Chi-Ha, a new enlarged three-man turret armed with a new high-velocity Type 1 47 mm tank gun was combined with the Chi-Ha's hull; hence the new name Kai ("improved") or Shinhōtō ("new turret"). In 1942, it replaced the original model Type 97 in production. In addition, "about 300" of the Type 97 tanks with the older model turret and 57 mm main gun were converted.

== Combat history ==
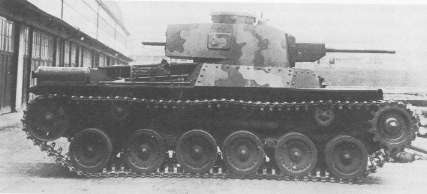
Side view of a Type 97 Shinhōtō Chi-Ha

When the Type 97 entered service, properly equipped and supported, mechanized infantry units were realized. Type 97 Shinhōtō tanks were first used in combat during the Battle of Corregidor in the Philippines in 1942. A special company known as the "Matsuoka Detachment" was formed from the 2nd Tank Regiment and sent to the Philippines. According to an after-action report, they performed well in combat by "silencing several American defensive positions".

The Japanese commanders showed a "skillful and imaginative use of tanks" during the early string of victories of the Japanese military forces. The skill with which they maneuvered their mechanized infantry divisions was best seen in the Japanese invasion of Malaya, where the lighter weight of Japanese medium tanks allowed for a rapid ground advance so heavily supported by armor that British defenders never had a chance to establish effective defense lines.

During the Battle of Guam, 29 Type 97 and Type 95 tanks of the IJA 9th Tank Regiment and nine Type 95s of the 24th Tank Company were lost to bazooka fire or M4 tanks. At the Battle of Okinawa, 13 Type 95s and 14 Type 97 Shinhōtō medium tanks of the understrength IJA 27th Tank Regiment faced 800 American tanks of eight US Army and two USMC tank battalions. The Japanese tanks were defeated in their counter-attacks of 4–5 May 1945. Similar conditions were repeated in the Kwantung Army's defense against the Soviet invasion of Manchuria, although there was little tank-versus-tank action. The Soviet Red Army captured 389 tanks.

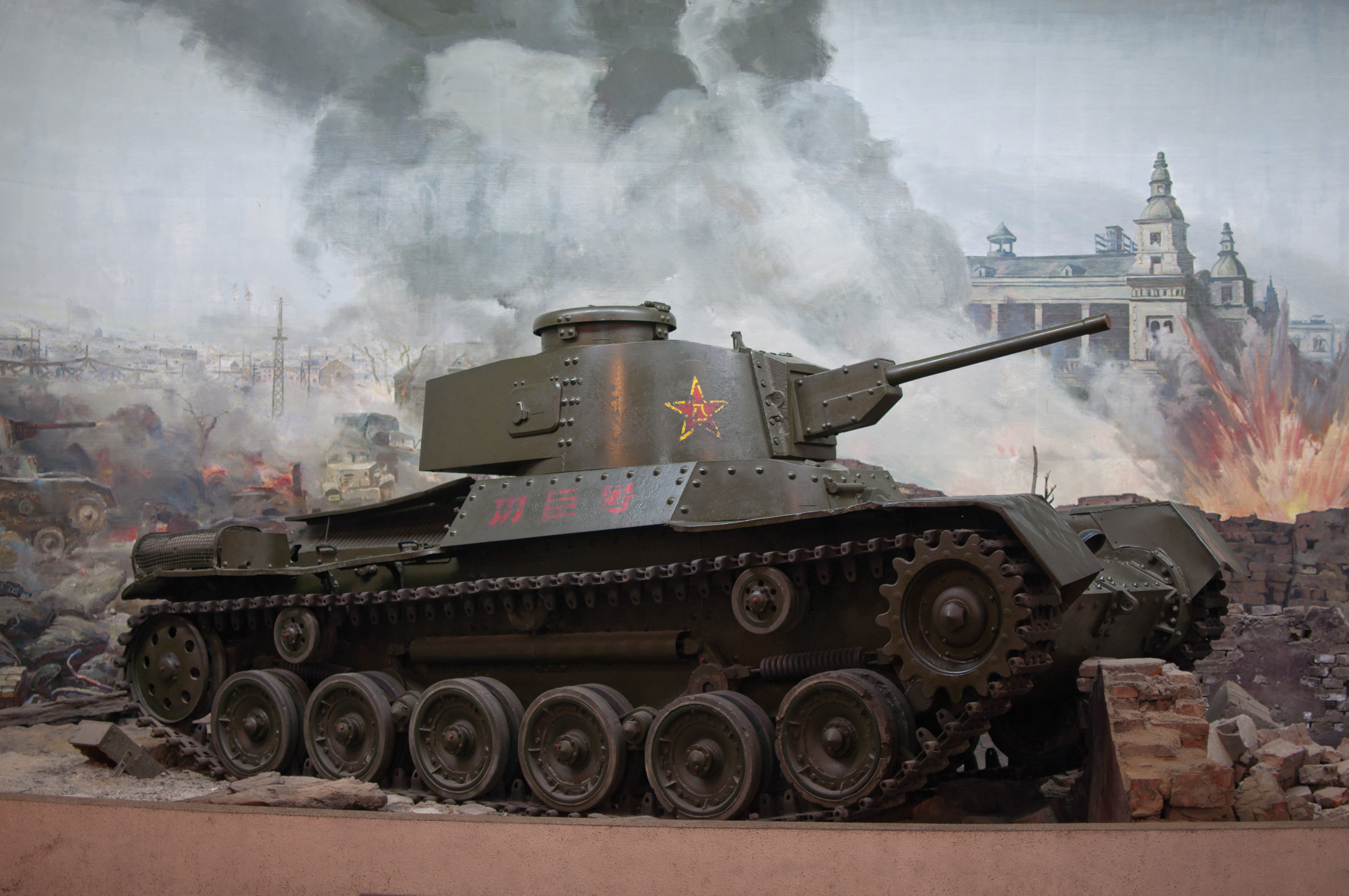
Type 97 Shinhōtō Chi-Ha "Gongchen tank" at the Beijing military museum

While vulnerable to opposing Allied tanks (such as the M4 Sherman and Soviet T-34), the 47 mm high-velocity gun did give the Type 97 Shinhōtō a fighting chance against them. The 47 mm gun was effective against light tanks and against the sides and rear of the Sherman tank. For this reason, some Shinhōtō Chi-Ha tanks were dug in concealed positions to ambush the American tanks and others were dug in to form the core of defense "strong points" during the battles for Luzon and Iwo Jima in 1945. The Type 97 Shinhōtō Chi-Ha served against allied forces throughout the Pacific and East Asia as well as the Soviets during the July–August 1945 conflict in Manchuria. It is considered to be the best Japanese tank to have seen combat service in the Pacific War.

Some Japanese tanks remained in use, postwar during the Chinese Civil War. After the end of World War II, IJA tanks captured by the Soviets were turned over to the Communist Chinese army. After victory, the Chinese People's Liberation Army (PLA) continued to use them in their inventory. The PLA's force of 349 tanks in 1949 included many Type 97 Shinhōtō Chi-Ha tanks.

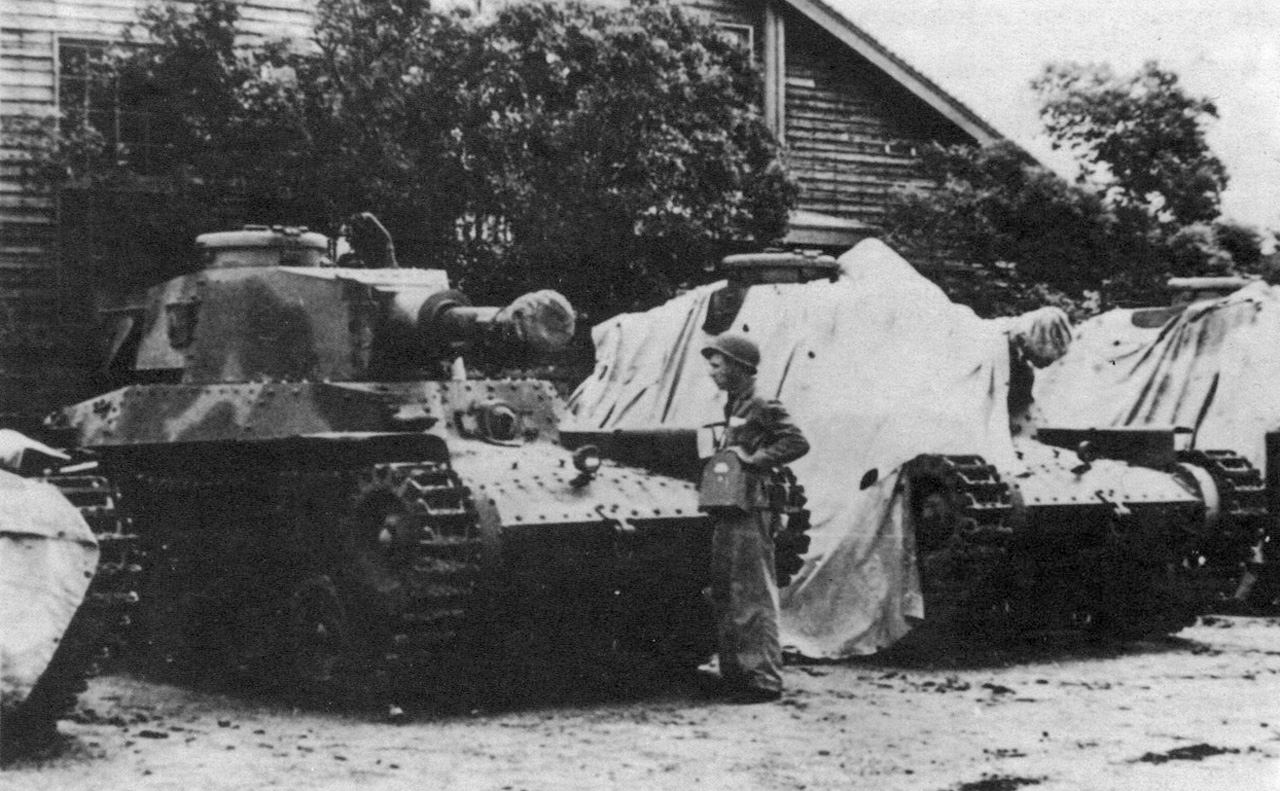
Short barrel 120 mm gun tanks at the Naval Yard in Sasebo

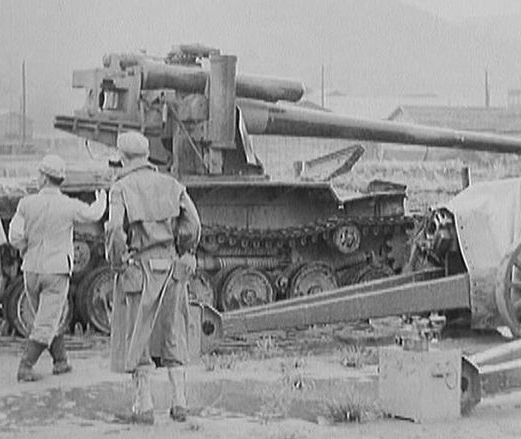
Long barrel 120 mm SPG being demonstrated to US Army personnel, post-surrender

== Variants ==
=== Short barrel 120 mm gun tank ===
This was a variant of the Type 97 Shinhōtō Chi-Ha produced late in the war for the Imperial Japanese Navy. They wanted a gun tank similar to the Type 2 Ho-I for close support, but with greater fire-power. The standard 47 mm main tank gun was replaced with a short barrel naval 12 cm (120 mm) "anti-submarine" gun with a muzzle brake added. In addition, it had a small storage compartment added onto the back of the Shinhōtō Chi-Ha turret. Only "about a dozen" were produced for deployment by the Japanese Special Naval Landing Forces for defense of the home islands.

=== Long barrel 120 mm SPG ===
There was a "one-off" prototype developed by the Imperial Japanese Navy known as the Naval 12 cm SPG (self-propelled gun) or Long barrel 120 mm SPG. A Type 10 120 mm main gun was mounted backwards on a Type 97 Chi-Ha chassis. The gun was not housed in a turret like the short barrel 120 mm version and did not have a casemate. The post-war fate of the completed prototype deployed at the Yokosuka SNLF base is unknown.

== See also ==
- Japanese tanks of World War II
- List of Type 97 Chi-Ha variants
