= Type 97 Chi-Ha medium tank =

Type 97 Chi-Ha
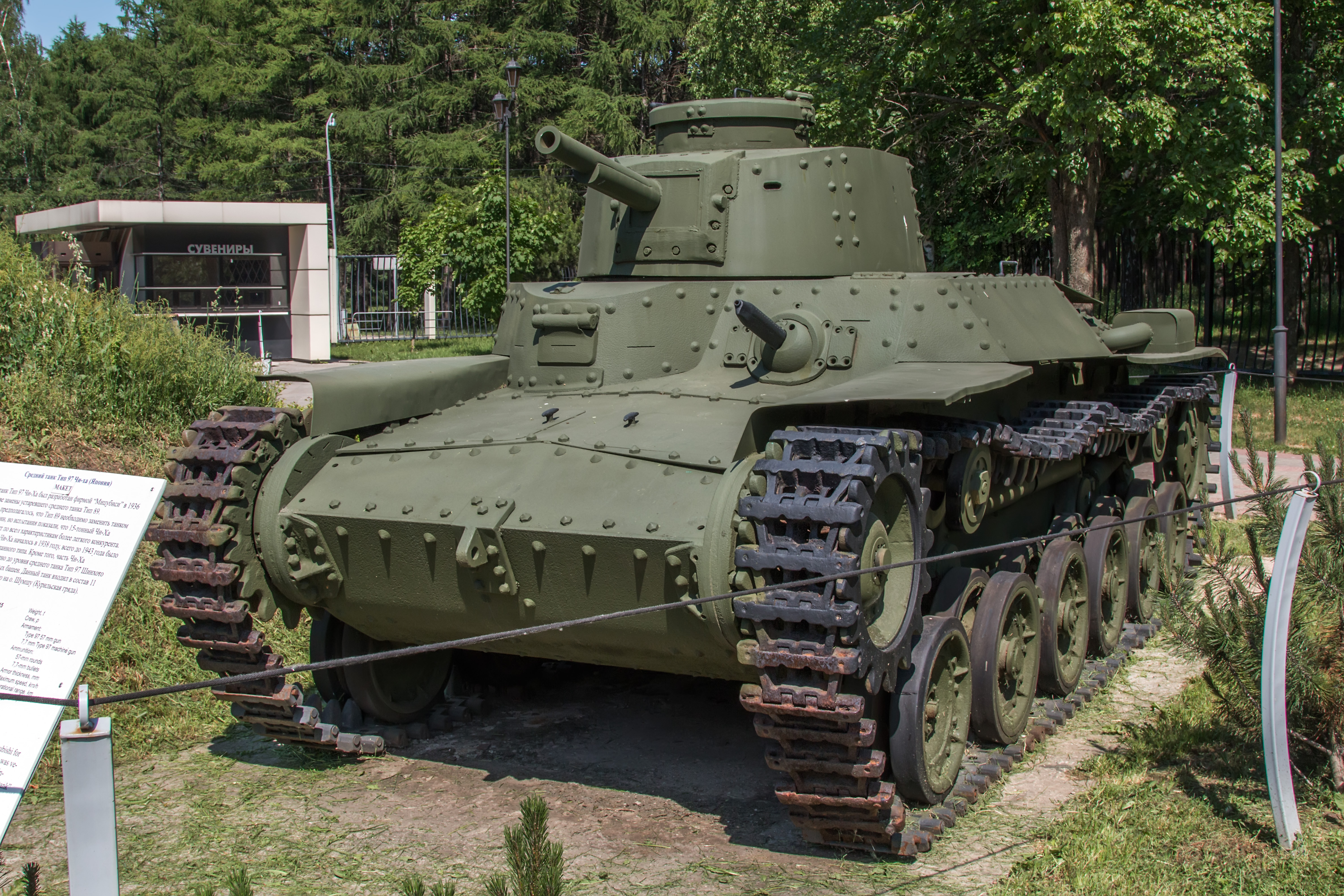
- Type 97 Chi-Ha medium tank on display at the Museum of the Great Patriotic War in Russia
- Type: Medium tank
- Place of origin: Japan

Service history
- Used by: See Operators
- Wars: Second Sino-Japanese War; Soviet–Japanese border conflicts; World War II; Indonesian National Revolution; Chinese Civil War; Korean War

Production history
- Designed: 1936
- Unit cost: 126,000 yen (US$33,856) in August 1939, excluding armaments
- Produced: 1938–1943
- No. built: 1,162 (plus 930 of Type 97-Kai)
- Variants: Type 97-Kai Shinhōtō Chi-Ha

Specifications (Type 97 Chi-Ha as of 1941)
- Mass: 14.3 tonnes (15.8 tons) to 15.2 tonnes (16.8 tons)
- Length: 5.50 m (18 ft 1 in)
- Width: 2.33 m (7 ft 8 in)
- Height: 2.21 m (7 ft 3 in)
- Crew: 4
- Armor: 8–25 mm (25 mm on gun mantlet)
- Main armament: Type 97 57 mm tank gun
- Secondary armament: 2 × 7.7 mm Type 97 machine guns
- Engine: Mitsubishi SA12200VD air-cooled V-12 diesel (21.7 litres); 170 hp (127 kW) at 2,000 rpm
- Power/weight: 11.3 hp/tonne
- Suspension: bellcrank
- Operational range: 210 km (130 mi)
- Maximum speed: 38 km/h (24 mph)

The Type 97 Chi-Ha (九七式中戦車 チハ, Kyūnana-shiki chū-sensha Chi-ha or simply "Type 97/57") was a medium tank used by the Imperial Japanese Army during the Second Sino-Japanese War, the Battles of Khalkhin Gol against the Soviet Union, and the Second World War. It was the most widely produced Japanese medium tank of World War II.

The 57 mm main gun, designed for infantry support, was of the same caliber as was used in the Type 89 I-Go medium tank. The suspension was derived from the Type 95 Ha-Go light tank, but used six road wheels instead of four. The 170 hp Mitsubishi air cooled diesel engine was a capable tank engine in 1938.

The Type 97's low silhouette and semicircular radio antenna on the turret distinguished the tank from its contemporaries. After 1941, the tank was less effective than most Allied tank designs. In 1942, a new version of the Chi-Ha was produced with a larger three-man turret, and a high-velocity Type 1 47 mm tank gun. It was designated the Type 97-Kai ("improved") or Type 97 Shinhōtō Chi-Ha (Japanese: 新砲塔チハ; "New turret Chi-Ha").

== History and development ==
With the Type 89 I-Go fast becoming obsolete in the late 1930s, the Imperial Japanese Army (IJA) began a program to develop a replacement tank for infantry support. Experience during the invasion of Manchuria determined that the Type 89 was too slow to keep up with motorized infantry. The new medium tank was intended to be a scaled-up four-man version of the Type 95 Ha-Go light tank, although with a two-man turret, thicker armor, and more power to maintain performance.

The Tokyo factory of Mitsubishi Heavy Industries completed a prototype designated Chi-Ha. The second prototype was completed in June 1937. Although the requirement was for a 47 mm gun, it retained a short-barreled 57 mm gun akin to the Type 89 tank main gun. However, at the time IJA was also interested in the lighter and less expensive Type 97 Chi-Ni prototype proposed by Osaka Army Arsenal, which had the same 57 mm main gun. With the out-break of the Second Sino-Japanese War on 7 July 1937, the peacetime budgetary limitations were removed and the more capable and expensive Mitsubishi Chi-Ha model was accepted as the new Type 97 medium tank by the army.

== Japanese tank designations ==
Chi (チ) came from Chū-sensha (チュウセンシャ, "medium tank"). Ha and Ni, in Japanese army nomenclature, refer to model number 3 and 4, respectively from old Japanese alphabet iroha. The Type was numbered 97 as an abbreviation of the imperial year 2597, corresponding to the year 1937 in the standard Gregorian calendar. Therefore, the name "Type 97 Chi-Ha" could be translated as "1937's medium tank model 3".

== Design ==
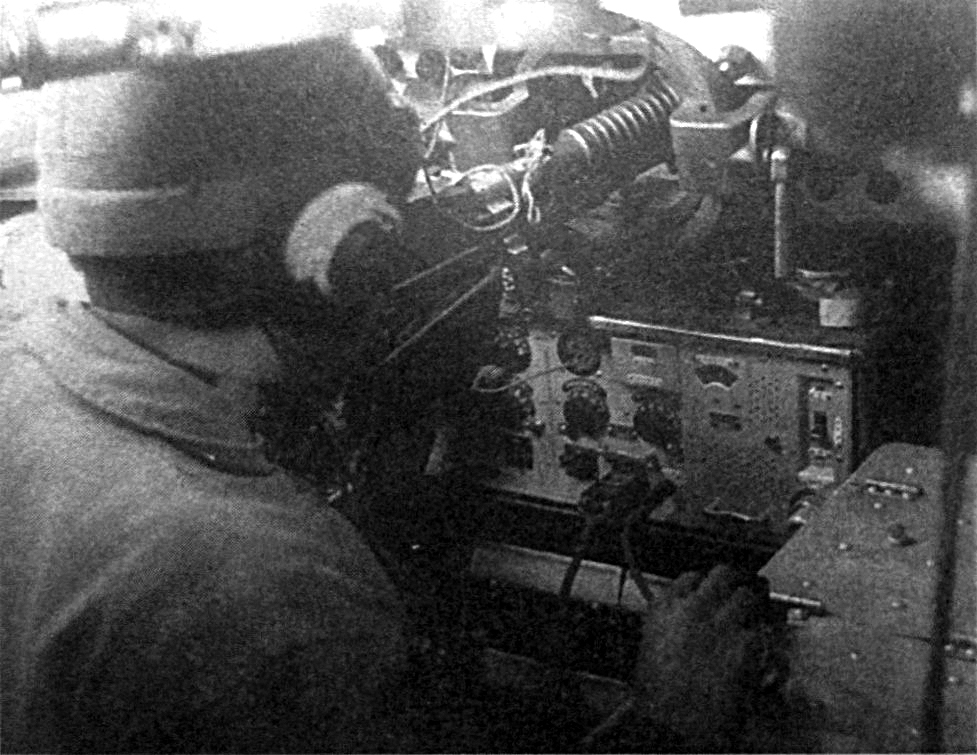
Type 97 Chi-Ha radio operator and vehicle Radio Set Type 96 Mark 4 Bo.

The Type 97 hull was of riveted construction with the engine in the rear compartment. The tank had a four-man crew including a driver, bow machine-gunner, and two men in the turret. In the forward compartment, the driver sat on the right, and bow gunner on the left. The commander's cupola was placed atop the turret. Internal communications were by 12 push buttons in the turret, connected to 12 lights and a buzzer near the driver.

The Type 97 tank was equipped with a Type 97 57 mm main gun, the same caliber used for the earlier Type 89 I-Go tank gun. The Type 97 57 mm tank gun was an improved version (as to function and durability) of the Type 90 57 mm main gun. The cannon was a short-barreled weapon with a relatively low muzzle velocity, but sufficient as the tank was intended primarily for infantry support. The main gun had no elevation gear, therefore, the gunner used his shoulder to elevate it.

The tank carried two 7.7 mm Type 97 machine guns, one on the front left of the hull and the other in a ball mount on the rear of the turret. The turret was capable of full 360-degree traverse, but the main gun was in a "semi-flexible mount" allowing a maximum 10-degree traverse independently of the turret.

The thickest armor used was 25 mm on the gun mantlet and 15–25 mm on the hull front. Power was provided by an air-cooled V-12 21.7 liter diesel Mitsubishi SA12200VD engine, which provided 170 hp (127 kW).

=== Development of the improved Shinhōtō Chi-Ha ===
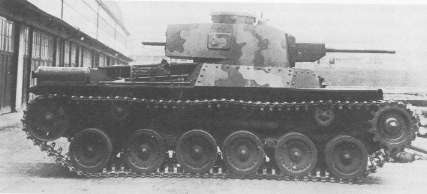
Type 97 Shinhōtō Chi-Ha medium tank

The shortcomings of the Type 97, with its low-velocity 57 mm gun, became clear during the 1939 Battles of Khalkhin Gol against the Soviet Union. The 45 mm gun of the Soviet BT-5 and BT-7 tanks out-ranged the Japanese tank gun, resulting in heavy Japanese losses. This convinced the army of the need for a more powerful gun. Development of a new 47 mm weapon began in 1939 and was completed by the end of 1941. It was designed specifically to counter the Soviet tanks. A variant known as the Type 1 47 mm tank gun was produced. The gun's longer barrel generated much higher muzzle velocity, resulting in armor penetration superior to that of the 57 mm gun. The 47 mm tank gun was mounted in a new, larger three-man turret creating a new version of the Type 97. It was designated the Type 97 Shinhōtō Chi-Ha ("new turret" Chi-Ha) or Type 97-Kai ("improved") or simply Type 97/47. It replaced the original model in production in 1942. In addition "about 300" of the Type 97 tanks with the older model turret and 57 mm main gun were converted.

== Production ==
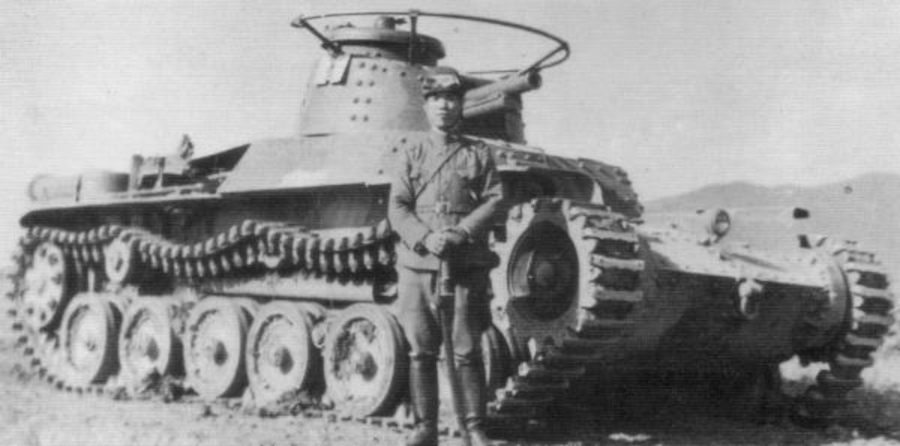
Type 97 Chi-Ha, front-angle view with IJA officer

The Type 97 medium tank was manufactured by Mitsubishi Heavy Industries and Hitachi Industries, as well as some limited production in the Army's Sagami Arsenal. The number of Type 97 medium tanks produced was slightly lower than of the Type 95 Ha-Go light tanks, but larger than any other tank fielded by Empire of Japan. The following number of units were produced for the years 1938 to 1943:

Type 97 Chi-Ha tank (57 mm gun):

- 1938: 110
- 1939: 202
- 1940: 315
- 1941: 507
- 1942: 28
- Total: 1,162

Type 97-Kai Shinhōtō Chi-Ha tank (47 mm gun):

- 1942: 503
- 1943: 427
- Total: 930

Total production of the 57 mm & 47 mm gun Type 97 medium tanks was 2,092. Although production peaked in 1943 it was the last year any Type 97 was produced, as factories switched to the new tank designs, most notably the Type 1 Chi-He medium tank.

== Further development ==
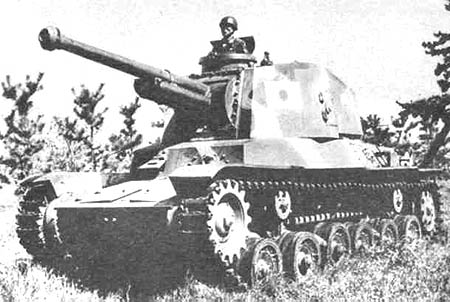
Type 3 Chi-Nu medium tank

The last design that was based directly on Type 97 lineage was the Type 3 Chi-Nu medium tank with a 75 mm main gun of which 144 were built from 1944 to 1945. The Type 3 Chi-Nu retained the same chassis and suspension of the Type 97 based Type 1 Chi-He tank, but with a large new hexagonal gun turret and a commander's cupola. The Type 4 Chi-To was a separate design, the last Japanese medium tank design to be completed during the war, considered equivalent to the German Panther tank, but with only two known to be completed by war's end. By that time, the Japanese industry had been badly crippled by the American bombing campaign; as a result, few of these newer vehicles were ever built.

The IJA's need to supplement their tank units with artillery led to a need for self-propelled guns (SPGs). Subsequently, the Type 97 chassis was utilized to manufacture nearly a hundred SPGs, consisting primarily of 75 mm guns. Since the IJA's 1930s-era tanks didn't have the firepower to penetrate the 1940s generation of Allied armor, a need for tank destroyers arose, and experiments ranging from 47 mm to 120 mm guns were conducted. However, due to naval priorities, raw materials for any IJA production were limited.

== Combat history ==
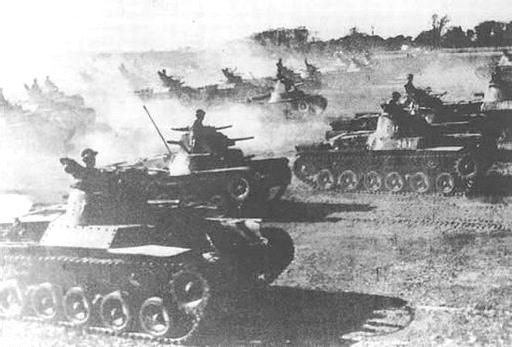
Type 97 Chi-Ha and Type 95 Ha-Go tanks of the Chiba Tank School during a military exercise (1940)

The Type 97 was deployed in China in combat operations in the Second Sino-Japanese War with considerable success, as the ill-equipped National Revolutionary Army of the Republic of China forces were limited to only three tank battalions consisting of British exports of the Vickers, German Panzer Is, and Italian CV33 tankettes.

Its first real test in combat against opposing armor came with the Battles of Khalkhin Gol in July 1939 against the Soviet Union. The IJA 1st Tank Corps consisting of the 3rd and 4th Tank Regiments (Yasuoka Detachment) had been assigned to the Nomonhan region, under the command of Lt. General Yasuoka Masaomi. Of the two regiments, only the 3rd Tank Regiment had been supplemented with four of the new Type 97 medium tanks. One was selected as the regimental commander's tank.

During fierce fighting against the Red Army, the 3rd Tank Regiment was assaulting an objective ringed with strung coiled wire (piano wire). The regimental commander, Lt Col. Yoshimaru Kiyotake's Type 97 tank became entangled up to its drive sprockets. Struggling to extract itself from the tank trap, Yoshimaru managed to move his tank rearward about 40 metres, when his machine stopped completely. Exposed to Soviet defensive positions, Yoshimaru's Type 97 was subjected to the fire of a dozen Soviet BT-7 tanks and anti-tank guns. Soviet shells struck the tank's drive gear, hull, and the engine area, causing the vehicle to erupt into flames. When the fire reached the tank ammunition, the tank exploded, tearing off the turret and throwing it several feet away from the hull. Only the tank's gunner, who abandoned it, prior to the explosion, was uninjured. Yoshimaru's body was recovered after the battle.

=== World War II ===
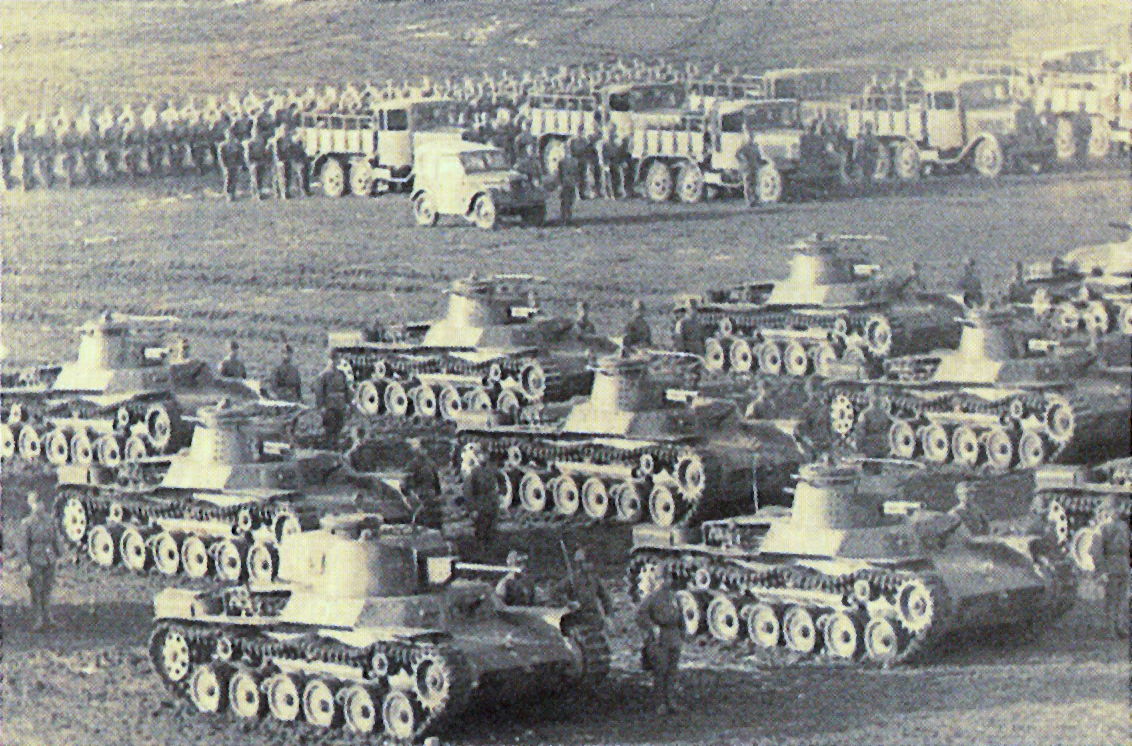
Type 97 Chi-ha and Shinhōtō Chi-ha tanks from Japanese 11th Tank Regiment, Shumshu Island

From 8 December 1941 and into early 1942, during the Battle of Malaya and the Battle of Singapore, Type 97 tanks were used by the 3rd Tank Group's 1st, 6th, and 14th Tank Regiments under the command of Lieutenant-General Yamashita. The 1st Tank Regiment was attached to the IJA 5th Division, which was among the first Japanese military units to land at Songkhla in southern Thailand. One of its medium-tank companies was the 3rd Tank Company under First Lieutenant Yamane's command (comprising ten Type 97 medium tanks and two Type 95 Ha-Go light tanks), forming part of the "Saeki Detachment". The company was in the vanguard of the attack on northern British Malaya at the end of 1941. Later on, this same unit would be involved in forcing the defending British forces to abandon much of northern Malaya in the decisive Battle of Jitra at the start of 1942.

One key to the overall Japanese military successes in Malaya and Singapore was the unexpected appearance of their tanks in areas where the British did not believe tanks could be fielded. The thick and wet jungle terrain did not turn out to be a decisive obstacle for the generally light Japanese tanks.

Later on, the 2nd and 14th Tank Regiments participated in the Burma Campaign from 1942. The 1st Independent Tank Company that took part in the Guadalcanal campaign in 1942, sustained heavy losses in the battle for Henderson Field. Its nine Type 97 Chi-Ha tanks led the attack at the Matanikau River. Marine 37 mm (1.46 in) anti-tank guns and artillery destroyed the tanks.

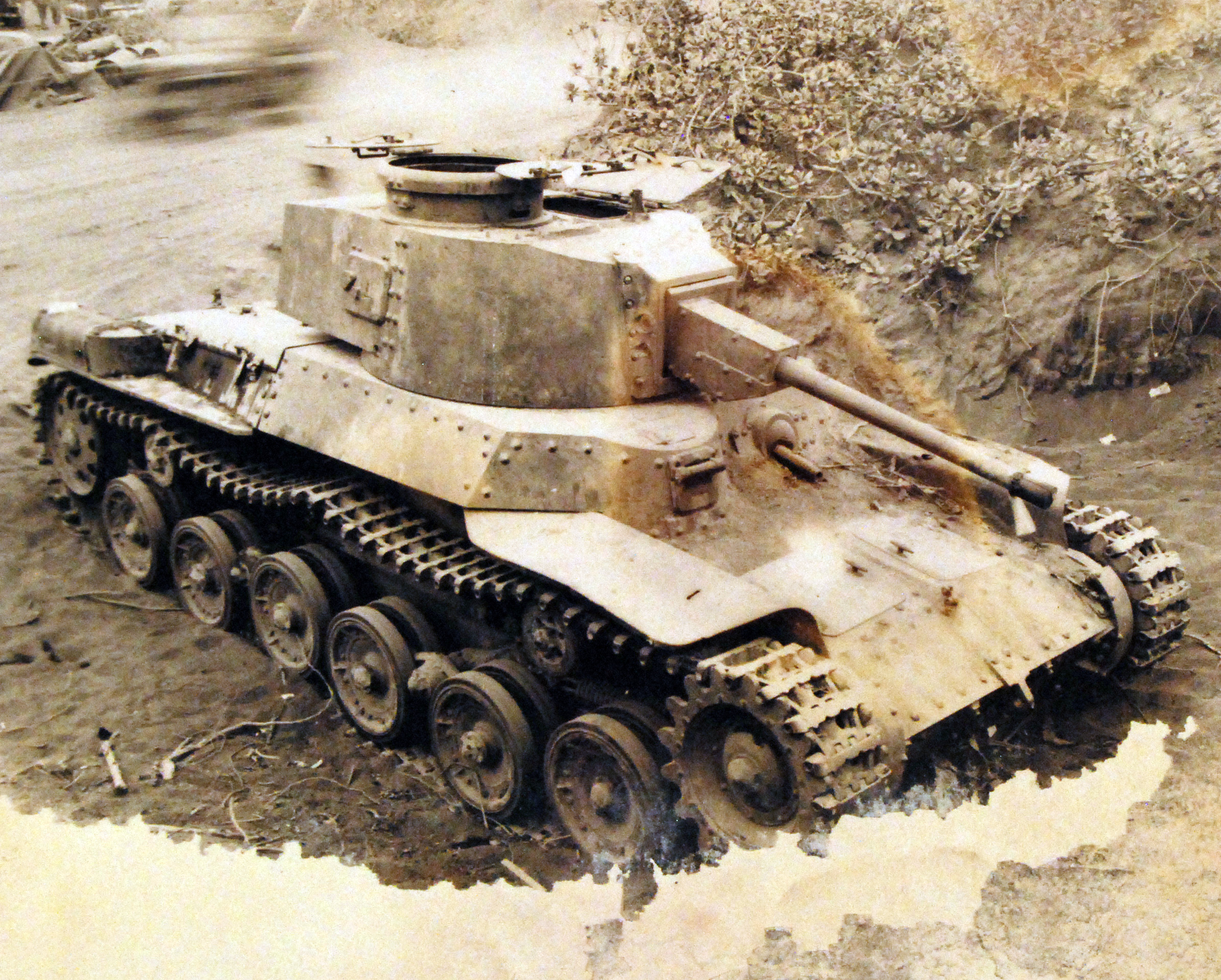
Damaged Type 97 Shinhōtō Chi-Ha, Battle of Iwo Jima

The Type 97 Shinhōtō Chi-Ha tanks were first used in combat in the battle of Corregidor in 1942. The updated 47 mm gun was easily capable of dealing with the armor of the American M3 Stuart light tanks, although in later combat service it was shown only to be effective against the sides and rear of the M4 Sherman medium tank.

During the Battle of Saipan on the night of 16–17 June, Type 97s of the 9th Tank Regiment, joined with Type 95s of the 136th Infantry Regiment in an all-out counterattack against the established beachhead by American Marines that had landed the day before. Led by the 44 tanks from the 9th, the Type 97s and Type 95s were knocked out by a Marine platoon of M4A2 tanks, several M3 75mm half-tracks, bazookas and 37mm antitank guns. It was the largest Japanese armor attack of the Pacific Theater of Operations. However, the Japanese Army seldom made major armored attacks during the Pacific War due to the limited maneuvering areas that prevailed on islands in the South Pacific Ocean. Terrain dictated the battle and IJA tanks were emplaced in hull defilade positions or even buried up to their turrets.

During the Battle of Guam, 29 Type 97 and Type 95 tanks of the IJA 9th Tank Regiment and nine Type 95s of the 24th Tank Company were lost to bazooka fire or M4 tanks. At the Battle of Okinawa, 13 Type 95s and 14 Type 97 Shinhōtō Chi-Ha tanks of the understrength IJA 27th Tank Regiment faced 800 American tanks of eight US Army and two USMC tank battalions. The Japanese tanks were defeated in their counter-attacks of 4–5 May 1945. Similar conditions were repeated in the Kwantung Army's defense against the Soviet invasion of Manchuria, although there was little tank-versus-tank action. The Soviet Red Army captured 389 tanks.

=== After World War II ===
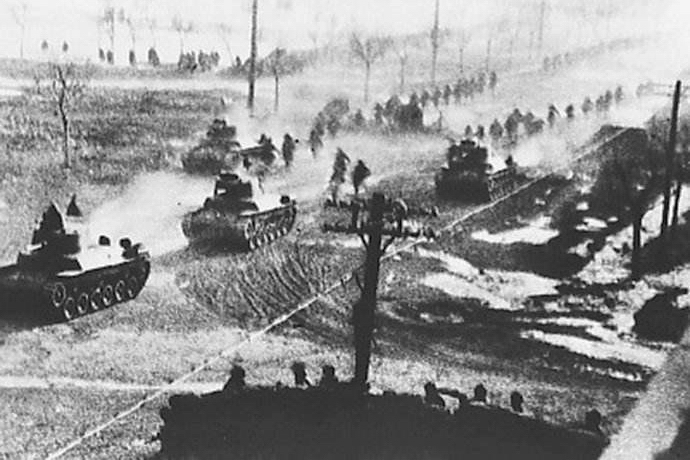
Type 97 medium tanks used by the Chinese Communist People's Liberation Army moving into the Chinese city of Shenyang during the Liaoshen campaign in 1948

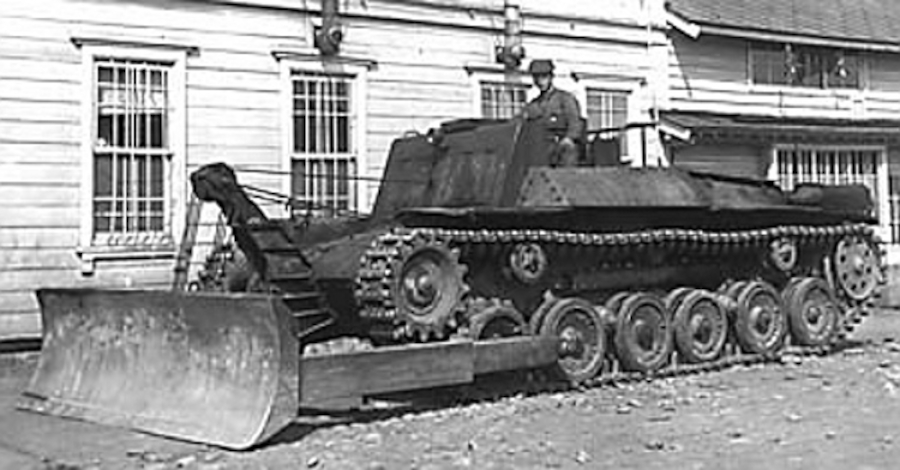
Demilitarized Type 97 tank with dozer blade

Some Japanese tanks remained in use, under new ownership, post-war during the Chinese Civil War. Type 97 tanks captured during the Soviet invasion of Manchuria were turned over to the Chinese Communist army. After victory in the civil war, the Chinese People's Liberation Army (PLA) continued to use them in their inventory. The PLA's force of 349 tanks in 1949 consisted mainly of Japanese Type 95 Ha-Go, Type 97 Chi-Ha and Shinhōtō Chi-Ha tanks. In Japan, a number of Type 97 tanks were demilitarized and used post-war for reconstruction.

== Operators ==
Empire of Japan

- Imperial Japanese Army
- Imperial Japanese Navy
  - Special Naval Landing Forces

Republic of China

- Republic of China Army (captured from Japanese forces in World War II)

China

- People's Liberation Army (captured during the Soviet invasion of Manchuria and turned over for use and captured from ROC forces in civil war)

== Survivors ==
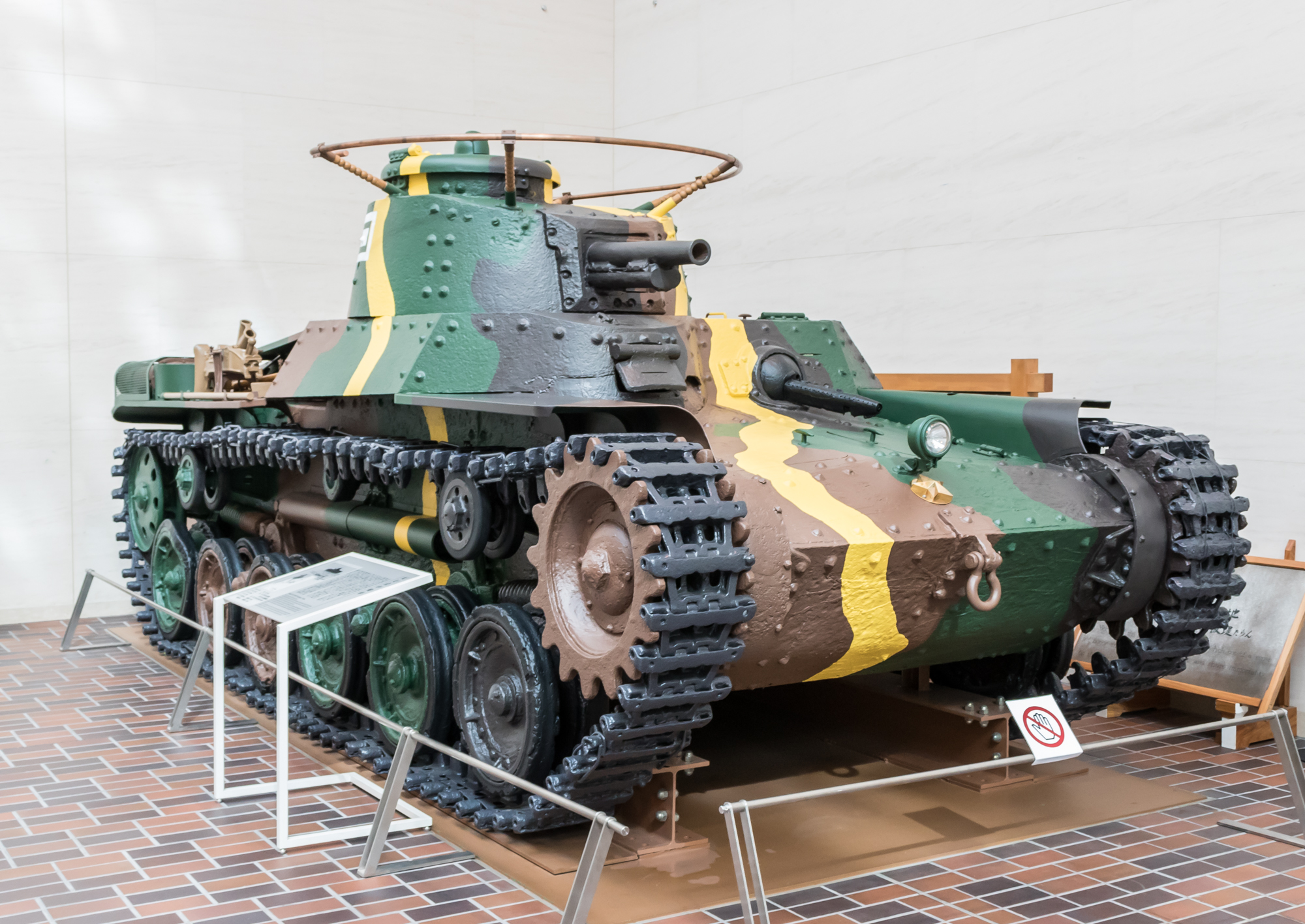
Restored Type 97 Chi-Ha medium tank at the Yūshūkan Museum, Japan

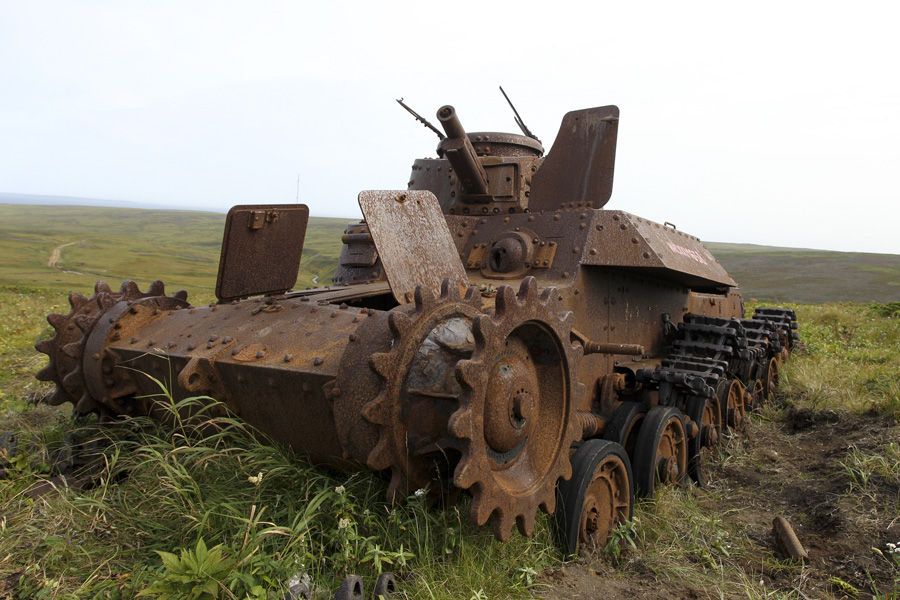
Rusting Chi-Ha on Shumshu island

Restored examples of the Type 97 are on display at the Yūshūkan Museum at the Yasukuni Shrine in Tokyo, and the Wakajishi Shrine in Fujinomiya, Shizuoka in Japan. In Indonesia there is a Type-97 at the Brawijaya Museum in Malang. The wreck of a Type 97 was found buried in the sand on the beach at Miura, Kanagawa in 2005. Preserved examples are at the People's Liberation Army Museum in Beijing, China and at the United States Army Ordnance Museum, Aberdeen, Maryland. Numerous ruined examples of Type 97 tanks can be found on Saipan and on the Kuril Islands.

== See also ==
- Japanese tanks of World War II
- List of engines and weapons used on Japanese tanks during World War II
- List of Japanese armoured fighting vehicles of World War II
