= Type 97 heavy tank machine gun =

Type 97 7.7 mm tank machine gun
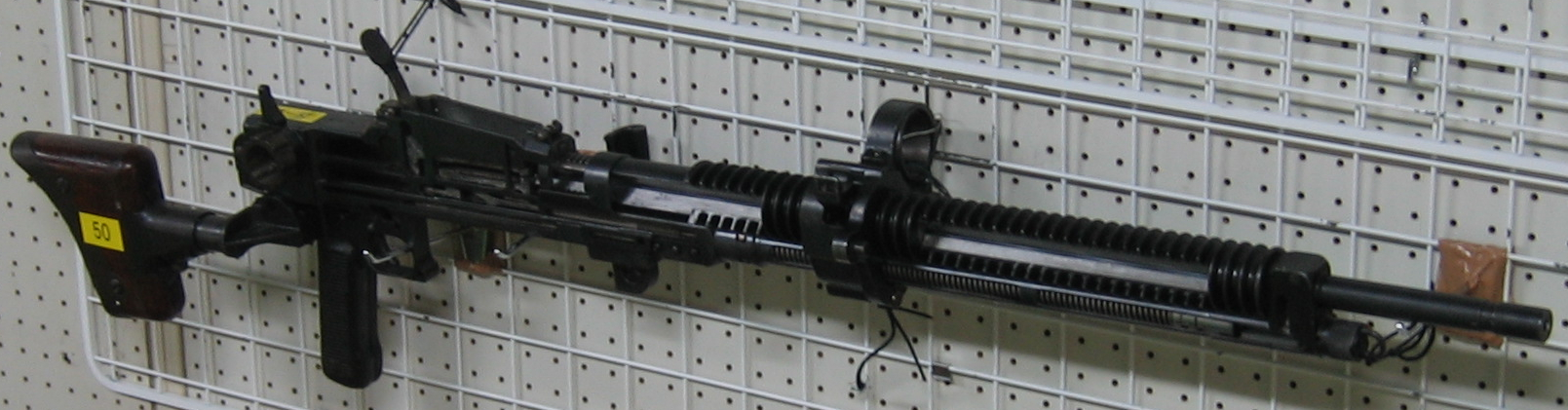
- Type 97 tank machine gun
- Type: General purpose Medium machine gun
- Place of origin: Empire of Japan

Service history
- In service: 1937–1945
- Used by: Imperial Japanese Army
- Wars: Second Sino-Japanese War; Soviet-Japanese Border Wars; World War II; Chinese Civil War; Korean War

Production history
- Designed: 1937
- Produced: 1937–1945
- No. built: 18,000

Specifications
- Mass: 12.4 kg (27 lb 5 oz)
- Length: 1,145 mm (45.1 in)
- Barrel length: 700 mm (28 in)
- Cartridge: 7.7×58mm Arisaka
- Action: Gas-operated
- Rate of fire: 500 rounds/min
- Muzzle velocity: 724 m/s (2,375 ft/s)
- Effective firing range: 540 m (590 yd)
- Maximum firing range: 3.42 km (2.13 mi)
- Feed system: 20-round detachable box magazine
- Sights: Blade front sight and aperture rear sight

The Type 97 heavy tank machine gun (九七式車載重機関銃, Kyū-nana-shiki shasai jū-kikanjū) was the standard machine gun used in tanks and armored vehicles of the Imperial Japanese Army during World War II, and as a general purpose medium machine gun by infantry forces. This weapon was not related to the Type 97 aircraft machine gun used in several Japanese Navy aircraft including the Mitsubishi A6M Zero, or the Type 97 automatic cannon used as an anti-tank rifle. The Type 97 Tank machine gun is the only mag-fed general purpose/medium machine gun that exists.

== Development ==
Initially, the Type 11 light machine gun was modified by the Army Technical Bureau for use in tanks and other armored vehicles, and was produced for this application under the designation "Type 91 mobile machine gun". The basic design issues with the Type 11 remained, including its tendency to jam because of the slightest amount of grit or dirt, and the low lethality and lack of stopping power of its 6.5x50mm Arisaka cartridges.

During the early stages of the Second Sino-Japanese War, Japanese forces captured a number of Czechoslovak ZB vz. 26 light machine guns from China’s National Revolutionary Army; its numerous design advantages led to the development of the Type 97. This was used in a modified form for armored vehicles until 1940, when the Japanese Army switched to a rimless 7.7 mm cartridge.

== Design ==
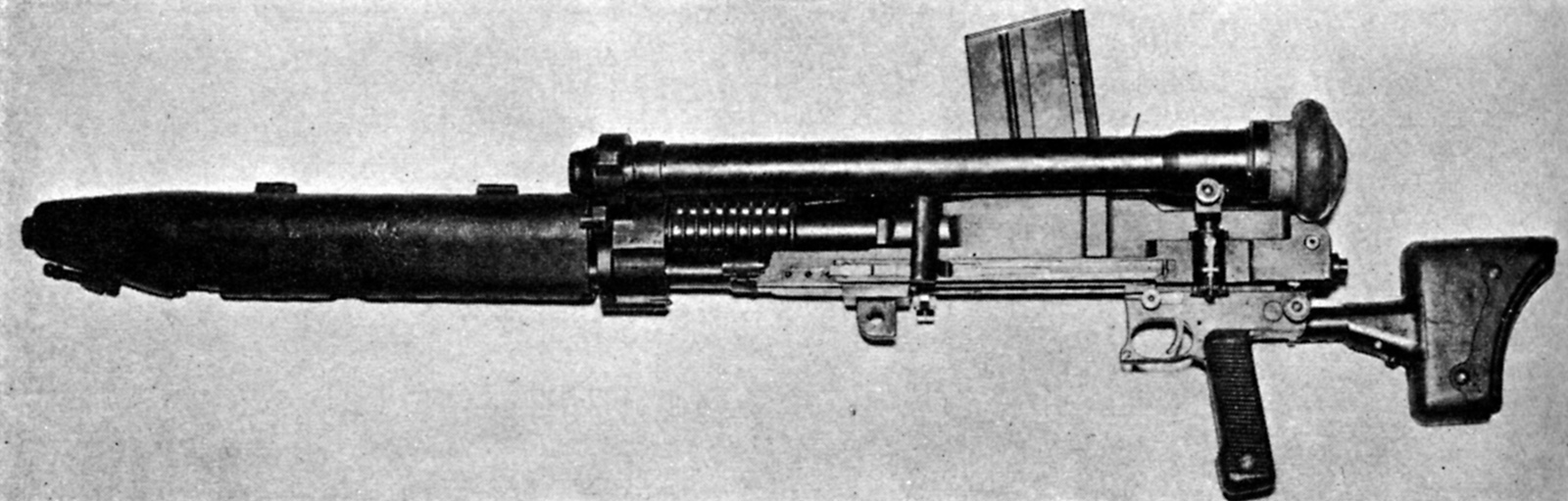
A Type 97 tank machine gun, shown with telescopic sight, magazine and jacket guard

The Type 97 was mechanically similar to the Czechoslovak ZB vz. 26, with a different stock and pistol grip. It had a straight, vertical, 20-round box magazine and used the same 7.7mm cartridges used in the Type 99 rifle. As with all air-cooled automatic weapons, the gun barrel could easily overheat, which meant the gunner had to fire in bursts, or the barrel would be shot out.

When fitted in a tank, a fixed focus 1.5x telescopic sight with a 30° field of view was used. To prevent injury to the gunner, a rubber eye pad was attached to the rear of the sight.

When used as an infantry weapon, a bipod was employed. Without the bipod, it weighed 11.25 kg (24.8 lb).

== Deployment ==
The Type 97 came into service in 1937, and it was used on all Japanese tanks and other armored vehicles until the end of the war. The Imperial Japanese Navy also used the weapon in their combat vehicles, such as the Type 92 Jyu-Sokosha heavy armored car (tankette).

It was much less common as a stand-alone infantry gun due to its weight. As a result of this weight problem, the similar looking but different internally Type 99 light machine gun was developed in the same caliber and deployed instead.

It was used by communist forces during the Korean War.

== See also ==
- Bren light machine gun
- Type 96 light machine gun
