= List of tanks and armoured vehicles of the Imperial Japanese Navy =

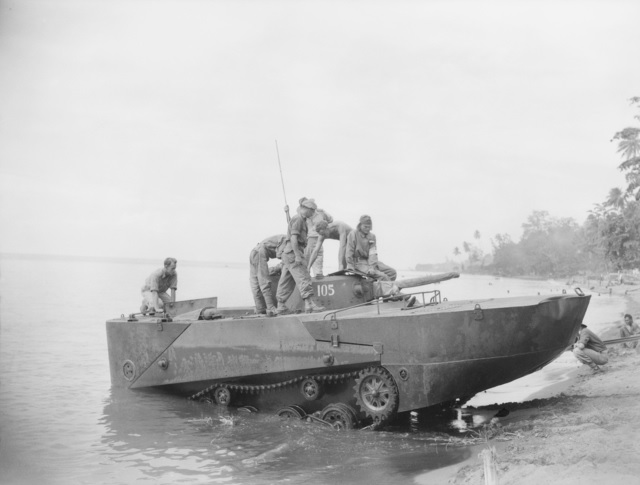
Japanese Type 2 Ka-Mi amphibious tank being tested by Australian soldiers, 1945

This is a list of tanks and armoured vehicles of the Imperial Japanese Navy (World War II).

== Tankettes, light and medium tanks ==
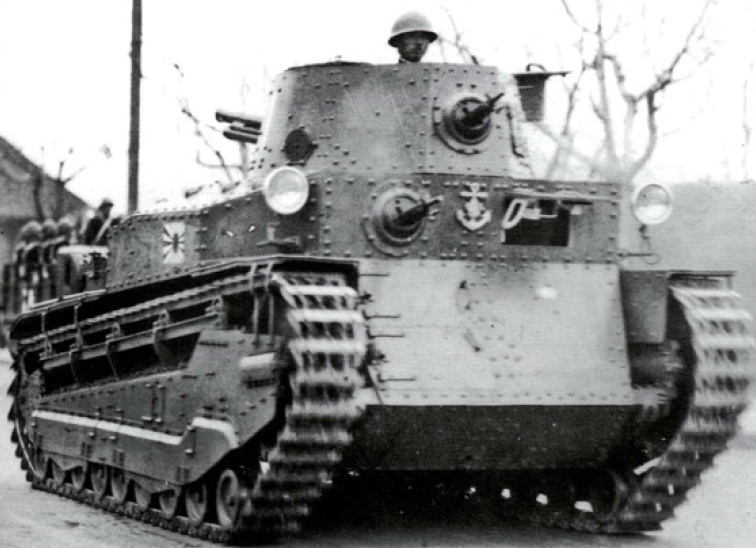
Type 89A I-Go tank of a SNLF unit

- Type Ka Kijusha (a/k/a Type Ka machine gun car) (Carden Loyd tankette)
- Type 92 heavy armoured car (tankette)
- Type 94 tankette
- Type 97 Te-Ke tankette
- Type 95 Ha-Go light tank
- Type 89 I-Go medium tank (Chi-Ro)
- Type 97 Chi-Ha medium tank
- Type 97 ShinHōtō Chi-Ha medium tank (Kai; improved)

== Amphibious tanks ==
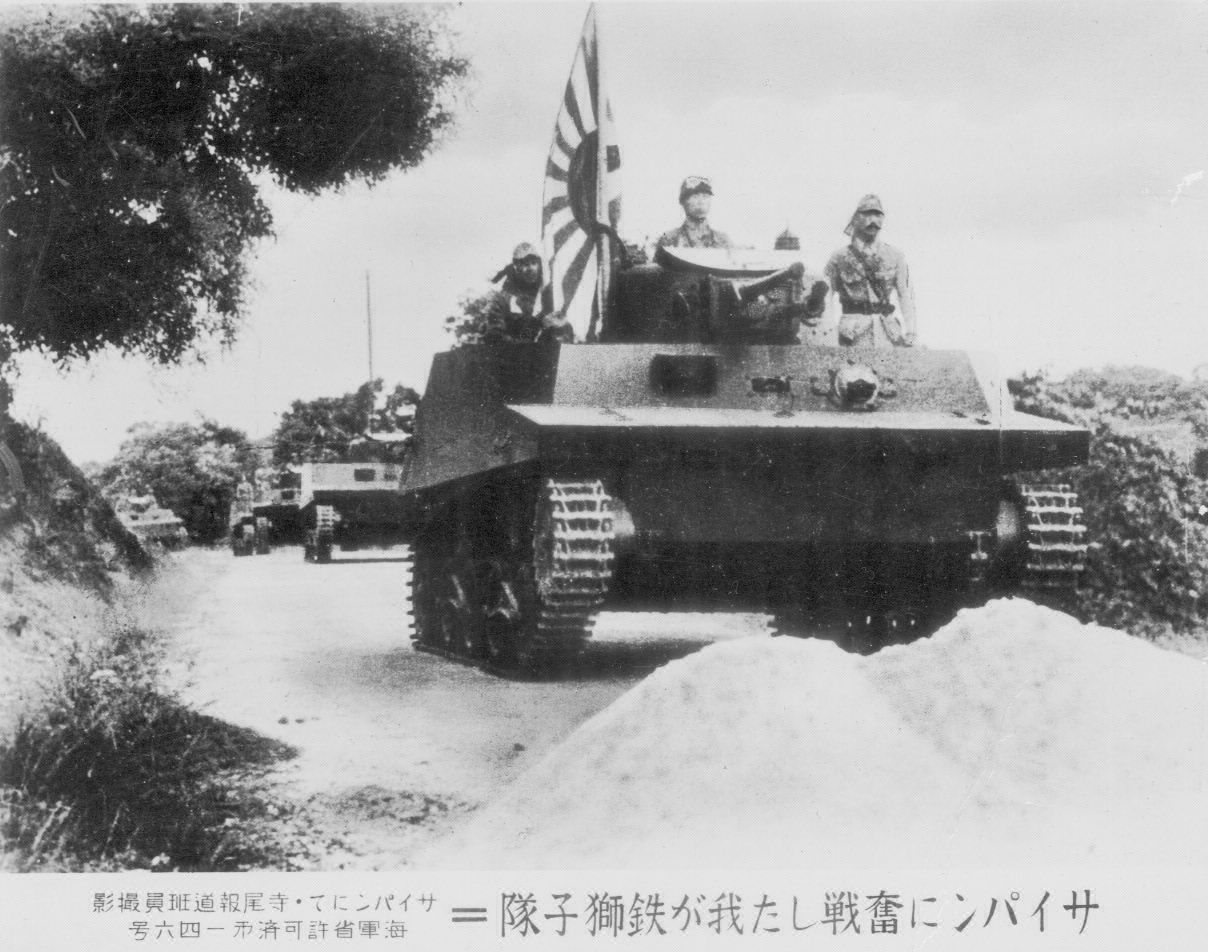
Type 2 Ka-Mi tanks on Saipan

- Type 1 Mi-Sha (a/k/a Type 1 Ka-Mi) amphibious tank (prototype)
- Type 2 Ka-Mi amphibious tank
- Type 3 Ka-Chi amphibious medium tank
- Type 5 To-Ku amphibious heavy tank (prototype)

== Amphibious APC ==
- Type 4 Ka-Tsu amphibious APC vehicle

== Self-Propelled vehicles ==
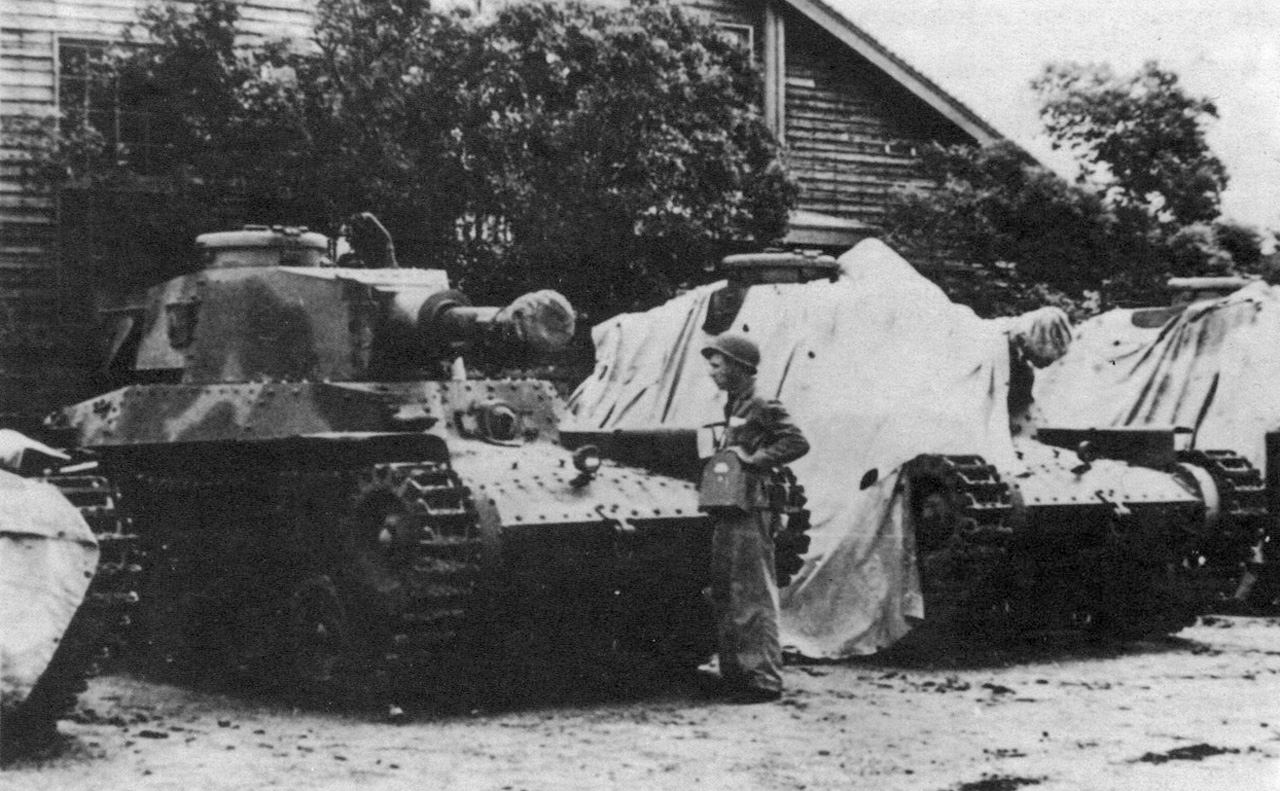
Short barrel 120 mm gun tanks at the Naval Yard in Sasebo

- Short barrel 120 mm gun tank
- Long barrel 12 cm self-propelled gun (experimental)

== Armoured cars ==
- Vickers Crossley armoured car
- Type 2592 Chiyoda armored car
- Sumida Model P armored car (variant of the Type 91 Sumida M.2593)
- Type 93 armoured car (a/k/a Type 2593 Hokoku, Type 93 Kokusanor or "Type 92" naval armored car)

== Cars and trucks ==
- Type 95 recon car mini-truck
- Amphibious truck Su-Ki

== See also ==
Imperial Japanese Navy land forces
