= Imperial Japanese Navy land forces =

Land combat forces of the Imperial Japanese Navy

- 大日本帝國海軍陸戦隊
- The Imperial Japanese Navy ensign, also utilized by IJN land forces
- Active: 1876—1945
- Country: Empire of Japan
- Allegiance: Emperor of Japan
- Branch: Imperial Japanese Navy
- Type: Shore-based naval personnel
- Role: Amphibious operations; Expeditionary warfare; Airborne operations (select SNLF units); Jungle warfare; Military policing (Tokkeitai units); Defensive operations; Installation security; Anti-aircraft defence; Naval education and training
- Engagements: Second Sino-Japanese War; World War II

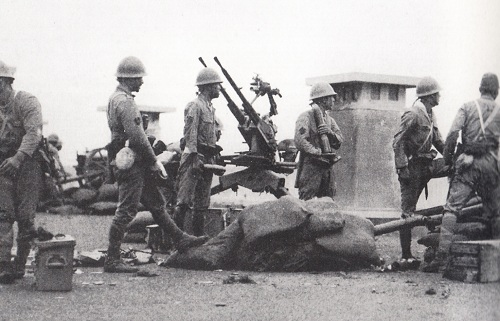
Japanese naval infantry operating a Type 93 13 mm anti-aircraft machine gun

The Imperial Japanese Navy land forces (大日本帝國海軍陸戦隊, Dai-Nippon Teikoku Kaigun Rikusentai) were a variety of land-based units of the Imperial Japanese Navy (IJN) organized for offensive operations, the defense of Japanese naval and shore-based facilities, military policing tasks, construction and engineering, training, and shore-based anti-aircraft roles; both overseas, and in the Japanese home islands. Units ranged from dedicated military police formations, to ad-hoc groups of naval personnel pressed into service as naval infantry, to professional marines, among others. The land forces were most active during the interwar period and World War II, with IJN land forces complementing, supporting, and in some cases, operating in-place of Imperial Japanese Army units. Upon Imperial Japan’s surrender, IJN land forces were disbanded alongside the IJN proper in 1945.

== Units ==
The Imperial Japanese Navy’s land forces consisted of the following units:

- Naval Landing Force or 海軍陸戦隊 Kaigun-rikusen-tai; also referred to as naval shore parties. These were ad hoc units formed from ship's crews for temporary use ashore as naval infantry.
- Special Naval Landing Forces (SNLF) or 海軍特別陸戦隊 Kaigun-tokubetsu-rikusen-tai: the Imperial Japanese Navy's professional marines. Units were typically battalion-sized and formed at the naval corps-level for both offensive and defensive operations. There was also three Special Naval Landing Forces paratroop units (although only two would participate in operational airborne jumps), which were composed of SNLF marines who received jump training from the Imperial Japanese Army at Kantō Plain. The SNLF were entirely under the control of the Imperial Japanese Navy as opposed to an independent or quasi-independent military branch such as the United States Marine Corps or the United Kingdom's Royal Marines, respectively, and should not be confused with the Imperial Japanese Marine Corps which briefly existed between 1871 and 1876.
  - Shanghai Special Naval Landing Force or 上海海軍特別陸戦隊 Shanghai-kaigun-tokubetsu-rikusen-tai: the sole permanent Special Naval Landing Force, established in Shanghai following the January 28th Incident in 1932. The unit had an authorized strength of approximately 2000 men and was organized into a brigade made up of several battalions and smaller special weapons units.
  - Combined Special Naval Landing Force or 連合特別陸戦隊 Rengō-tokubetsu-rikusen-tai: a headquarters unit which combined several Special Naval Landing Force units into a brigade sized unit with greater firepower.
- Base Force or 根拠地隊 Konkyochi-tai and the Special Base Force or 特別根拠地隊 Tokubetsu-konkyochi-tai provided a variety of services both administrative and tactical in areas outside Japan proper, Korea, and Formosa. The Japanese raised around fifty of these units which ranged in size from 250 to 1500 men depending on location and function. The Base Force could also include afloat units.
- Defense Units or 防備隊 Bōbi-tai: units of from 250 to 2000 men organized for defense of naval installations and areas of strategic importance within Japan. Some Defense Units included artillery emplacements and some controlled the minefields in Japanese waters.

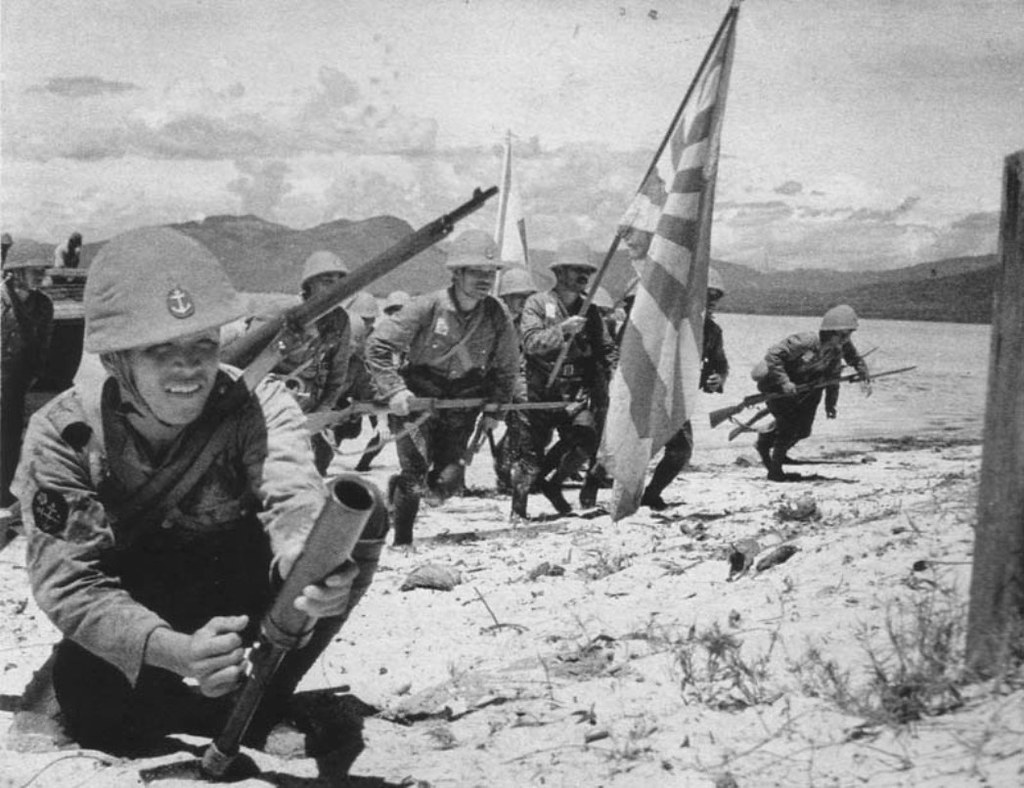
The 81st Guard Unit conducting a landing drill in Cam Ranh Bay, 1941

- Guard Units or 警備隊 Keibi-tai: 100 to 1500 men units responsible for ground defense of Imperial Japanese Navy facilities. They were frequently assigned to Base Forces and Special Base Forces. The Japanese raised around one hundred of these units. Many of these units played a notable part in the defense of Japanese held islands during the later stages of the war, such as the Iwo Jima Keibi-tai consisting of 1000 men led by Captain Samaji Inouye.
- Anti-Aircraft Defense Units or 防空隊 Bōkū-tai: Anti-aircraft artillery units of 200–350 men. There were three types which differed based on the number and kind of anti-aircraft weapons assigned. Type A includes AA artillery and machine guns, Type B machine guns only, and Type C machine guns and machine-cannon. The Japanese formed over two hundred of these units which were primarily located in areas outside Japan, Formosa, and Korea. They were usually assigned to Base Forces, Special Base Forces, Special Naval Landing Forces, and Guard Forces.
- Construction Battalions or 設営隊 Setsuei-tai built and repaired naval facilities of all kinds, including airstrips, barracks, ammunition bunkers, and fuel depots on remote islands as well as Japan's major naval bases. Most personnel were civilian employees and unarmed. The units also included naval engineers overseeing the operations and sailors guarding the unit, both being lightly armed for defense. The Construction Battalions often made use of local labor whose service was compulsory.
- Communications Units or 通信隊 Tsūshin-tai of 100–2,000 men were stationed ashore to provide communications between Japan's widespread naval installations and to and from the fleets and ships at sea.
- Tokkeitai or 特警隊 Navy military police units carried out ordinary military police functions in naval installations and occupied territories; they also worked with the Imperial Japanese Army's Kempeitai military police, the Keishi-chō civil police and Tokkō secret units on matters concerning security, intelligence collection, and counter-intelligence.
- Anti-Aircraft Artillery Batteries or 高射砲中隊 Koshaho Chutai were units of forty or fifty men organized for the air defense of important installations and were subordinate to Air Defense Sectors which in turn were subordinate to Defense Units. These batteries were separate from the previously mentioned Bobitai. Several hundred of them were in existence at the end of the war.
- Naval Corps or 海兵団 Kaiheidan were units in each of the four naval districts (Yokosuka, Kure, Sasebo and Maizuru) that were responsible for training of enlisted and non-commissioned officer personnel for the navy.

== Armored units ==
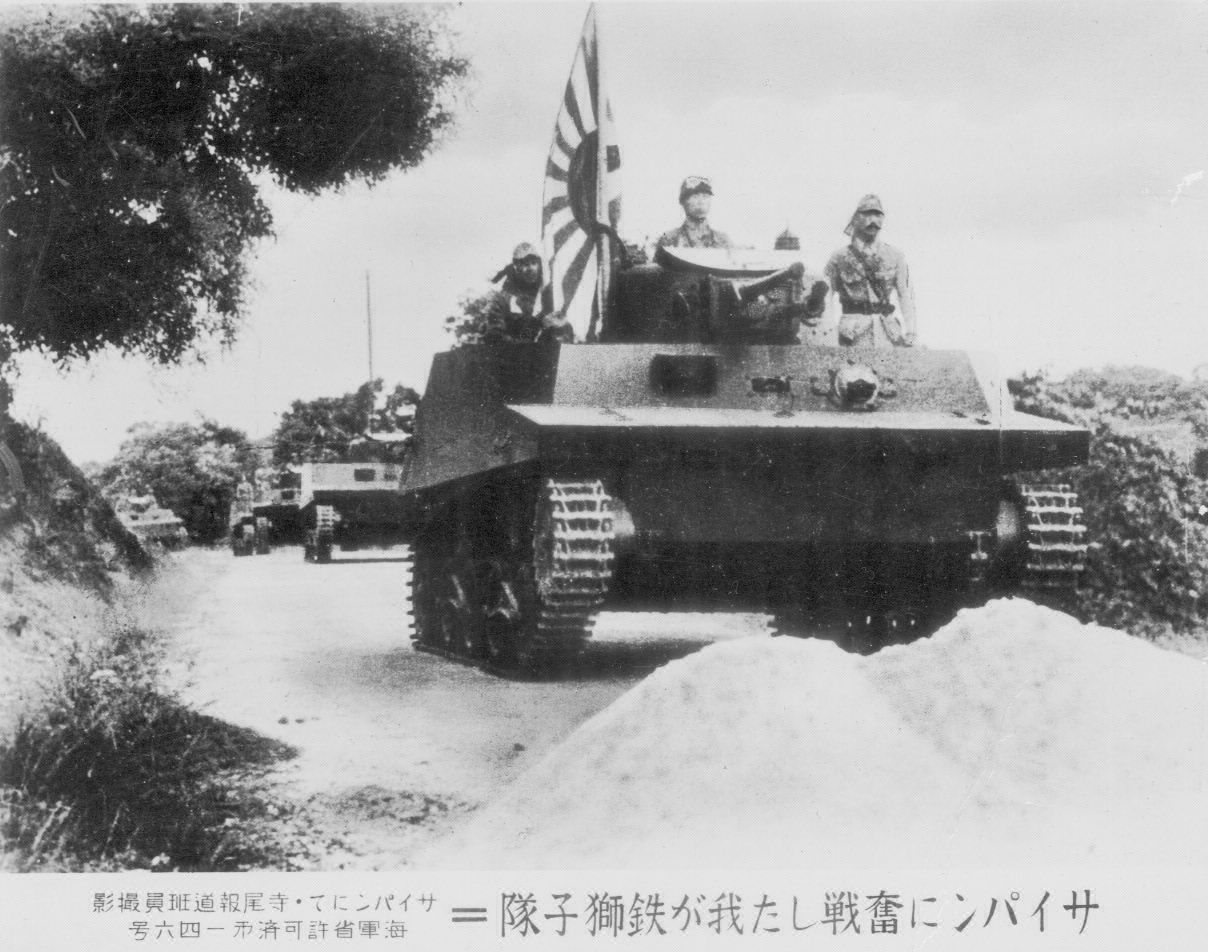
Yokosuka 1st SNLF Type 2 Ka-Mi tanks on Saipan

The IJN additionally operated armored units — typically subordinated to an SNLF unit — that were equipped with armoured cars, tankettes and tanks, including at various times:

- Vickers Crossley armoured car
- Sumida Model P armored car
- Type 93 armoured car
- Type 94 tankette
- Type 97 Te-Ke tankette
- Type 95 Ha-Go light tank
- Type 89 I-Go medium tank
- Type 97 Chi-Ha medium tank
- Type 97 ShinHōtō Chi-Ha medium tank (improved)
- Type 2 Ka-Mi amphibious tank

Known armored units include:

- Shanghai SNLF Tank Company (served during Shanghai Incident period)
- Tank Platoon of Kure 5th SNLF (served in Milne Bay)
- Tank Unit of Sasebo 7th SNLF (served in Betio, Tarawa) its commander: Ensign Ohtani
- Kwajalein Armor Unit of Sasebo 7th SNLF-(served in Kwajalein Atoll)
- Navy tank unit of 55th Guard Unit, Yokosuka 1st SNLF (served in Saipan, Marianas)
- Itoh Armored Detachment SNLF (served in Leyte, Philippines) commander: Commander Itoh
- Makin Armor SNLF Detachment of Navy 3rd Special Base Force (served in Makin)

IJN SNLF tank units were distinguished by IJN anchor symbol, as opposed to the Imperial Japanese Army star.

== See also ==
- Coastal Troops of the Russian Navy
- Amphibious Rapid Deployment Brigade
- Amphibious Brigades (Imperial Japanese Army)
- Special Boarding Unit
- Maritime Inspection Team
