= Special Naval Landing Forces =

Marines of the Imperial Japanese Navy

- 海軍特別陸戦隊
- The ensign of the Special Naval Landing Force
- Active: 1932–1945
- Country: Empire of Japan
- Allegiance: Emperor of Japan
- Branch: Imperial Japanese Navy
- Type: Naval infantry
- Part of: Imperial Japanese Navy land forces
- Engagements: Second Sino-Japanese War; World War II

The Special Naval Landing Forces (SNLF; Japanese: 海軍特別陸戦隊, romanized: Kaigun Tokubetsu Rikusentai) were naval infantry units in the Imperial Japanese Navy (IJN), and were a part of the IJN land forces. They saw extensive service in the Second Sino-Japanese War and in the Pacific theatre of World War II. While not existing as a dedicated naval infantry branch of the IJN, they functioned as the infantry of the Navy, and engaged in many coastal or amphibious operations, leading to them being referred to as "Imperial marines" or simply "Japanese marines" in the West.

The IJN's marine paratroopers were designated as SNLF units, though they were operationally subordinated to the Imperial Japanese Navy Air Service. IJN armored units were generally subordinated to SNLF units and fielded a variety of light tanks, medium tanks and armored cars.

The SNLF are distinct from the Naval Landing Forces, which were primarily ad-hoc units of naval personnel formed into naval infantry units whom rarely performed proper amphibious operations and were primarily utilized in a defensive role ashore, particularly post-1942, though the SNLF were also employed in increasingly defensive roles as World War II came to a close.

== History ==
Since the late Meiji Era, the IJN had naval landing forces or rikusentai formed from individual ships's crews, who received infantry training as part of their basic training, for special and/or temporary missions. In addition, troops from Naval Bases known as Kaiheidan could form a naval landing force.

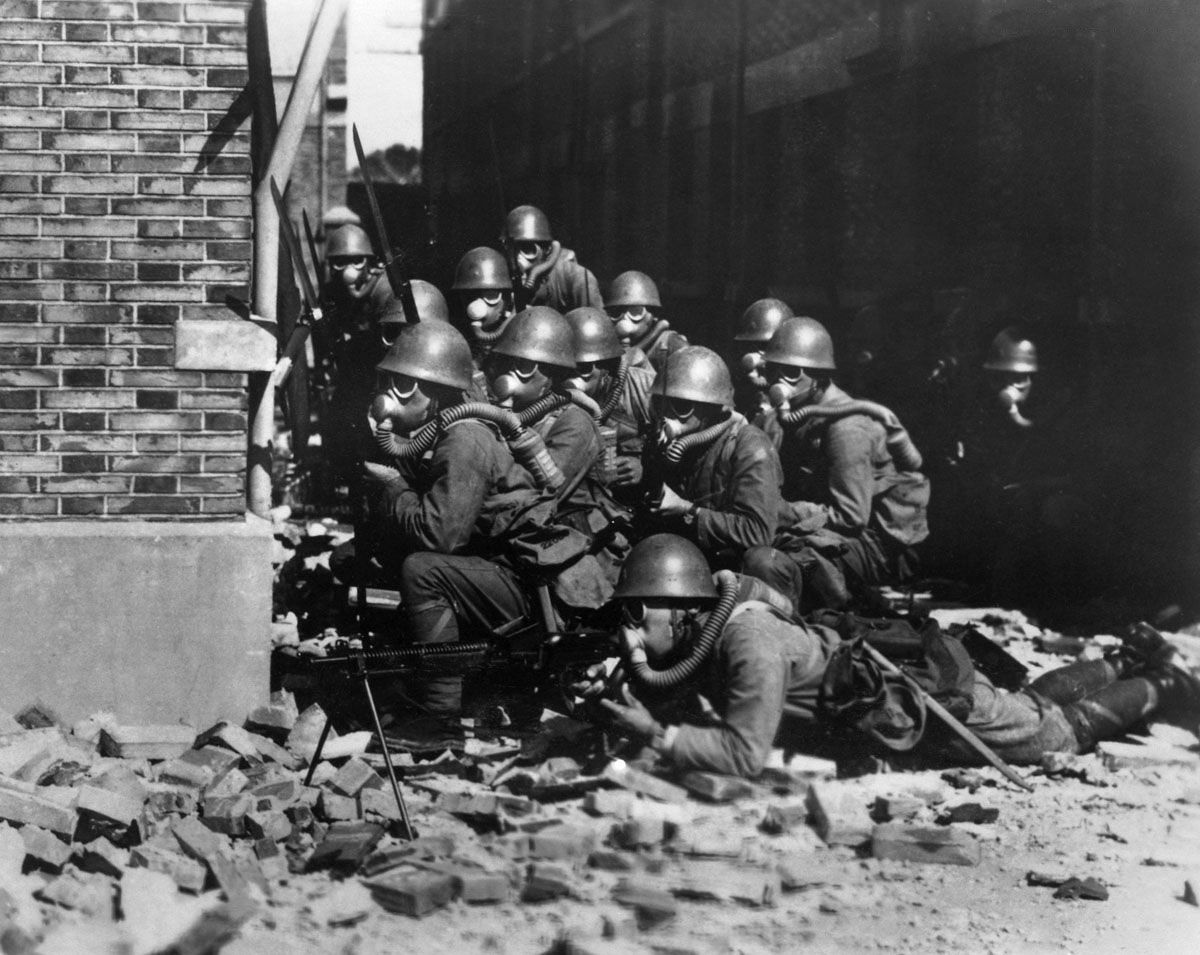
IJN Special Naval Landing Forces armed with the Type 11 during the Battle of Shanghai

Starting in the Meiji Era the navy began to raise units unofficially known as Special Naval Landing Forces. These forces were raised from kaiheidan at — and took their names from — the four main naval districts/bases in Japan: Kure, Maizuru (deactivated following the Washington naval treaty, reactivated in 1939), Sasebo, and Yokosuka. In 1927 some of these SNLF units were unified under command of the Shanghai Naval Landing Force and saw action in China from 1932 in the January 28 Incident. Afterwards the Shanghai Special Naval Landing Force was officially formed in October 1932, signifying the first official SNLF unit. Official SNLF units from naval bases were authorized in 1936. SNLF units would once again see action at the Battle of Shanghai and countless other battles and cleanup operations throughout the Second Sino-Japanese War.

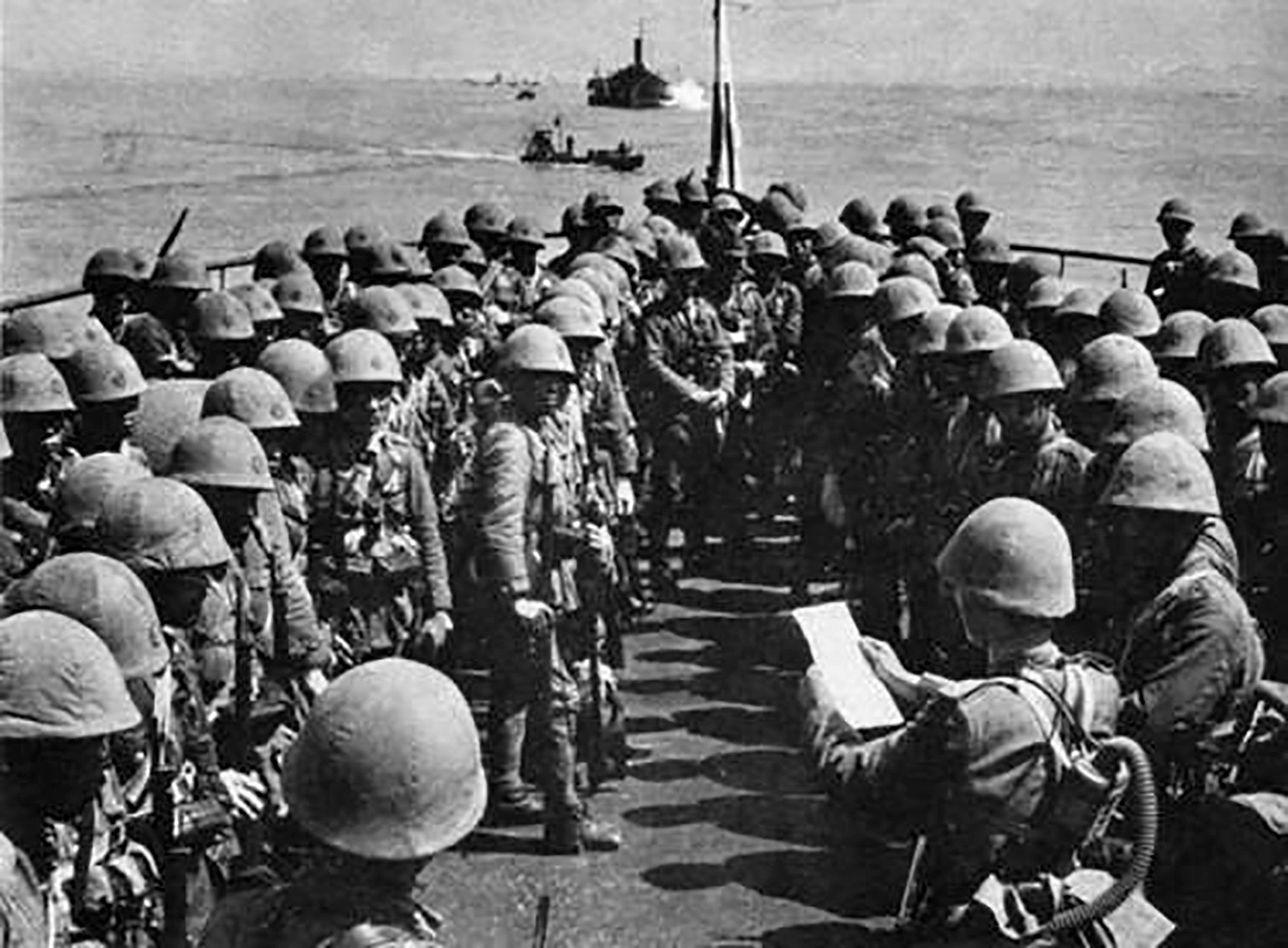
Personnel of the Maizuru 1st SNLF prepare for the Hainan Island Operation which included the invasion of Hainan, 1939

The strengths of each SNLF ranged from the 200 to over 3000 personnel. Almost all units were a single battalion with a varying number of companies.

In 1941, the 1st and 3rd Yokosuka SNLF were converted to parachute units. The SNLF paratroopers were successfully used during the attack on Celebes and the Battle of Manado. Aside from the paratroopers, there were also planned elite units to conduct reconnaissance and raid operations.

Like all landing forces they often experienced heavy casualties when faced with determined resistance, such as at the Battle of Milne Bay. This was due to their offensive spirit and unwillingness to surrender, and when completely out of ammunition, they sometimes resorted to hand-to-hand fighting with their swords and bayonets. After the failure to capture Milne Bay the Special Naval Landing Forces became a defensive force and very few units were raised. Naval Guard Units became much more common IJN infantry units in the Pacific.

The SNLF gained the distinction of being the first foreign forces to establish a foothold on American soil since the War of 1812, when troops of the Maizuru 3rd SNLF landed on Kiska Island, Alaska without opposition on June 6, 1942 and occupied the island as part of the Aleutian Islands Campaign during World War II. After a year of occupation, with reinforcements from thousands of Imperial Japanese Army (IJA) soldiers, they completely evacuated on July 28, 1943 two weeks before Allied forces landed.

In 1943, a contingent of approximately 1,700 men of the 7th Sasebo SNLF and 2,000 base personnel (mostly the 3rd Special Base Force) at the Battle of Tarawa accounted for over 3,000 U.S. Marine Corps casualties.

== SNLF units ==
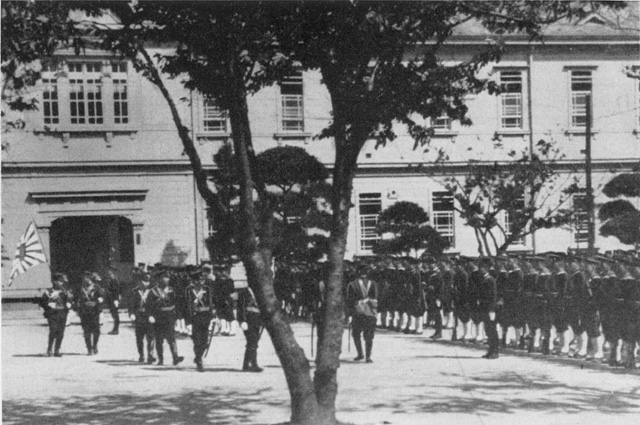
6th Kure SNLF in formation at their home barracks in Japan before deploying for the Midway operation, June 1942.

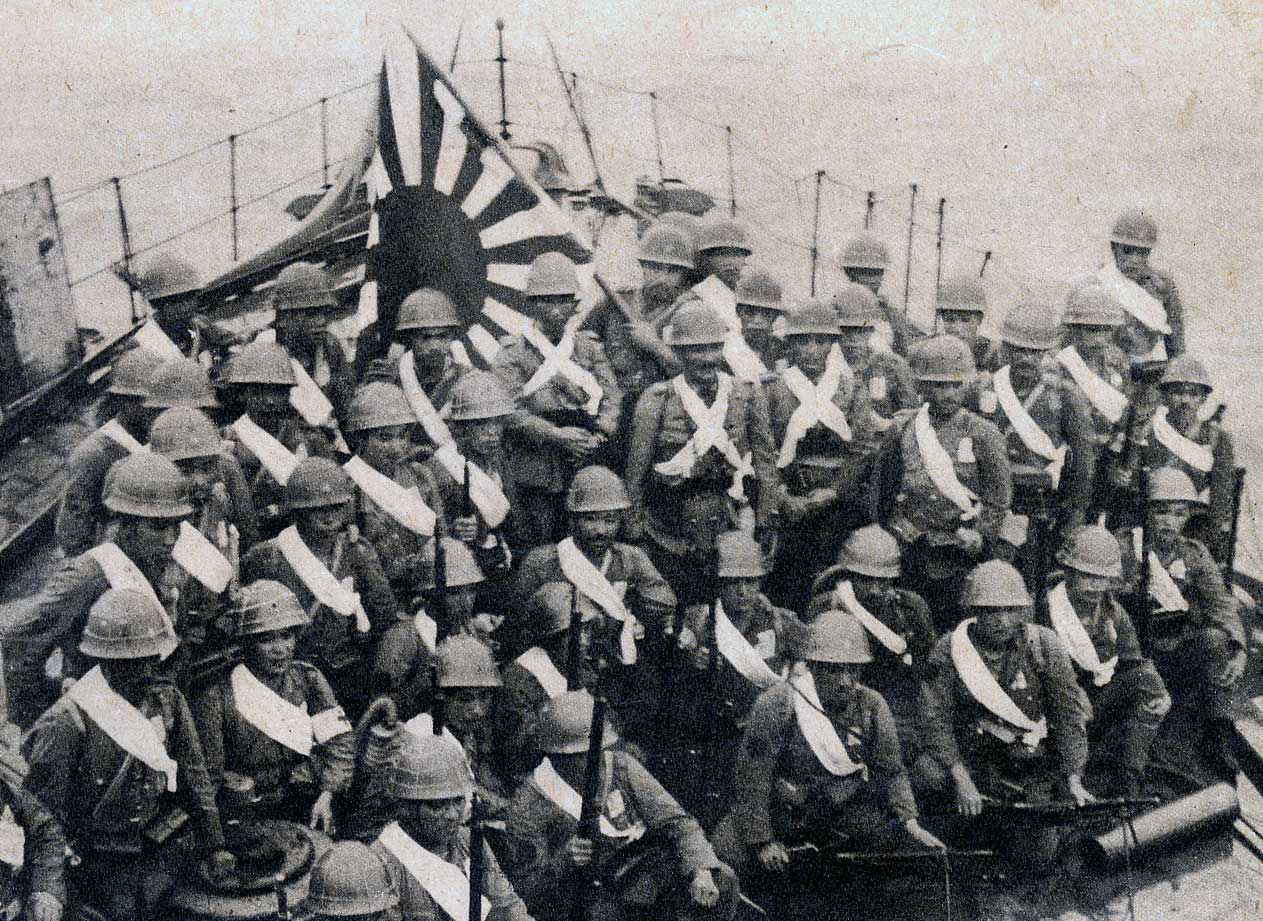
Japanese Special Naval Landing Forces, members of a White Sash Squadron, await orders on the deck board of an unidentified IJN vessel in the city of Anqing, China, June 11th, 1938.

=== Infantry units ===
- Kure Naval Base
  - 1st Kure SNLF-At Hainan Naval District, 3rd China Fleet
  - 2nd Kure SNLF
  - 3rd Kure SNLF
  - 5th Kure SNLF
  - 6th Kure SNLF
  - 7th Kure SNLF
- Maizuru Naval Base
  - 1st Maizuru SNLF
  - 2nd Maizuru SNLF
  - 3rd Maizuru SNLF (Inactivated)
  - 4th Maizuru SNLF
  - 5th Maizuru SNLF
- Sasebo Naval Base
  - 1st Sasebo SNLF
  - 2nd Sasebo SNLF-Under 32nd Special Base Force, 3rd Fleet
  - 5th Sasebo SNLF
  - 6th Sasebo SNLF
  - 7th Sasebo SNLF
  - 8th Sasebo SNLF
  - Sasebo Combined SNLF (Combined 1st and 2nd Sasebo SNLF)
- Yokosuka Naval Base
  - 1st Yokosuka SNLF (Originally an SNLF Para formation)
  - 2nd Yokosuka SNLF (Originally an SNLF Para formation)
  - 3rd Yokosuka SNLF (Originally an SNLF Para formation)
  - 4th Yokosuka SNLF
  - 5th Yokosuka SNLF
  - 6th Yokosuka SNLF
  - 7th Yokosuka SNLF

=== Non-naval base SNLFs ===
- Shanghai SNLF (~2000 men): special naval guard based in Shanghai port, China belonged in China Theater Fleet.
  - Hankou SNLF: detachment of the Shanghai SNLF. (Unofficially known as SNLF).

=== Paratroopers of the SNLF ===
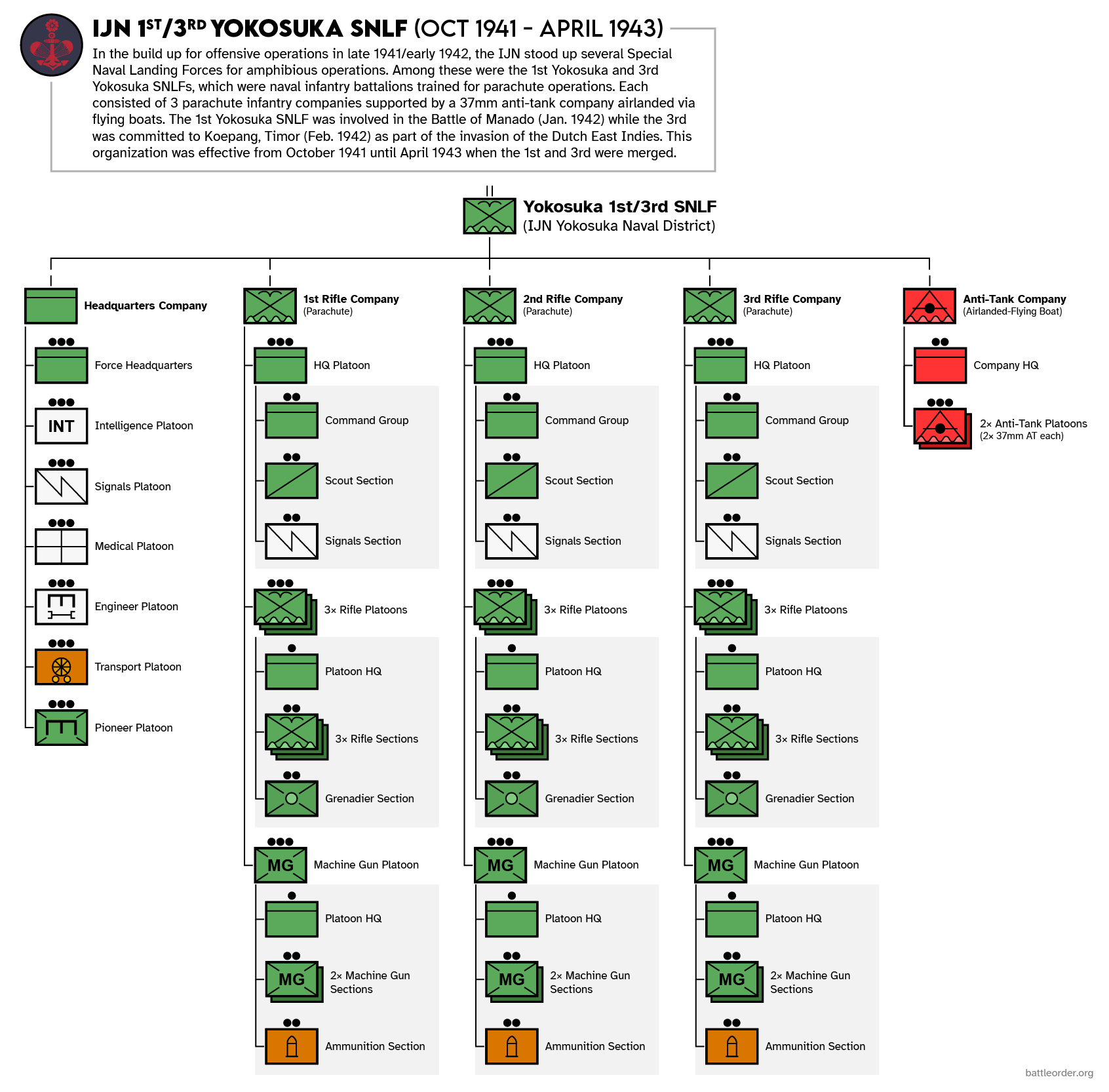
Organization of the 1st and 3rd Yokosuka SNLFs from 1941 to 1943.

- Yokosuka Naval Base
  - 1st Yokosuka SNLF (Parachute trained) the 1st was disbanded after its operations in Celebes were completed.
  - 3rd Yokosuka SNLF (Parachute trained) Made a drop on Timor. Later taken into the 1st Yokosuka SNLF.

=== Tank and armor units ===
- Shanghai SNLF Tank Company
- Milne Tank Platoon of Kure 5th SNLF
- Tarawa Tank Unit of Sasebo 7th SNLF
- Navy tank unit Yokosuka 1st SNLF
- Itoh Armored Detachment SNLF (unofficial SNLF)

=== Training ===
- Kaiheidan at the main bases of Kure, Maizuru, Sasebo and Yokosuka provided basic infantry training to all new navy recruits.
- Tateyama IJN Ordnance School provided ground and armor training for naval personnel.
- Amphibious armor school: Established in the IJN aquatic armour unit at Q-Base on Nasake-jima island in 1943 and the first trained units were sent to Rabaul (New Guinea) and the Marshall Islands in October of same year. Later units were sent to Saipan, Shimushu and Palau.

== Uniforms ==
=== Service dress ===
The uniforms of SNLF troops were greener versions of those worn by members of the Imperial Japanese Navy Land Forces. The single exception was the SNLF Paratroopers who had their own specialized uniforms.

When on board ships, the sailors of the SNLF wore their standard IJN blue or white uniforms, but on land the SNLF wore a uniform similar to that of the Imperial Japanese Army. Originally they wore their shipboard dress during ground combat as well, but in the mid 1930s it was replaced with a specialized land uniform. The land uniform consisted of a green single breasted tunic with a stand and fall collar with three buttons which ran down the front, which is often referred to as Rikusenfuku (陸戦服). These uniforms were also worn by regular Naval troops deployed on land. The SNLF usually wore this uniform with the collar open over the IJN's white trimmed teeshirt, or a heat resistant khaki button-up shirt later in the war. Towards the end of the war, the three-button uniform was replaced by a similar four-button green uniform known as the Class III (三種), which was intended to be the standard combat dress for all members of the Imperial Japanese Navy. In the final stages of the war, what was left of the SNLF could be seen wearing the previously mentioned uniforms, a green five button work uniform, or even a button-up undershirt and trousers. Officers wore their uniform with a shirt and tie, sometimes omitting the tie during combat or in hot weather. The tie was originally dark blue, but was later changed to green. Green long trousers or pantaloons were worn as standard along with the wool puttees or canvas gaiters for enlisted and leather gaiters for officers. All, except mounted troops (who wore breeches and high leather boots), wore this uniform with horsehide, pigskin or leather ankle-boots.

SNLF Paratroopers wore two types of green uniform made from rip stop parachute silk with built in bandoleers and cargo pockets, being better designed than other paratrooper models of the time.

Originally, green rank insignia was used for SNLF officers. These were worn on either shoulder boards or collar tabs. Enlisted men wore red on green, or red on blue round ratings on the upper sleeves. Later the standard black Japanese Naval collar rank was adopted and worn by officers. The enlisted men went to a black on yellow shield rating. During the war, most enlisted men wore a cloth name tag affixed above their left or right breast pocket bearing information such as their name, rank and unit.

The ankle boots had either a hobnailed hard leather sole with metal heel J-cleat or a rubber sole with rubber cleats. When off duty, sailors could wear tabis, although they sometimes wore them in combat as well.

SNLF officers were not usually issued uniforms so they had to procure their own, thus there was a wide variety in the details, color and texture of their uniforms, with uniform colors ranging from pale to dark green. Collars were stiffer and materials were of a higher quality.

=== Headgear ===
The SNLF used a mix of models.

- Adrian helmet - These included two variations of an Adrian-styled army helmet, the first which had a metal anchor on the front and was nicked-named the "star vent" helmet as it had several open vents on the top in the shape of a star. The second variation was an improved star vent helmet with a metal sakura attached above the vents to prevent rainwater from entering the helmet. The Type 1 star vent and sakura helmets continued to be sporadically used by rear units until about 1941.
- Brodie style - an IJN navy-designed prototype helmet bearing some resemblance to the Brodie helmet, and was extensively utilized during the January 28 incident.
- Type 90 Army helmet - Army issue Type 90 helmets were also occasionally seen in use during the early to mid 1930s. In 1932 the IJN adopted their own version of the IJA's Type 90 helmet and gave it the designation of 'Type 2'. The previously aforementioned star vent, sakura and navy prototype helmets were then grouped under the designation of Type 1. The new Type 2 helmet was officially called tetsubo (steel cap) but was called tetsukabuto ("steel helmet") by troops. It was made in the shape of a dome with a short protruding rim all the way around it evenly, unlike the frontally flared rim on the IJN's Type 1 helmets. This helmet was made of a thin inferior chrome-molybdenum steel with many proving to be fragile, being easily pierced by shrapnel and/or gunfire. An anchor for the IJN was fixed to the front with two bendable prongs attached to the back of the badge. They passed through a slit in the front of the shell and were then bent over to secure the badge to the helmet. The helmet and anchor were then painted in an earth brown color. Late into the war the IJN simplified their helmet production and removed the metal anchor from the design, replacing it with a rivet and a yellow anchor painted on the front. A tan cover known as a first pattern was adopted around the middle of 1938, it featured a two layer, fiber reinforced olive linen cover with a wool/felt two piece anchor sewn on the front. The second pattern cover had a one piece embroidered anchor insignia sewn on the front. The third pattern was further simplified with a bevo woven anchor insignia sewn onto its front. Nets were then used to add a camo effect. The helmet was secured to the head by an elaborate set of straps descended from those of the Kabuto samurai helmet, although IJN helmet tapes were tied differently from the way the IJA tied them. It was also able to be worn over a field cap, which was commonly done in the field for comfort. Camouflage nets were widely worn over the helmet especially in the Southern theatre and Pacific island campaign.

== Other items ==
The SNLF carried a variety of items, some of it IJN produced material and others being borrowed from the IJA.

- Ammunition belt – A leather belt with a brass buckle was worn by enlisted members of the SNLF. For riflemen it carried two front ammunition pouches and a rear pouch with an oiler, along with a bayonet attached to the left side. Secondary support troops in the SNLF generally wore the belt with only a bayonet attached on the left side, accompanied by a pistol holster secured by a secondary belt that went over the right shoulder.
- Haversack – Enlisted troops were issued a haversack similar to IJA troops, but the material differed and it was a slightly smaller size. The haversack was normally worn with the strap tucked under their ammunition belt on the left hip, and carried rations and items necessary for daily use.
- Canteen – The Japanese Navy issue canteen, distinct in appearance from the IJA canteen, was standard for all SNLF troops. The canteen had a metal body with a khaki or olive green canvas cover, along with an aluminum cap that was gold, silver or black in color, connected to a shoulder strap by a small chain. For enlisted men the canteen was commonly worn on the right hip and with the strap tucked under the ammunition belt.
- First aid kit – Most of the SNLF troops were initially intended to carry a small medical pouch marked with a red cross on the top, held by an adjustable shoulder strap. Inside were medical items for troops to conduct emergency first aid if an injury were to occur during combat.
- Gas mask – Some troops carried a Japanese Navy issue gas mask with them. The gas mask was stored in a canvas bag secured by a small belt. A flexible tube ran from the gas mask to a canister worn on the back with adjustable canvas straps supporting it. The two common gas masks were the Type 93 and Type 97, which saw use by the SNLF extensively during the late 1930s, with sporadic use continuing throughout the entire Pacific War.
- Signal Flags – In SNLF units some of the troops were issued two signal flags, one red and one white, stored in a canvas pouch worn on the belt. These flags were intended to be used for communication with Japanese aircraft operating within the area.
- Bugle – The SNLF initially had many troops carry bugles for communication, though this practice became less common in late war units. They carried the same three-looped Type 90 bugle as the IJA and in some cases older double-looped bugles predating the Type 90. Unlike the IJA who held their bugles sideways while playing, SNLF held their bugles straight.
- Heat Resistant Fatigues – Light-khaki cotton fatigues consisting of an open collared three button tunic with a single breast pocket along with shorts were adopted as a work uniform for hot weather, though in some rare circumstances these were also worn in combat. The fatigues were often worn with white tube socks and a white cotton navy cap or a khaki bucket hat.
- Tenugui (手ぬぐい) is a multi purpose cloth or towel in the Japanese culture, usually made of white cloth, printed with an anchor or patriotic phrases often accompanied by patriotic symbols as well. These were sometimes worn under the helmet or during work as a "Hachimaki" (鉢巻) headband.
- Senninbari (千人針) were a red-sash 1,000 stitch belt sometimes worn around the waist of their uniforms. They were supposed to bring good luck and confer courage.

== Weapons ==
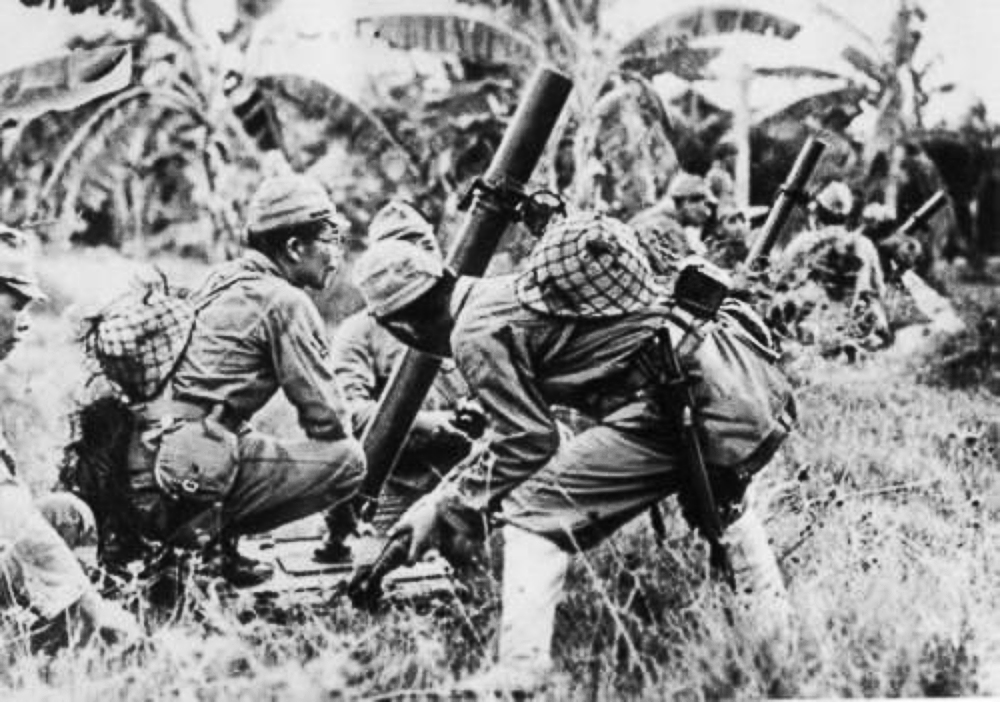
Soldiers of an IJN Special Naval Landing Force unit are preparing to fire their Type 97 81mm Infantry Mortars

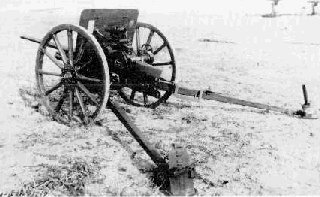
Type 1 37 mm anti-tank gun

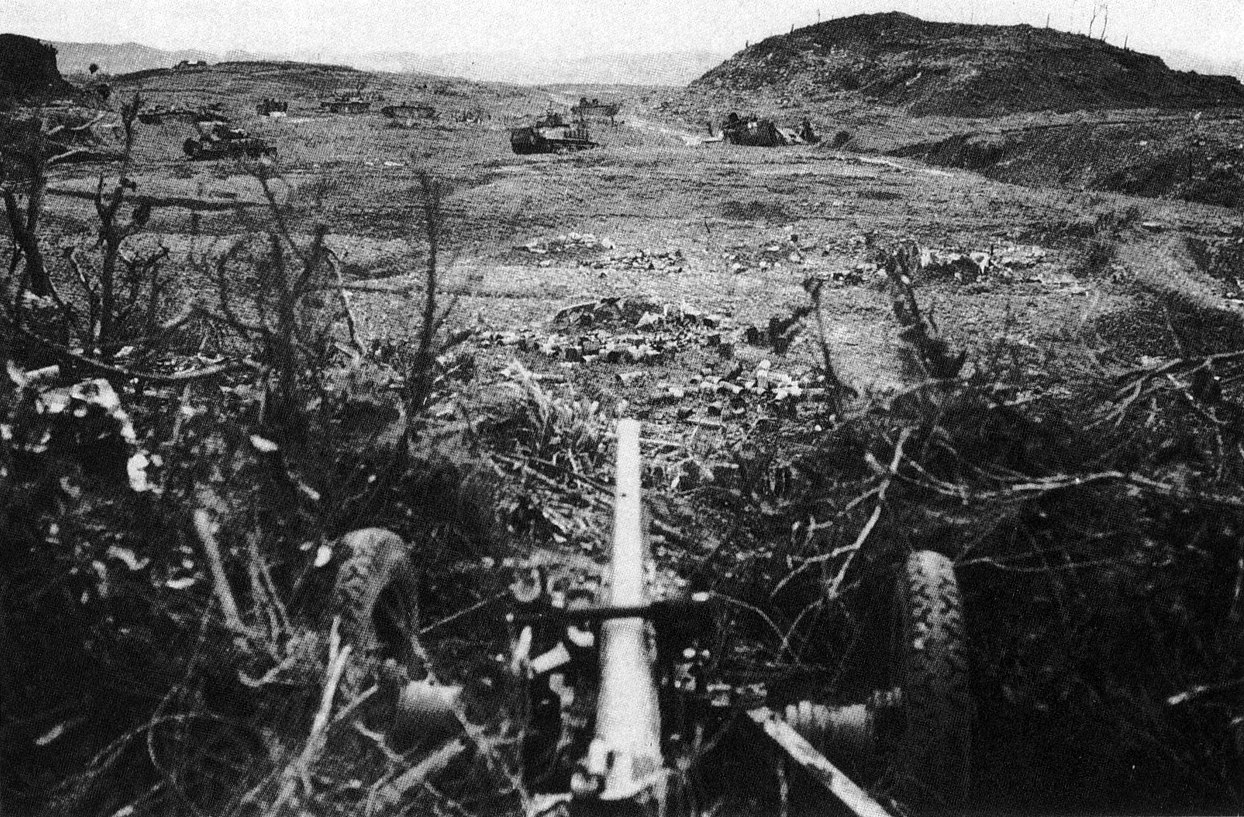
IJN Type 1 47mm Antitank Gun, Battle of Okinawa

=== Heavy weapons ===
- 75mm regimental guns
- 70mm Type 92 Gun
- 3-inch (76mm) naval guns mounted on wheeled carriages
- Type 97 81mm Infantry Mortar
- Type 11 37 mm Infantry Gun
- Type 94 37 mm Anti-Tank Gun
- Type 1 37 mm Anti-Tank Gun
- Type 1 47 mm Anti-Tank Gun
- Type 92 13.2 mm AA machinegun on a twin mount
- 25 mm shipboard AA gun adapted for land use

=== Armor and tanks ===
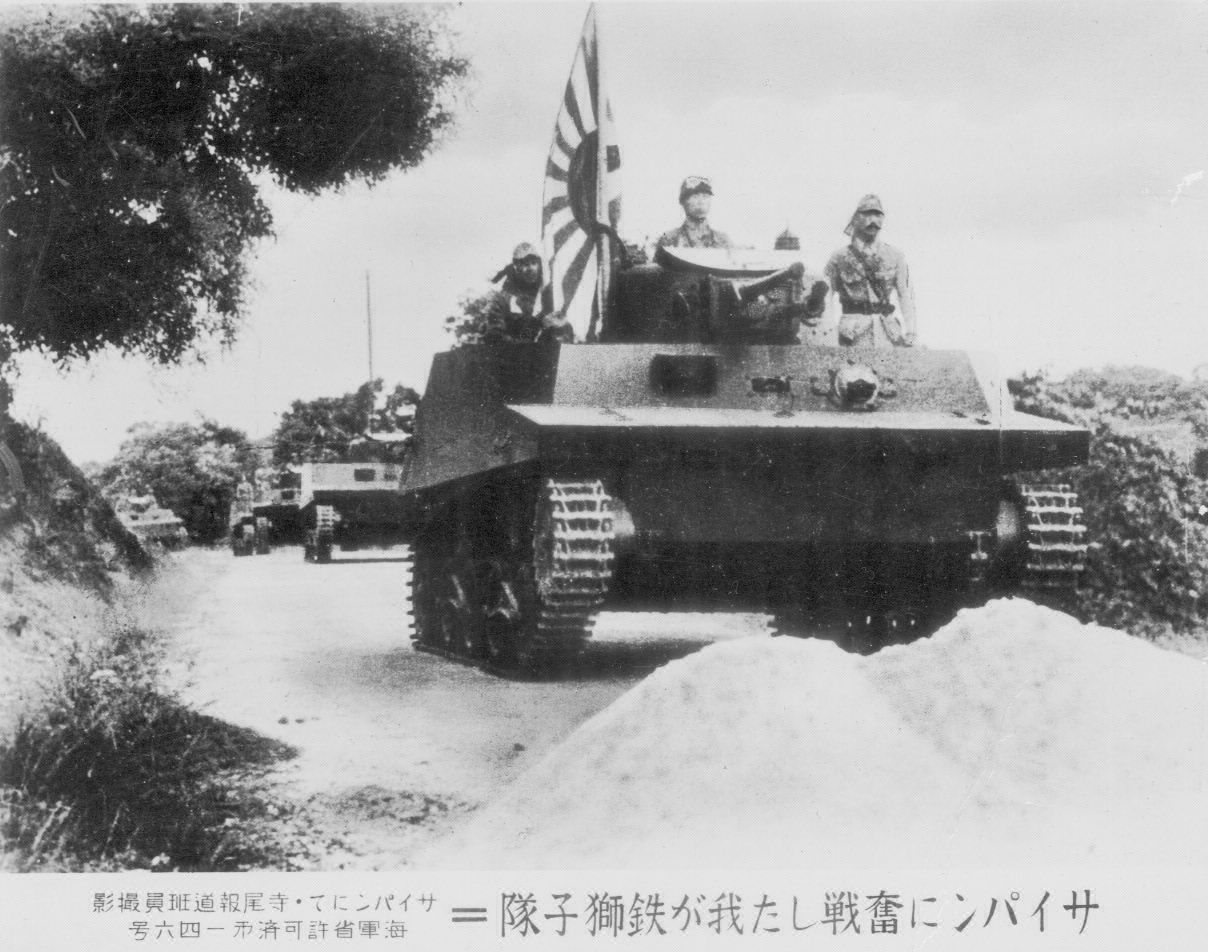
Yokosuka 1st SNLF Type 2 Ka-Mi amphibious tank on Saipan

- Type Ka Kijusha a/k/a Type Ka machine gun car (Carden Loyd tankette)
- Type 92 heavy armoured car (tankette)
- Type 94 tankette
- Type 97 Te-Ke tankette
- Type 89 Chi-Ro medium tank
- Type 95 Ha-Go light tank
- Type 97 Chi-Ha medium tank
- Type 97 Shinhoto Chi-Ha medium tank
- Short barrel 120 mm gun tank

=== Amphibious tanks ===
- Type 2 amphibious tank Ka-Mi
- Type 3 amphibious tank Ka-Chi
- Type 5 amphibious tank To-Ku - prototype only

=== APCs and armored cars ===
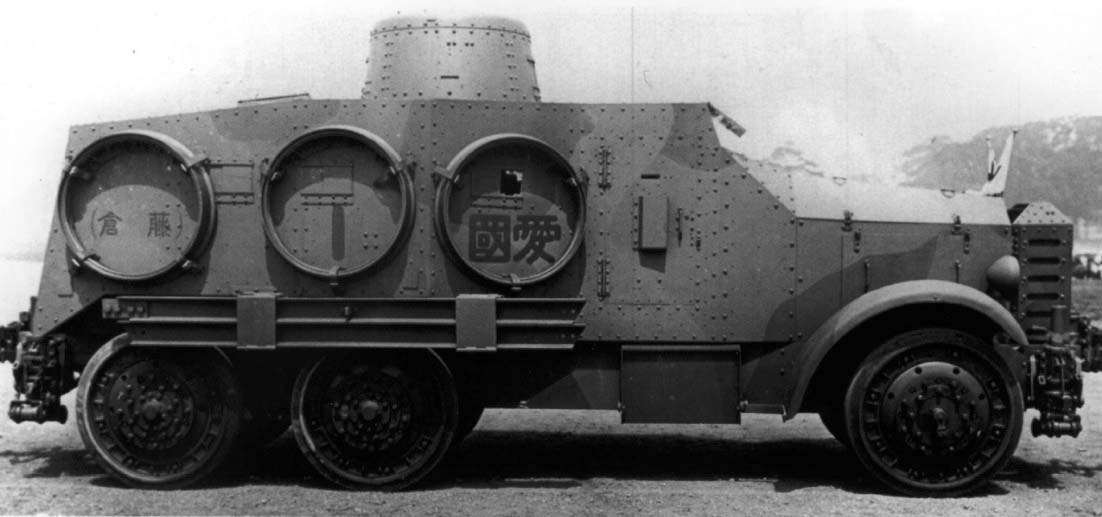
Sumida Model P armored car

- Type 4 Ka-Tsu amphibious APC vehicle
- Vickers Crossley armoured car
- Type 2592 Chiyoda armored car
- Sumida Model P armored car, variant of the Type 91 Sumida M.2593
- Type 93 armoured car a/k/a Type 2593 Hokoku, Type 93 Kokusanor or "Type 92" naval armored car

=== Amphibious and land trucks ===
- Type 95 Mini-truck
- Toyota Amphibious Truck "Su-Ki"

=== Infantry weapons ===
- Type 92 bipod-mounted MGs
- Type 92 13.2 mm heavy machine gun
- Type 3 heavy machine gun
- Type 92 heavy machine gun
- Type 11 light machine gun
- Arisaka rifles
- Type I Rifle
- Hamada, Nambu pistols and Type 26 revolvers
- Sugiura pistol
- MP 18 and MP 28 submachine guns
- Type 100 submachine gun
- Model 2 submachine gun
- Light Mortars
- Type 97 hand grenades
- Grenade launchers
- Rifle grenades
- Light AT weapons
- Flamethrowers
- Military swords
- Bayonets

== See also ==
- Ranks of the Imperial Japanese Navy - World War II
- Amphibious Rapid Deployment Brigade - Modern successor
