= SNLF =

SNLF can refer to:

- Special Naval Landing Forces, in the Imperial Japanese Navy
- Sandinista National Liberation Front, a socialist political party in Nicaragua
