= 2nd Maizuru Special Naval Landing Force =

The 2nd Maizuru SNLF was an infantry battalion of the Imperial Japanese Navy's Special Naval Landing Forces.

Formed at the Maizuru Naval District, the 2nd Maizuru SNLF participated in the battle of Wake Island and invasion of Kavieng.

On February 1, the unit was disbanded and formed the ground security section within the 8th Special Base Force at Rabaul.
