= Type 93 armoured car =

Japanese interwar armoured car

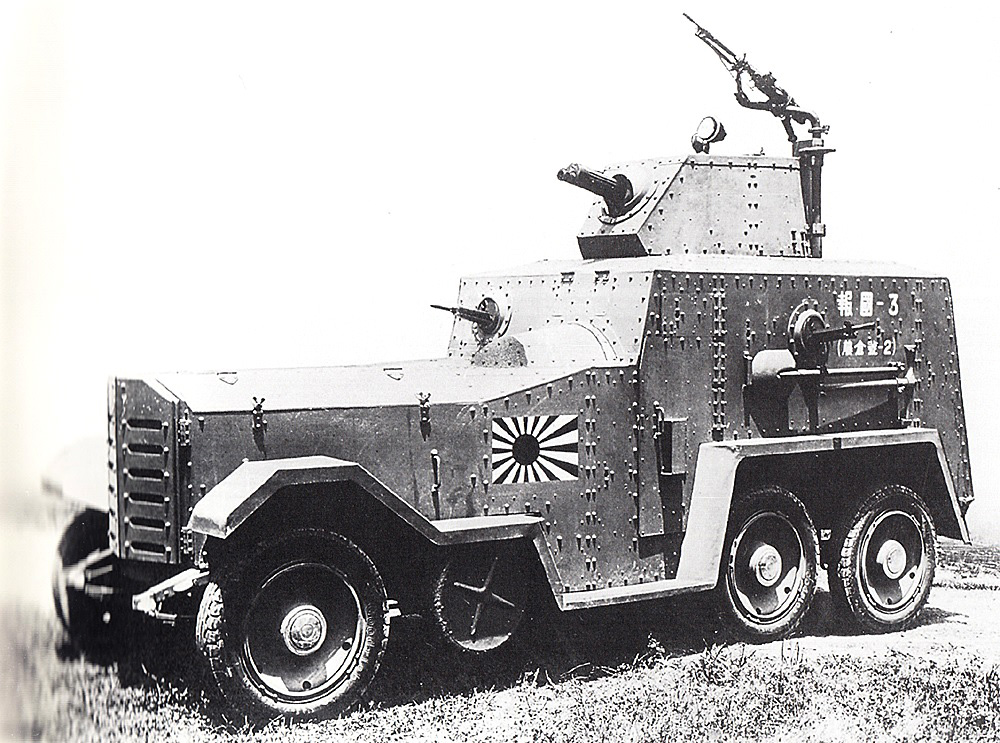
- A Type 93 armoured car of the Special Naval Landing Forces
- Place of origin: Empire of Japan

Production history
- Designed: 1933
- Manufacturer: Ishikawajima Motorcar Factory (Isuzu)
- Produced: 1933
- No. built: 5

Specifications
- Mass: 4.5 tons
- Length: 4.80 meters
- Width: 1.80 meters
- Height: 2.30 meters
- Crew: 4 to 6
- Armor: 8-11 mm
- Main armament: 1x 7.7mm Vickers Mk I medium machine gun
- Secondary armament: 4x 6.5mm Type 91 or Nambu Type 11 machine guns
- Engine: gasoline (petrol); 85 hp
- Suspension: wheeled
- Operational range: 170 km (110 mi)
- Maximum speed: 40 km/h road, 59.5 km/h rail

The Type 93 armoured car (九三式装甲自動車) was an armoured car used by the Empire of Japan both before and during World War II in China.

== Design and history ==
The Type 93 was specifically designed to be operated on rail or roads. The vehicle had three axles; to provide better balance and pitch control, a pair of auxiliary metal wheels were mounted behind the front axle. Armament consisted of one 7.7 mm machine gun and four 6.5 mm Type 91 machine guns or four Nambu Type 11 machine guns. Its anti-aircraft machine-gun mount could be stowed inside the top turret. It is also known as the Type 2593 "Hokoku" or Type 93 "Kokusan" armored car. It has also been incorrectly referred to as a Type 92, when the "right designation is Type 93".

The Type 93 was originally made for use by the Japanese Navy marine units of the Special Naval Landing Forces. Production was very limited, with an estimate of only five being produced for use in China. The vehicle was considered a superior design to the Chiyoda armored car. The "gable-roof bonnet" was designed to deflect grenades and the front sloping plate of its turret allowed it to fire at the high angle needed to reach the top floors of buildings on the narrow Chinese streets. IJN armored cars were to be used in tactical deployment in the coastal regions of China near ports and Japanese bases.

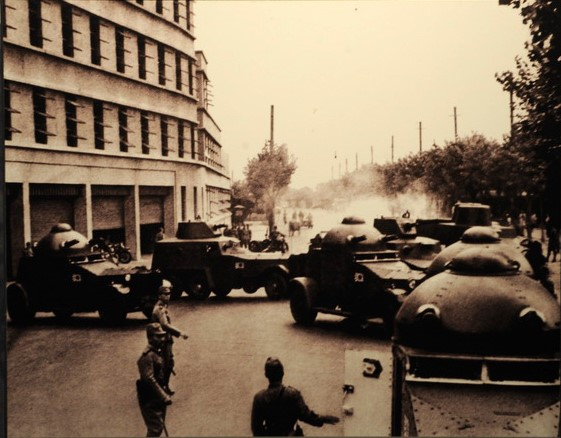
Japanese armored cars in the Battle for Shanghai. Vickers Crossley Armoured Cars and a Type 93 armoured car (second from left) are shown
