= 5th Yokosuka Special Naval Landing Force =

The 5th Yokosuka Special Naval Landing Force (5th Yokosuka SNLF) was an infantry battalion of the Imperial Japanese Navy's Special Naval Landing Forces.

Formed at the Yokosuka Naval District, the 5th Yokosuka SNLF participated in the Battle of Buna and minorly in the Guadalcanal Campaign.
