= Type 2 Ka-Mi =

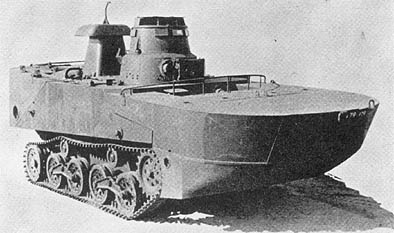
- Type 2 Ka-Mi with its flotation sections attached
- Type: Amphibious light tank
- Place of origin: Empire of Japan

Service history
- Used by: Imperial Japanese Navy

Production history
- Designed: 1941
- Produced: 1942–1943
- No. built: 182–184

Specifications
- Mass: 12.3 tons (9.15 tons without flotation pontoons)
- Length: 7.42 m (4.80 m without flotation pontoons)
- Width: 2.79 m
- Height: 2.34 m
- Crew: 5
- Armor: 6–12 mm front
- Main armament: Type 1 37 mm tank gun
- Secondary armament: 2x Type 97 7.7 mm machine guns
- Engine: Mitsubishi A6120VDe air-cooled inline 6-cylinder diesel 115 hp (84.6 kW)
- Power/weight: 9.3 hp/tonne
- Suspension: bellcrank
- Operational range: 170 km (land); 140 km (swimming)
- Maximum speed: 37 km/h (land); 10 km/h (swimming)

The "special amphibious tank Type 2 Ka-Mi" (特二式内火艇 カミ, Toku-ni-shiki naikatei kami) was the first amphibious tank of the Imperial Japanese Navy (IJN). The Type 2 Ka-Mi was based on the Imperial Japanese Army's Type 95 Ha-Go light tank with major modifications. It first saw combat service during the Guadalcanal campaign in late 1942.

== History and development ==
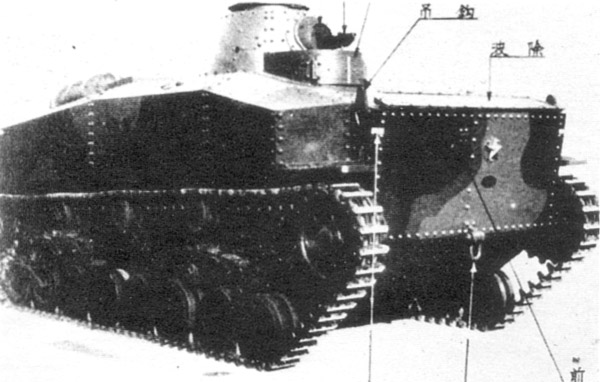
SR I-Go experimental amphibious tank

As early as 1928, the Japanese Army had been developing amphibious tanks and created several experimental models such as the Sumida amphibious armored car (AMP), SR I-Go, SR II Ro-Go, SR III Ha-Go, which were produced only as one-off prototypes for concept testing in the 1930s. Each of the SR series were 3.6 to 7 tonne amphibious tanks with a 2 to 3 man crew, and armed with machine guns.

In 1940, the Imperial Japanese Navy (IJN) took over development of amphibious vehicles. Mitsubishi used the knowledge gained from the SR program and the Type 95 Ha-Go light tank as a base. The Type 1 Mi–Sha a/k/a/ "Type 1 floating tank Ka-Mi" was the first IJN prototype produced. The Type 1 led to the development of the Type 2 Ka-Mi being produced in 1942. The Type 2 Ka-Mi was designed for the IJN's Special Naval Landing Forces for the amphibious invasion of Pacific Islands without adequate port facilities, and for various special operations missions. The Type 2 Ka-Mi tanks were organized into "several amphibious tank units". Beginning in 1942, only 182 to 184 units of this tank were built.

== Design ==
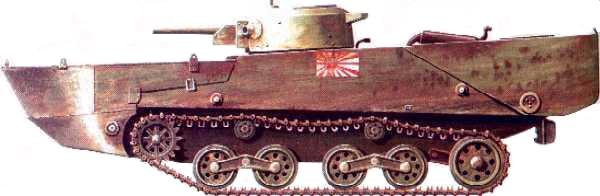
Illustration showing the side view of a Type 2 Ka-Mi with flotation sections fitted

The Type 2 Ka-Mi was based on the army's Type 95 Ha-Go light tank, but with an all-welded hull with rubber seals in place of the riveted armor. It was intended to be water-tight. Large, hollow pontoons made from steel plates were attached to the front glacis plate and rear decking to give the necessary buoyancy. The front pontoon was internally divided into two "symmetrical sections" and each one was divided into three separate watertight compartments to minimize the effects of damage from flooding and shellfire. The pontoons were attached by a system of "small clips" with a release inside the tank, to be engaged once it landed for ground combat operations. The pontoons were filled with kapok.

Its gun turret had a high-velocity Type 1 37 mm gun and a coaxial Type 97 light machine gun. A second Type 97 light machine gun was located in the tank's bow.

The tank was capable of attaining speeds of 10 km/h in the water with a range of 140 km through two propellers situated at the rear of the hull, powered by the tank's engine. Steering was in the control of the tank commander, who operated a pair of rudders from the turret through cables. The crew included an onboard mechanic. According to Steven J. Zaloga, it was the "best designed amphibious tank of the war".

== Combat record ==
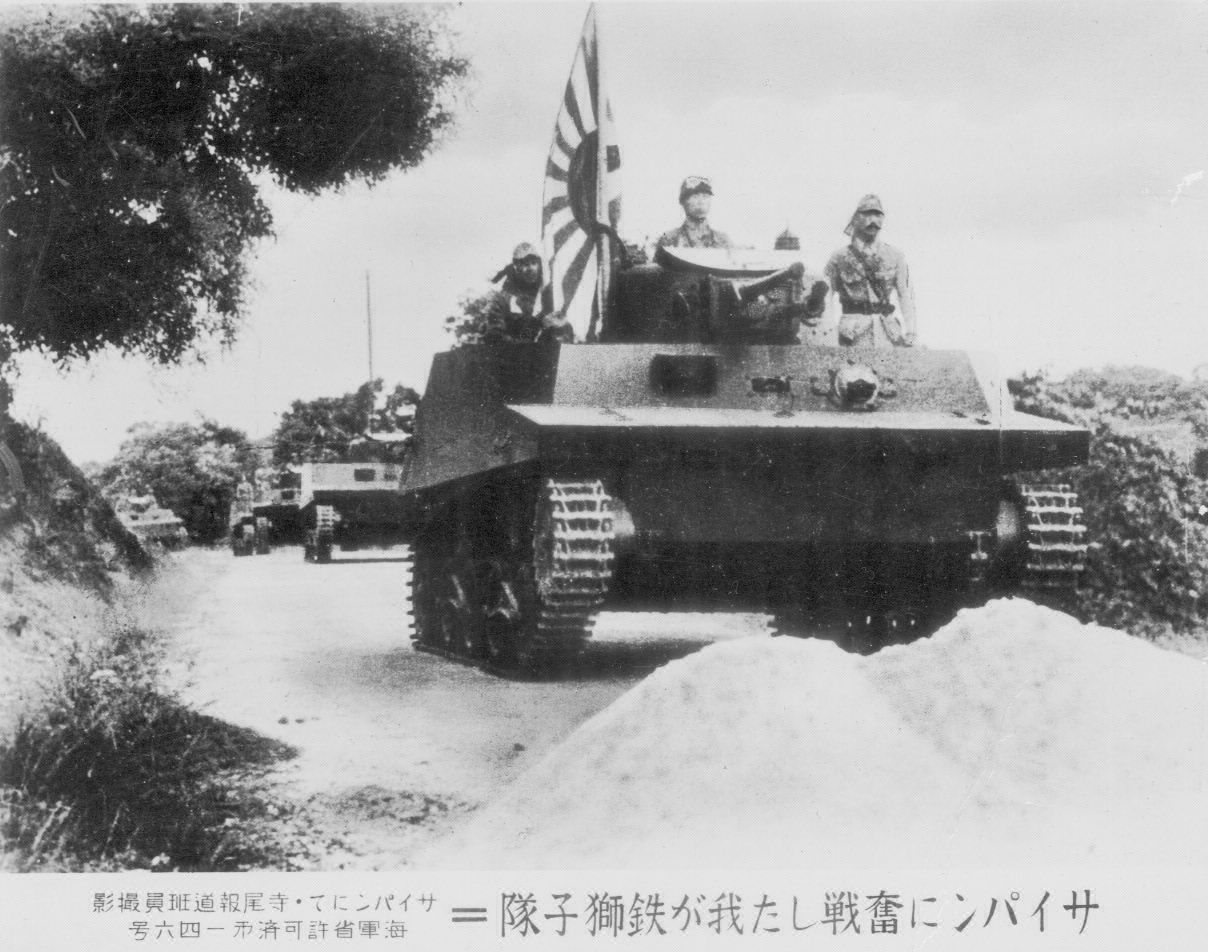
Type 2 Ka-Mi tanks on Saipan without their flotation sections

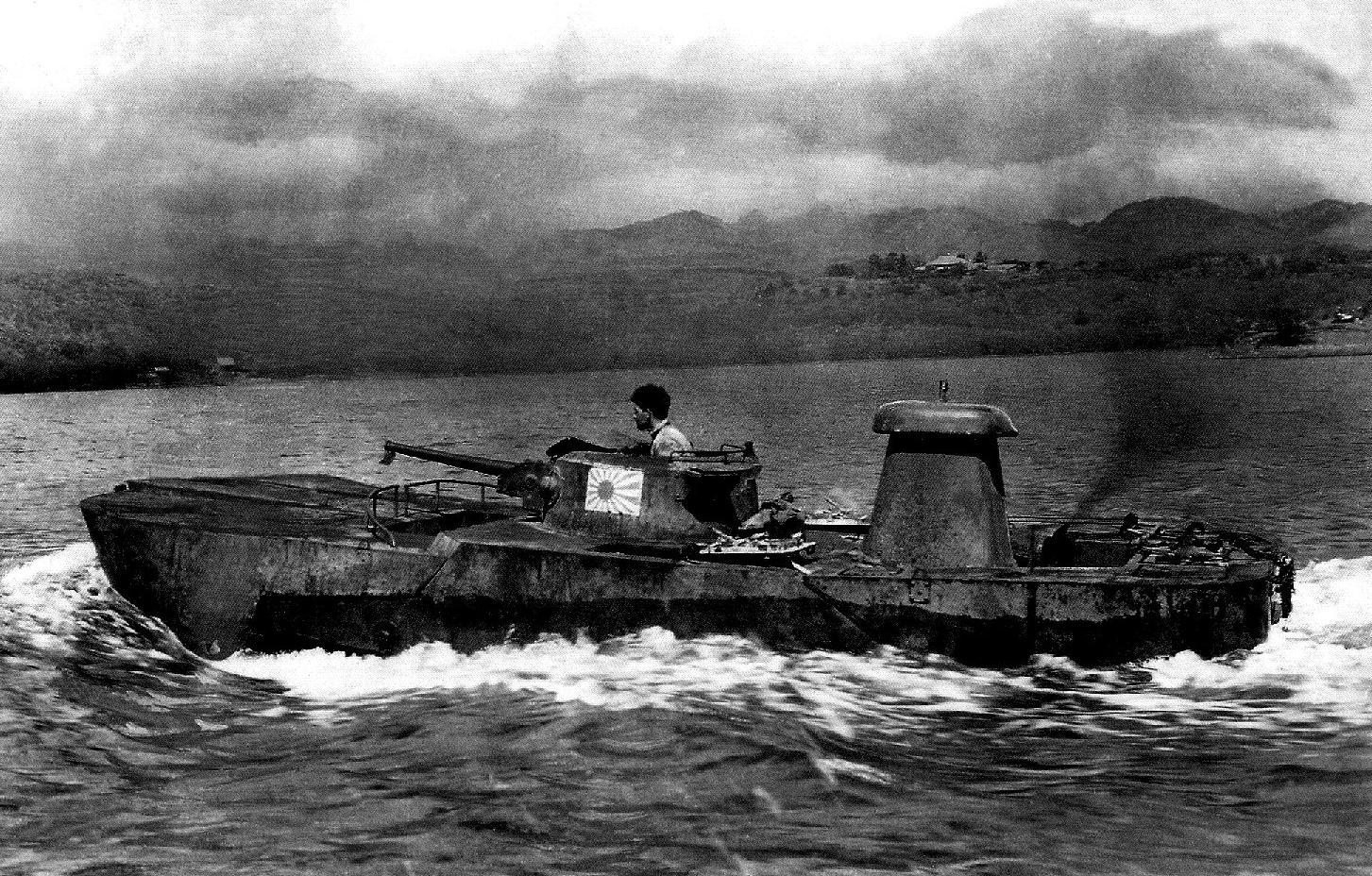
A Type 2 Ka-Mi captured by the U.S. military undergoing sea trials, 1945

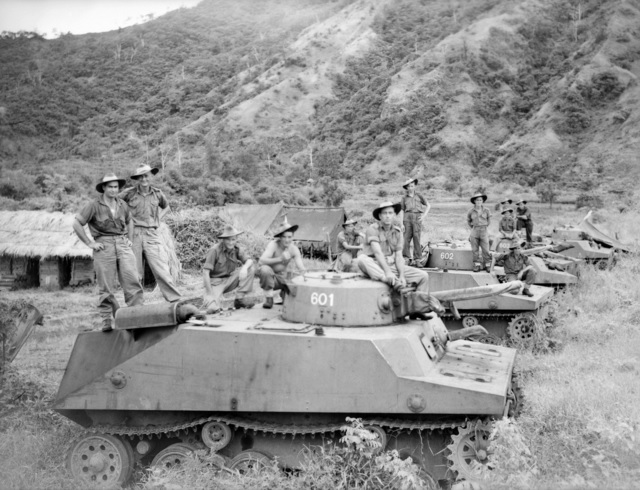
Type 2 Ka-Mi tanks without their flotation sections fitted, after capture by Australian soldiers, 1945

The Type 2 Ka-Mi came into active service after the initial campaigns of World War II, and thus for the most part was too late to be used in its original design mission of amphibious landings. Many units were assigned to detachments of the Special Naval Landing Force (SNLF) at IJN bases at Sasebo, Maizuru, Yokosuka, and Kure.

The Type 2 Ka-Mi was first used in combat during the Guadalcanal campaign in late 1942. Later they were encountered by the United States Marine Corps in the Marshall Islands and Mariana Islands, particularly on Saipan, where they supported the Yokosuka Base SNLF in its failed amphibious operation. They were used during the fighting on the Philippine island of Leyte in late 1944 when they supported the 101st SNLF at Ormoc Gulf and also used piecemeal in the fighting for Luzon. According to Ralph Zumbro in his book "Tank Aces", several Ka-Mi were destroyed by US Army LVT-1s off the coast of Leyte during history's only amphibious tank vs. amphibious tank action; this is doubtful, however, as most Ka-Mi tanks were destroyed after they came ashore at Ormoc. A handful more were captured by US Army troops on Luzon in 1945, as well as several others captured by Australian and Commonwealth troops.

== Surviving vehicles ==
Patriot Park, Kubinka, Moscow Oblast, Russia has a Type 2 Ka-Mi on display. It is complete with its front and rear pontoons. It was formerly on display in the Kubinka Tank Museum. A near complete hull is located near the airport in Babeldaob, Palau. Another specimen is located in Koror, Palau. The latter is notable in that there is still a heavy anti-aircraft machine gun mounted on the rear pontoon. These two tanks were once located in the center of Babeldaop Island in the late 1980s. They had actually been buried by the Japanese either to keep them out of American hands after their surrender, or as defensive fortifications. After the war they were unearthed by locals. They were subsequently moved, one to the Old Communications center south of the airport, and one to Koror as part of war memorial displays. The list below includes ones mentioned and others that have survived in one form or another.

- Patriot Park, Kubinka, Russia
- Victory Park, Poklonnaya Hill, Russia
- Koror, Palau
- Near Airai Village, Airai, Palau
- Five tanks northeast of Camp Katuu, Airai, Palau (one is about 3 km away)
- Private property, Arakabesang Island, Palau
- Two tanks on Shumshu, Kuril Islands, Russia (one is on the southwest coast)
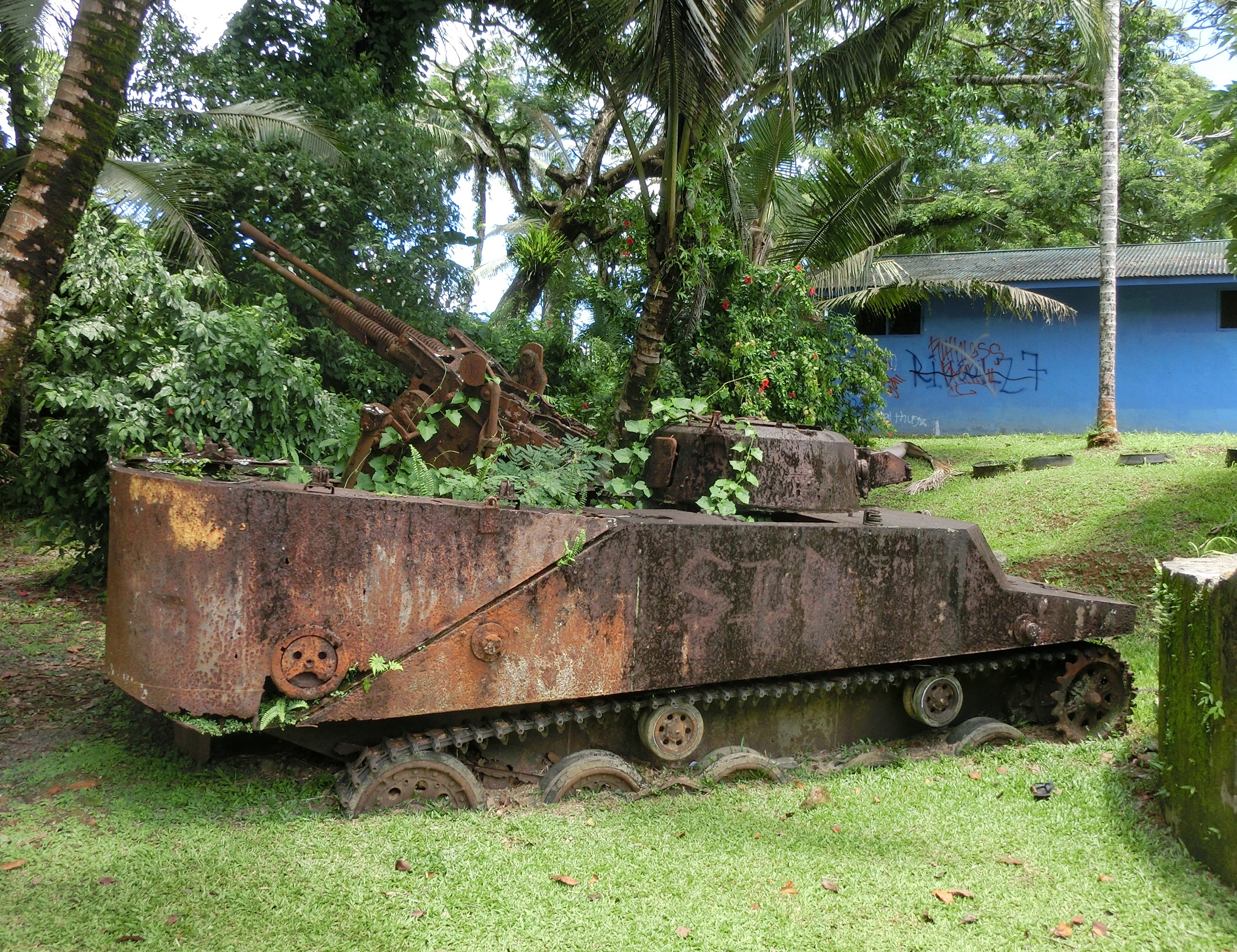
Type 2 Ka-Mi on Koror Island. The Type 96 autocannon was likely added post-war.

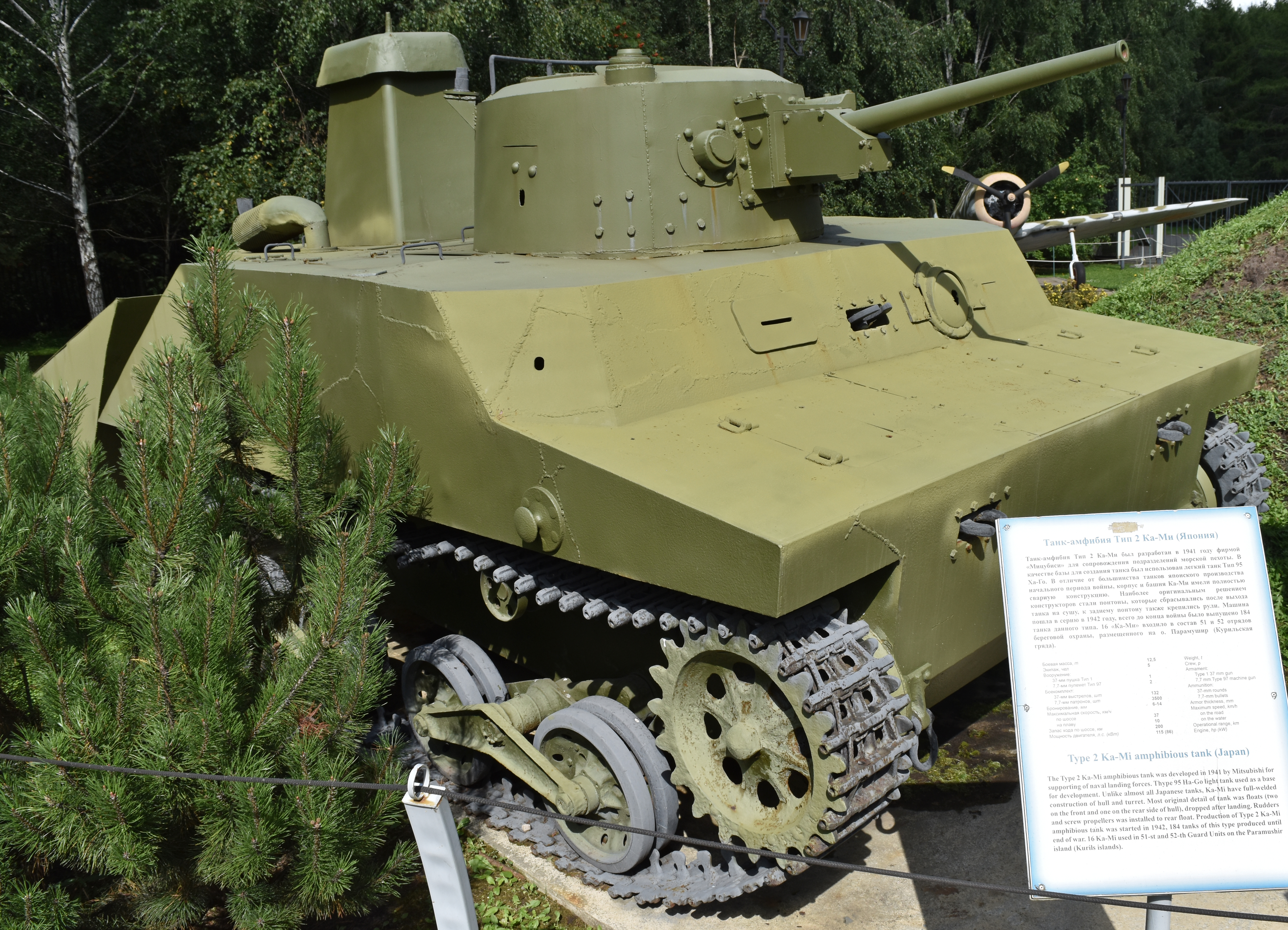
Type 2 Ka-Mi in Victory Park, Russia.

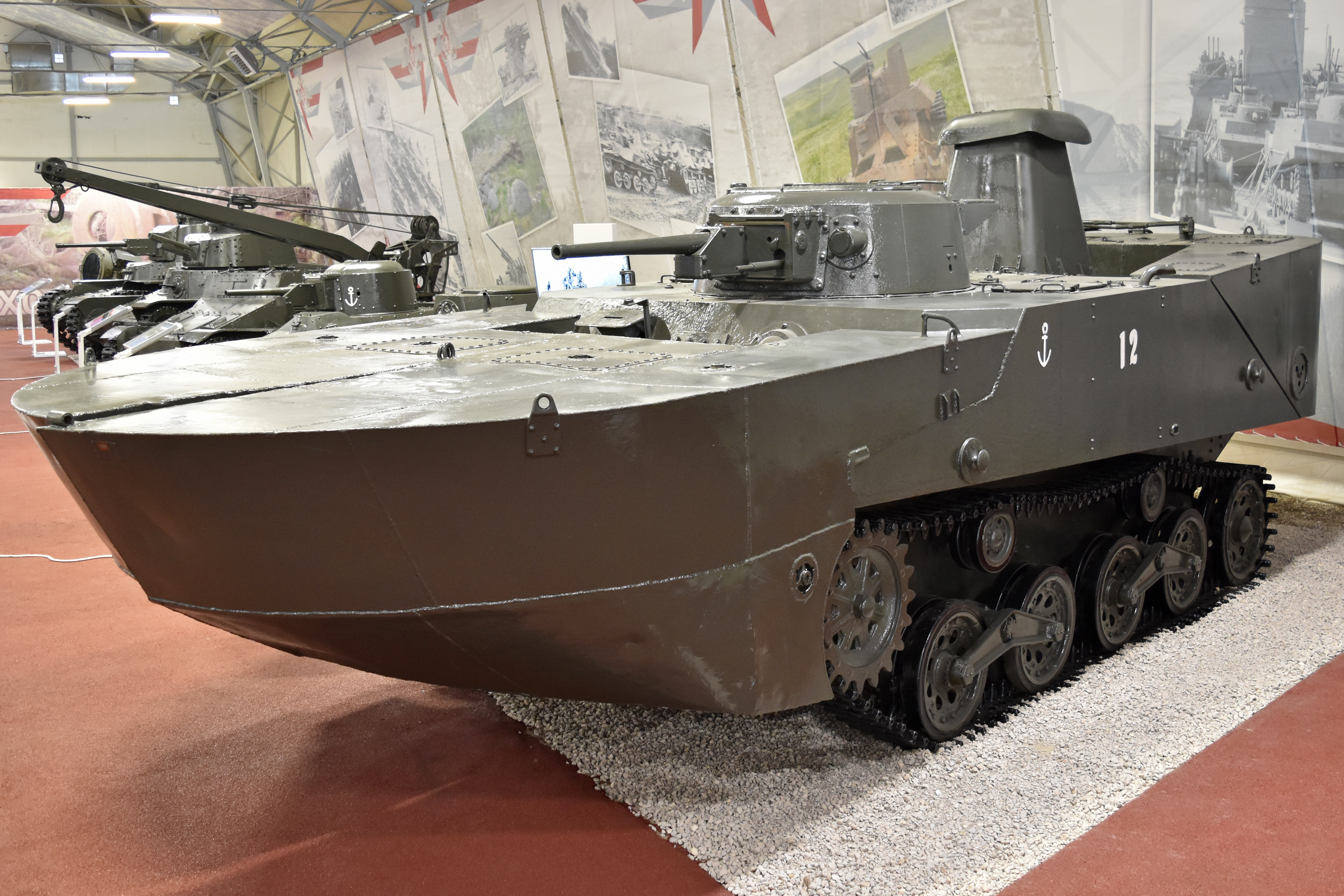
Type 2 Ka-Mi in Patriot Park, Russia.

== See also ==
- DD tank - World War II British tank flotation system
- T-38 - World War II, Soviet amphibious tank
