= Type 1 37 mm anti-tank gun =

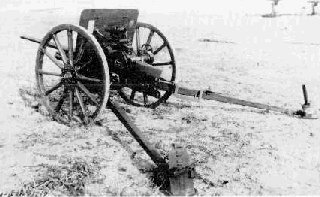
- Type 1 37 mm anti-tank gun
- Type: Anti-tank gun
- Place of origin: Empire of Japan

Service history
- In service: 1943–1945
- Used by: Imperial Japanese Army
- Wars: World War II

Production history
- Designed: 1941
- Produced: 1943–1945
- No. built: 599

Specifications
- Mass: 725 pounds (329 kg)
- Barrel length: 1.85 m (50 calibers)
- Shell: 37×254 mm. R
- Caliber: 37 mm
- Action: Breech loading
- Recoil: hydro-spring
- Elevation: -10 to +36 degrees
- Muzzle velocity: 780 m/s
- Maximum firing range: 6,000 meters
- Sights: Straight telescope.

The Type 1 37 mm anti-tank gun (一式機動三十七粍速射砲, Isshiki Kidō sanjyūnana-miri sokushahō) was an anti-tank gun developed by the Imperial Japanese Army, and used in combat during World War II. The Type 1 number was designated for the year the gun was accepted, 2601 in the Japanese imperial year calendar, or 1941 in the Gregorian calendar.

== History and development ==
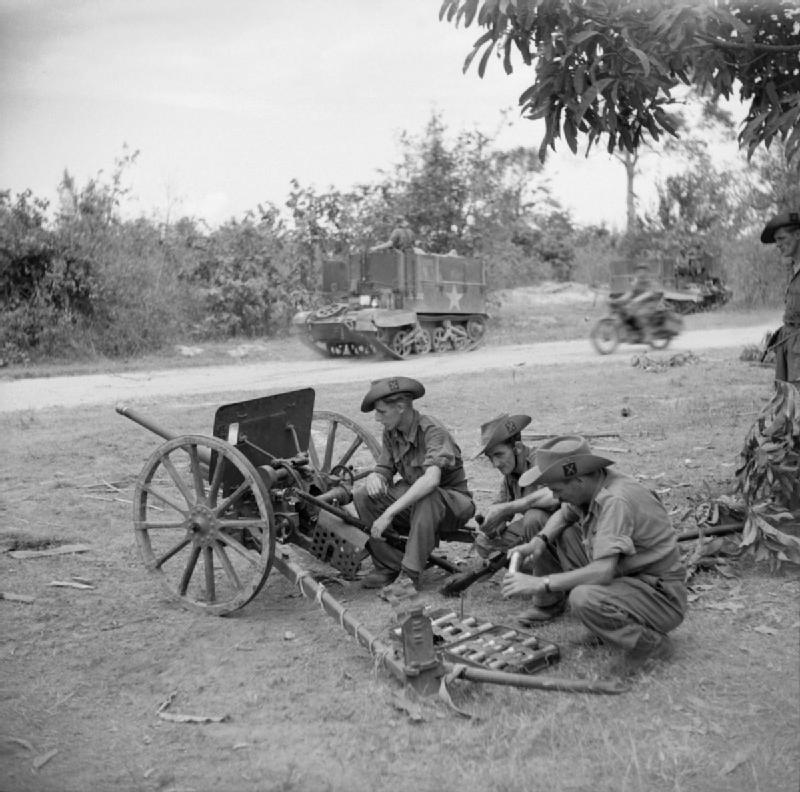
Soldiers examine a captured Japanese 37mm anti-tank gun, January 1945

After the Nomonhan Incident, the shortcomings of the Type 94 37 mm anti-tank gun had become obvious, and the Imperial Japanese Army started the development of a new anti-tank gun to be more effective against the new Soviet tanks. However, as a new design would take time, as an interim measure, the existing Type 94 37 mm AT gun was modified with a longer barrel to provide for greater armor penetration. Despite the designation of Type 1 37 mm AT gun, it was not introduced to combat units until 1943.

== Design ==
The Type 1 37 mm AT gun was basically a Type 94 37 mm AT gun with a longer gun barrel. As with the Type 94, it had a very low profile and was intended to be operated from a squat or prone position. The gun had a gun shield to protect the gunner. It used a semi-automatic breech block with a horizontal sliding wedge. When the gun was fired the spent shell casing was automatically ejected and upon loading a fresh shell the breech block closed automatically. A hydro-spring recoil mechanism was housed under barrel. The weapon had a split trail which opened to an angle of 60 degrees for firing to improve stability. Transport was by towing behind a truck or horse, via two steel disc wheels fitted with sponge rubber filled tires.

== Combat record ==
The Type 1 37 mm AT gun was available only in limited quantities, and the additional barrel length provided for only an incremental improvement in performance over the more numerous Type 94 37 mm AT gun. It was marginally effective against the Allied M3 Stuart light tank in the Pacific War, but not against the M4 Sherman which was soon fielded in large numbers by the Allies. It was fielded in a wide variety of areas, but most notably Southeast Asia, and continued to be used with diminishing effectiveness until the end of World War II.

== Type 1 37 mm tank gun ==
A variant known as the Type 1 37 mm tank gun was used as the main armament of the Type 2 Ke-To, and Type 2 Ka-Mi tanks. The tank gun had the following specifications:

- Calibre: 37 mm
- Barrel length: 1.699 m (5 ft 6.9 in) (L45)
- Elevation: -15 to +25 degrees
- AZ angle of fire: 20 degrees
- Muzzle velocity: 800 m/s (2,600 ft/s)
- Penetration: 25 mm (0.98 in) at 1,000 m (1,100 yd)

== Bibliography ==
- Bishop, Chris (eds) The Encyclopedia of Weapons of World War II. Barnes & Nobel. 1998. ISBN 0-7607-1022-8
- Chant, Chris. Artillery of World War II, Zenith Press, 2001, ISBN 0-7603-1172-2
- Hara, Tomio (1973). Japanese Combat Cars, Light Tanks, and Tankettes. AFV Weapons Profile No. 54. Profile Publications Limited.
- McLean, Donald B. Japanese Artillery; Weapons and Tactics. Wickenburg, Ariz.: Normount Technical Publications 1973. ISBN 0-87947-157-3.
- Nakanishi, Ritta Japanese Infantry Arms in World War II, Dainipponkaiga Company 1991, ISBN 4-499-22690-2
- US Department of War, TM 30-480, Handbook on Japanese Military Forces, Louisiana State University Press, 1994. ISBN 0-8071-2013-8
- War Department TM-E-30-480 Handbook on Japanese Military Forces September 1944
