= Chiyoda armored car =

Japanese armored vehicle

Type 92 Chiyoda armoured car
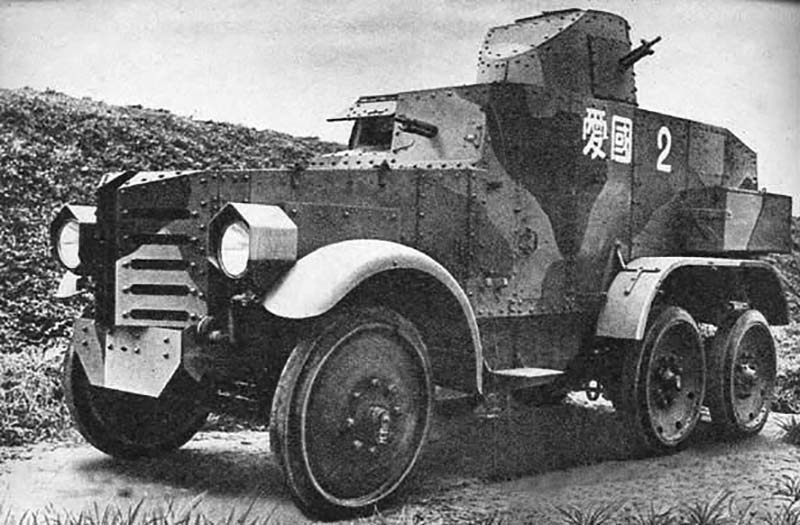
- Chiyoda armoured car
- Place of origin: Empire of Japan

Production history
- Designed: 1930
- Manufacturer: Chiyoda Motor Car Factory (Isuzu)
- Produced: 1931
- No. built: 200

Specifications
- Mass: 5.6 tons
- Length: 5.0 meters
- Width: 1.9 meters
- Height: 2.6 meters
- Crew: 5
- Armor: Up to 6 mm
- Main armament: 3 X Type Taisho 11 6.5 mm MG
- Engine: 4 cylinder gasoline (petrol); 75 hp
- Suspension: leaf spring
- Maximum speed: max 60 km/h

The Chiyoda armored car was the first domestic Japanese armored car, which was officially introduced by the Imperial Japanese Army (IJA) and produced in the 1930s.

== History and development ==
Design started in 1930 at the Chiyoda Motor Car Factory of Tokyo Gasu Denki K. K. (Tokyo Gas and Electric Industries, today Hino Motors Ltd.) based on their Type Q, 6-wheeled truck under the development designation "Type QSW". It had a 4-cylinder petrol engine that produced 75 hp and a weight ratio of 13.4hp/t.

The armor scheme and wheel arrangement were similar to the Wolseley armored car, which had been used by the army. The four-spoke wheels of the Wolseley's were replaced by six-disk wheels with solid rubber tires. The turret had a cylindrical base with a sloped (in the driving direction) right upper part. A machine gun mount was placed in this sloped section for air defense. Another MG mount was placed in the front of the turret, and a third in the left bow. In addition, three gun-visor ports were positioned on each side of the fighting compartment. It had a crew of five, consisting of a driver, three gunners, and a commander. Armament consisted of three Type 11, 6.5 mm machine guns.

It was the first armored car produced by Japan and entered service in 1931. The vehicle was officially adopted as the "Chiyoda armored car". In Western literature, the vehicle is often designated incorrectly as "Aikoku armored car", which is a misinterpretation of the writings on a vehicle used during the 1932 Shanghai Incident. This writing refers to "Aikoku -Koto" = "Public Party of Patriots", a nationalistic and militaristic political party, which donated money and military material to the IJA (as Hokoku did for the Imperial Japanese Navy). It has also been referred to as the Type 92 "Chiysda", which is only a misspelling. The version used by the Imperial Japanese Navy was known as the Type 2592 and had an inline six-cylinder engine producing 85 hp. Chiyoda armored cars were used during several early and mid-1930s operations in northern China for infantry support and security duties in captured regions. A total of 200 Chiyoda armored cars were produced.

== Gallery ==
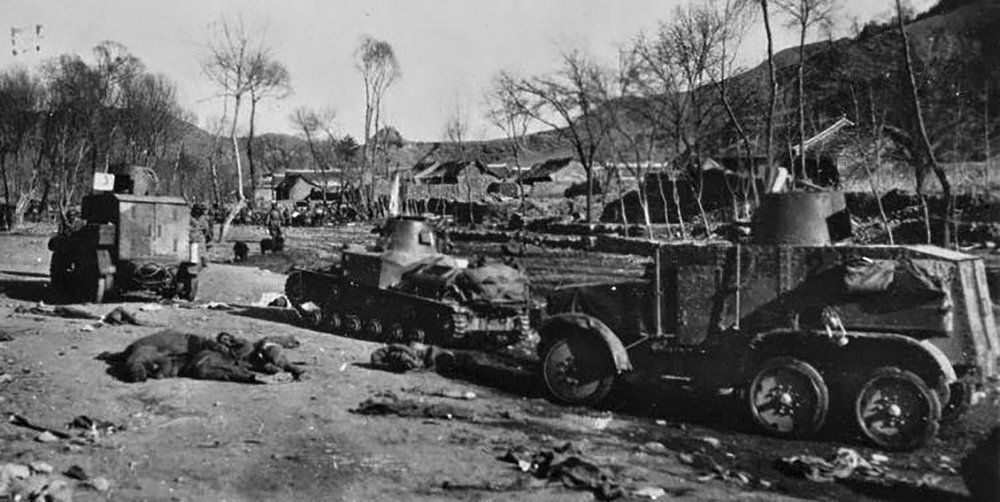
Type 92 Chiyoda armored car and a Type 92 tankette entering a Chinese village; 1930s

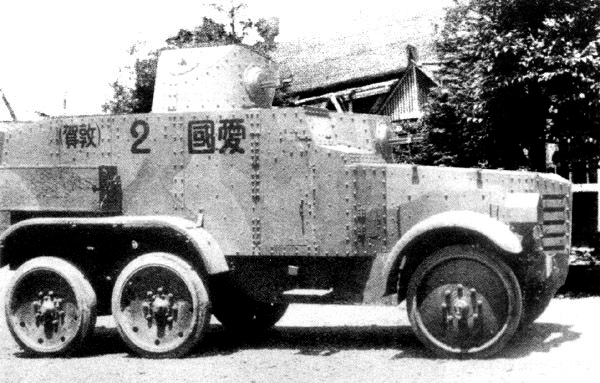
Type 92 Chiyoda armored car in 1935

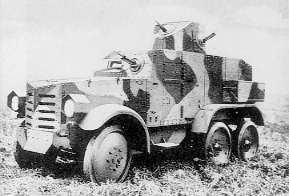
Front angle view of Type 92 Chiyoda armored car
