= Sumida M.2593 =

Sumida M2593 armoured car
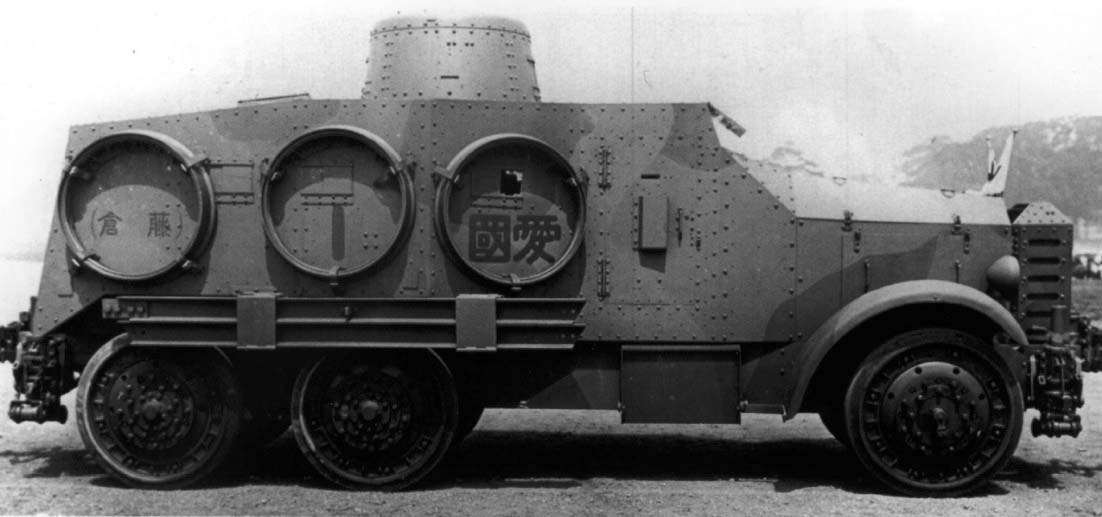
- Type 91 armoured car
- Place of origin: Empire of Japan

Production history
- Manufacturer: Ishikawajima Motorcar Factory (l/k/a Isuzu)
- Produced: 1931
- No. built: 1,000

Specifications
- Mass: 7.7 tons
- Length: 6.57 meters
- Width: 1.9 meters
- Height: 2.95 meters
- Crew: 6
- Armor: 8 mm to 16 mm (front)
- Main armament: 1x 6.5 mm machine gun or 1x 7.7 mm machine gun
- Secondary armament: Slits for rifles or light machine guns
- Engine: 4-cyl gasoline (petrol); 45 hp
- Suspension: wheeled
- Operational range: 241 km (150 mi)
- Maximum speed: 40 km/h road, 60 km/h rail

The Sumida M.2593 (Type 91) was an armoured car produced by the Empire of Japan in the 1930s. It could operate on both the roadway and railway lines. There were two main versions of the Sumida M.2593 produced. The Type 91 armoured railroad car was used by the army and the Sumida Model P armored car was used by the Special Naval Landing Forces (SNLF) of the navy.

== History ==
Designed by the Sumiya firm, beginning in 1931 the M.2593 was produced at the Ishikawajima Motor Works. A defining feature of this vehicle is that its six road wheels could be exchanged for flanged railway wheels. When not in use, the tires would be secured to the sides of the hull. It had four built-in jacks to raise the vehicle when the wheels were changed. It would take ten to twenty minutes to change the wheels. The front and rear sets of wheels could even be adjusted to various rail gauges. The car was capable of 25 mph (40 km/h) on road and traveling at higher speeds on rails, going up to 37 mph (60 km/h).

The car was successful in covering great distances in the 1937 invasion of China. They were also used in Manchuria, to "guard railway lines". They could be coupled together and operate on the rails like "rolling stock". This led them to be used in joint operations with trains and were used for reconnaissance by the army. The M.2593 had a crew of six men, and was armed with either one 6.5 mm machine gun or one 7.7 mm machine gun. A total of 1,000 units of all versions of this armoured car were produced.

== Variants ==
One version of the Sumida M.2593 (Type 91) was produced without a main fixed machine gun for armament.

A variant produced by Ishikawajima was known as the Sumida Model P armored car. It was used by the Special Naval Landing Forces (SNLF) of the Imperial Japanese Navy (IJN).

== Gallery ==
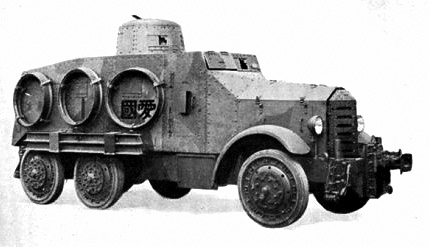
Side view of a Sumida M.2593

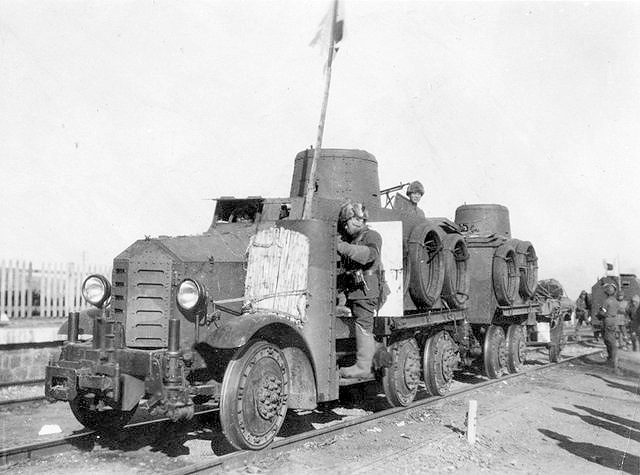
Sumida M.2593 hooked in tandem to another Type 91 (1933)

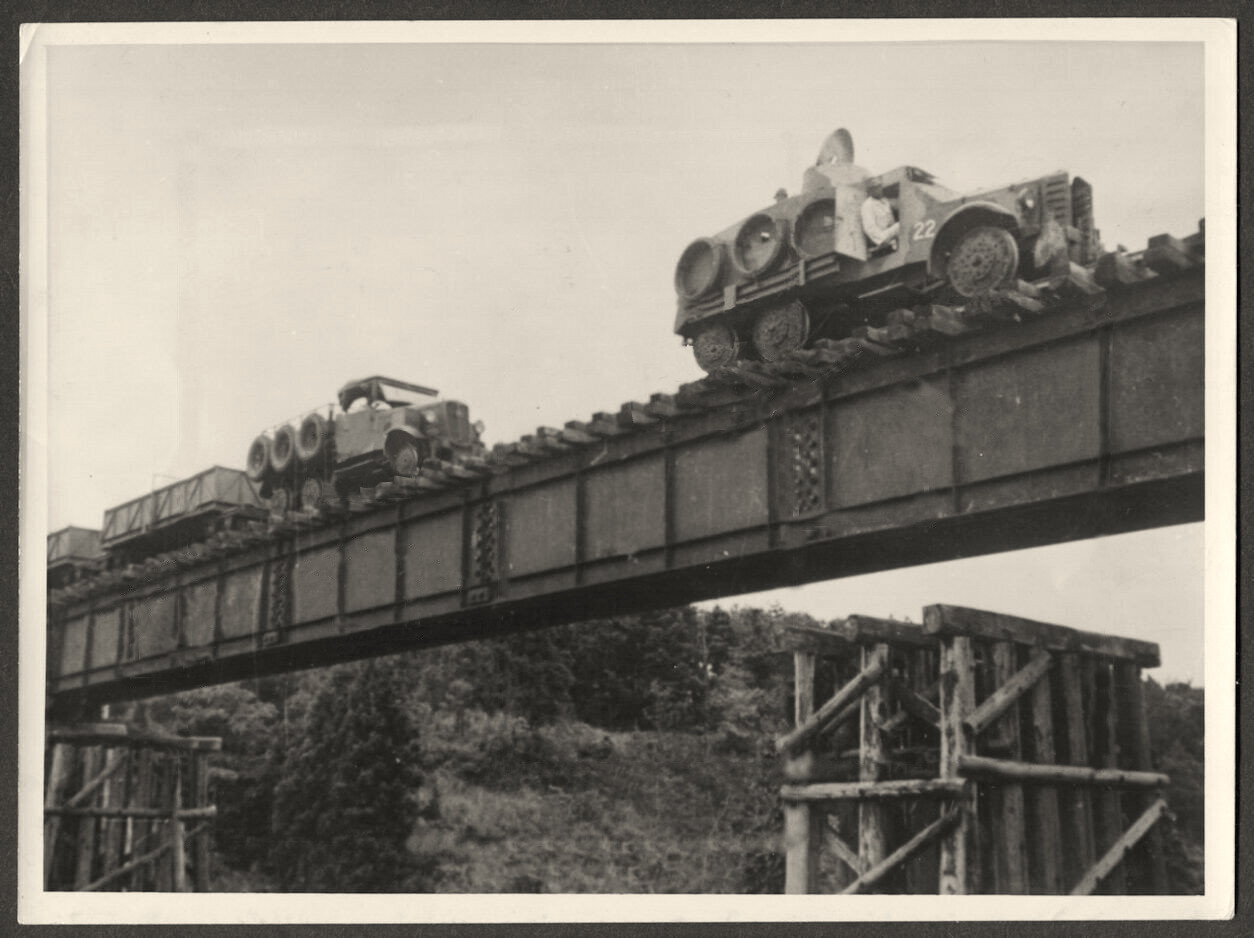
Sumida M.2593 on railway bridge

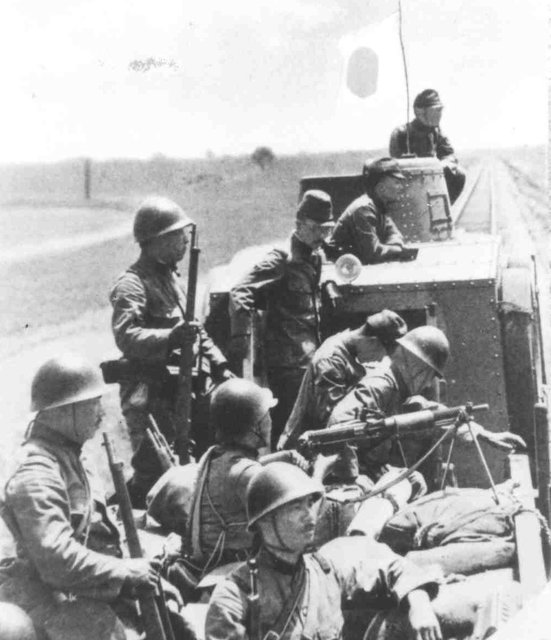
Infantry in a Sumida M.2593, guarding the railroad tracks

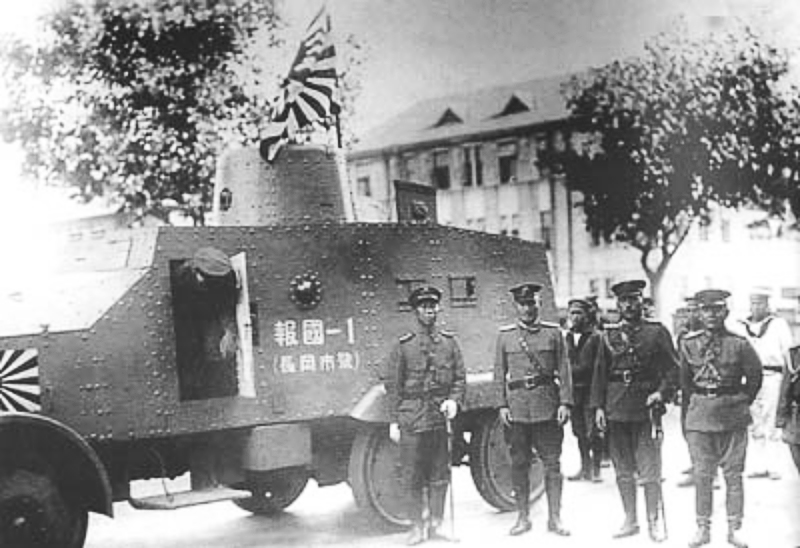
Sumida Model P armored car of the SNLF

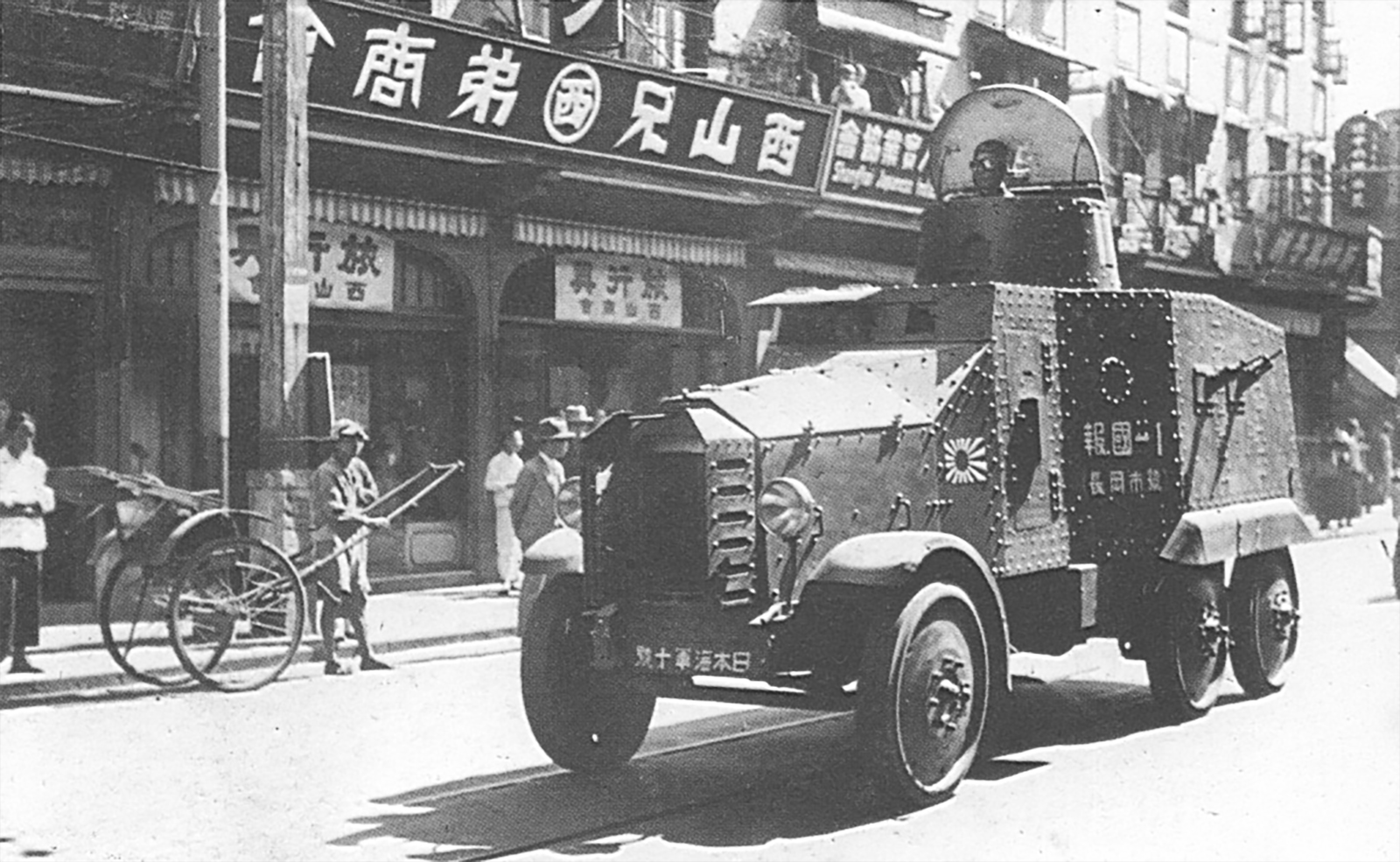
Sumida Model P armored car of the SNLF on patrol

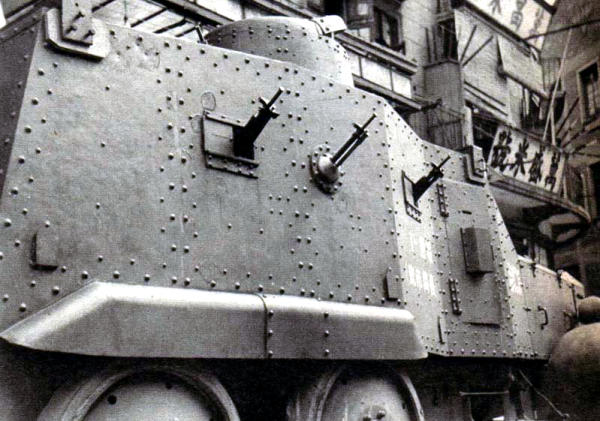
Rear side view of a Sumida Model P armored car (SNLF)
