= Vickers Crossley armoured car =

British armoured car

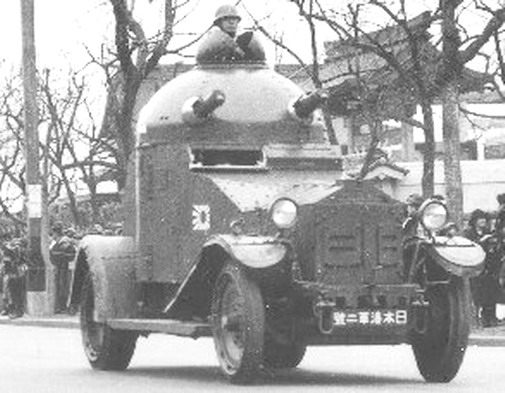
- IJN Vickers Crossley armoured car in Shanghai
- Type: Armoured car
- Place of origin: United Kingdom

Service history
- In service: 1925-1945

Production history
- Designed: 1923
- Manufacturer: Crossley Motors
- Produced: 1925

Specifications
- Mass: 7.5 tons
- Length: 5.02 metres
- Width: 1.87 metres
- Height: 2.58 metres
- Crew: 5
- Armor: 6 mm
- Main armament: 2x 7.7mm Vickers machine gun
- Engine: 4 cylinder gasoline (petrol); 50 hp
- Maximum speed: max 65 to 70 km/h

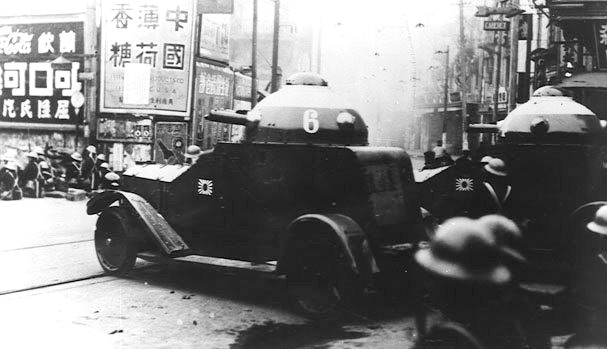
IJN Vickers Crossley armoured cars in China

The Vickers Crossley armoured car a/k/a Vickers-Crossley M25 armoured car was a British-made armoured car used by the British Army in India and exported to different countries, including Japan.

== History and design ==
The Model 25 armoured car was a British designed and manufactured military vehicle, which the British Army used in India. The Model 25 was also exported to different countries. The Imperial Japanese Army (IJA) saw a need for increased mechanization, and the Kwantung Army began to import foreign-built vehicles, including the Model 25. The Kwantung Army used them during the Mukden Incident (Manchurian Incident), which was a staged event engineered by Japanese military personnel as a pretext for the Japanese invasion in 1931 of northeastern China, known as Manchuria. The Manchukuo Imperial Army that was established by Imperial Japan in Manchuria, later received some Model 25s for use.

The Imperial Japanese Navy (IJN) imported the Model 25 during the early 1930s for use in China. The Model 25 was used specially by the Special Naval Landing Forces during the hostilities between Japanese military and the Chinese 19th Route Army in what became known as the January 28 incident or Shanghai Incident in 1932. The armoured cars were imported to strengthen the Japanese forces in and around the urban city and port area.

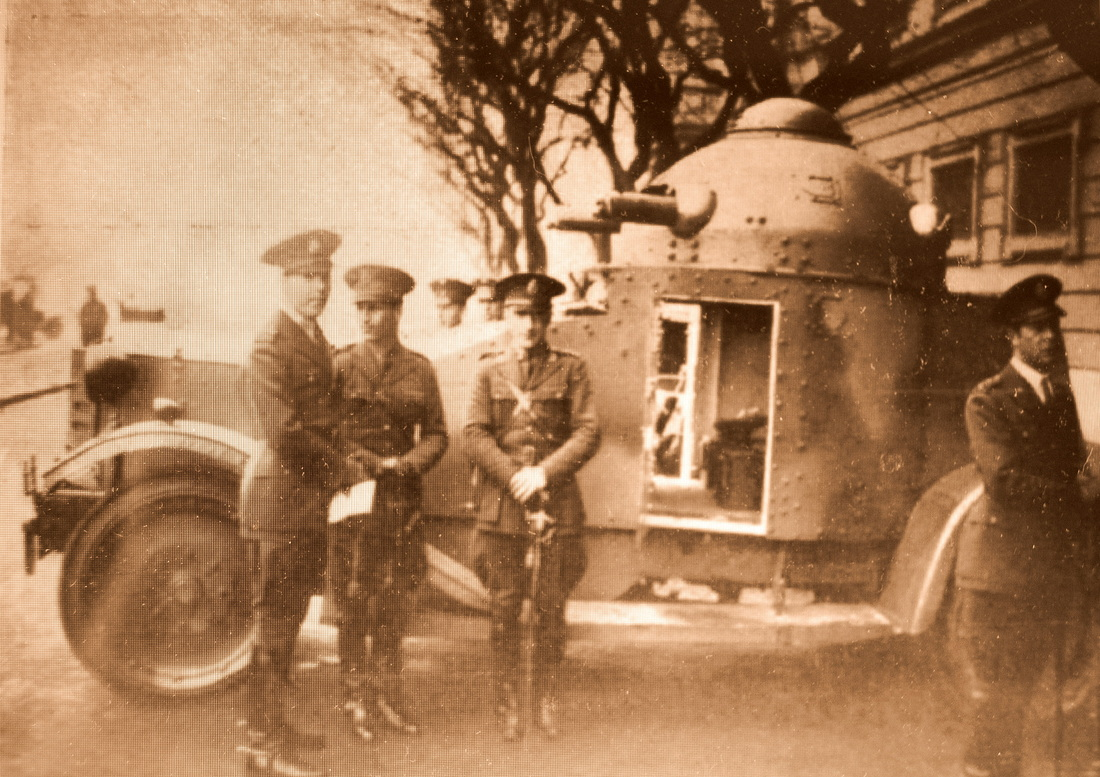
Argentine Model 26 armoured car

The Argentine Regiment of Mounted Grenadiers received 6 Vickers-Crossley Model 26 armoured cars in 1928. Derived from the British Indian Army cars, they had 2 axles instead of 3. They saw action during the 1930 Argentine coup d'état and some are later used by the Argentine Federal Police.

The vehicle used riveted and welded armor with a thickness of 6 mm. It had a hemispherical turret, which mounted twin 7.7 mm water-cooled Vickers machine guns with a domed cupola. The engine produced 50 hp giving the vehicle a top speed of 65 to 70 km/h.

== Users ==
- Argentina: used by the Mounted Grenadiers Regiment of the Argentine Army
- Japan: used by the Imperial Japanese Army and Imperial Japanese Navy.
- India
- Manchukuo
- United Kingdom
