= Type 92 heavy armoured car =

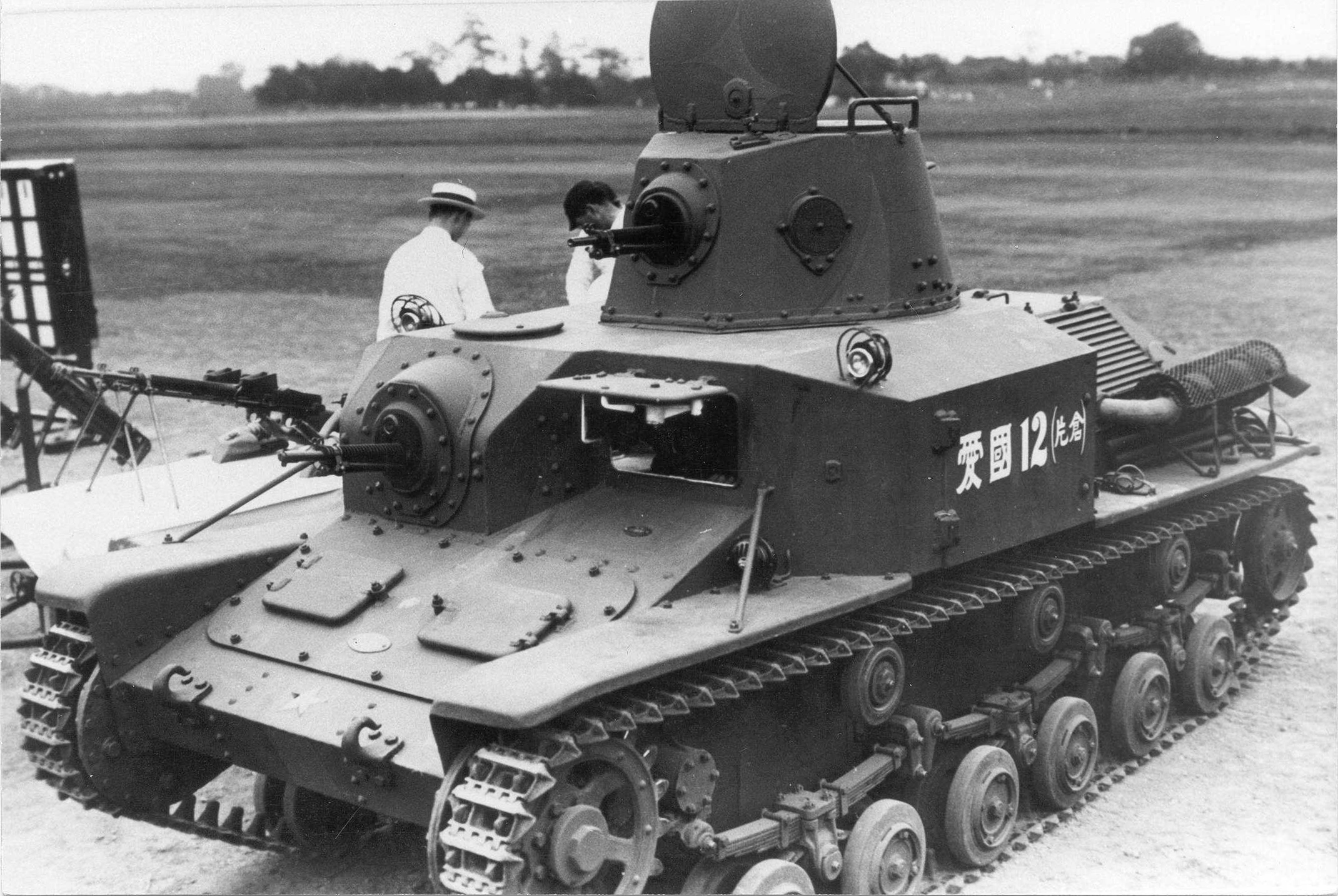
- Type 92 tankette in 1935
- Place of origin: Empire of Japan

Production history
- Designed: 1932
- Manufacturer: Ishikawajima Motorcar Manufacturing Company
- Produced: 1933–1936
- No. built: 167

Specifications
- Mass: 3.5 tonnes (3.9 tons)
- Length: 3.95 m (13 ft 0 in)
- Width: 1.63 m (5 ft 4 in)
- Height: 1.86 m (6 ft 1 in)
- Crew: 3
- Armor: 6 mm
- Main armament: early version, 1 x 6.5 mm Type 91 machine gun mid and later versions, 1 x 13 mm Type 92 heavy machine gun
- Secondary armament: early and mid version, 1 x 6.5 mm Type 91 machine gun later version, 1 × 7.7 mm Type 97 light machine gun
- Engine: Franklin/Ishikawajima Sumida C6 air-cooled inline 6-cylinder gasoline 45 hp (34 kW)
- Suspension: leaf spring
- Operational range: 200 km (120 mi)
- Maximum speed: 40 km/h (25 mph)

The Type 92 heavy armoured car (九二式重装甲車, Kyū-ni-shiki Jū-sōkōsha), also known as the Type 92 cavalry tank, was the Empire of Japan's first indigenous tankette. Designed for use by the cavalry of the Imperial Japanese Army and manufactured by Ishikawajima Motorcar Manufacturing Company, the Type 92 was meant for scouting and infantry support. The Type 92 was thin armored and lightly armed. It was called a sōkōsha (armored car) in Japanese due to political sectionalism within the Japanese Army (tanks were controlled by the infantry, whereas the weapon was intended for the cavalry). The same device was used in America with the M1 combat car.

== Developmental history ==
After World War I, many European countries attempted to mechanize their cavalry. In parallel, Japanese cavalry experimented with a variety of armored cars with limited success. These wheeled armored cars were not suitable for most operations in Manchuria, due to the poor road conditions and severe winter climate. Japan's army (like the US, French, British and Russian armies) tried various methods to integrate modern armor into their traditional horse cavalry formations.

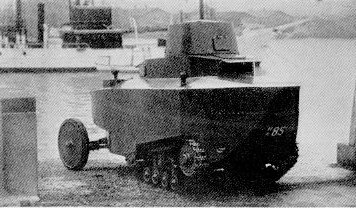
Experimental amphibious armored car Sumida AMP during testing, 1930

From the early 1920s, the Imperial Japanese Army Cavalry School based in Chiba prefecture tested a variety of European light tanks, including six Carden Loyd tankettes and several Renault FTs, and a decision was reached in 1929 to proceed with the domestic development of a new vehicle, based largely on the Carden Loyd design and intended to address the deficiencies of wheeled armored cars.

The development of the Type 92 began after the Japanese decided to develop a small vehicle in Japan for mobile operations. At first a hybrid amphibious car known as the Sumida amphibious armored car (AMP) was tested in 1930. It had both tracks and wheels and was able to drive in forward and reverse, both in the water and on land. The AMP prototype was not entirely successful, and the Japanese cavalry was not impressed with the performance. The cavalry wanted a vehicle with greater power and better off-road capabilities. After this, the amphibious car concept was abandoned, and the design was changed to a tracked vehicle for land use only.

The Ishikawajima Motorcar Manufacturing Company began work on the Type 92 prototype in March 1932 and it was completed the same year. After some initial problems with the running gear, the Type 92 proved well suited for the rough terrain and poor roads of Manchuria and China and was able to attain a speed of 40 km/h (25 mph). Some vehicles were equipped with two searchlights for night operations and Type 94 Mk 4 Otsu radios (this 1934 model had a range of 0.6 mile and weighed 88 lb; it used a 23 ft (7.0 m) long antenna of "reverse L" shape). The original leaf spring suspension with six road wheels and three return rollers caused ongoing problems and it was redesigned. The later production series had four road wheels and two return rollers. This later production version has sometime been mistakenly referred to as a "Type 93 light tank" or "Type 93 combat vehicle".

Production of the Type 92 was plagued by technical problems, including a poor suspension, and welding issues. Only a total of 167 units were built between 1933 and 1936. The Type 92 was eventually replaced by the Type 94 tankette during the Second Sino-Japanese War, although both British and American sources often confused the two models.

== Armor and armament ==
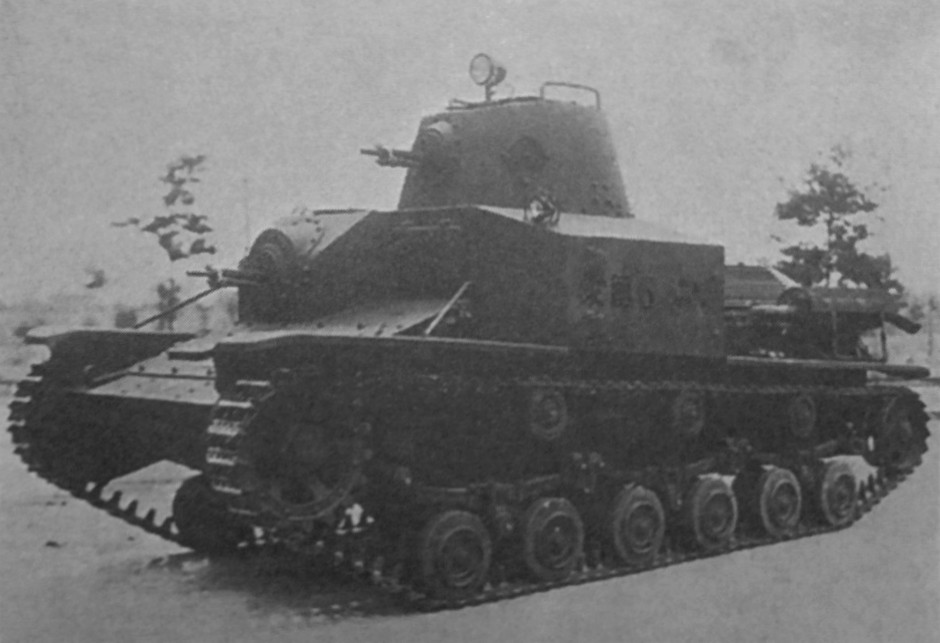
Type 92 tankette with early armament and earlier suspension of six road wheels and three return rollers

The Type 92 used riveted and welded armor with a maximum thickness of 6 mm in the hull and turret. The thin armor kept the weight to three tons; however, it could be penetrated by .30 and .50 caliber machine gun fire.

The armament consisted of two machine guns, one in the manually traversed turret and one in the hull. Early models had 6.5 mm Type 91 machine guns in both positions. Later, the hull-mounted weapon was replaced with a manually aimed 13 mm Type 92 heavy machine gun, license-built from Hotchkiss. The weapon had limited traverse, but included a pivoting eyepiece on the gunsight optics and a high-angle mount, allowing anti-aircraft use. The turret machine gun was later replaced by a 7.7 mm Type 97 light machine gun.

After production ended, efforts were made to improve the armament to keep the vehicle relevant on the battlefield. Attempts were also made in 1933 to mount a 37 mm tank gun in the hull of the vehicle to give it "anti-tank capabilities". It was determined to be "impractical" and therefore abandoned. The Type 98 20 mm machine cannon was successfully mounted on the hull of a number of the vehicles after 1937, in place of the 13.2 mm machine gun. In addition, an external anti-aircraft mount was stowed in the vehicle, which could be attached to the outer rear facing of the turret, allowing an additional 6.5 mm Type 91 machine gun to be mounted. The louvered engine hatches could be raised and locked together to form a seat for the gunner using the externally mounted machine gun.

== Variants ==
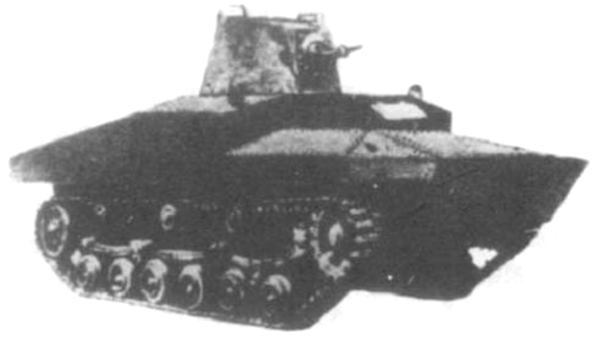
Experimental Type 92 A-I-Go (amphibious version)

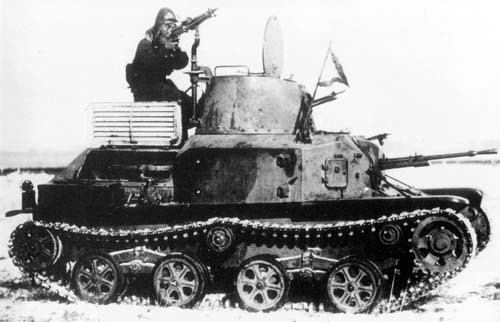
Late model Type 92 - new suspension with four road wheels and two return rollers

There were two early prototype models. The early wheeled prototype and the experimental amphibious version (Type 92 A-I-Go) with a watertight hull, floats and propellers (only 2 built) eventually resulted in the early production model with four bogie wheels, and three small return rollers each side. However, this model was superseded in production by an intermediate production model with six bogie wheels, and three small return rollers each side. A later version had an improved suspension with four larger bogie wheels, and two return rollers each side, when combat experience showed that the earlier Type 92 tended to throw its tracks in high speed turns.

There were several major production variants. A Type 92 first production "early" model. Initial armament was two light 6.5 mm Type 91 machine guns, with one mounted in the turret and one in the hull.

The re-armed or "mid" production Type 92 included the hull mounted 13.2 mm heavy machine gun. The first Special Tank Company of the 8th Division used it in the battle of Rehe, March 1933. The mid-production re-armed model allowed for some anti-air capability, increasing the utility of the vehicle.

The "late" Type 92 was deployed in Manchuria, April 1942. Modifications included a new drive train, new redesigned portholes and vision slits with different swing. It continued to mount a 13.2 mm heavy machine gun in the hull.

== Combat use ==
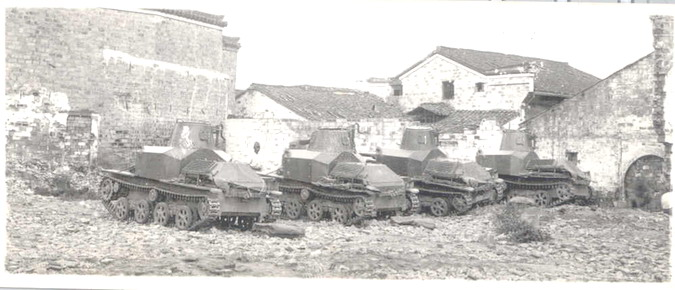
Type 92s at Wanshi Chin near Nanking in 1941

The Type 92 tankette was deployed primarily with the Kwantung Army in Manchuria and the Chosen Army in Korea. The Manchukuo Imperial Army also received 30 Type 92s.

The Type 92 saw combat in China and Manchuria during the Second Sino-Japanese War, including the Battle of Rehe with the 1st Special Tank Company of the 8th Division.
