= Tanks of Japan =

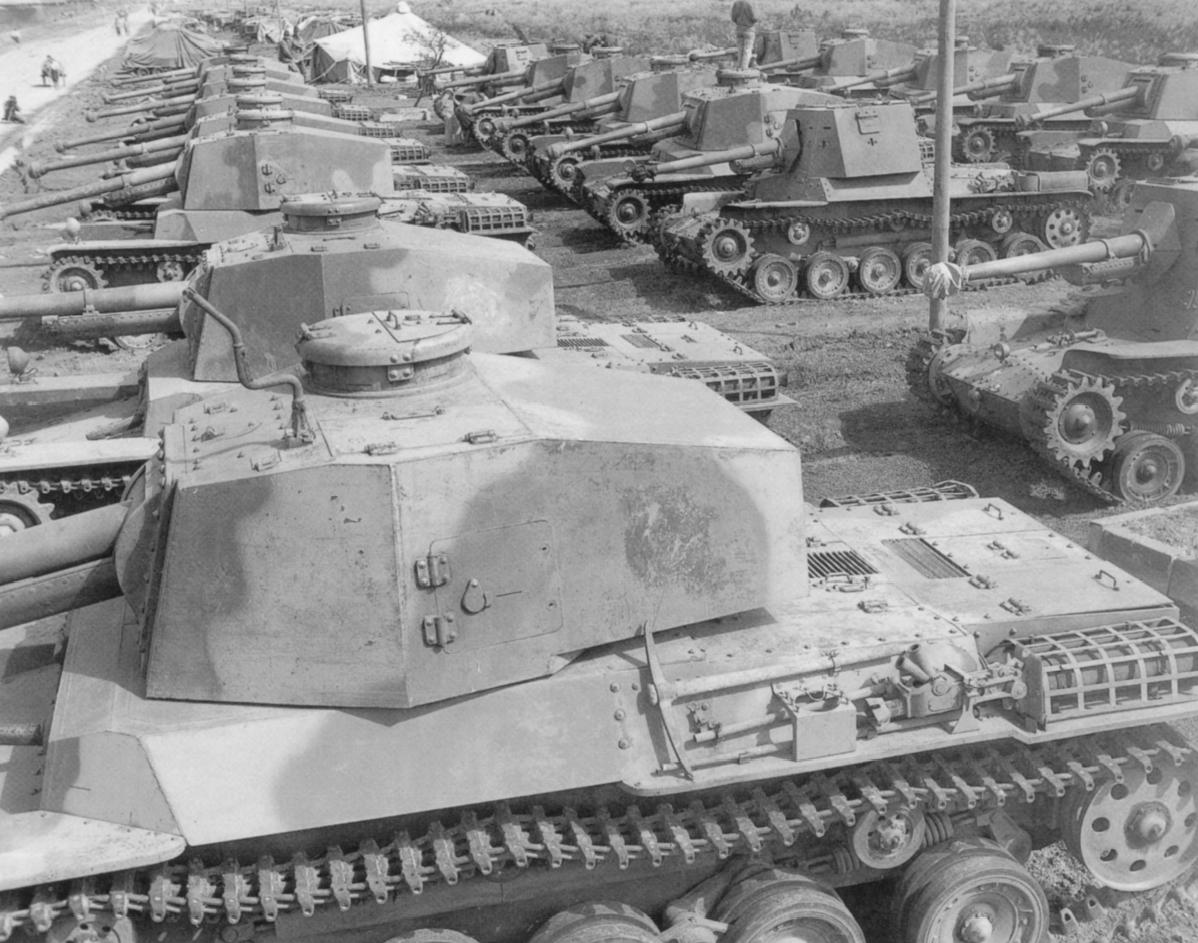
IJA 4th Armored Division with Type 3 Chi-Nu tanks and Type 3 Ho-Ni III tank destroyers

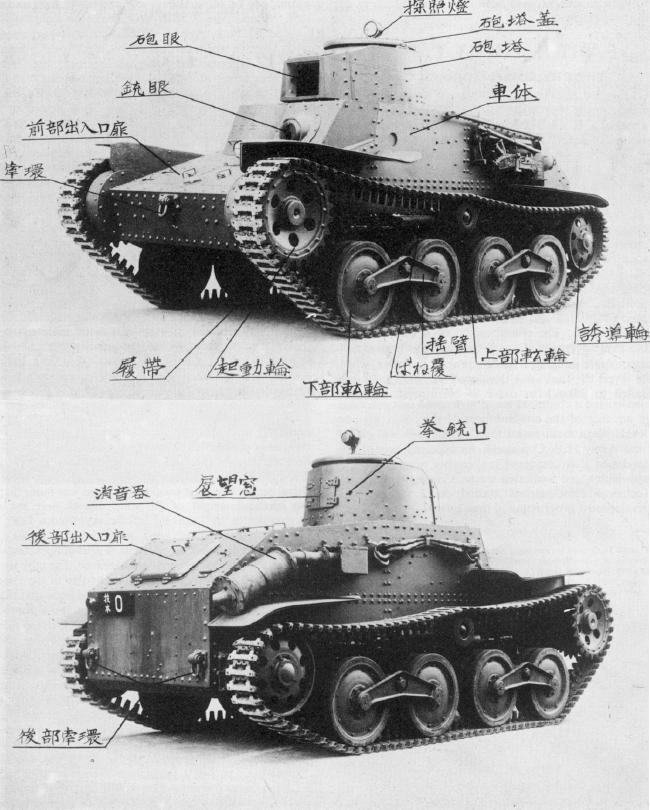
Japanese Type 95 Ha-Go first prototype, 1934

This article deals with the history and development of tanks of the Japanese Army from their first use after World War I, into the interwar period, during World War II, the Cold War and modern era.

== Overview ==
The validity of the tank concept was established during World War I. After the war, many nations needed to have tanks, but only a few had the industrial resources to design and build them. During and after World War I, Britain and France were the intellectual leaders in tank design, with other countries generally following and adopting their designs. Japan took interest in tanks and procured some of the foreign designs, and then went to build its own. Many Japanese designs were of tankettes and light tanks, for use in campaigns in Manchuria and elsewhere in China. During the mid-1930s, the "tank actions" there were mainly against opposing infantry as the Chinese National Revolutionary Army had only three tank battalions consisting of Vickers export tanks, German PzKpfw I light tanks, and Italian CV33 tankettes. Aside from the invasion of Malaya, and the Philippines, large-scale Japanese use of tanks was limited during the early years of the war and therefore development of newer designs were not given high priority as the Japanese strategy shifted to a "defensive orientation" after the 1941-42 victories. Armored vehicle development and fielding suffered as a result; a shift to designs with heavier armor and larger guns to fight against the larger tanks of the Allies came too late for the Japanese to field superior tanks on the battlefield.

After World War II, the Supreme Commander of the Allied Powers dismantled all military manufacturing and development facilities in Japan, causing Japan to lose the technology base required to manufacture tanks and armored vehicles. However, due to the outbreak of the Korean War, SCAP ordered Japan to re-militarize, forming the Japanese Ground-Self Defense Force and providing M4A3E8 Sherman and M24 Chaffee tanks (an initial plan to provide M26 Pershings was abandoned in the face of State Department opposition). For various reasons, including obsolescence of the tanks in JGSDF service at the time, the JGSDF in 1954 was given the option to either purchase new American built M46 Pattons and later the M47 Patton or develop its own Main Battle Tank (MBT). The JGSDF decided to develop its own tank, which resulted in the development of the current range of modern Japanese tanks built by Mitsubishi Heavy Industries.

== Naming system ==
Like all weapons, the year of introduction is the first criterion. A tank's designation contains the last two digits of the Japanese imperial year, which has its origin at 660 BC. For example, the designation "Type 89" corresponds to imperial year 2589, which is 1929 in the Gregorian calendar.

However, several weapons, including tanks, might be introduced in any given year. The Japanese used ideograms to differentiate further the various weapons. The first ideogram indicated the category of the vehicle. It was a katakana syllable that corresponded to the first syllable of the category. Thus, the katakana syllable ke (ケ) stood for a light tank, as it is the first syllable of the corresponding Japanese term, keisensha (軽戦車). Analogously, chi (チ) meant a medium tank, te-ke (テケ) a tankette, ho (ホ) a self-propelled gun, and ka (カ) an amphibious tank.

| Abbreviation | Long form | Meaning |
|---|---|---|
| chi (チ) | chūsensha (中戦車) | medium tank |
| ke (ケ) | keisensha (軽戦車) | light tank |
| ho (ホ) | hōsensha (砲戦車) | gun tank |
| ka (カ) | suiriku ryōyō sensha (水陸両用戦車) | amphibious tank |
| te-ke (テケ) = TK | tokushu ken'insha (特殊牽引車), see Type 94 tankette | tankette |
| o (オ) | ō (大, big) standing for chōjū sensha (超重戦車) | super-heavy tank |

There was a second ideogram to distinguish the models. This character is another katakana syllable that represents an ordering according to the Iroha sequence and can be thought of as a, b, c, … or first, second, third, and so on.

For example, the Type 97 Chi-Ha medium tank was introduced in 1937 and the third medium tank, the Type 2 Ke-To was a light tank introduced in 1942 and the seventh light tank. There is sometimes a surname to supplement or replace the ideograms. The Type 97 ShinHōtō Chi-Ha medium tank was a variation of the medium tank Chi-Ha with a new turret (新砲塔, shin hōtō). The Type 95 light tank had the surname ha-gō (ハ号, third model) that was given by its designer, Mitsubishi Heavy Industries.

== Post World War I tank designs ==
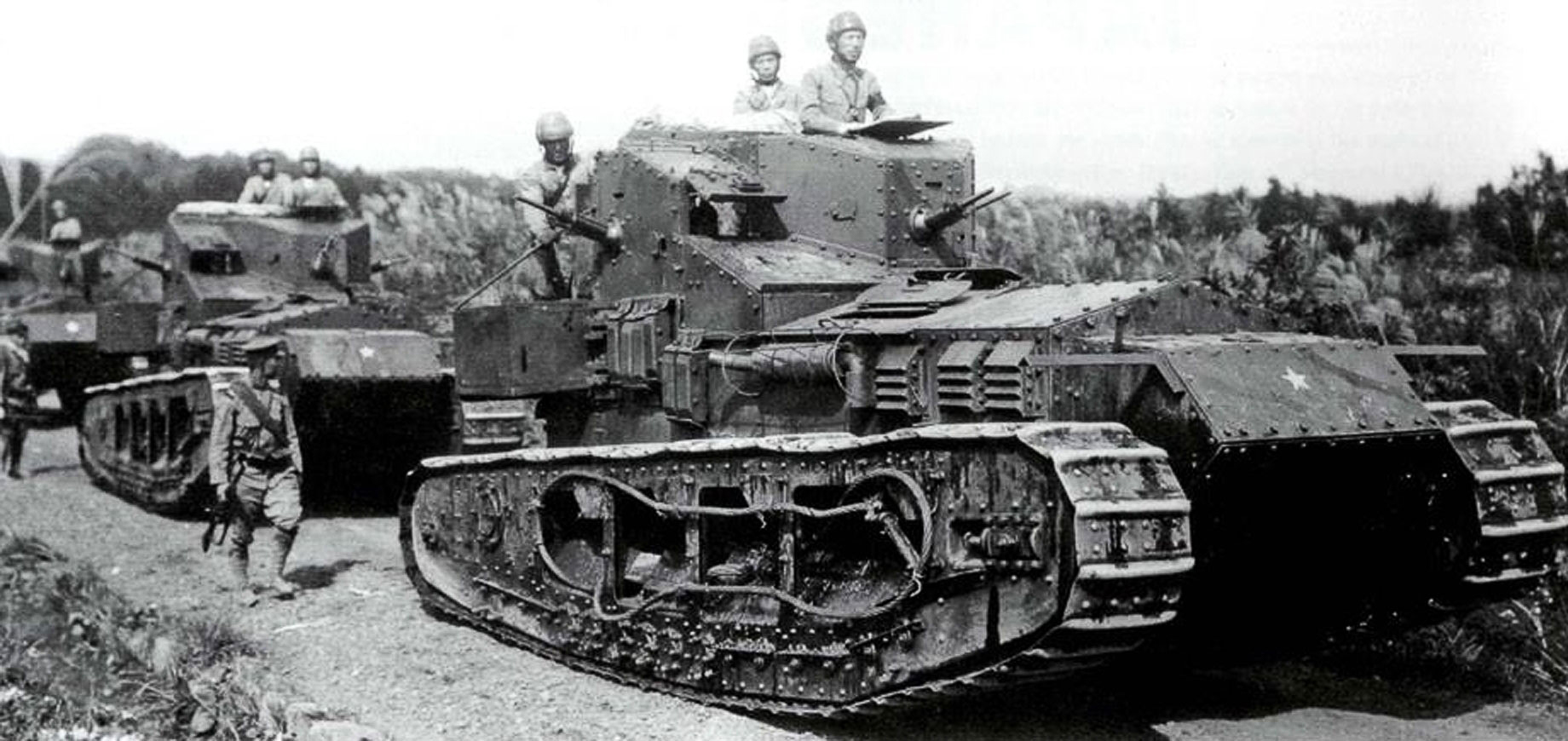
Japanese Whippets

After World War I ended, many European countries attempted to mechanize their cavalry. The Japanese cavalry experimented with a variety of armored cars with limited success. These wheeled armored cars were not suitable for most operations in Manchuria, due to the poor road conditions and severe winter climate. Japan's army (like the US, French, British and Russian armies) tried various methods to integrate modern armor into their traditional horse cavalry formations.

The Imperial Japanese Army obtained a variety of models from foreign sources as Japan did not have any indigenous tank production capability at that time. These models included one British Heavy Mk IV and six Medium Mark A Whippets, along with thirteen French Renault FTs, the latter subsequently designated Renault Ko-Gata Sensha (ルノー甲型戦車, "Renault A-type tank"). The Mk IV tank was purchased in October 1918 while the Whippets and Renaults were acquired in 1919.

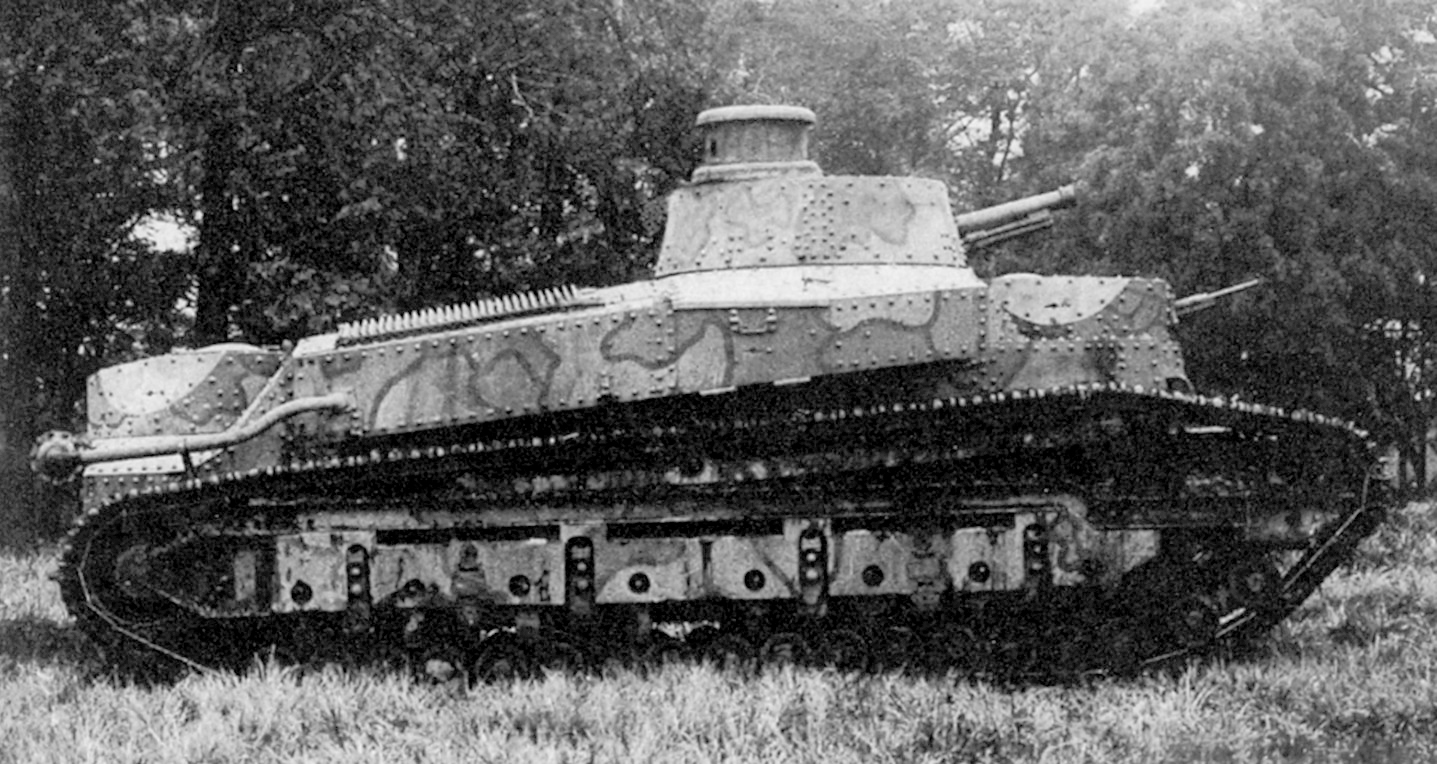
Experimental tank No.1 (Type 87 Chi-I)

The Imperial Japanese Army established an armored force in 1925. Building tanks of their own met several problems, as Japan's priority tended to be with naval procurements so production for tank steel was on a lower level. Development of the first Japanese-designed tank began in June 1925. A small team of engineers participated in the development of the medium main battle tank, including a young officer, Major Tomio Hara. Hara went on to become the head of the tank development department. The design was finished in May 1926 and the prototype was completed by February 1927. After trials, the IJA decided the Type 87 Chi-I (Experimental tank number 1) was too heavy at 20 tons and too slow to be used as its main battle tank. When the design was rejected, a new requirement was issued for a lighter tank with a nominal 10-short-ton (9.1-metric-ton) weight. The new design was modeled after the Vickers Medium C, which had been bought by the IJA in March 1927. By 1929, the prototype of the Type 89 Chi-Ro (Experimental tank number 2) was completed. As a result of trials, in 1929 the Japanese decided to develop a small vehicle for mobile operations.

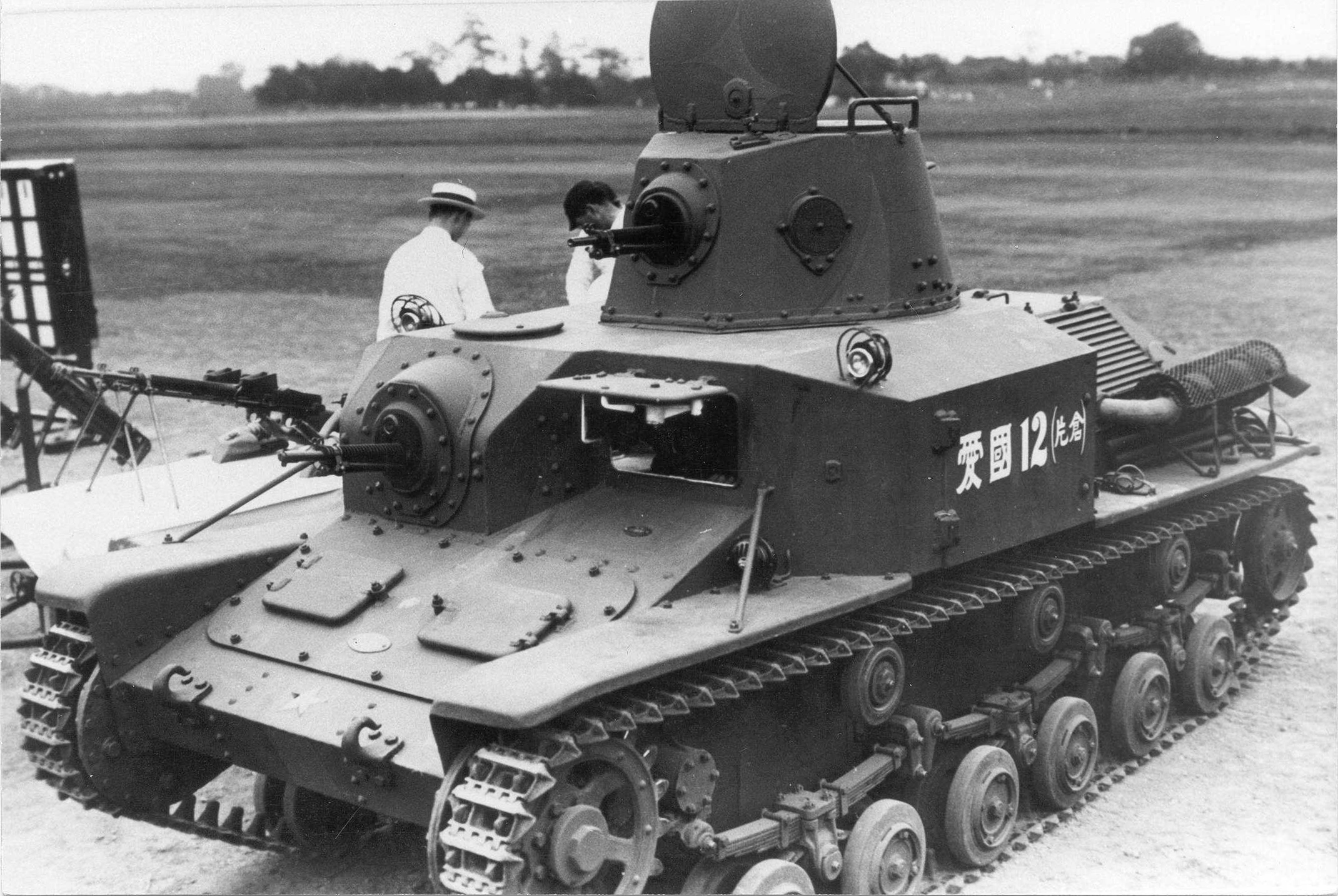
Type 92 tankette

Since its indigenous tank program was still in the prototype stage, in 1930 the Imperial Japanese Army purchased replacements for the Renault FTs; from France, they acquired 10 of the Renault NC1, designated Renault Otsu-Gata Sensha (ルノー乙型戦車, "Renault B-type tank"). The army also purchased several Vickers 6-ton tanks and six Carden Loyd tankettes from the British and used these as a basis for further development.

At first, an indigenous hybrid amphibious car known as the Sumida amphibious armored car (AMP) was tested in 1930. It had both tracks and wheels and was able to drive in forward and reverse, both in the water and on land. Japanese cavalry officers were not impressed with the performance, so the amphibious car concept was abandoned. The design was changed to a land tracked vehicle only.

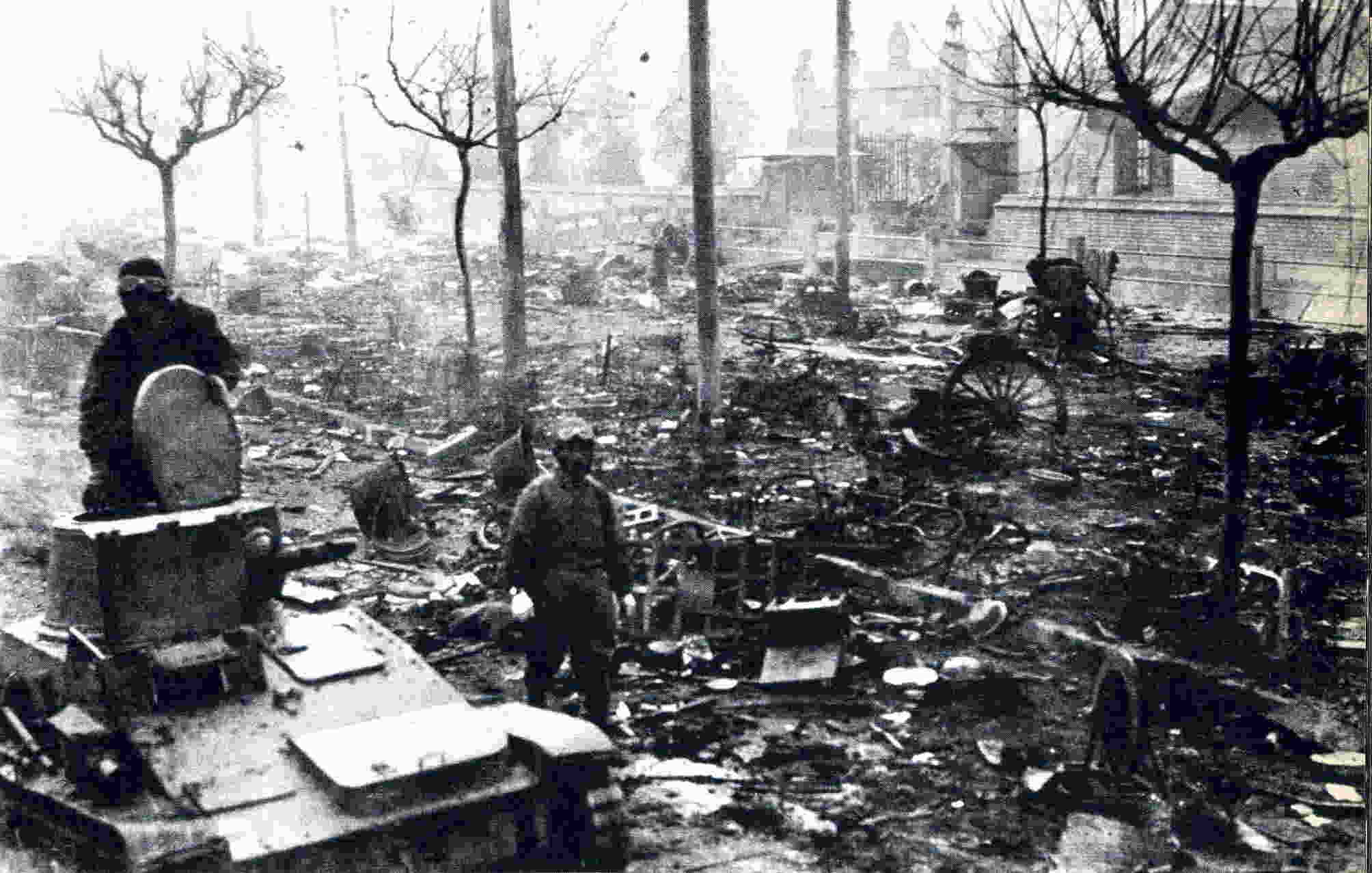
Japanese tankettes in China at the attack on Nanking.

The initial attempt at a tracked vehicle resulted in the Type 92 Jyu-Sokosha heavy armoured car by Ishikawajima Motorcar Manufacturing Company (Isuzu Motors). The Type 92 was designed for use by the cavalry for reconnaissance and infantry support. Production of this first indigenous tankette was plagued by technical problems.

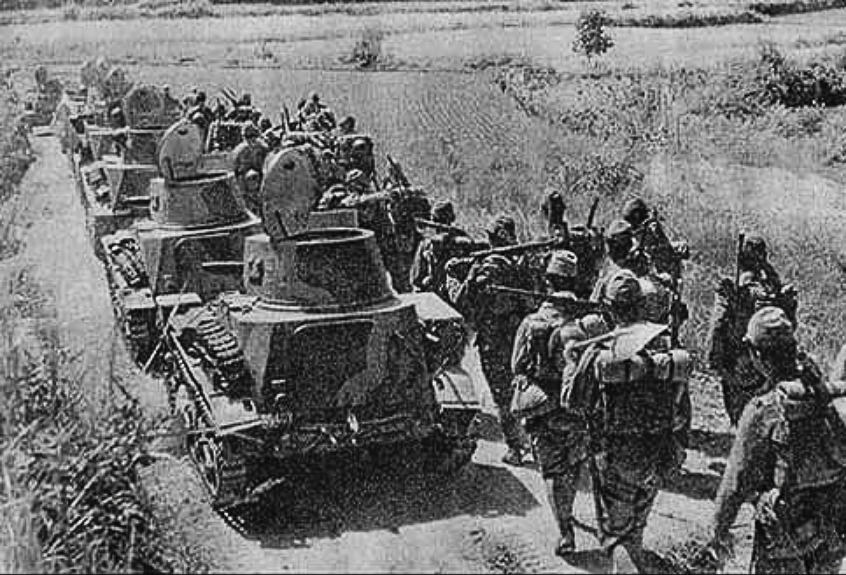
Japanese tankettes in China at the attack on Wuhan

The IJA determined that a new tankette was needed, so in 1933 development of the project was given to Tokyo Gas and Electric Industry (later known as Hino Motors). The completed 1934 experimental model was a small light tracked vehicle with a turret armed with one machine gun. The design was standardized as the Type 94 tankette, and it was designated for reconnaissance and infantry support. It entered service in 1935, but was later superseded by the Type 97 tankette. Both were "tailored" vehicles for operating in China. There the ultra-light tankettes, with weak armament and armor but highly mobile, proved very successful in infantry support and reconnaissance. However, by the late thirties, it became clear that these types of vehicles would not be very useful against a more serious armed enemy. The development of tankettes was stopped.

By 1932, Mitsubishi Heavy Industries was producing an air-cooled diesel engine that was suitable for tanks. It was placed experimentally into a Type 89. This later became known as the Type 89-B medium tank. Subsequently, Major Tomio Hara designed the suspension system, which was used on many future Japanese tanks. The bell crank scissors suspension paired bogie wheels connected by a coil spring mounted horizontally outside the hull.

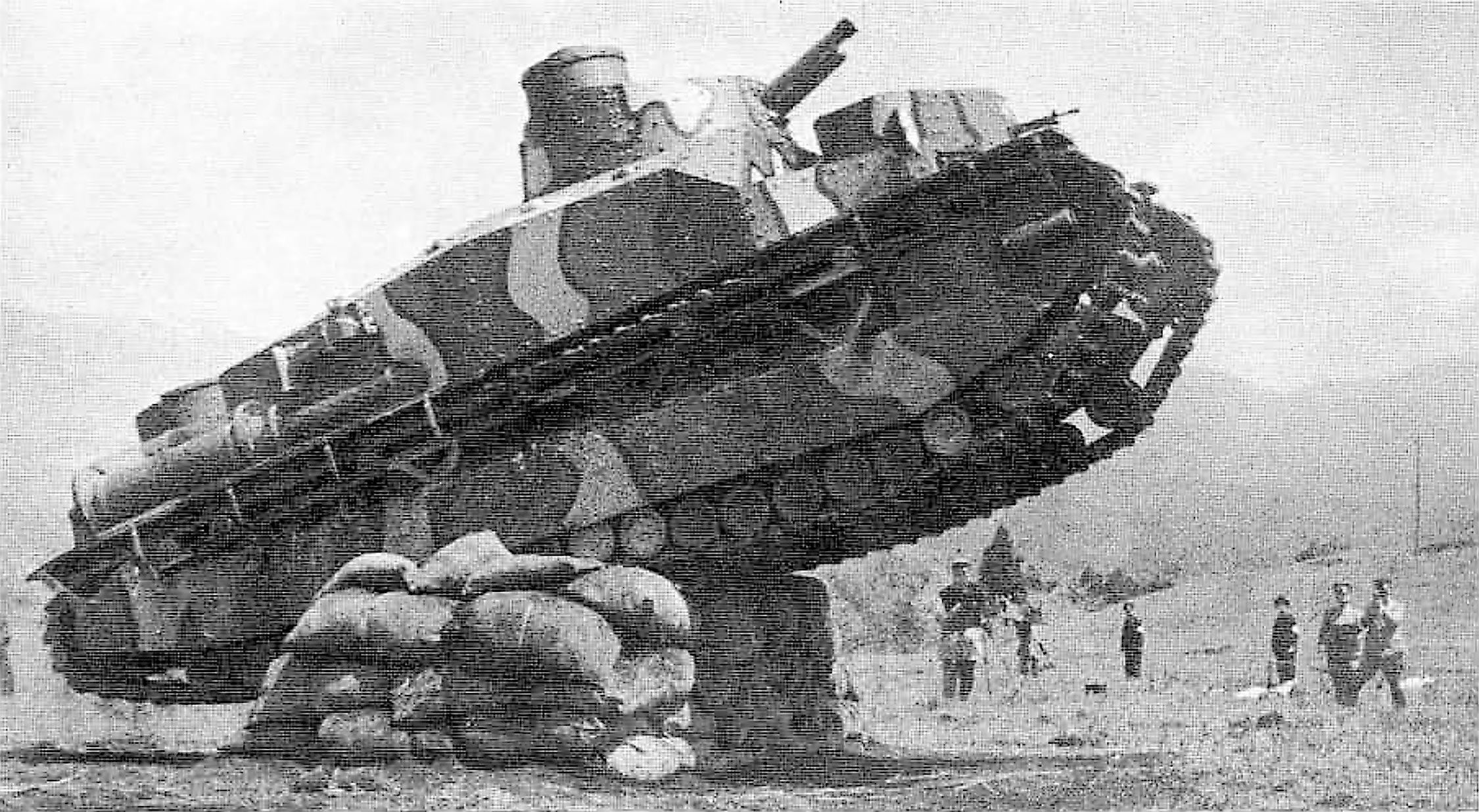
Experimental Type 91 heavy tank, climbing an obstacle

Japan built the Type 95 heavy tank in 1934, which was the final version of the Japanese multi-turreted designs that had started back in 1931 with the prototype 18-ton Type 91 heavy tank. Modeled from German, Italian, and Soviet tank designs, the Type 95 featured three turrets; the main armament being a 70 mm cannon with a 6.5 mm machine gun also mounted in the main turret. The two additional turrets gave the Type 95 more firepower: one Type 94 3.7 cm tank cannon was mounted in one auxiliary turret, and the second auxiliary turret featured a 6.5 mm machine gun. Four prototypes were completed before the project was cancelled.

In the meantime, a new light tank known as the Type 95 Ha-Go was produced. Introduced in 1936, it would go on to be produced in greater numbers than any other Japanese tank. It was by no means a bad design, but its popularity among the crews delayed by a couple of years the introduction of a follower. It was already outdated in 1941. The two models that replaced it after 1942 (the Type 98 Ke-Ni and the Type 2 Ke-To) did address the shortcoming of the Type 95, but were still insufficient. A new follower, the Type 5 Ke-Ho would not go further than testing in 1945.

In the field of amphibious tanks, the Japanese proved more creative. The army built several prototypes before the war, but the whole enterprise was dropped by 1940. The Imperial Japanese Navy took over development of amphibious vehicles and in 1941 came up with the Type 2 Ka-Mi, followed in 1943 by the larger Type 3 Ka-Chi. They were adaptations of land tanks on which detachable bows and sterns were added to provide flotation. They did not play a significant role in combat. Still, in their tank programs the Japanese introduced innovations as they built their designs, including bell crank suspensions, as pioneers in amphibious tanks, and the use of diesel engines as they were less likely to catch on fire versus the regular gas engines.

== World War II ==
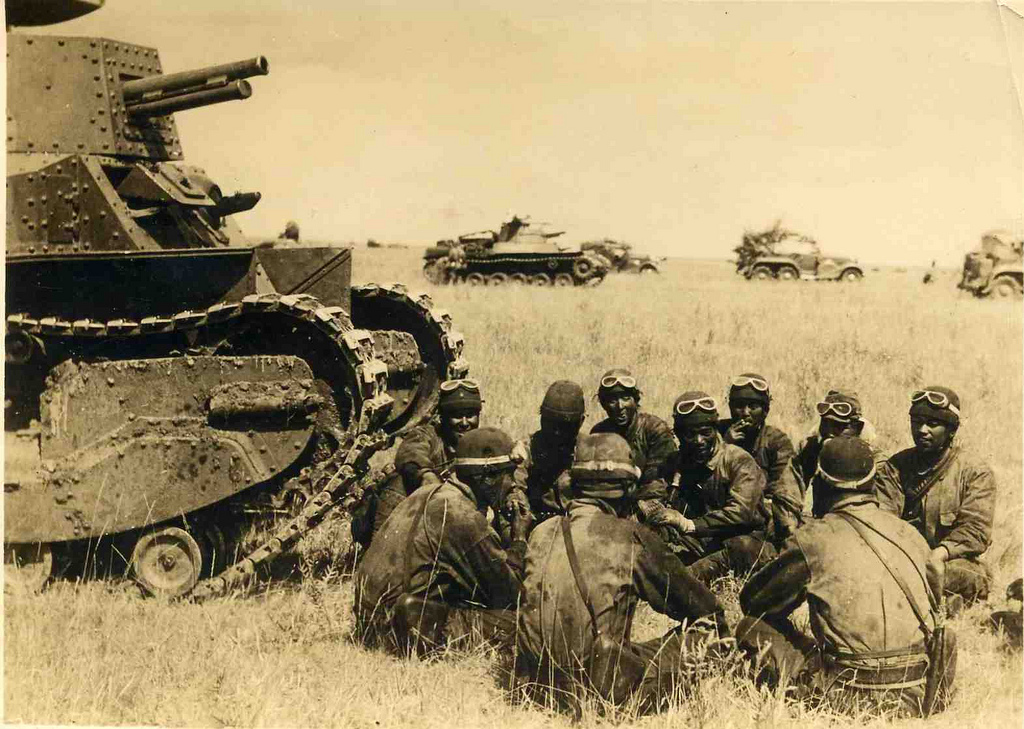
Type 89 prior to the Battle of Khalkhin Gol

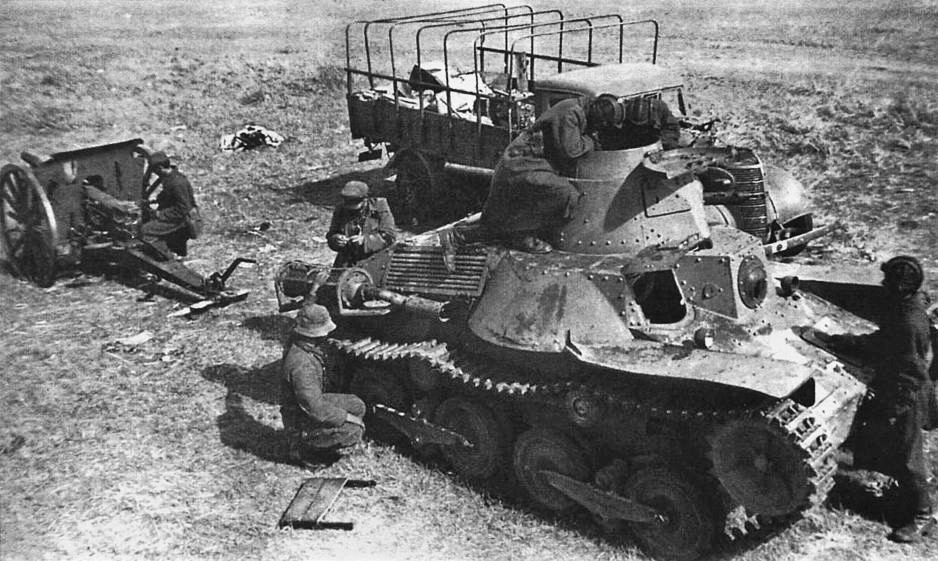
Japanese tank Type 95 Ha-Go captured by Soviet troops after battle of Khalkhin Gol

The Japanese generals had made a mistake in their assessment of the tanks used against China, a country whose army had few tanks or antitank weapons. By 1937, Japan fielded 1,060 tanks in 8 regiments, but most were designed for and used in an infantry support role. However, tanks built for this role left the IJA without a tank capable of tank-vs-tank combat, a deficiency that was brought home hard at the Battles of Khalkhin Gol, a terrible defeat inflicted by the Soviet Red Army on the Mongolian border in 1939.

During the battles of Khalkhin Gol, the Japanese Army's 1st Tank Corps (Yasuoka Detachment) consisted of the 3rd Tank Regiment and 4th Tank Regiment. The 3rd Tank Regiment consisted of 26 Type 89Bs, four Type 97 medium tanks, seven Type 94 tankettes, and four Type 97 Te-Ke tankettes, and the 4th Tank Regiment contained 35 Type 95s, eight Type 89As, and three Type 94 tankettes. In addition, the IJA infantry and cavalry units had approximately 50 tankettes and armored cars. In this battle, the IJA 1st Tank Corps launched an offensive in July against the Soviet Union's 11th Tank and 7th Armored brigades and suffered heavy losses. After four days of combat, the 1st Tank Corps lost 42 tanks. In the ensuing Soviet counteroffensive in late August, armored units of the Red Army swept around the flanks and attacked the Japanese forces in the rear, achieving a classic double envelopment. By 31 August, Japanese forces on the Mongolian side of the border were destroyed.

The battles of Khalkhin Gol resulted in defeat for the Japanese Sixth Army, and prompted the Imperial Japanese Army to rethink tactics and formations of armored units along with tank design. Armored production was ramped up from 500 tanks per year to 1,200; the Japanese decided they needed a better tank gun and developed the 47 mm Type 1 gun in response to the Soviet 45 mm guns encountered in combat in 1939. This was mounted into the Type 97 and designated the Type 97-Kai a/k/a Type 97 Shinhoto Chi-Ha.

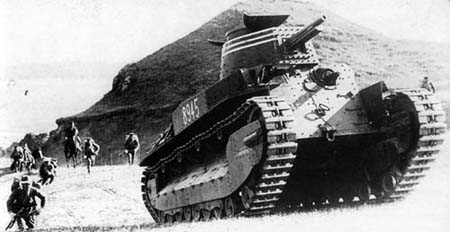
Type 89B Otsu in the field

From 1932 onwards, the Type 89 Chi-Ro had been the first Japanese tank to be mass-produced. It remained the standard medium tank until the late thirties. It was outdated before that time. Its follower, the Type 97 Chi-Ha took over and remained the standard model type used until the end of the war in 1945. Its shortcomings were clear since the Battle of Khalkhin Gol in 1939 though. The Shinhoto Chi-Ha, the same Type 97 hull with a new turret to install a better gun appeared only in 1942. While vulnerable to opposing Allied tanks (US M3 Lee/British M3 Grant, M4 Sherman and Soviet T-34), the 47 mm high-velocity gun did give the Shinhoto Chi-Ha some fighting chance against them. The 47 mm gun was effective against light tanks and against the sides and rear of the Sherman tank. The Japanese designed additional improved models, but tanks such as the Type 1 Chi-He or the Type 3 Chi-Nu ended up only being produced in limited numbers.

With the German armor led victories in Europe in 1940, the Japanese changed their deployment and doctrine and organized tank divisions. By 1940 they were the fifth largest tank force in the world behind the Soviet Union, France, Britain and Germany, but were behind in medium and heavy tanks. However, after 1941 the Japanese focused their industry on building warships and aircraft after the attack on Pearl Harbor brought the United States into the conflict, as priorities shifted to warships and aircraft, weapons that were more conducive to naval warfare; attacking across the Pacific, and defending the Empire from the advancing American naval fleet.

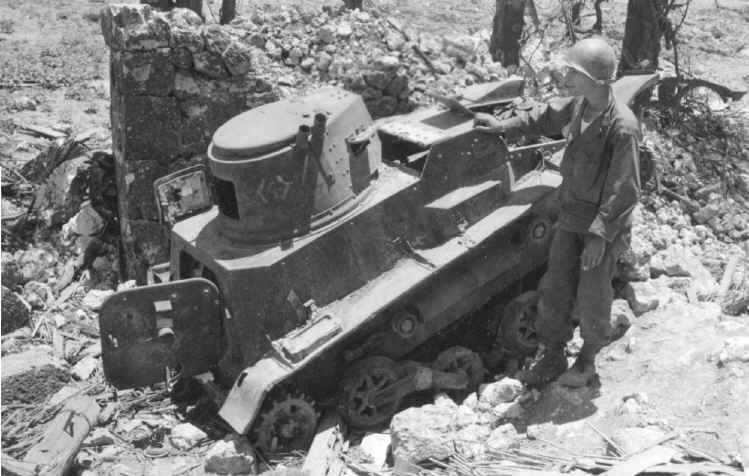
Type 94 tankette captured at the Battle of Okinawa

So, although the Japanese Army widely employed tanks within the Pacific theater of war, the tanks that Allied forces in the Pacific faced were mostly older designs or even obsolete as the most modern Japanese tanks, such as the Type 3 Chi-Nu, were delayed by material and production shortages. Even after they started to come out of the factories the idea was to hold them for the defense of the mainland, and not dispersed to the far flung army or navy forces. Between 1931 and 1945, Japan produced 6450 tanks. Half of them (3,300) were made by the Mitsubishi Company. The sub-total of tanks produced between 1940 and 1945 is 4424, i.e. a yearly average comparable to Italy. For a country as large and as industrialized as Japan, that is modest. This being due to the higher priority of steel allocated to the Imperial Navy for warship construction. It changed to a degree in 1944/45, when the homeland became increasingly under direct threat but it was too late. As with many innovative weapons projects launched by Japan in the final years of World War II, production could not advance beyond either small numbers or the prototype stage due to material shortages, and the loss of Japan's industrial infrastructure to the Allied bombing of Japan.

== Post World War II ==
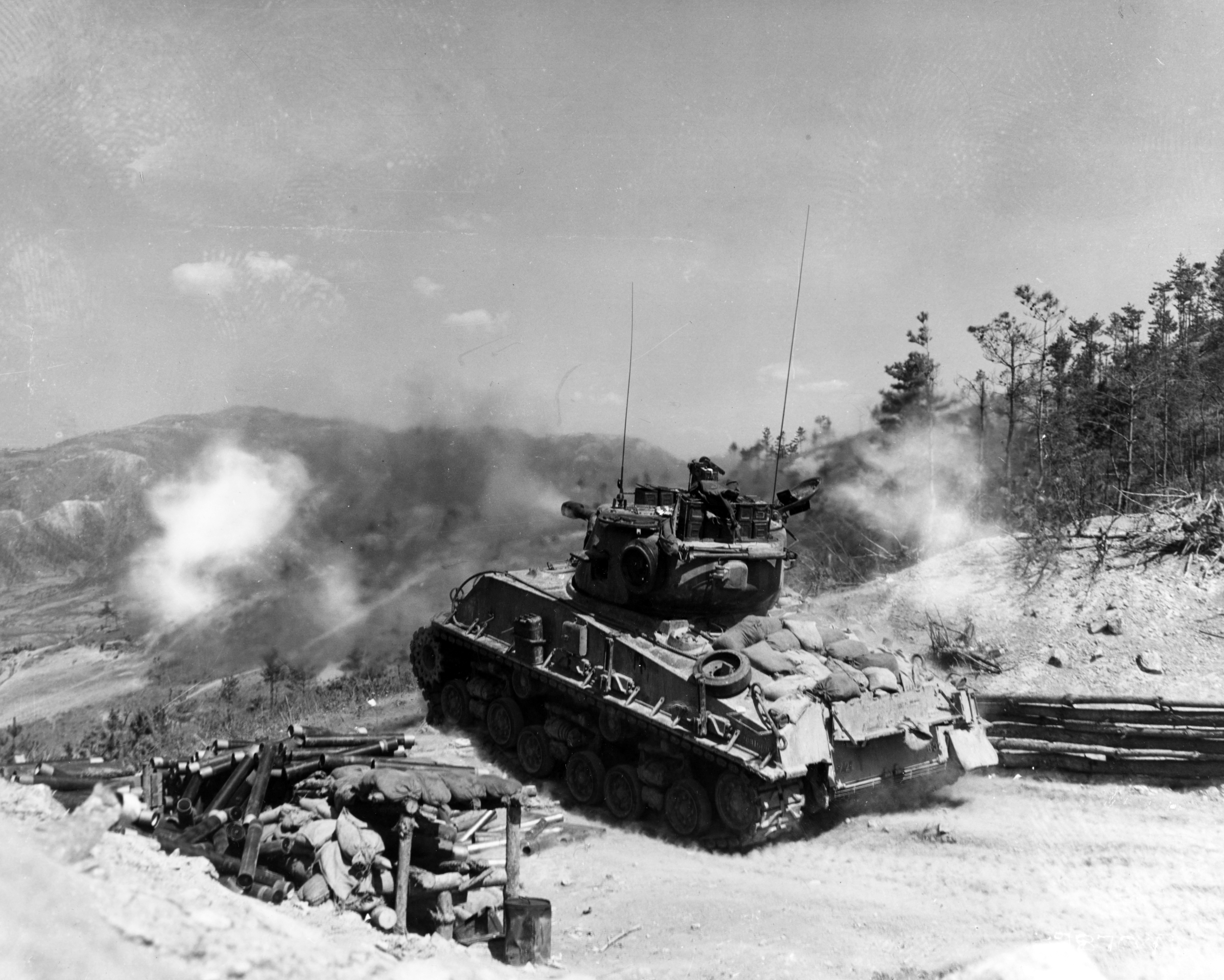
A M4A3E8 model of Sherman tank such as was provided to JGSDF

After World War II, Supreme Commander of the Allied Powers (A.K.A. GHQ in Japan) ceased all military manufacturing and development plants in Japan, making the country lose the technology to build and manufacture tanks and armoured vehicles. Then due to the Korean War, the Supreme Commander of the Allied Powers ordered Japan to re-militarize, forming armed police forces (National police reserve, later called National security force, then finally Japan ground self-defence force) and provided M4A3E8 Sherman and M24 Chaffee tanks.

The M24, though it was popular amongst the Japanese crews, was inadequate when facing Soviet T-34/85s, as seen in Korea. Thus, as the tanks in the Japan ground self-defence force (JGSDF) service at the time were obsolete/inadequate, the JGSDF was provided with the option of either purchasing the new American built M46 Patton and, later, the M47 Patton or develop their own MBT in 1954. Due to the high cost of purchasing American made tanks, and because the M47 did not meet their requirements, the JGSDF decided on developing their own main battle tank, resulting in the development of the Type 61 tank.

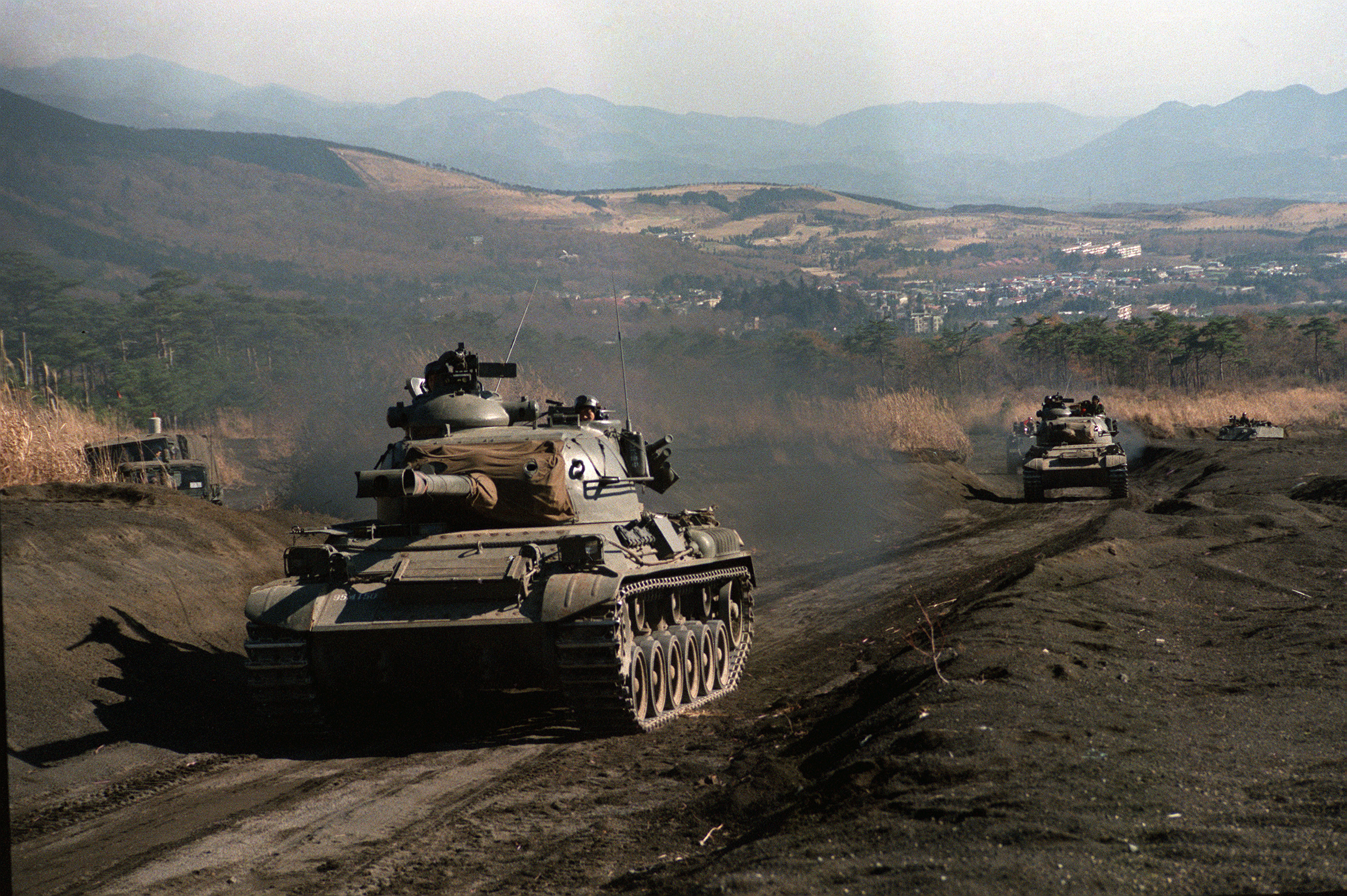
Type 61 tanks on the move at Camp Fuji, Shizuoka Prefecture as part of a joint US/Japanese exercise

The first prototype vehicles, STA-1 and STA-2 were built and tested by 1957. The results were used to develop the STA-3 and STA-4. More improvements were made in 1961 and the deployment of the Type 61 began. The initial production rate was low, with only ten tanks produced in 1962, increasing to twenty in 1964 and thirty in 1965 and 1966. A total of 250 had been produced by 1970, with production continuing at an increased pace until 1975 when it was terminated. A total of 560 were produced. The main gun of the Type 61 was unstabilized, so firing on the move was impractical, and the vehicle is not fitted with an NBC protection system or deep wading equipment. The JGSDF started studies on a new tank design with Mitsubishi in 1962, as it was realized that the Type 61 would not be able to defeat the latest Soviet designs like the T-62. The tanks were phased out of service in the 1990s with 400 in service in 1990, and 190 in service in 1995. All were decommissioned by 2000, 39 years after their original deployment. From 1980, Type 61's began to be supplemented by the more modern Type 74 MBT.

The first prototype of the Type 74 MBT, designated STB-1, was delivered in late 1968 and underwent a number of modifications until the final prototype designated STB-6 was delivered in 1973. Production finally started as the Type 74 in September 1975, with 225 being delivered by January 1980. Production ended in 1989, with total production running to 893 examples. The gunner's position included a digital fire control computer, fed range data from the commander's range finder. Rounds for the main gun were upgraded from HEP to APFSDS and HEAT-MP.

After the adoption of the Type 74, the Japanese High Command was already looking for a superior, completely indigenous tank design to defeat the Soviet T-72. As a result, development of a prototype as a replacement for the Type 74, the TK-X MBT began between 1976 and 1977, which became the Type 90 tank.

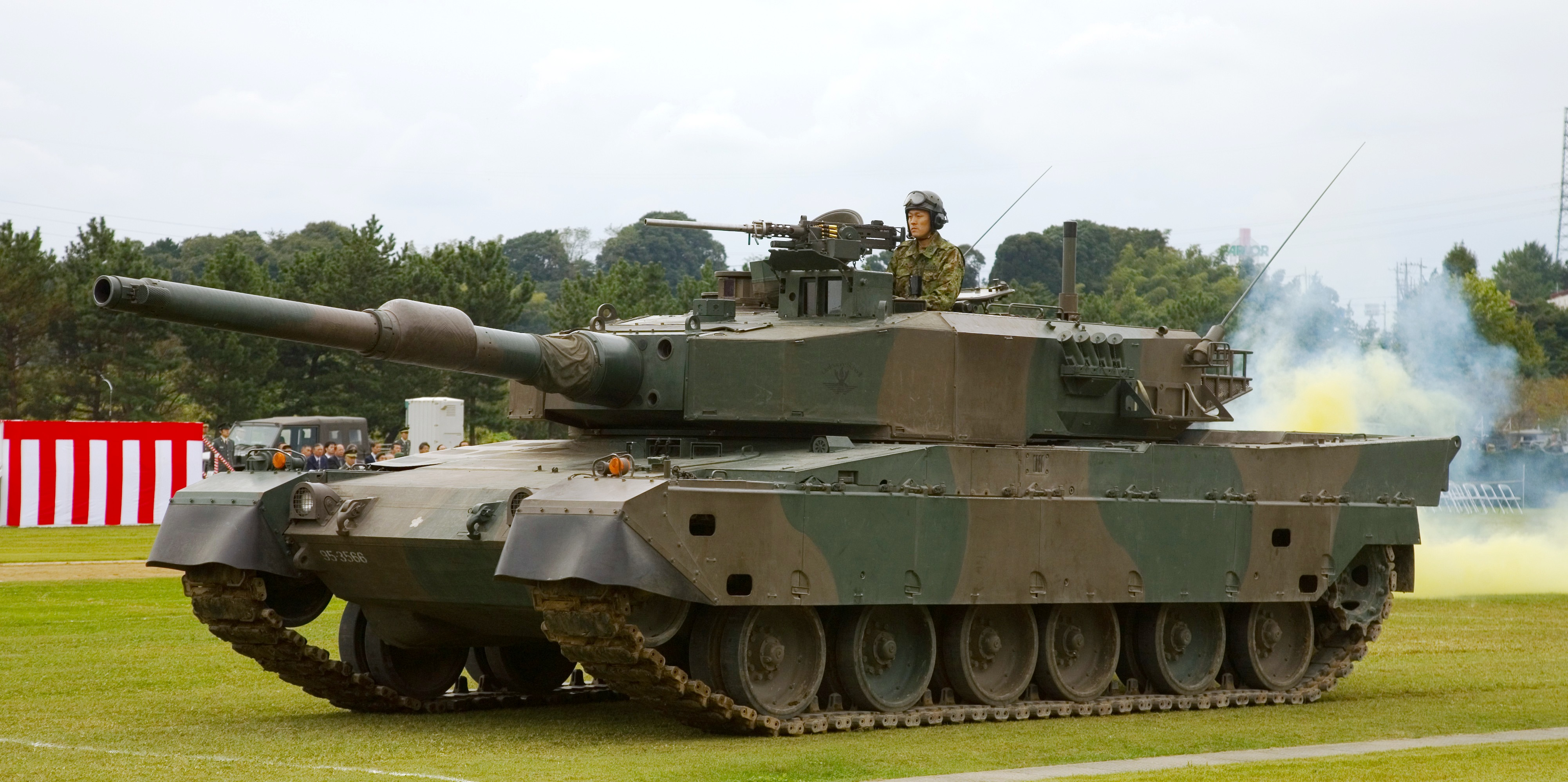
Public demonstration of a Type 90 at the JGSDF Ordnance School, Japan

The Type 90 was to have replaced the Type 74 outright as the Type 74 was generally outdated even before it entered service, but with the ending of the Cold War these plans were scaled back. Requirements of the Type 90 were completed in 1980 with two prototypes and a second series of four prototypes were built between 1986 and 1988 that incorporated changes as a result of trials with the first two prototypes. These were armed with the Rheinmetall 120 mm smoothbore gun also fitted to the German Leopard 2 and, in a modified version, in the US M1A1/M1A2 Abrams MBT.

These second prototypes were used for development and then user trials, all of which were completed by 1989, before Japan formally acknowledged the Type 90 in 1990. With the exception of the 120 mm smooth-bore gun, which is made under license from Rheinmetall of Germany, the Type 90 and its subsystems were all designed and built in Japan. It has been complemented by the Type 10. The Type 10 has armor that consists of modular components, which significantly improves the side armor compared to the Type 90. Whereas the Type 90 used the same 120mm Rheinmetall main gun as other Western powers, the Type 10 uses a completely new gun, developed indigenously by Japan Steel Works.

== Overview per tank ==
=== Type 87 Chi-I (Experimental tank No.1) ===
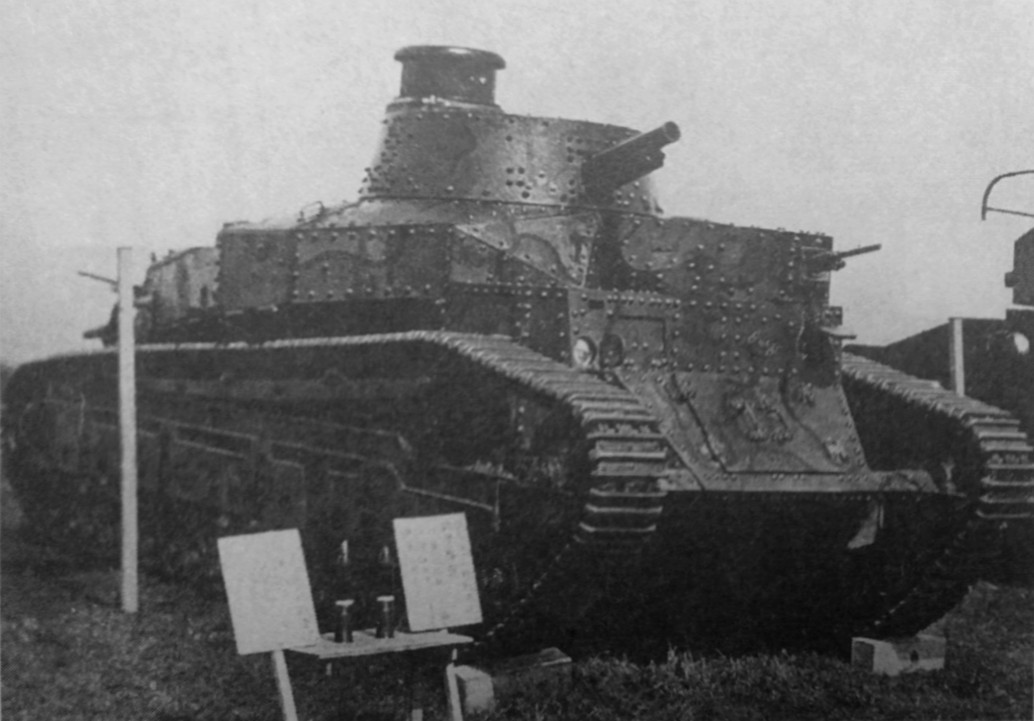
Front-angle view of Experimental tank No.1 (Type 87 Chi-I)

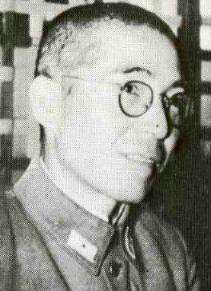
IJA officer Tomio Hara

Development of the first Japanese-designed tank began in June 1925. A small team of four engineers of the Technical Bureau participated in the development, including Major Tomio Hara who later became the head of the tank development department. According to Hara, the first tank on the agenda was to develop a medium main battle tank. The team was allocated two years to complete the project. The design aspect was finished in May 1926.

Production was ordered to begin at the Osaka Army Arsenal. At the time, there was little heavy industry allocated to the production of motor vehicles in Japan, so there were significant difficulties creating the prototype. Experimental tank No.1 a/k/a Type 87 Chi-I was completed by February 1927, within the required time allowed and ready for trials. During the field trials, the 20-ton tank proved to be under-powered. The weight of this initial prototype and its low speed performance did not impress the Imperial Japanese Army General Staff Office, and a new requirement was issued for a lighter tank, with a nominal 10-short-ton (9.1-metric-ton) weight. The new design was modeled after a Vickers Medium Mark C tank, which had been purchased by the Japanese Army in March 1927.

The tank had a complex parallelogram suspension system with two pairs of road bogie wheels per leaf spring arrangement. Hara designed a bell crank scissors suspension that paired the bogie wheels and connected them to a coil spring mounted horizontally outside the hull. This suspension became standard on the majority of the subsequently designed Japanese tanks and can be seen on the Type 95 Ha-Go light tank and Type 97 Chi-Ha, as examples.

=== Type 89 Chi-Ro medium tank ===
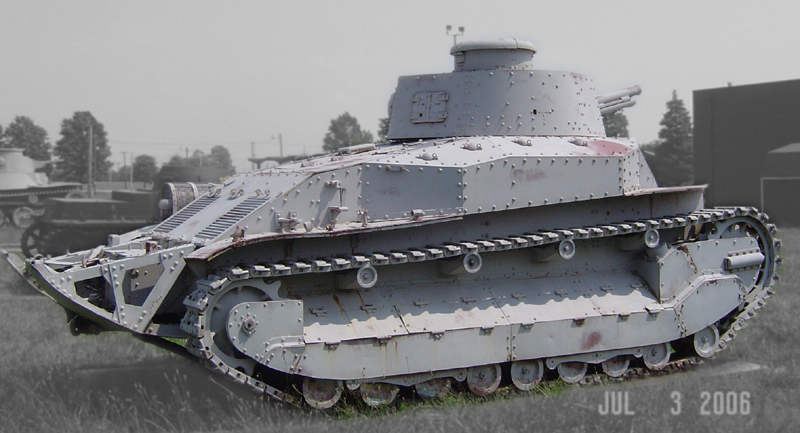
Type 89 "I-Go" on display at the United States Army Ordnance Museum

The IJA decided that the Type 87 Chi-I was too heavy at 20 tons and too slow to be used as its main tank. The Type 89 Chi-Ro (also known as the Type 89 I-Go) was developed to overcome these shortcomings. By April 1928, the new design was finished. The "Experimental tank No.2" prototype was completed in 1929 and designated as the Type 89. The Type 89 was re-classified as a "medium tank" because the weight increased to over 10 tons due to improvements. Production started in 1931, making this the first tank to be mass-produced in Japan. The new design weighed 12.7 tons and used stronger and lighter steel plate instead of the Type 87's iron armor. Armament was a Type 90 57 mm gun, along with two Type 91 6.5 mm machine guns.

The Type 89 had two variants - the Kō ("A"), which used a water-cooled gasoline engine, and the Otsu ("B"), with an air-cooled diesel engine and improved frontal armor. Of the two versions, a total of 113 Kō tanks and 291 Otsu tanks were produced. The Type 89 served with Japanese infantry divisions and first saw combat use in China during the First Battle of Shanghai in 1932. It was deployed for operations in the Second Sino-Japanese War. With the Type 89 fast becoming obsolete by the late 1930s, the IJA began a program to develop a replacement tank for infantry support. The IJA was also interested in the lighter and less expensive Type 97 Chi-Ni prototype proposed by Osaka Army Arsenal, which had the same 57 mm gun. However, with the out-break of war with China on 7 July 1937, the peacetime budgetary limitations were removed and the Mitsubishi "Chi-Ha" model was accepted as the new Type 97 medium tank by the army as the replacement for the Type 89.

=== Type 92 tankette ===
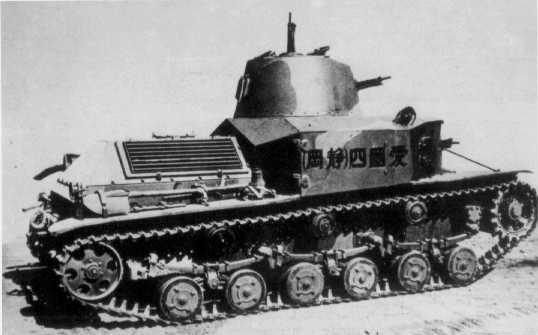
Early model Type 92 tankette

Known as the Type 92 heavy armoured car or the Type 92 cavalry tank, it was the Empire of Japan's first indigenous tankette. The Imperial Japanese Army had determined that the Type 89 medium tank was too slow for mobile operations, so Ishikawajima Motorcar Manufacturing Company (currently Isuzu), was given the task of designing an armoured tracked vehicle for use by the cavalry in scouting and infantry support. Work began on the Type 92 prototype in March 1932 and it was completed the same year. Production began in 1933.

The Type 92 used riveted and welded armor with a maximum thickness of 6 mm in the hull and turret. The thin riveted armor kept the weight to three tons; however, it could be penetrated by .30 and .50 caliber machine gun fire. The armament consisted of two machine guns, one in the manually traversed turret and one in the hull. Early models had 6.5 mm Type 91 machine guns in both positions. Later, the hull-mounted weapon was replaced with a manually aimed 13 mm Type 92 heavy machine gun, license-built from Hotchkiss.

Production of the Type 92 was plagued by technical problems, including a poor suspension, and welding issues. Only a total of 167 units were built between 1933 and 1936. The Type 92 saw combat in China and Manchuria during the Second Sino-Japanese War.

=== Type 94 tankette ===
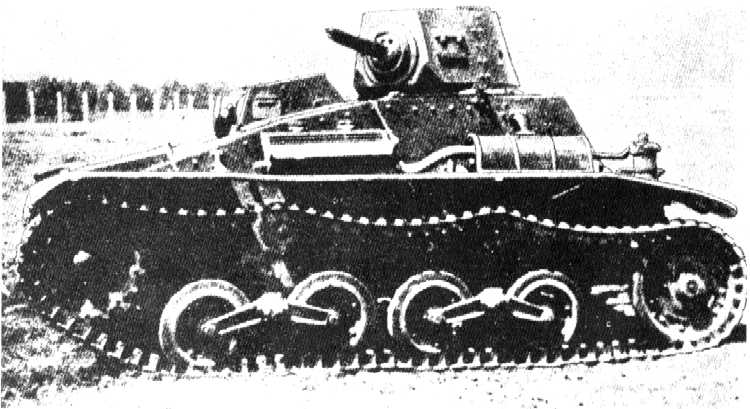
Late model Type 94 tankette

The Type 94 tankette (Japanese: 九四式軽装甲車, romanized: Kyūyon-shiki keisōkōsha, literally "94 type light armored car" was a tankette produced for the Imperial Japanese Army. In 1930 the IJA ordered some Carden Loyd tankettes from Great Britain, along with some French Renault UE Chenillette vehicles and field tested them. The IJA determined that the British and French machines were too small to be practical, and started planning for a larger version, the Tokushu Keninsha (TK, meaning "Special Tractor").

The initial attempt resulted in the Type 92 cavalry tank. However, Japanese infantry commanders felt that a similar vehicle would be useful as the support vehicle for transport, scout and communications within the infantry divisions.

The TK was a small light tracked vehicle with a turret armed with one machine gun. For cargo transportation it pulled an ammunition trailer. After trials in both Manchukuo and Japan, the design was standardized and reclassified as the Type 94 (Type 2594) tankette. It was designed for "reconnaissance", but could also be utilized for supporting infantry attacks and transporting supplies. It entered service in 1935. The lightweight Type 94 was "tailored" for operating in China. It was used for infantry support and reconnaissance by infantry divisions. The Type 94 tankette proved effective in Manchuria and elsewhere as the Chinese National Revolutionary Army consisted of only three tank battalions to oppose them. As with nearly all nation's tankettes built in the 1920s and 1930s, they had thin armor and could be penetrated by .30 and .50 caliber machine gun fire.

Variants included the Type 94 disinfecting vehicle and Type 94 gas scattering vehicle, which was a Type 94 tankette adapted for chemical warfare. The tankette was used as a "tractor", where it would pull either a configured independent tracked mobile liquid dissemination chemical vehicle or a respective tracked mobile disinfecting anti-chemical agents vehicle. The gas scattering vehicle version could scatter a mustard gas chemical agent with an 8m width, and the disinfecting vehicle version scattered "bleaching powder to counteract the poison gas" or pathogenic agents.

=== Type 97 Te-Ke tankette ===
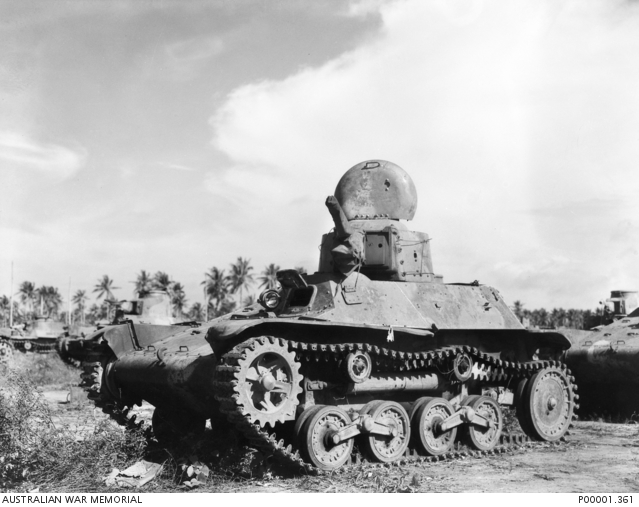
A Type 97 Te-Ke in New Britain

The 'Type 97 Light armored car Te-Ke (九七式軽装甲車 テケ, Kyū-nana-shiki kei sōkōsha Teke) was a tankette designed as a fast reconnaissance vehicle, and was a replacement for the earlier Type 94 TK.

Although the chassis was similar in appearance, the design of the Type 97 was different than the Type 94 in several significant areas. The engine was moved the rear and the gun turret (and commander) moved to the middle of the tankette, with the driver located to the left side of the hull. This gave the two men a better position to communicate with each other. As with the Type 94, the interior was lined with heat insulating asbestos sheets.

The main armament was the Type 94 37 mm tank gun, with 96 rounds, barrel length of 136 cm (L36.7), EL angle of fire of -15 to +20 degrees, AZ angle of fire of 20 degrees, muzzle velocity of 600 m/s, penetration of 45 mm/300 m, which was also used by Type 95 Ha-Go. However, due to shortages in the production of this weapon, most vehicles were fitted with a 7.7 mm Type 97 machine gun instead.

The Type 97 replaced the Type 94 on the assembly line in 1939, it was primarily assigned to reconnaissance regiments, and, as with US Army tanks prior to 1941, was not designed to engage enemy tanks. Because it was a reconnaissance vehicle, built for speed, and not direct combat, its hull and turret were designed for only two crewmen; leaving the tankette commander to load and fire the main gun. As with most tankettes it was severely deficient in armor protection, and was prey for any anti-tank weapon of the time.

Variants included the Type 97 disinfecting vehicle and Type 97 gas scattering vehicle, which was adapted for chemical warfare. The Type 98 So-Da APC designed for use as an armored personnel and ammunition carrier. Also, the Type 100 Te-Re designed for use as an artillery observation vehicle.

=== Type 95 Ha-Go light tank ===
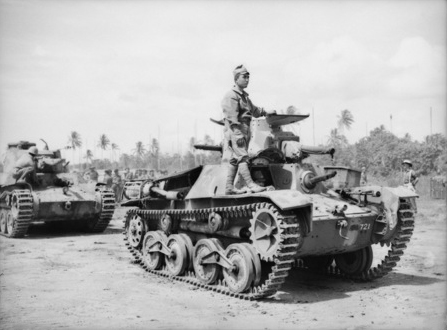
Type 95 Ha-Go in New Britain, following surrender in 1945

The Type 95 Ha-Go (also known as the Type 97 Ke-Go) was a replacement for the Type 89 medium tank, which was considered too slow for mechanized warfare. The prototypes were built by Mitsubishi and production was started in 1936, with 2,300 completed by the end of the war. The initial version was armed with a Type 94 37 mm main gun and two Type 91 6.5 mm machine guns. From 1937 forward, it was armed with a longer barrel 37 mm main gun and two Type 97 7.7 mm (0.303 inch) machine guns, one in the rear section of the turret and the other hull-mounted. The changes in armament caused the weight of the tank to increase to 7.4 tons. The Type 95 Ha-Go had a crew of three.

It served throughout the Pacific Theater, including the Second Sino-Japanese War in China, during the Battle of Khalkhin Gol (Nomonhan) against the Soviet Red Army in 1939, and against the British Army in Burma and India. In addition, it engaged in combat on many Pacific islands, such as Guadalcanal, the Marianas, and Iwo Jima. Several variants were built, among them: the prototype Type 3 Ke-Ri, which mounted a Type 97 57 mm tank gun; the Type 4 Ke-Nu, a conversion, re-fitted with the larger turret of the Type 97 Chi-Ha with its Type 97 57 mm tank gun; and the Type 5 Ho-Ru, a prototype self-propelled gun similar to the German Hetzer, but with a Type 1 47 mm tank gun.

=== Type 98 light tank ===
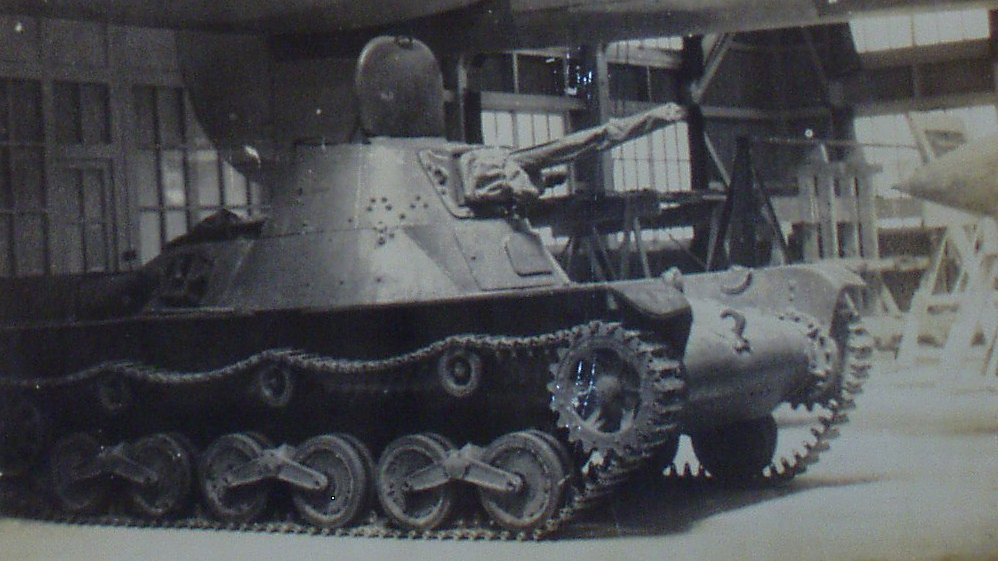
Type 98A Ke-Ni light tank

The Type 98 light tank Ke-Ni (九八式軽戦車 ケニ, Kyuhachi-shiki keisensha Ke-Ni) was designed to replace the Type 95 Ha-Go light tank. It is also referred to as the Type 98 Chi-Ni light tank by some sources. It was developed in 1938 to address deficiencies in the Type 95 design already apparent from combat experience in Manchukuo and China in the Second Sino-Japanese War. The Imperial Japanese Army General Staff realized that the Type 95 was vulnerable to heavy machine-gun fire–(12.7 mm/0.5 inches)–so it determined the development of a new light tank with the same weight as the Type 95, but with thicker armor was needed.

Even though the Hino Motors "Chi-Ni Model A" prototype was accepted after field trials as the new Type 98 light tank, series production did not begin until 1942. The Type 98 had a two-man turret, an improvement on the asymmetrical turret used on the Type 95, carrying a Type 100 37 mm tank gun, with a muzzle velocity of 760 m/s (2,500 ft/s) and a 7.7 mm machine-gun in a coaxial mount. A total of 104 Type 98s are known to have been built: 1 in 1941, 24 in 1942 and 79 in 1943. One prototype variant built in 1941 was the Type 98 Ta-Se, an anti-aircraft tank that mounted a converted Type 98 20 mm AA machine cannon.

=== Type 2 Ke-To light tank ===
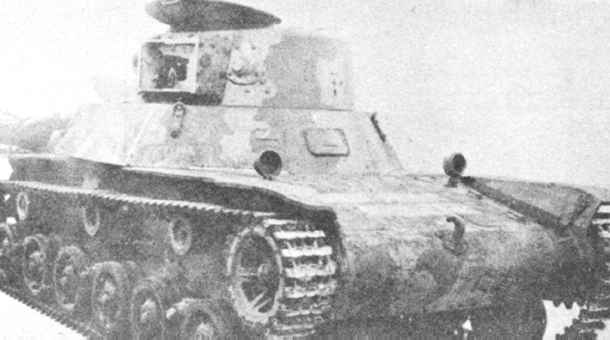
Type 2 Ke-To light tank

The Type 2 Ke-To light tank (二式軽戦車 ケト, Nishiki keisensha Ke-To) was developed by the Imperial Japanese Army during World War II as an improvement on the existing Type 98 Ke-Ni. Development work on the Type 2 proceeded with an improved Type 1 37 mm gun in an enlarged turret. However, production did not commence until 1944, and by that date Japan was desperate for steel (largely due to US submarine warfare). This, combined with the American strategic bombing campaign that laid waste to the industrial infrastructure, which, when added to the IJN's priority for warship construction, made it clear to the military that the Type 95 light tank would maintain its precedence on the assembly lines. Although obsolete, the Type 95 was cost effective and very reliable. Only 34 Type 2 Ke-To tanks were completed by the end of the war. No Type 2 Ke-To light tanks are known to have engaged in combat prior to Japan's surrender.

A variant known as the Type 4 work vehicle was an engineering vehicle developed in 1944 on the chassis of the Type 2 Ke-To. It was equipped with a dozer blade on the front end for use in airfield construction. It was also equipped with a 30kW generator to power tools and a flood light for night work. The exact number produced is unknown.

=== Type 4 Ke-Nu light tank ===
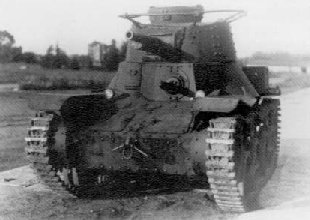
Type 4 Ke-Nu light tank

The Type 4 light tank Ke-Nu (四式軽戦車 ケヌ, Yon-shiki keisensha Kenu) was an innovation created to increase the number of light tanks available to front-line infantry divisions of the Imperial Japanese Army in World War II. Through the modernization of Type 97 Chi-Ha medium tanks, in which its 57 mm gun turrets were replaced with 47 mm high velocity gun turrets, the 57 mm gun turrets were then available to install on Type 95 Ha-Go light tank hulls; thus creating a new light tank.

The original version of the Type 97 Chi-Ha medium tank had been armed with a low muzzle velocity 57 mm tank gun. Operational experience against the Soviet Red Army in 1939 revealed that this gun was inadequate against opposing armor, and a new higher velocity 47 mm tank gun was developed. This gun was installed in a new turret on the Type 97 Chi-Ha medium tank hull to produce the Type 97-Kai Shinhoto version. This left a large number of surplus Type 97 Chi-Ha turrets that were later retrofitted onto the chassis of the obsolete Type 95 Ha-Go tank, which had been armed with a 37 mm tank gun. The result of the conversion gave the tank slightly better firepower, but the retrofitting increased its total weight to 8.4 tons. This reduced the top speed of the tank to 40 km/h. According to several estimates, approximately 100 tanks were converted late in the war.

=== Type 97 Chi-Ha medium tank ===
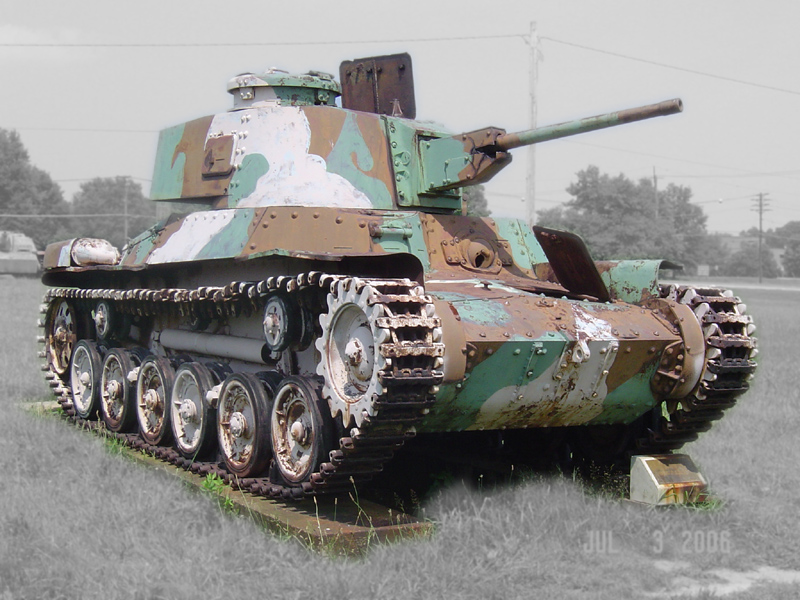
Type 97 Shinhoto Chi-Ha at the United States Army Ordnance Museum

The Type 97 medium tank Chi-Ha (九七式中戦車 チハ, Kyunana-shiki chu-sensha chiha) was the most widely produced Japanese medium tank of World War II, with about 25 mm thick armor on its turret sides, and 30 mm on its gun shield, considered average protection in the 1930s. The Type 97 57 mm tank gun was an improved version (as to function and durability) of the Type 90 57 mm main gun that was used in the Type 89 medium tank. The gun was designed to support the infantry, while the 170 hp diesel Mitsubishi was a capable engine for the tank in 1938. The number of Type 97 medium tanks produced was slightly lower than the output of Type 95 Ha-Go light tanks, but larger than any other medium tank fielded by Japan. Some 3,000 examples of the Type 97 Chi-Ha were produced by Mitsubishi, including several types of specialized tanks.

Armed with a low-velocity 57 mm main gun, the shortcoming of the Type 97 Chi-Ha became clear during the 1939 Battles of Khalkhin Gol against the Soviet Union. The 45 mm gun of the Soviet BT-5 and BT-7 tanks out-ranged the 57 mm tank gun, resulting in heavy Japanese losses. This convinced the army of the need for a more powerful gun. From 1942 on-wards, the Model 97 was equipped with a high-velocity Type 1 47 mm tank gun, mounted in a larger three-man turret. This version was designated Shinhoto Chi-Ha ("new turret"). Type 97 Shinhoto Chi-Ha tanks were first used in combat during the battle of Corregidor Island of the Philippines in 1942. It went on to serve against allied forces throughout the Pacific and East Asia as well as the Soviets during the July–August 1945 conflict in Manchuria. While vulnerable to opposing Allied tanks (US M3 Lee/British M3 Grant, M4 Medium and T-34), the 47 mm high-velocity gun did give the Shinhoto Chi-Ha a fighting chance against them and it is considered to be the best Japanese tank to have seen "combat service" in the Pacific War.

=== Type 1 Chi-He medium tank ===
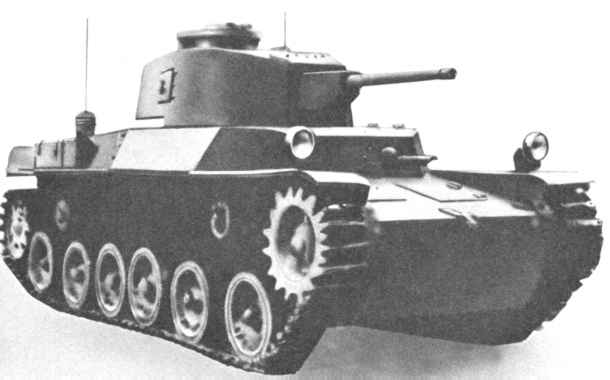
Type 1 Chi-He medium tank

The Type 1 Chi-He was developed in 1942 to replace the Type 97. The three-man turret and 47 mm gun of the Type 1 were retrofitted on the modified hull of the Type 97 that the factories were already producing. The Type 1 Chi-He was the first Japanese tank to carry a radio as standard equipment in each tank, eliminating the need to use signal flags. Compared to the Type 97, the Type 1 Chi-He was slightly longer and taller. Its angled, thicker frontal armor was welded, as opposed to riveted. The adding of the frontal armor and a fifth crewman increased the weight, but the "streamlining" of the hull reduced the increase to only 1.5 tons. Further, its engine generated 70 horsepower more than the Type 97 engine.

Although the Type 1 Chi-He proved to be superior to the Type 97 in both speed and armor protection, production did not begin until 1943 due to the higher priority of steel allocated to the Imperial Navy for warship construction. Further, production of the tank was discontinued after less than one year in favor of the Type 3 Chi-Nu medium tank, as the Type 1 Chi-He still would underperform against the American M4 Sherman. A total of 170 units were built from 1943 to 1944, but they did not see combat use as they were allocated to the defense of the Japanese home islands.

=== Type 3 Chi-Nu medium tank ===
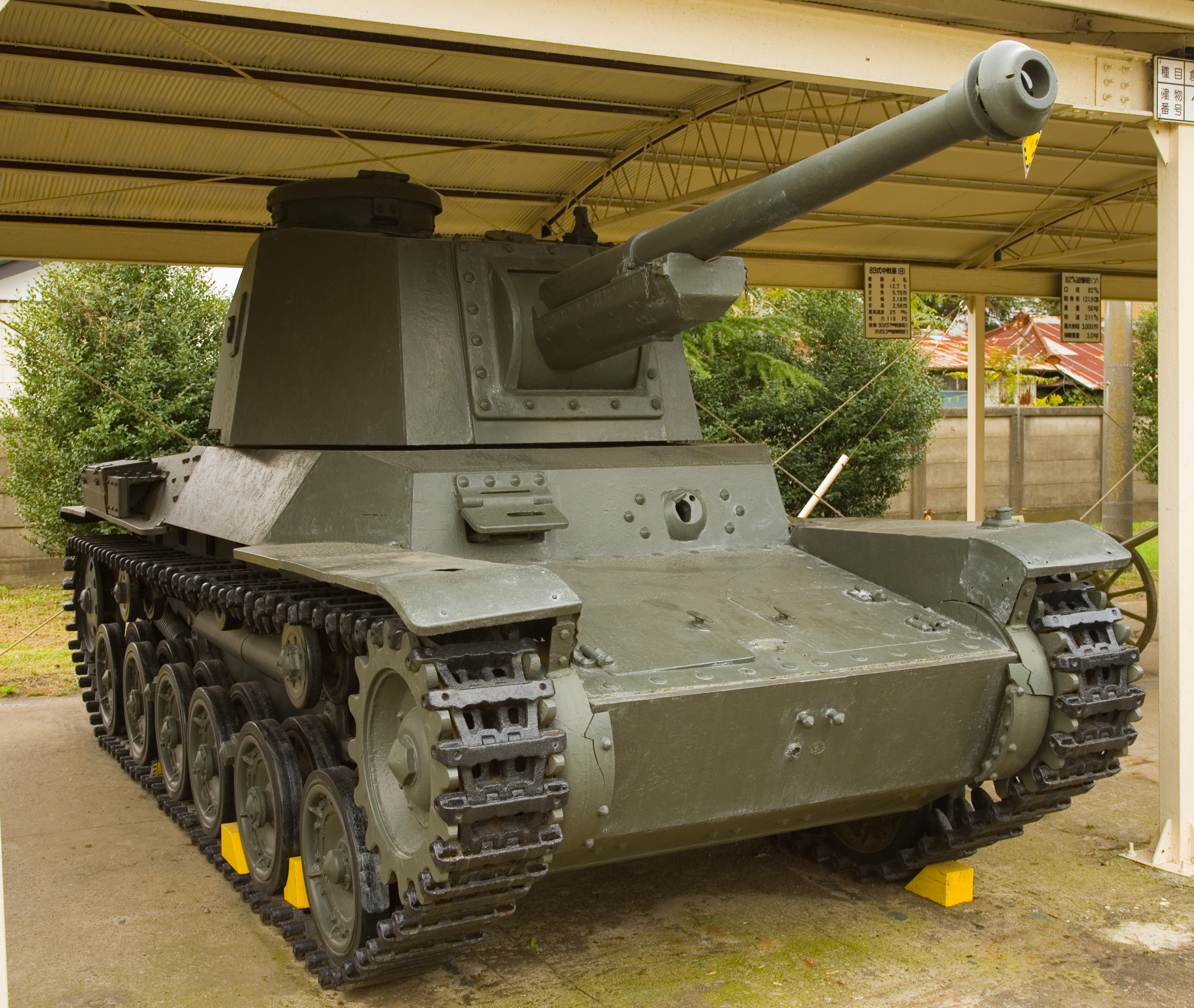
Type 3 Chi-Nu at the JGSDF Ordnance School, Japan

The Type 3 Chi-Nu medium tank was urgently developed to counter the American M4 Sherman medium tank. Originally, the next tank in development to replace the Chi-He was the Type 4 Chi-To medium tank. However, the development of the Type 4 Chi-To was delayed, and a "stopgap tank" was needed. The development of Chi-Nu occurred in 1943. The low priority given tanks, along with the raw material shortages meant that the Type 3 did not enter production until 1944. It was the last design based directly on Type 97 lineage.

The Chi-Nu retained the same chassis and suspension of the Type 1 Chi-He, but with a new large hexagonal gun turret and a commander's cupola. The main armament, a Type 3 75 mm tank gun, was based on the Japanese Type 90 field gun. The thickest armor used was 50 mm on the front hull; it also had 25 mm on the turret, 25 mm on the sides and 20 mm on the rear deck. Given the fact that available raw materials were in very short supply, and with much of Japan's industrial infrastructure being destroyed by American strategic bombing in 1945, its production run was severely curtailed. The Chi-Nu was the last IJA tank deployed and production continued until the end of the war. The tanks produced were allocated to the Japanese home islands to defend against the projected Allied Invasion.

=== Type 4 Chi-To medium tank ===
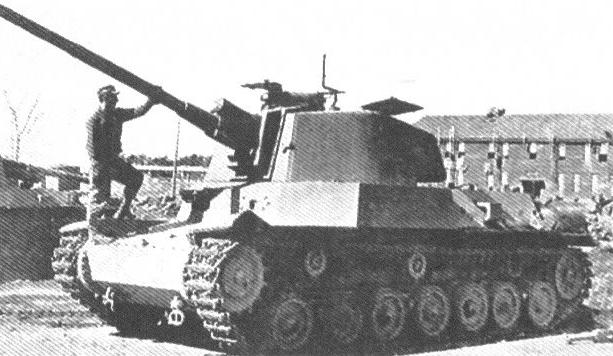
Type 4 Chi-To medium tank

The Type 4 medium tank Chi-To (四式中戦車 チト, Yonshiki chūsensha Chi-To) was one of several new medium and heavy tanks developed by the Imperial Japanese Army towards the end of World War II. It was the most advanced Japanese wartime tank to reach the production phase.

The Type 4 Chi-To was a thirty-ton, all-welded tank with a maximum armor thickness of about 75 mm. It was much larger than the Type 97 Chi-Ha, with a longer, wider, tall chassis, supported by seven road wheels on each side. The 400 hp (300 kW) gasoline engine was significantly more powerful than the 180 kW (240 hp) engine of the Type 3 Chi-Nu, giving it a top speed of 45 km/h (28 mph). The tank had a range of 250 km (160 mi). The main armament, a Type 5 75 mm tank gun, was based on the Type 4 75 mm AA Gun that was in turn essentially a copy of a Bofors Model 1929 75 mm AA Gun, housed in a large powered, well-armoured hexagonal gun turret. One Type 97 heavy tank machine gun was mounted in the front hull, and there was a ball mount on the side of the turret for a second one. Two Type 4 Chi-To tanks were completed prior to the end of the war. Neither of the completed tanks saw combat use.

=== Type 5 Chi-Ri medium tank ===
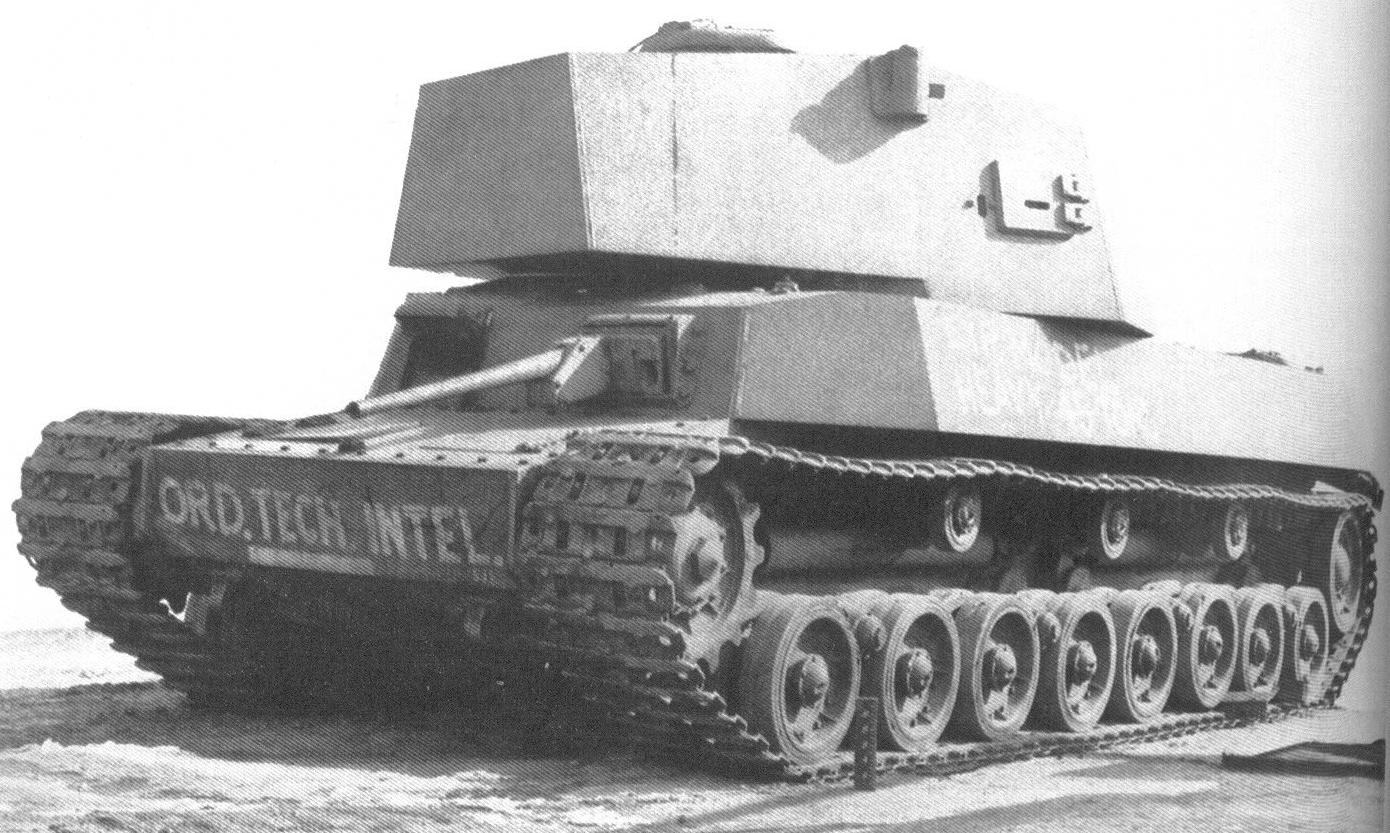
Incomplete Type 5 Chi-Ri prototype captured by American forces

The Type 5 medium tank Chi-Ri (五式中戦車, Go-shiki chusensha Chi-ri) was the ultimate medium tank developed by the Imperial Japanese Army in World War II. Intended to be a heavier, lengthened, more powerful version of Japan's sophisticated Type 4 Chi-To medium tank, in performance it was designed to surpass the US M4 Sherman medium tanks being fielded by the Allied forces. It was to be powered by a "Kawasaki Type 98 800 HP engine Ha-9-IIb" detuned for the tank to 550 hp. Originally, the tank was to be fitted with the same Type 5 75 mm tank gun used on the Type 4 Chi-To and with a front hull-mounted Type 1 37 mm tank gun. Eventually, an 88 mm gun (based on the Type 99 88 mm AA Gun) was planned for the turret. There were also plans for a variant known as the Type 5 Chi-Ri II, which was to be diesel powered and using the Type 5 75 mm tank gun as its main armament.

Along with the Type 4 Chi-To medium tanks, the Type 5 Chi-Ri was originally considered for use in the final defense of the Japanese home islands against the expected Allied invasions. However, the project was abandoned to free up manpower and critical resources to concentrate on the development and production of the more practical Type 4 Chi-To medium tank. As with many innovative weapons projects launched by Japan in the final months of World War II, production could not advance due to material shortages, and the loss of Japan's industrial infrastructure to the allied bombing of Japan. With the end of the Pacific War, an incomplete Type 5 prototype was seized by American forces during the occupation of Japan.

=== O-I super-heavy tank ===
The O-I experimental super-heavy tank had four turrets and weighed 120+ tons and required a crew of 11 men. It was 10 meters long by 4.2 meters wide with an overall height of 4 meters. The armor was 200 mm at its maximum, and the tank had a top speed of 25 km/h. It had two gasoline engines, and was to be armed in the central main turret with a modified Type 92 105 mm cannon, and have several smaller turrets on the hull in the front and rear. According to Akira Takizawa (on the original plans) as secondary armament the two front hull sub-turrets were designed to each carry a 70 mm gun and a rear hull sub-turret was designed to have twin Type 97 7.7 mm machine guns. It has been reported that an incomplete prototype without turrets was built, with the project ending after the tank proved to be "impractical". The complete development history of the O-I prototype is unknown and no images of the O-I are known to exist.

=== Amphibious tanks ===
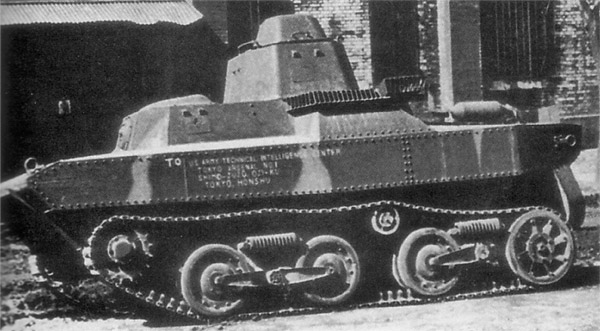
Experimental SR II Ro-Go amphibious tank

During the 1930s and 1940s, the Japanese designed and produced a number of amphibious tank designs. Originally an army project, several experimental models, such as the Sumida amphibious armored car (AMP), SR I-Go, SR II Ro-Go and SR III Ha-Go were produced for concept evaluation. Each of the SR series were 3.6 to 7 tonne amphibious tanks, which had 2 to 3 crewmen and were armed with machine guns. In 1940, the Imperial Japanese Navy took over development of amphibious vehicles as it planned a major campaign in the Pacific with amphibious operations and thereby needed vehicles that could support the landings.

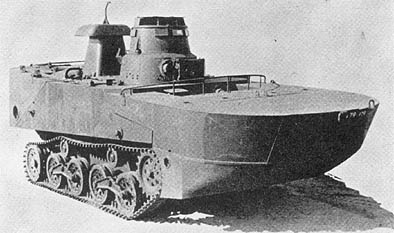
Type 2 Ka-Mi amphibious tank with its flotation sections attached

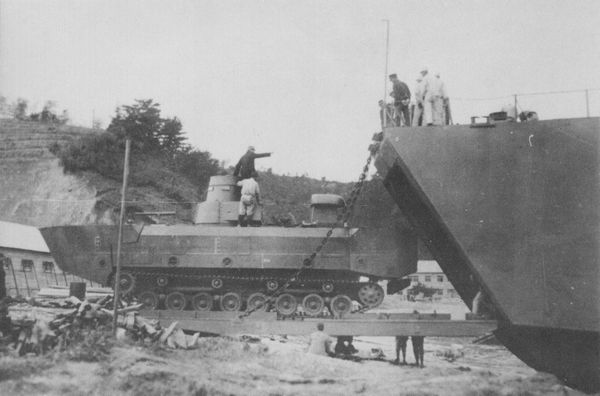
Type 3 Ka-Chi amphibious tank

The Type 1 Mi-Sha a/k/a/ "Type 1 Floating tank Ka-Mi" was the first IJN prototype produced. Mitsubishi used the knowledge gained from IJA's former SR program. The IJN tanks produced included prototypes such as the Type 1 Mi-Sha and Type 5 To-Ku. Production amphibious tanks included the Type 2 Ka-Mi, and Type 3 Ka-Chi; while other amphibious transports included the F B swamp vehicle, and Type 4 Ka-Tsu APC. All of these for use by the Japanese Special Naval Landing Forces (SNLF) in campaigns in the Pacific.

The Type 1 Mi-Sha experimental design led to the Type 2 Ka-Mi, which was based on the Type 95 Ha-Go light tank chassis. The Type 2 Ka-Mi was the first production Japanese amphibious tank, although beginning in 1942 only 182 to 184 units were built. The Type 2 Ka-Mi was first used in combat on Guadalcanal. Later they were encountered by US forces in fighting on the Marshall Islands, and Mariana Islands; particularly on Saipan where they supported the Yokosuka Base Special Naval Landing Forces in its failed amphibious operation. They were also used to support the SNLF during the fighting on the Philippine island of Leyte in late 1944.

The Type 3 Ka-Chi was based on an extensively modified Type 1 Chi-He medium tank and was a larger and more capable version of the earlier Type 2 Ka-Mi amphibious tank. The Type 3 Ka-Chi had the useful capacity to be submarine launched, which enabled it to accommodate the increasingly difficult task of daytime reinforcement for isolated island garrisons in the South Pacific and in Southeast Asia. However, given the fact the main priorities of the navy were in warship and aircraft production, and lacking in any definite plans for additional amphibious operations, production of the Type 3 Ka-Chi remained a very low priority. Only 12 to 19 Type 3 Ka-Chi tanks were built during the war.

The Type 5 To-Ku was a large, heavy prototype based on the Type 5 Chi-Ri chassis and Type 3 Ka-Chi. It boasted extensive armor protection and was fitted with a modified turret of the one used on the Type 97 Shinhoto Chi-Ha medium tank that mounted a Type 1 25 mm gun. In addition, it had a front hull mounted Type 1 47 mm tank gun. The suspension, pontoons and propulsion system were substantially the same as the Type 3 Ka-Chi.

=== Tank destroyers and assault guns ===
==== Type 1 Ho-Ni I Gun tank ====
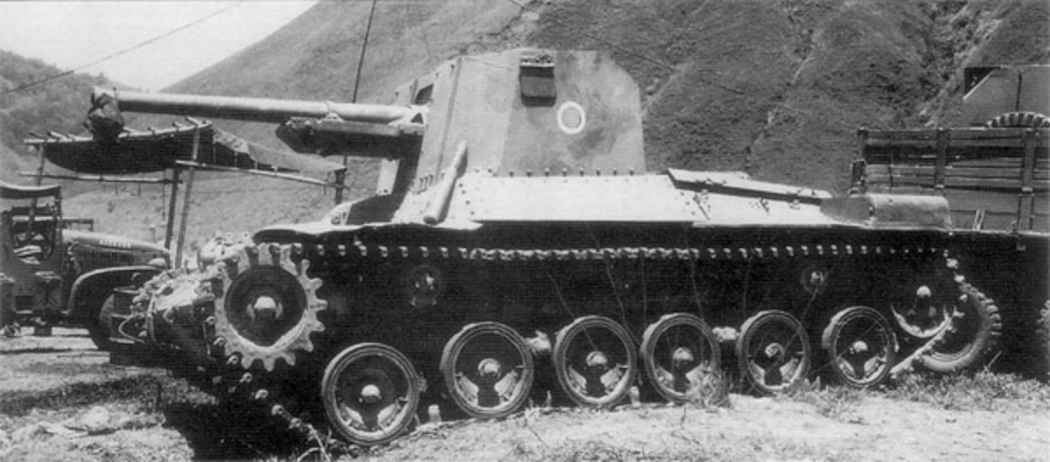
Type 1 Ho-Ni I tank destroyer

The Type 1 Gun tank Ho-Ni I (一式砲戦車 ホニ I, Isshiki ho-sensha Ho-NiI?) was a tank destroyer and self-propelled artillery developed by the Imperial Japanese Army for use during World War II in the Pacific theater. As units of the Japanese Army began to encounter advanced Allied medium tanks, such as the M4 Sherman, it was seen that the Japanese Type 97 Chi-Ha main battle tank lacked sufficient armor or armament to deal with this threat, and work was begun on a tank destroyer version.

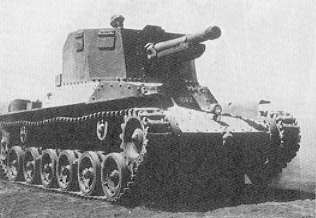
Type 1 Ho-Ni II tank destroyer

The Type 1 Ho-Ni I was developed by utilizing the existing Type 97 chassis and engine, and replacing the gun turret with a Type 90 75 mm field gun mounted in an open casemate with frontal and side armour only, which made it very vulnerable in close combat. The mounting for the 75 mm Type 90 field gun allowed for 20 degrees of traverse to either side and -5 to +25 degrees of elevation. The plan was for self-propelled guns of the Ho-Ni series to form part of a fire support company in each of the tank regiments. Production of the Type 1 Ho-Ni I took place during 1942. It was first deployed in combat during the Battle of Luzon in the Philippines in 1945, but like the rest of the Japanese armor, they were defeated in action against superior US Army forces.

One variant produced was known as the Type 1 Ho-Ni II, which mounted a Type 91 105 mm howitzer. It had a slightly changed superstructure as far as the side armor with re-positioned observation visors. This version entered production in 1943. The total limited number produced of both the Type 1 Ho-Ni I and Ho-Ni II were 80 units.

==== Type 2 Ho-I Gun tank ====
Type 2 Ho-I gun tank

The Type 2 Gun tank Ho-I (二式砲戦車 ホイ, Ni-shiki hōsensha Ho-I) support tank was a derivative of the Type 97 Chi-Ha medium tanks of the Imperial Japanese Army in World War II. Similar in concept to early variant of the German Panzer IV, it was designed as a self-propelled howitzer to provide the close-in fire support for standard Japanese medium tanks with additional firepower against enemy anti-tank fortifications.

After experience in the war in China, Japanese planners wanted an armored vehicle with a larger weapon would be useful against fortified enemy positions, such as pillboxes. They began work on mounting a Type 41 75 mm Mountain Gun onto the chassis of the Chi-Ha medium tank. The adapted mountain gun, known as the Type 99 75 mm tank gun, was completed in 1940. Thereafter, the short barreled Type 99 75 mm gun was fitted into a Type 97-Kai gun turret on a Type 97 chassis for the prototype version built. The production model utilized the chassis of the Type 1 Chi-He medium tank and had secondary armament of a single 7.7 mm Type 97 heavy tank machine gun in the hull. For deployment, the gun tank was intended to be used in a fire support company for each of the tank regiments. In 1944, a total of 31 units were produced. No Type 2 Ho-I gun tanks are known to have engaged in combat prior to Japan's surrender.

==== Type 3 Ho-Ni III tank destroyer ====
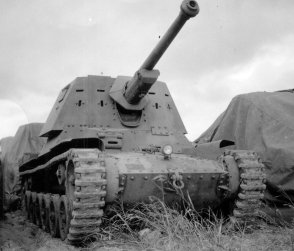
Type 3 Ho-Ni III tank destroyer

The Type 3 Ho-Ni III (三式砲戦車 ホニIII, San-shiki hōsensha) gun tank was a tank destroyer and self-propelled artillery of Imperial Japanese Army in World War II. The Type 3 Ho-Ni III superseded the Type 1 Ho-Ni I and its variant the Type 1 Ho-Ni II in production. It gave better protection to the crew due to having a completely enclosed superstructure. It was also meant to replace the Type 2 Ho-I for fire support. The Type 3 Ho-Ni III utilized the Type 97 chassis.

The main armament of the Type 3 Ho-Ni III was a Type 3 75 mm tank gun, based on the 75 mm Type 90 Field Gun, which was also used in the Type 3 Chi-Nu medium tank. Previous gun tanks, Type 1 Ho-Ni I, Type 1 Ho-Ni II and Type 2 Ho-I, were not really optimized designs. The fully enclosed and armored casemate of the Type 3 Ho-Ni III with the more powerful Type 3 75 mm tank gun was intended to address these issues, and an order for 57 units was placed with Hitachi. Although production began in 1944, it was hampered by material shortages, and by the bombing of Japan in World War II. Only 31 to 41 units were completed. The Type 3 Ho-Ni III tank destroyers were assigned to various combat units, most stationed within the Japanese home islands to defend against the projected Allied Invasion. As the surrender of Japan occurred before that invasion, there is no record of the Type 3 Ho-Ni III being used in actual combat.

==== Type 4 Ho-Ro ====
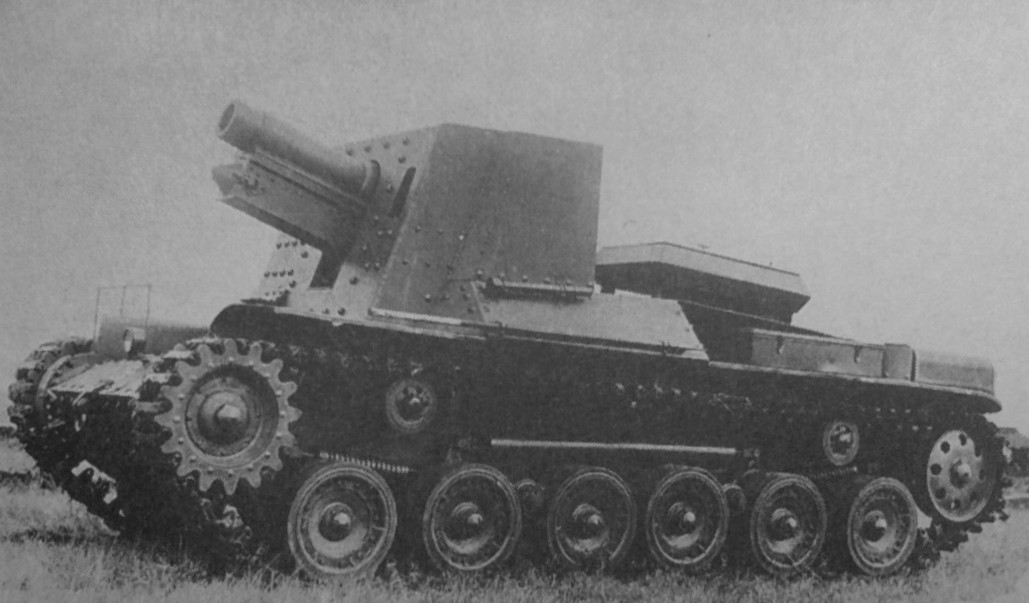
Type 4 15cm self-propelled gun Ho-Ro side view

The Type 4 15cm self-propelled gun Ho-Ro (日本語: 四式十五糎自走砲 ホロ, Imperial Japanese Army Type 4 15cm self-propelled gun Ho-Ro) was self-propelled artillery that used a modified Type 97 chassis. On to this platform, a Type 38 150 mm howitzer was mounted. The main gun could fire Type 88 APHE rounds and HEAT rounds. Given its breech loader, the maximum rate of fire was only 5 rounds per minute. The gun's elevation was restricted to 30 degrees by the construction of the chassis. Other design issues included the fact that although the gun crew was protected by a gun shield with armor thickness of 25 mm at the front, the shield with armor thickness of 12 mm only extended a very short distance on the sides; leaving the rest of the sides and back exposed. In addition, the Ho-Ro did not have any secondary armament, such as a machine-gun, making it vulnerable to close combat. Approximately 12 units were produced.

The Type 4 Ho-Ro was rushed into service, deployed and saw combat as part of the 2nd Tank Division during the Philippines Campaign. Remaining units were deployed to Okinawa in ones and twos for island defense during the Battle of Okinawa, but were severely outnumbered by American artillery.

==== Type 5 Na-To tank destroyer ====
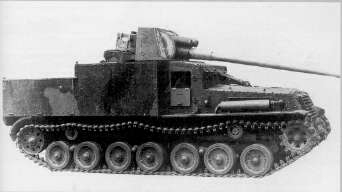
Type 5 Na-To tank destroyer

The Type 5 Na-To (五式砲戦車, Go-shiki hōsensha) was the penultimate tank destroyer developed by the Imperial Japanese Army in the closing stages of World War II. The Type 5 Na-To made use of the chassis of the Type 4 Chi-So armored medium tracked carrier. The superstructure had an open top and rear, with an enclosed armored drivers cab. For the Type 5 Na-To there was added a "shielded platform" for its main gun. Its main anti-tank armament consisted of a Type 5 75 mm tank gun, which was the same gun that was used on the Type 4 Chi-To medium tank. The gun was a variant of the Japanese Type 4 75mm AA Gun.

Towards the end of the Pacific War, Japanese field commanders realized that nothing in the inventory of the Japanese Army would be able to withstand the increasingly advanced tanks and armored vehicles fielded by the Allies, and that a more powerful version of the Type 3 Ho-Ni III was necessary. Development was rushed through on a new design, which was completed in 1945. The Japanese Army immediately issued an order for 200 units to be completed in 1945. However, by that time production was impossible due to material shortages, and the bombing of Japan in World War II, and only two units were completed by the surrender of Japan. Neither was used in combat.

==== Experimental Type 5 Ho-Ri tank destroyer ====
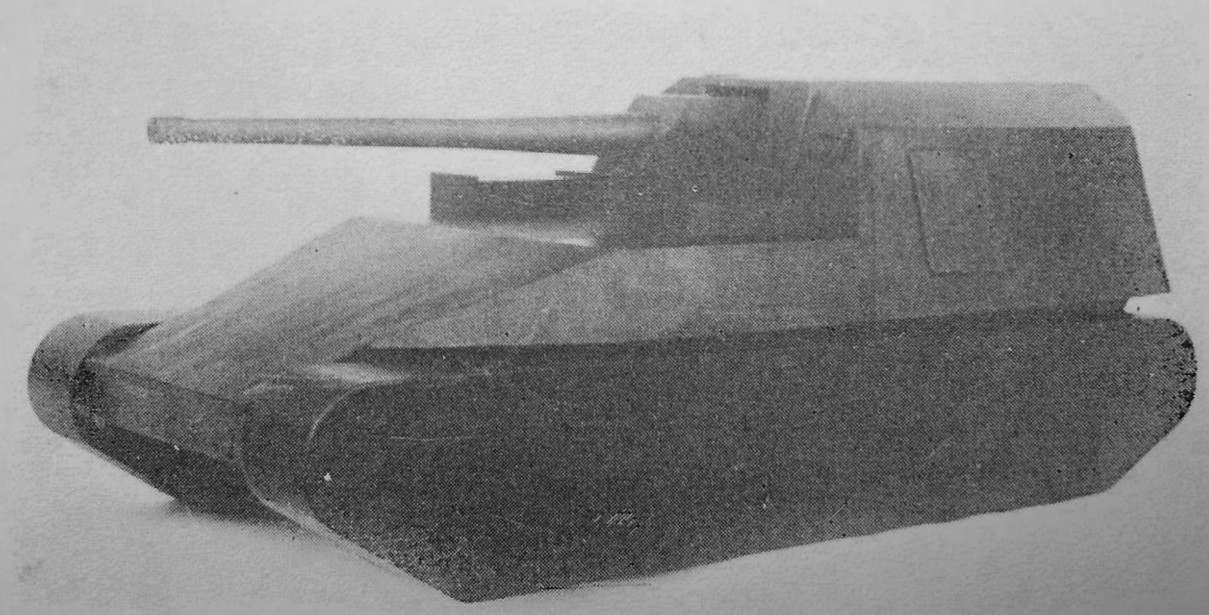
Type 5 Ho-Ri I mock-up scale model

The Ho-Ri was a more powerful tank destroyer (gun tank) using a 105 mm cannon in place of the 75 mm design with an additional 37 mm gun mounted in the front hull. The Ho-Ri was to use the Type 5 Chi-Ri medium tank chassis and have a crew of six. The superstructure for the main gun was placed at the rear and to have sloped armor up to 30 mm thick; the engine was positioned in the center area of the chassis and the driver's station was in the front hull section. All similar in design to the German Ferdinand/Elefant heavy tank destroyer. Another version was to have a twin 25 mm anti-aircraft gun mounted on top of the rear superstructure. The 105 mm main gun was produced and tested. However, according to multiple sources no prototypes of the Ho-Ri were completed.

Another planned variant was the Ho-Ri II tank destroyer. It was to use the same Type 5 Chi-Ri tank chassis. The boxy superstructure for the main 105 mm cannon was to be integral with the hull's sides and placed at the center of the chassis (similar in design to the German Jagdtiger).

== Post World War II tanks ==
=== Japanese Type 61 tank ===
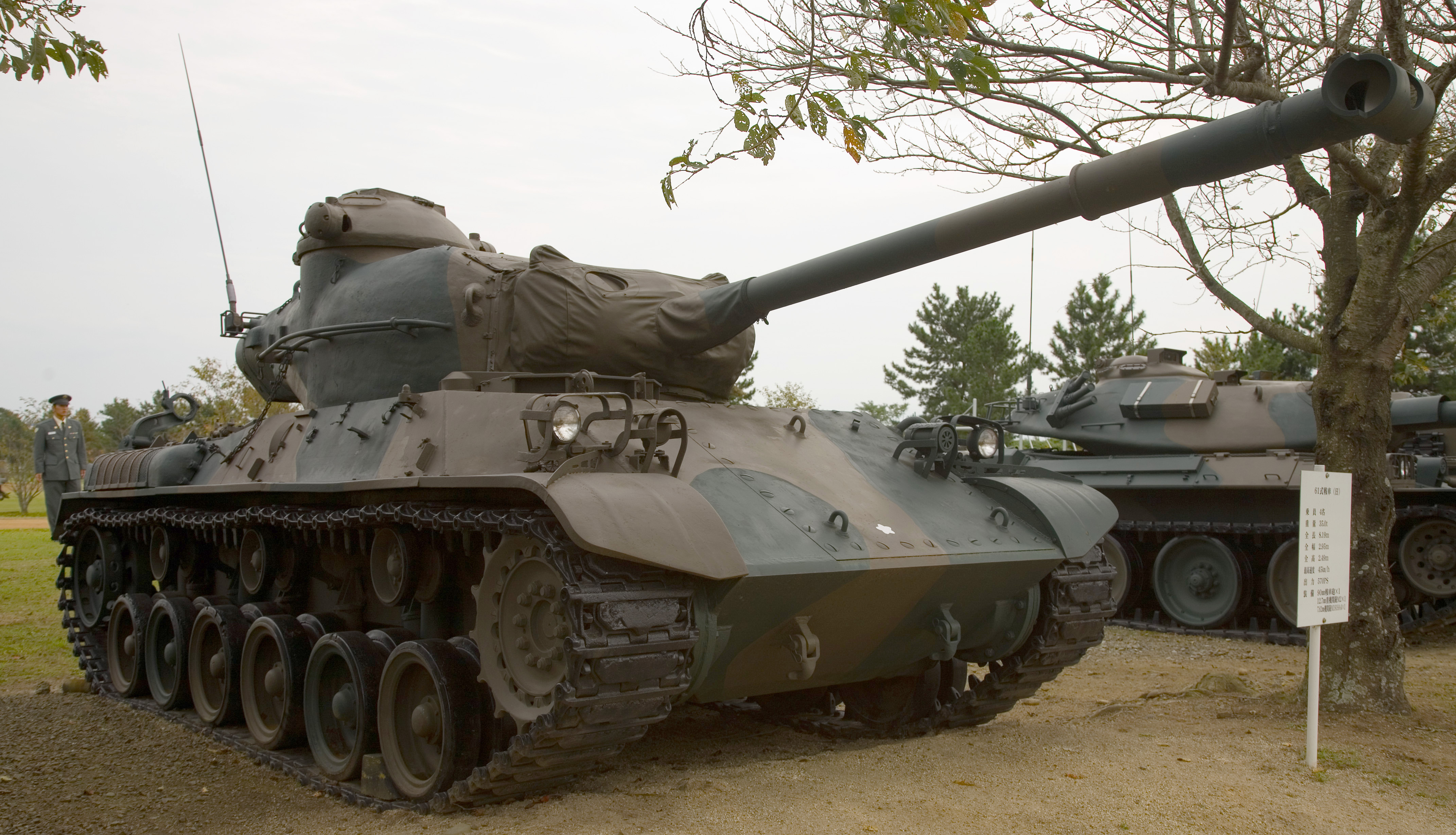
Type 61 tank on display at the JGSDF Ordnance School

The Type 61 (Japanese: ろくいちしきせんしゃ Kanji: 61式戦車) was a main battle tank (MBT) developed and used by the Japan Ground Self-Defense Force (JGSDF), built by Mitsubishi Heavy Industries. Development started in 1955 and the vehicle was first deployed in April 1961. The type number follows the year of deployment. The initial production rate was low, with only ten tanks produced in 1962, increasing to twenty in 1964 and thirty in 1965 and 1966. A total of 250 had been produced by 1970, with production continuing at an increased pace until 1975 when it was terminated. A total of 560 were produced. The Type 61 is conventionally laid out, with a central turret and the engine located at the rear of the hull. The tank has a crew of four, a commander, driver, gunner and loader. The hull is welded steel, with a cast steel turret. The maximum armour thickness is quoted as 64 millimeters. A 12.7 mm machine gun was normally mounted on the cupola for anti-aircraft use. The main gun was the Type 61 90 millimeter caliber rifled gun with a horizontal sliding breech block. The gun is fitted with a t-shaped muzzle brake, which diverts firing gasses sideways, and reduces the amount of dust kicked up by firing. A coaxial 7.62 millimeter machine gun is mounted next to the gun.

=== Japanese Type 74 tank ===
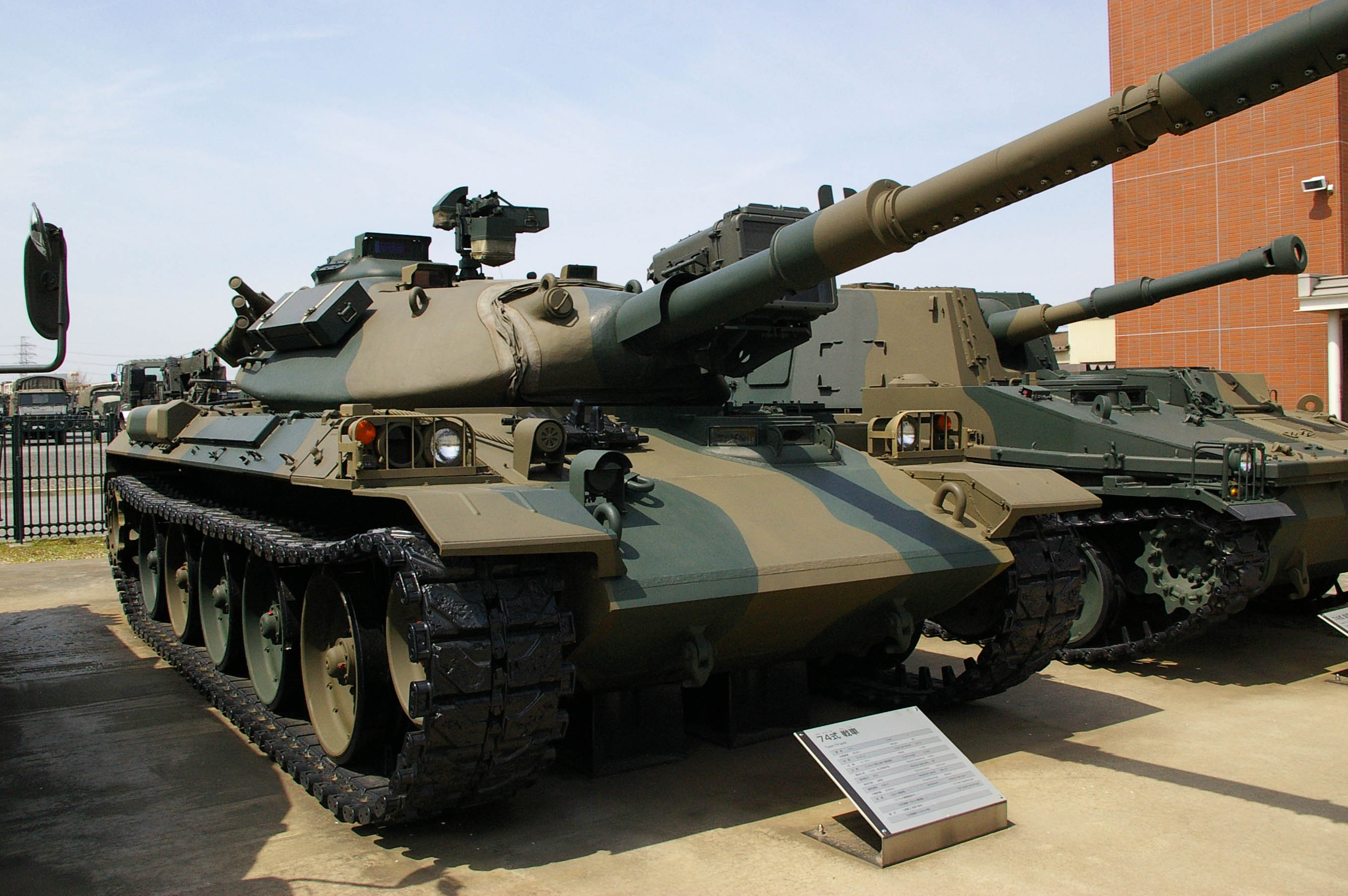
JGSDF Type 74 tank

The Type 74 (74式戦車, nanayonshikisensha) is a main battle tank (MBT) of the Japan Ground Self-Defense Force (JGSDF). It was built by Mitsubishi Heavy Industries as a replacement for the earlier Type 61. It was based on the best features of a number of contemporary designs, placing it in the same class as the US M60 or German Leopard 1. Like these designs, it mounts the M68 105 mm gun. The secondary armament consisted of a 12.7mm anti-aircraft machine gun (with 660 rounds) and a 7.62 co-axial machine gun (4500 rounds). The design did not enter widespread use until 1980, by which point other western forces were starting to introduce much more capable designs. A total of 893 units were produced between September 1975 and 1989, with 225 delivered by January 1980. A total of 822 units were in service in 1990, 870 in service between 1995 and 2000, and 700 in service in 2006.

=== Japanese Type 90 tank ===
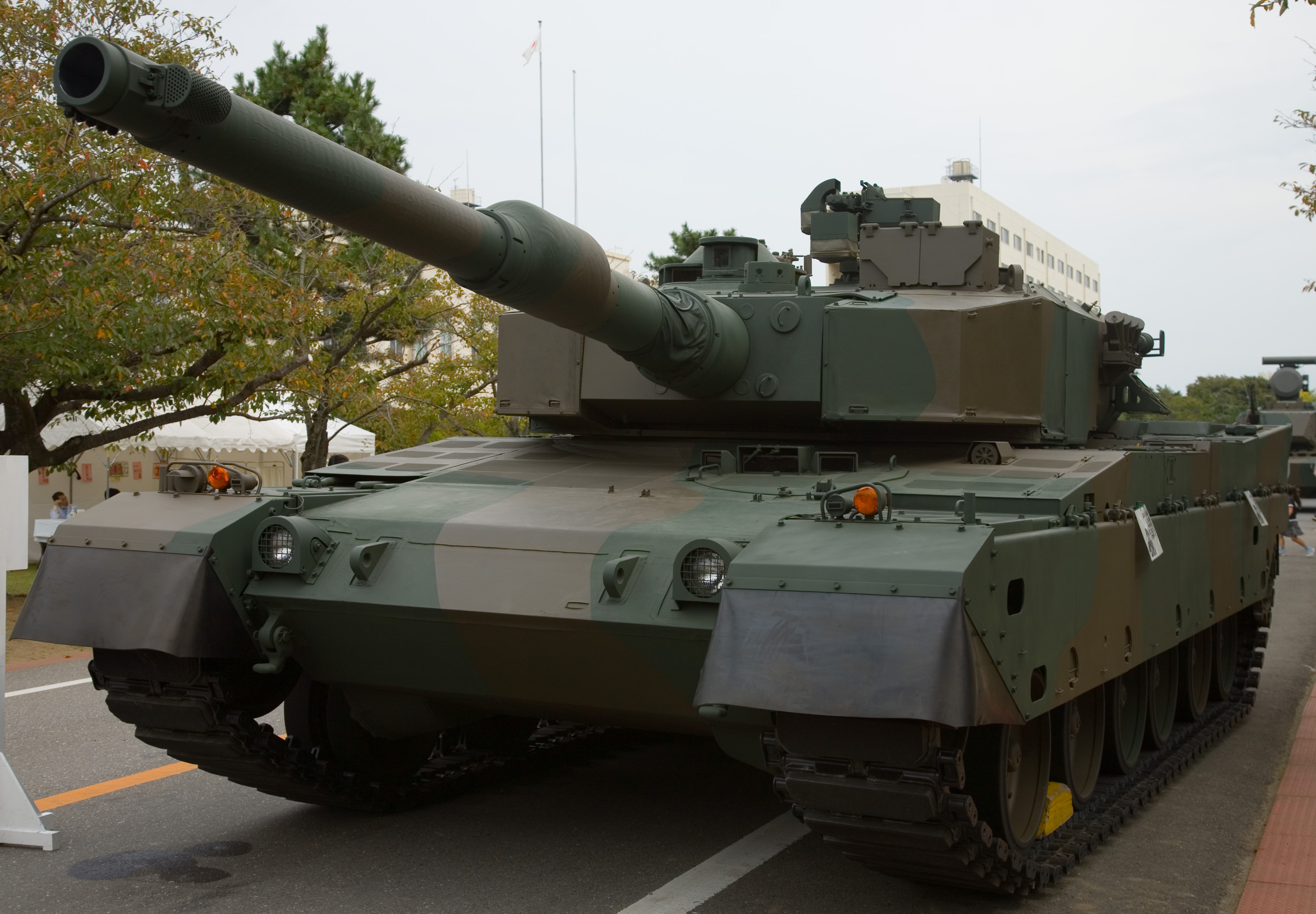
JGSDF Type 90 tank

The Type 90 tank (90式戦車, Kyūmarushikisensha) is the current main battle tank (MBT) of the Japan Ground Self-Defense Force (JGSDF). It is built by Mitsubishi Heavy Industries and was designed as a replacement for all deployed Type 61s and a portion of their Type 74 tanks; it entered service in 1990. It is slated to be complemented by the Type 10. The Type 90 mounts a licensed copy of the German Rheinmetall L44 120 mm smoothbore cannon product by Japan Steel Works Limited. This is the same gun that is mounted on the German Leopard 2, American Abrams, and the South Korean K1A1 tanks. The gun is armed and loaded through a mechanical bustle autoloader (conveyor-belt type), developed by Mitsubishi of Japan. The Type 90 tank is the first western tank to achieve manpower savings by reducing the crew to three through the development of the turret bustle autoloader (With the exception of the turretless Strv 103). This design allows the tank crew to operate without a loader, which allows the use of a smaller turret.

=== Japanese Type 10 tank ===
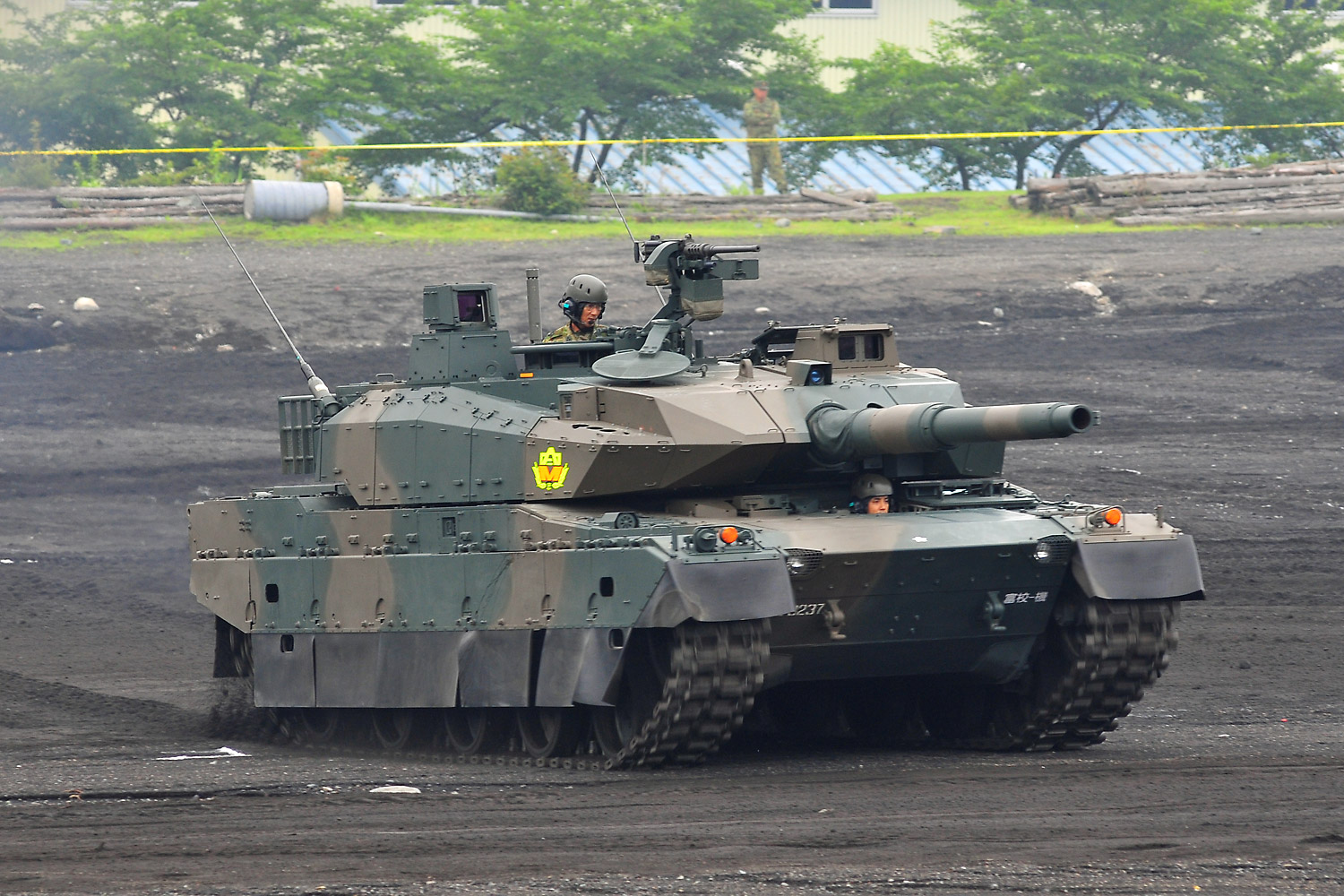
JGSDF Type 10 tank of the 1st Armored Training Unit

The Type 10 (10式戦車, Hitomarushikisensha) is a 4th generation main battle tank produced by Mitsubishi Heavy Industries for the Japanese Ground Self Defense Force (JGSDF). Compared with other currently-serving main battle tanks in the JGSDF, the Type 10 has been equipped with enhancements in its capability to respond to anti-tank warfare and other contingencies. The Type 10 is to replace or complement existing Type 74 and Type 90 main battle tanks that are in service. Development began in the 1990s, with a prototype revealed in February 2008. One of the primary purposes of Type 10 is to be able to deploy anywhere in Japan. Size and weight reductions have made the Type 10 six metric tonnes lighter than the Type 90, thereby 84% of Japan's 17,920 bridges are passable for the Type 10, compared to only 65% for the Type 90 and 40% for mainstream western main battle tanks.

In January 2012, thirteen Type 10 tanks entered JGSDF service. The vehicle's armor consists of modular components, which significantly improves the side armor compared to the Type 90. Whereas the Type 90 used the same 120mm Rheinmetall main gun as other Western powers, the Type 10 uses a completely new gun, developed indigenously by Japan Steel Works. In addition to all standard 120 mm NATO ammunition and the JM33 APFSDS, the gun fires the newly developed type 10 APFSDS. The Type 10 APFSDS is specifically designed for and can only be fired by the Type 10 tank's gun.

== See also ==
- History of the tank
- Tanks in World War I
- List of interwar armoured fighting vehicles
- Tanks in World War II
- Tank classification
- List of military vehicles
