= Type 91 heavy tank =

Japanese heavy tank prototype

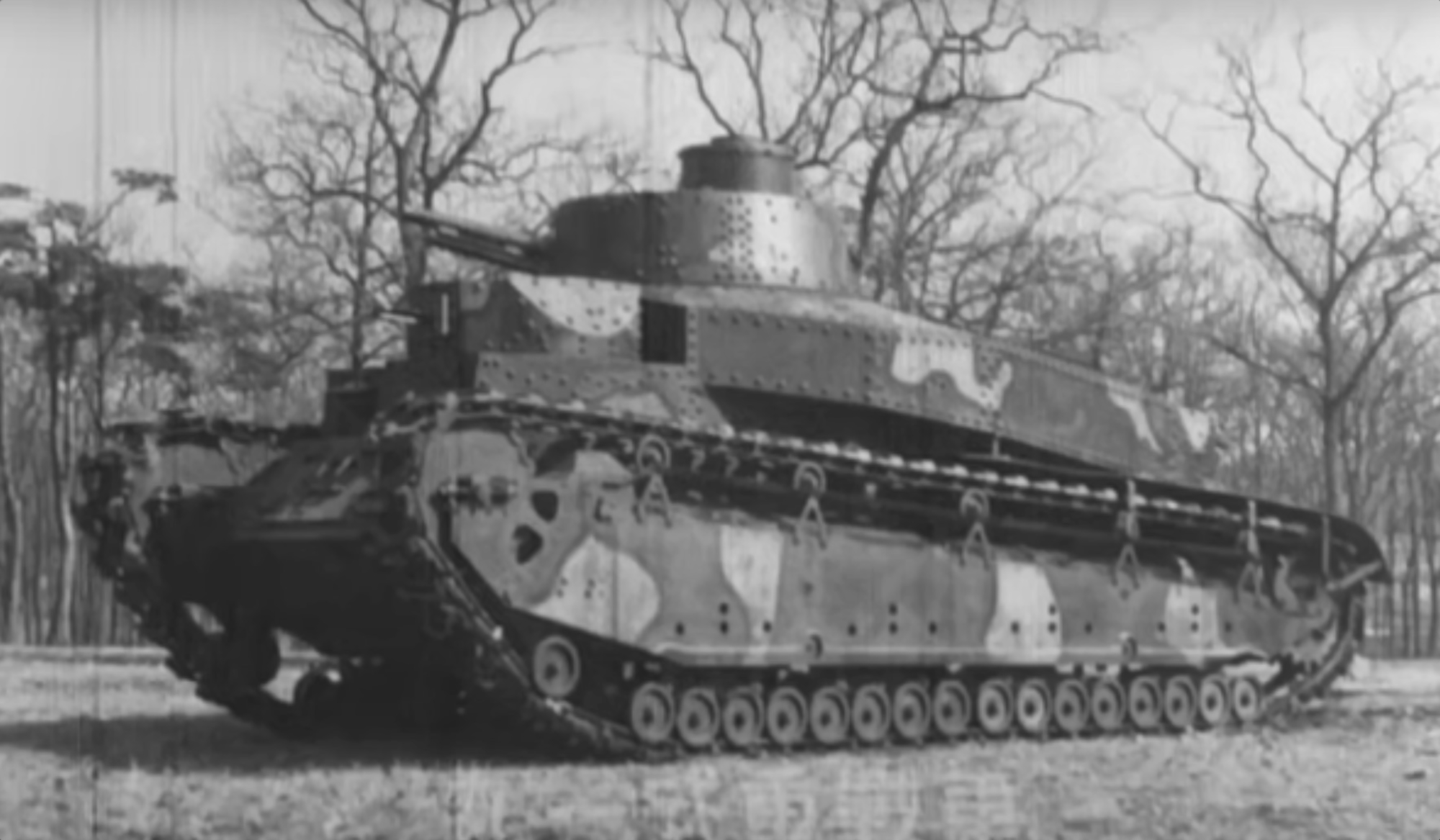
- Type: Heavy tank
- Place of origin: Empire of Japan

Specifications
- Mass: 18 t (20 short tons)
- Length: 6.30 m (20.7 ft)
- Width: 2.47 m (8.1 ft)
- Height: 2.57 m (8.4 ft)
- Crew: 5
- Armor: 17 mm
- Main armament: 1x Type 90 57 mm cannon
- Secondary armament: 3x 6.5 mm MG
- Engine: Inline 6-cylinder BMW gasoline engine 224 hp
- Suspension: leaf spring
- Operational range: 160 km
- Maximum speed: 25 km/h (16 mph)

The Type 91 heavy tank was a Japanese multi-turreted tank design and was in commission during the time period between World War I and World War II. The central turret had a main armament a Type 90 57 mm cannon and a 6.5 mm machine gun. Its secondary front turret mounted a 6.5 mm machine gun and its rear turret also had a 6.5 mm machine gun. One prototype was produced in 1931 and field tested. However, it was determined to be under armed and under armoured. The Type 91 project was cancelled in favor of a subsequent modified multi-turreted tank design known as the Type 95 heavy tank.

== History ==
After World War I, major powers around the world quickly adopted the revolutionary design of French Renault FT light tank. One of the most successful features on the Renault FT was a 360-degree rotating turret. While developing new single-turreted tanks more closely based on the Renault FT, many countries, including Japan, also experimented with the possibility of multi-turreted designs.

== Design and development ==
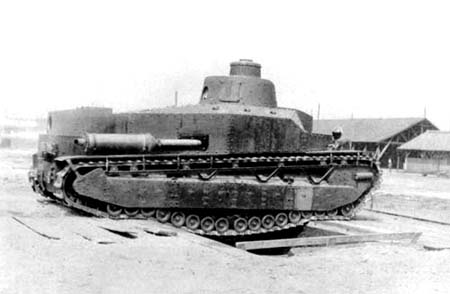
Rear angle view of Type 91 at the Osaka Arsenal, without its guns mounted

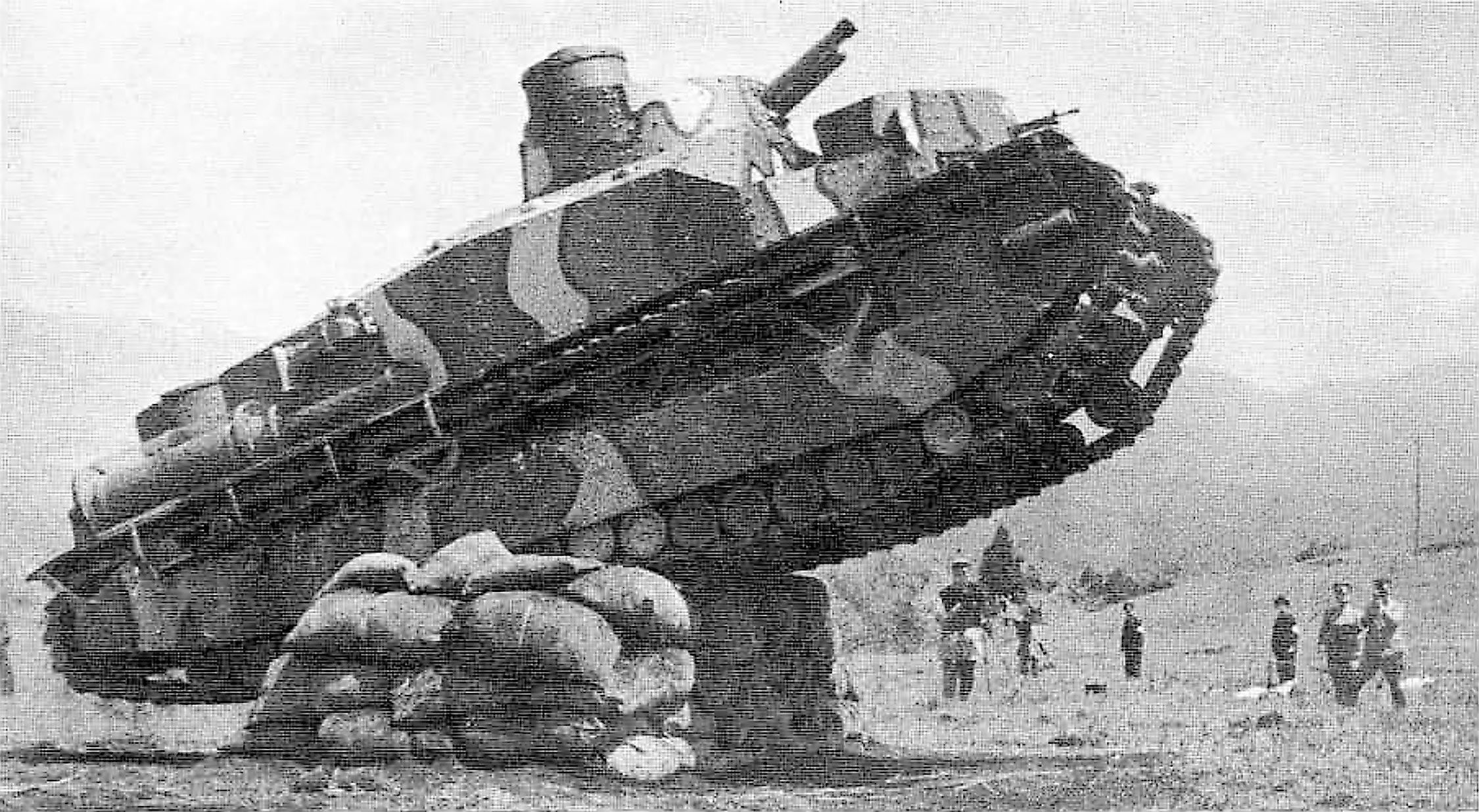
Type 91 climbing an obstacle during field testing at the Fuji training ground

The Imperial Japanese Army made the decision to develop heavy combat vehicles, which was prompted by the increasing threat posed by the Soviet Union, a potential enemy of Japan in East Asia. The designers were influenced by German, Italian and mainly Soviet tank designs for a heavy tank that could break through the front lines of the enemy.

In 1931, the Osaka Arsenal produced a prototype heavy tank that was designated as the Type 91 (Imperial year 2591). It was an 18-ton, multi-turret tank with a BMW IV inline 6-cylinder gasoline engine producing 224 hp. The Type 91 main central turret had a 57 mm cannon and an 6.5 mm machine gun. The turret had a commander's cupola and inter-tank communication was through a voice tube. It had two smaller auxiliary turrets each mounting a 6.5 mm machine gun. One auxiliary turret was located in the front section of the hull and the other was located in the rear section of the hull. The tank had a maximum armour plate thickness of 17 mm; same as the prior Type 87 Chi-I prototype tank. It had seventeen road wheels on each side, which were supported by a "two-stage leaf spring suspension system". Although the tank underwent numerous field tests, it was considered to be underpowered, under-armed and lacked sufficient armour. Although the Type 91 project was canceled, it did lead to the development of the prototype Type 95 heavy tank.

=== Development of the successor Type 95 ===
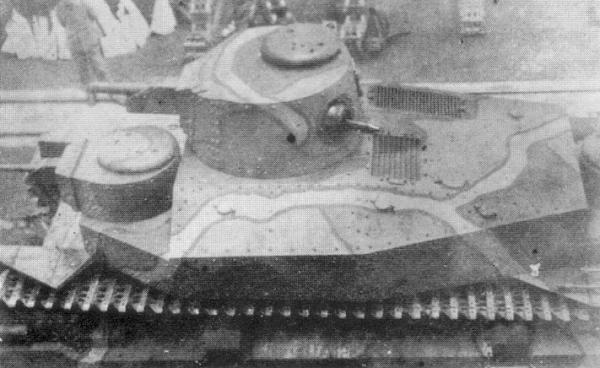
Close-up of the Type 95 tank turrets

The development of a new multi-turreted tank started in 1932 and was completed in 1934. It was designated the Type 95 heavy tank. The overall design of the Type 95 followed the earlier Type 91, but with modifications. The modifications included thicker armour, significantly improved firepower with a 70 mm Type 94 main gun and a 37 mm gun in the front auxiliary turret. It had a more powerful engine and its suspension system was modified from that of the Type 91. While still using a leaf spring suspension, it had only nine road wheels on each side. It was the heaviest Japanese tank at the time, weighing in at 26 tonne. However, the multi-turreted tank concept project was cancelled, so neither the Type 91 or Type 95 went into production. Each proved to be a complicated, cumbersome design with poor mobility and a lower top speed than was desired.

== See also ==
- Tanks of Japan
