= List of Konpeki no Kantai episodes =

The following is a list of episodes from the alternate history OVA series Konpeki no Kantai and Kyokujitsu no Kantai, respectively known as the Deep Blue Fleet and Fleet of the Rising Sun. The series features a technologically advanced Imperial Japanese Navy and a different World War II that was brought about by Japanese Admiral Isoroku Yamamoto's revival in the past due to unexplained circumstances.

The 32 episodes of Konpeki no Kantai were released from 1993 to 2003, and the 15 episodes of Kyokujitsu no Kantai were released from 1997 to 2002.

== Production team ==
From episode 25 on, the planning for Konpeki no Kantai was done by Sanae Mitsugi, series composition was done by Ryōsuke Takahashi and character design was done by Masami Suda. The series was directed by Takeyuki Kanda and Hiromichi Matano. The producers for Konpeki no Kantai were Hiromichi Matano, Osamu Sekita, Rei Mano and Takeshi Yamaguchi. The producers for Kyokujitsu no Kantai were Takeshi Yamaguchi, Hideki Okamoto, and Hirokazu Yamada. Writers for Konpeki no Kantai were Yoshio Aramaki and Ryousuke Takahashi, and they were joined for Kyokujitsu no Kantai by Yuichiro Takeda. Animation production for Konpeki no Kantai was handled by J. C. Staff.

== Episode list ==
No.	Title
1	"The War of Destiny"; Transliteration: "Unmei no kaisen" (Japanese: 運命の開戦)
In the prologue, scenes are shown of Japan's eventual defeat after Admiral Isoroku Yamamoto dies on April 18, 1943, but the clock winds back to May 28, 1905 Yamamoto discovers that he has somehow been transported back in time (or to a parallel world). Having retained his original memory and his old surname of Takano, Yamamoto meets with a select group of Navy officers and propose a coup d'etat against the militarist regime. After he narrowly avoids an assassination attempt plotted by warlords in the Imperial Japanese Army (IJA), he meets IJA Lt Gen Yasaburo Otaka (who is also transported back in time) and explains his rationale for the coup while planning a massive naval rearmament project. All the while, Germany plunges Europe into war and the Tripartite Pact is signed. Yamamoto launches the coup a few days after the Pearl Harbor strike force leaves Hitokappu Bay. With Tojo being held at gunpoint, Otaka becomes the new prime minister, who plans things to ensure that the 14-part message detailing a break in the US-Japanese peace negotiations is successfully delivered and announced to the media two hours before the attack begins at 5AM Hawaiian time on December 7. The Japanese fleet regroups to find and eliminate the US Pacific Fleet out in Hawaiian waters and lands amphibious forces in Hawaii - all in the space of two days.
2	"The Bombing of the Panama Canal"; Transliteration: "Panama unga bakugeki su" (Japanese: パナマ運河爆撃す)
Concerned about the possible redeployment of the US fleet from the Atlantic, the IJN launches an airstrike on the Panama Canal using their submarine-carrier forces (the titular Deep Blue Fleet) on January 13, 1942. The attack, which is carried out by Raiyo floatplane bombers and escorted by Shunran fighters, blasts open the locks and deals severe damage to the canal. The sub force heads back to an underground sub pen at Jaluit in the Caroline Islands.
3	"The First Air Raid"; Transliteration: "Teito Hatsu kūshū" (Japanese: 帝都初空襲)
Kazuyuki Maebara, the commander of the Panama Canal attack force, heads back to Tokyo to be congratulated by Prime Minister Otaka. He returns to the Carolines for a patrol of the North Pacific waters south of the Aleutians and establishes a radar picket line. The line detects US B-30 bombers on an air raid over Tokyo on April 18, 1942. Yamamoto prefers to watch it happen instead of heading to an air-raid shelter. However, the IJAAF has a surprise in store for the bombers: the new Sourai high-altitude interceptor.
4	"The Tensen Strategy Issue"; Transliteration: "tengen sakusen hatsurei" (Japanese: 天元作戦発令)
On May 17, 1942, the US deploys a fleet from out of Dutch Harbor to engage the Japanese. IJN Admiral Eisaku Takasugi sorties his fleet from Hawaii and splits it into two flotillas: one to face the US while the second attacks Dutch Harbor. Dogfights break out between the US and Japanese force. When a single US plane divebombs the Akagi, the main guns of Takasugi's flagship unleashes a new weapon that vaporizes an inbound US airstrike. He personally flies to the US flagship, the aircraft carrier USS Lake Superior, to negotiate the US withdrawal from the area.
5	"Gift Horse Torres Strait"; Transliteration: "Toresu kaikyō fūsa sakusen" (Japanese: トレス海峡封鎖作戦)
Japan's Special Naval Landing Forces train for their amphibious operations in the South Pacific. When the operations get underway on September 13, the IJN's new I-900-class submarine amphibious transports sortie from the Carolines while anti-submarine flying boats launch from the Gilbert Islands to provide armed reconnaissance. The SNLF first strikes the Samoas, eliminating the US garrison in American Samoa and launching humanitarian aid projects for people in nearby Samoa. Two months later, Japanese ships and the new Ro-200 littoral operations submarine patrol eastward from the Netherlands East Indies to the Solomon Islands. Maebara's fleet ambushes Arnold Fletcher's taskforce in bad weather along the Torres Strait, sinking the USS Saratoga and USS Wasp. The advance concerns US General Lewis McArthur who fails to make a case for retaking the Philippines despite his "I shall return" pledge.
6	"Tasman Battle Blow"; Transliteration: "Ichigeki gōchin Tasuman kaisen" (Japanese: 一撃轟沈タスマン海戦)
In December 1942, US President Henry Roosevelt orders the launch of the B-32 Flying Devil bomber in an attack against Pearl Harbor as Admiral Morgan takes command of the US fleet launching from Sydney, Australia, to head to New Caledonia's Loyalty Islands. When Maebara's task force launches planes on February 8, 1943, backed up by a support force of flying boats and the I-1000 seaplane tender submarine, the US fleet tries to scramble out of the area - right into a trap full of CAPTOR mines. The Japanese forces close in for the kill, with Admiral Morgan laying helpless as the entire fleet is destroyed.
7	"Christmas Island Cheat"; Transliteration: "kurisumasu tō kōryaku" (Japanese: クリスマス島攻略)
Three days after the New Caledonia ambush, the Japanese fleet under Admiral Takasugi is warned of the B-32 raid for Hawaii and heads to the area to intercept, but have to contend with inbound B-17s and P-51s first while bombing Christmas Island in Kiribati. Noticing that the B-17s are dropping mines, Takasugi sees that his fleet were trapped so that the US could send B-32 Flying Battleships (B-32s modified as gunships) against his fleet. His own flagship is severely damaged by the lead gunship (as are other ships in the force), but not before he fires his vaporizer weapon at the bombers. One of the B-32 fuselages is recovered intact by an I-1000 and sent to Japan for further analysis. The B-32s successfully bomb Pearl Harbor and recover at an improvised airstrip on Christmas Island, but Takasugi, who has transferred his flag to the battleship Hiei, correctly deduces their recovery location and exact his revenge as the planes land, using shells equipped with anti-runway charges.
8	"Bomb Prevention Strategy"; Transliteration: "genbaku soshi sakusen" (Japanese: 原爆阻止作戦)
The Japanese carry out a second strike on the Panama Canal on November 19, 1943. However, the raid is a warmup as a second Japanese flotilla of Ocean Whale-class tender boats using the new Bakuryu fighter bomber launches "Operation Crescent Moon", a long-range strike of the Manhattan Project's Los Alamos complex, which has a rather explosive conclusion. The Bakuryu motherships also bombard San Diego Naval Base. A month earlier, Maebara's task force sends two planes to drop peace leaflets on Washington and a dummy bomb on the White House lawn, sending President Henry Roosevelt in fits of rage compounded by his heart condition. The planes also airdrop Japanese newspaper reporter Hideo Ozaki, who sends a sealed letter to Daily Washington publisher Harriman. The letter states a message that shocks the Americans. When news of the Los Alamos strike reaches the White House, Roosevelt dies of a heart attack because he could not take the strain anymore.
9	"Operation of the Arctic Orient"; Transliteration: "tenkyoku sakusen hatsudō" (Japanese: 天極作戦発動)
Despite being allies at first, Otaka correctly figures out that Nazi Germany would use its military might to go to war against Japan. The Japanese realize the threat and prepare for their first thrust: a trans-polar air raid on the Germans' nuclear weapons development facility at Nuremberg, using the Fuji "aerial battleship" flying boat. Albert Einstein is revealed to be working for the Japanese, Duke Kokonoe having successfully negotiated an offer to provide sanctuary to the Jews to escape the Final Solution. The new sanctuary, called the Oriental Republic of Jerusalem, is established in 1944.
10	"Great Ship Invasion of Europe"; Transliteration: "chō kyotei ōshū wo tobu" (Japanese: 超巨艇欧州を翔ぶ)
On September 10, 1944, the three-plane Fuji assault force pulls off the attack on the German nuke facilities, using a new weapon - infrared smart bombs. The raid coincides with an inbound British air raid that is easily beaten off by the Luftwaffe's Me 262 and Messerschmitt Me 163 fighters. On the way out, the Fuji team is waylaid by He 162 planes but use their afterburner engines to escape them, with a recovery team standing by in the South Atlantic. Meanwhile, Bill Truman - who took over the US presidency after Roosevelt's death - is not concerned with the Nazis' technological advancement. Hitler is angry at Luftwaffe chief Erhardt Goering for failing to adequately defend the nuclear facility.
11	"Newly Equipped Deep Blue Fleet Combat Mission"; Transliteration: "shinsō konpeki kantai shutsugeki" (Japanese: 新装紺碧艦隊出撃)
Otaka is counseled by Oriental Strategy Institute chief Kanji Sachihara about further strategic moves for Japan. Maebara visits Shanghai to meet a contact while the Deep Blue Fleet (now upgraded with anechoic tiles and vertical-launch missiles) deploys for Madagascar where the Wehrmacht lands an occupation force. His contact turns out to be Bose, a man who fled persecution in Germany and now seeks help in liberating the island. Concerned over the potential danger of the Kriegsmarine's threat in the Indian Ocean, the Royal Navy's forces in India sortie to retake the island with help from the new Fleet of the Rising Sun, led by the battleship Yamato Takeru.
12	"Winds of Madagascar"; Transliteration: "fūun madagasukaru" (Japanese: 風雲マダガスカル)
As the Japanese-British fleet gets closer to Madagascar, they fight off attacks from Luftwaffe units, including the new Jormungand intercontinental bomber. The Maebara force also mines the German submarine base in Diego Suarez and attacks bases just outside Antananarivo and Tamatav while amphibious forces land in Farafangana, Manansari, and Fordofan, where commando units link up with rebels in liberating a nearby slave labor camp.
13	"Superheavy Bomber Interception Mission"; Transliteration: "doku chō jū bakugeki ki yougeki sakusen" (Japanese: 独超重爆撃機要撃作戦)
A Zero air-defense patrol over Japan stumbles upon a flight of heavy aircraft that the pilots mistake for enemy bombers. However, the planes turn out to be the new Ranbyu ("Dragon Storm") interceptors, which are equipped with 16 vertical-firing 20mm cannons. The planes were out for an operational test against an inbound flight of Jormungands, which are virtually ripped to shreds under the barrage. The IJAAF also tests a new high-speed point-defense interceptor (patterned after the real-life MXY7 Ohka) against another flight of Jormungands over the Sea of Japan. Sorai fighters out of Sado Island make short work of the survivors.
14	"Operation Red Sea Lightning"; Transliteration: "kōkai raigeki sakusen" (Japanese: 紅海雷撃作戦)
Maebara grants a day of liberty to his men and they enjoy a time on the beach. They later redeploy to the Bab el-Mandeb to ambush a Kriegsmarine task force bound for the Indian Ocean to relieve German forces trapped in Madagascar. A German radar station is Djibouti is destroyed and Kriegsmarine admiral Wilhelm Jodl goes down with his fleet.
15	"Sally the Naruto Sea Fortress"; Transliteration: "kaichū yōsai Naruto shutsugeki" (Japanese: 海中要塞鳴門出撃)
In January 1945, a US patrol plane stumbles upon a supposedly circular-shaped island just south of Mexico. It is actually the Naruto, a fleet of giant submarines that interlock to form a massive sea fortress. Meanwhile, the Germans send the new UX-99 cruiser-class U-boat to shell a US nuclear research base in Angel dela Guarda island in Baja California. As it tries to head for open water, Maebara goads the UX-99's captain, Friedrich von Gottschalk, to a surface duel. Just as the U-boat prepares to fire its cannons, the Naruto suddenly surfaces under the submarine, throwing the crew off balance as they are captured.
16	"Rear Admiral Maehara in Crisis!"; Transliteration: "maehara shōshō kiki ippatsu!" (Japanese: 前原少将危機一髪!)
The US decides to intensify its intelligence operations in Japan, with Maebara being put under surveillance. He is almost assassinated while on a trip to Shanghai and aboard a trans-continental train, where he tries to confront the assassin. The assassin leaps off the train rather than talk. When one of Maebara's contacts is revealed to be a double agent working for the US and tries to kill him as well, Yoshiko Kawashu - a secret agent under the guise of a movie actress - saves him and they disarm a bomb that was meant to explode at the next stop.
17	"Large Dark Cloud Over the Indian Ocean!"; Transliteration: "anun indo yō nami takashi !" (Japanese: 暗雲印度洋浪高し!)
British Prime Minister Keiston Churchill flies to Japan for a summit meeting with Otaka. An Indian official named Gupta seeks help from Otaka for reinforcements to bolster India's defense against a German invasion force already mobilizing in the Middle East. Japan deploys a convoy of Kuroshio-class transports to India under heavy escort while antisubmarine forces ward off any U-boats detected in the vicinity. One of the U-boats, the U-3100, single-handedly destroys a small flotilla led by Lt Cdr Hiroshi Kawasaki, but it is later sunk. The convoy's aim is to reach a C-shaped island in the Laccadive group.
18	"Destruction of the Underwater Attack Fleet"; Transliteration: "senmetsu doitsu suichū shūgeki kantai" (Japanese: 殱滅・独逸水中襲撃艦隊)
Having determined that there are at least six U-boats in the area south of Ceylon, the convoy, led by Heihachiro Togo, deploys its ASW forces again. The Kriegsmarine's most advanced U-boat, the U-3333, is one of the victims. The fleet's main flagship, an aircraft cruiser, also claims three U-boats - two are hit by large-caliber shells equipped with drill warheads while it runs over the third (with the crew originally believing they were hit by a torpedo; the U-boat was at periscope depth). The entire U-boat force is eliminated at the cost of only one destroyer.
19	"Hot Blast, the Indian Sub-continent!"; Transliteration: "neppū, indo atairiku!" (Japanese: 熱風、印度亜大陸!)
The Japanese convoy arrives at the Laccadives. The materials they carry are used for building the Deep Blue Fleet's new forward base. Maebara arrives in Cochin with a team of soldiers to assess the situation, and meets with Gen Masatoshi Kumagai, an IJA commander in Hyderabad who supervises the local deployment of a special armored division, the Night Panthers (with the tanks resembling the real-life Type 61).
20	"A Shock and the Remaining Overnight Corps Combat Mission!"; Transliteration: "dengeki, ronmeru gundan shutsugeki !" (Japanese: 電撃, ロンメル軍団出撃!)
Maebara has an audience with Indian independence advocate Suavi Gandhi. German Field Marshal Konrad von Rommel spearheads the Wehrmacht's invasion of India, with the Maharaja too eager to offer him gifts and Ahmedabad the first main objective. At the same time, Germany launches Operation Sea Lion under a massive barrage of railway guns.
21	"The Super Class Aircraft Carrier Building, it Soars Like Thunder!"; Transliteration: "chō dokyū kūbo takemikazuchi shutsugeki su !" (Japanese: 超弩級空母建御雷出撃す!)
The Deep Blue Fleet sorties to Ahmedabad to at least delay the German advances, stopping a U-boat along the way. However, the Wehrmacht blasts through the defenses and Lord Mountbatten is running out of options. The IJN unveils the massive Takemikazuchi aircraft carrier as the crown jewel of a new carrier battle group. Admiral Takasugi, who is the battle group's commander, leads the fleet to Hawaii, where he signs an agreement to withdraw Japanese occupation forces and return the islands to US control. Meanwhile, in Washington, Truman cedes power in a silent coup hatched by MacArthur and Eisenhower.
22	"Three-dimensional Maneuvers!"; Transliteration: "rikukai rittai sakusen kamaitachi!" (Japanese: 陸海立体作戦カマイタチ!)
Because of the coup, the US finally signs a peace treaty with Japan, with Foreign Minister Takayoshi Kido getting praised by Otaka. The IJA sets up a defensive line just north of Cochin spanning the west and east coast. British troops from Bombay, Jabalpur, and Nagpur try to stem the Germans' advance to Berar province, having captured Jargaon city using forces under Generalmajor Fritz von Lipps. When Rommel's forces make another push, the Japanese prepare for a counterstrike.
23	"The Battle of the Deccan Plateau"; Transliteration: "dekan kōgen kōbōsen" (Japanese: デカン高原攻防戦)
The IJA lures Von Lipps' forces south from Jabalpur. The move is actually a feint, as the Japanese outflank the advance from staging areas in the bushes outside Jargaon and ambush an armored column using tanks and artillery. IJN and RAF ground-attack fighters pound the column while the Japanese unleash their heavy jamming on the Germans. Takasugi's fleet deploys jet bombers to attack Von Lipps' base in Jargaon. Kawasaki's force in the Arabian Sea launches two Kouryus (Shark Dragon; swing-wing jet versions of the Bakuryu fighter-bomber) on a surgical strike at Rommel's headquarters in New Delhi.
24	"A Decisive battle! The Indian South Fortress"; Transliteration: "kessen ! indo nanpō yousai" (Japanese: 決戦!印度南方要塞)
Rommel, who saw the Kouryu missile hit his headquarters, survives the attack, as Von Lipps' force surrenders to the British (after being cut off in a pincer attack). The surgical strike does not stop the Germans from pushing the British and Japanese all the way to the southern sections of India past Bangalore. Otaka flies to the US for meetings with US military leader Gen Eisenhower. The talks result in the US Marines being deployed to Ceylon for an amphibious landing behind enemy lines on the Indian east coast. German commander Gen Hauessen pushes his forces to Tintigur near Cochin, but B-30 bombers loaned by the US to Japan, plus the Takasugi fleet's carrier fighters, ravage the armored thrust. A Japanese tank force slips behind the German forces and attacks. Hauessen dies when a tank shell directly hits his command vehicle. The remaining German forces surrender. Meanwhile, Japanese special forces attack Hitler's command center in Berchtesgaden, but the fuhrer survives under the rubble.
25	"The Formation of the Holy European Empire"; Transliteration: "shinsei ōshū teikoku seiritsu" (Japanese: 神聖欧州帝国成立)
Maebara flies out to the Takemikazuchi for meetings with Admiral Takasugi, who reveals that the US has expanded its coverage in the Bay of Bengal as the Nazis sweep up eastern India and get close to Indochina. The US launches "Operation Viking" (the series' counterpart of Operation Overlord) on September 9, 1948, under a cover of B-32 strikes, but the Germans put up a fierce resistance. The US and Japanese forces in southern India, on the other hand, break out and push the Germans back north. Hitler blames the command center attack on Goering, who is executed along with Generals Ludendorff and Hindenburg at Auschwitz. Walter Manteuffel steps up as Hitler's new military commander. Meanwhile, a giant submarine is taking shape at the IJN shipyard in Muroran.
26	"The Manchurian Inspection Spy Line"; Transliteration: "manshū shisatsu onmitsukō" (Japanese: 満州視察隠密行)
With the stabilization of the Indian front, the Wehrmacht turns their attention to the Urals and to Siberia, threatening Nerovitch Stalin and the rest of the Soviet holdouts. Rommel's forces move through the Pamirs in the direction of Tashkent to hit the Soviets from the south while other German units attack the Soviet lines west of the Urals. Otaka asks Deputy Prime Minister Saigo Takamori to assume his duties while he joins Maebara in traveling by train to Hairar in Manchukuo then to Lake Baikal. After an overflight of a secret intelligence station somewhere in the steppes, Maebara meets Communist icon Leon Trokki and discusses something important with him.
27	"The Super Hiding Armored Submarine, Heaven's it Goes North!"; Transliteration: "chō hitoku sensuikan kiten hokushin seyo!" (Japanese: 超秘匿潜水艦亀天北進せよ!)
Manteuffel reveals his plan to defeat the Japanese. Codenamed "Sickle Iron Cross," the plan calls for control of the South Atlantic sea lanes and to establish clear lines of communication to Argentina, which has joined the Third Reich. In late 1949, the Japanese unveil the new I-3000 Kiten super-submarine, with its first voyage to a secret naval base in Iceland, where Maebara reunites with his old Naval Academy classmate, Admiral Oshii. The Germans launch Jormungands modified with jet engines out of Trondheim to attack the Japanese base, but run into heavy flak, Sorai-Kai fighters, and fighters that launch missiles with guided sub-munitions. A separate German attack on the Fleet of the Rising Run prompts Oshii to fire his vaporizer shells at them.
28	"Ah, Battle for Iceland!"; Transliteration: "Aa, aisurando oki kaisen" (Japanese: 嗚呼、アイスランド沖海戦)
The Fleet of the Rising Sun faces another round of attacks by the Kriegsmarine fleet led by Admiral Alfred von Rabe. The two forces clash southeast of Greenland in early December 1949, with the Germans launching their Sea Drakken fighters and ME-462 bombers against the Yamato Takeru. The Japanese in turn, attack the German fleet carriers. Aboard the German flagship Lothringen, Von Rabe is considering withdrawing, but his junior, Wilhelm Rosenberg, knocks him out with a pistol whip and orders the battleships to cross the T and fire at the Yamato Takeru. However, the ship avoids the barrages using its advanced turbofan thrusters and special anti-torpedo cannons, allowing enough time for the I-3000 to get through and destroy the battleships. Meanwhile, the Germans push back the Allied invasion of Europe (despite the US launching a second invasion, named Operation Nirvana) and force an armistice on them. They also complete their conquest of southern England.
29	"Overture for the Growing Battle!"; Transliteration: "kessen muke te, jokyoku takamaru !" (Japanese: 決戦向けて、序曲高まる!)
Rommel's mechanized forces tighten the grip on Stalin's forces in the winter of 1949. Hitler and Manteuffel consider purging Rommel when he completes the rout of the Soviets' Ural fortress. However, some dissident Nazis eavesdrop on the plan and alert the Japanese, who send IJA Maj Yoshiaki Hongo as a courier to talk to Rommel. Faced with the threat of assassination by Nazi loyalists in the Wehrmacht, Rommel encourages a good portion of his forces to join him in leaving the main invasion army. They cross the Altai mountains and head to safety in Ulaanbaatar despite heavy winter conditions. He is extracted to Japan for a meeting with Otaka about establishing a Free German government-in-exile. On May 1, 1950 the People's Republic of East Siberia is established at Khabarovsk with Leon Trokki as its first Premier. As Maebara returns to Jaluit, Takasugi visits the submarine base.
30	"Battle for the Equator"; Transliteration: "Sekidō dai kaisen" (Japanese: 赤道大海戦)
The I-3000 sends underwater commandos to attack a German communications base on Ascension Island to deter German movements in the South Atlantic. An Enigma codebook captured during the raid helps Maebara create a fake message to force the Germans to divide their ships, allowing the Japanese to wreak havoc with ease. The SNLF also invades St Helena. The Luftwaffe rolls out the new Do 317 Ares delta-wing strategic bomber as part of Operation "Sickle Iron Cross." The US decides to send military forces to Argentina, but are cut to ribbons by U-boats. Elsewhere, the Soviets finally capitulate, but it is not known if Stalin killed himself.
31	"Iron Cross and Sickle"; Transliteration: "Tetsujūji (Hākenkuroitsu) no kama" (Japanese: 鉄十字（ハーケンクロイツ）の鎌)
Admiral Takasugi and Commander Kawasaki meet Macarthur in Madagascar to discuss future combat missions. The Germans launch Operation "Sickle Iron Cross" using their squadron of Ares bombers flying out of Mauritania plus a fleet deploying from the south of France. Manteuffel, who is personally commanding the operation from a base in Nouakchott, said the plan's success relies on the elimination of the Yamato Takeru, which helms the fleet just 120 kilometers from Dakar. The Japanese attack the German ships while docked at a naval base by triggering an oil spill at the harbor and lighting them up. Any ship that tries to get out is destroyed. The bombers deal moderate damage to the Japanese fleet with their onboard rocket launchers. The Yamato Takeru fights off the Ares bombers and an Angrboda II flying-wing bomber with its AA weapons. The battleship is being targeted by several German torpedoes, but the I-3000 goes full throttle to shake them off. In the Siberian front, the Japanese and the Nationalist Chinese prepare to stop the German forces getting closer to Lake Baikal as Otaka (now back in his IJA uniform as commander of the new Asian Defense Force) observes the front from a command center in Harbin. Meanwhile, plans for a peace treaty with the Third Reich are being formulated.
32	"The Dawn of Asia"; Transliteration: "Ajia no akebono" (Japanese: 亜細亜の曙)
The "Sickle Iron Cross" strike force deals much damage to the Japanese fleet in the Atlantic and Indian Oceans (including the loss of the Takemikazuchi just north of Madagascar) and Admiral Oshii reorganizes the survivors. The Japanese also evacuate the population of Tristan da Cunha. Manteuffel declares his victory over the fleet to Hitler, who suddenly fumes that he failed after reading a newspaper that features the Yamato Takeru's arrival in New York on a goodwill visit. He has Manteuffel executed by the SS. A German column in the Tian Shan mountains is ambushed by IJA attack helicopters and Mongolian Tiger tanks in a delaying action, to buy time for strategic bombers to go in for the kill. In England, Japanese and British forces push on to liberate London. With the successful stopping of the Germans, Japan joins the US and Britain in Muscat for peace talks with Nazi Germany, which is a success (despite the Third Reich keeping much of its territory and forced to leave all of Siberia). As the war ends in late 1950 (with Hitler plotting his revenge), the Yamato Takeru and the I-3000 are sent into dry dock for maintenance in preparation for another war.
Special	"Secret Launch of the Sorai"; Transliteration: "Sōrai kaihatsu monogatari" (Japanese: 蒼莱開発物語)
Reflecting on the level of US aerial bombardment of Japan in his previous life, Yamamoto proposes a new interceptor, the Sourai, that can successfully take down an expected attack. In early 1940, an engineer and his brother (a test pilot) are assigned the job of developing the plane under tight secrecy. When the prototype is rolled out in late 1941, the test pilot pushes it to the limit by going as high as 10,000 meters. The episode is a backstory to the third episode.

== Kyokujitsu no Kantai ==
The series is a sidestory to Konpeki no Kantai, released in 1997. It further details the story of the IJN's Atlantic fleet, codenamed the Fleet of the Rising Sun, that first appeared in Konpeki no Kantai episode 12.

No.	Title
1	"Super Battleship Yamato Takeru Departs"; Transliteration: "chō senkan yamato takeru shutsugeki" (Japanese: 超戦艦日本武尊出撃)
In the cold opening, a Japanese destroyer eliminates a Kriegsmarine U-boat. Only two people survive the sinking, including the sub's captain, Herman von Otto, and are taken aboard the Fleet of the Rising Sun (FRS) flagship Yamato Takeru. Otto is treated as a guest. After a short refueling at Tristan da Cunha, the FRS mobilizes to attack the German fleet in Gibraltar but not before passing Uruguay, Santos, and Sierra Leone, where Oshii assures African nations of Japan's help in the fight against Nazism. The FRS attacks an airbase in Morocco before heading straight for Gibraltar and Ceuta. At Gibraltar, the Kriegsmarine launches the aircraft carrier Graf Zeppelin, but its maiden voyage is all too brief - it's sunk by CAPTOR mines that Japanese destroyers were able to slip past the anti-torpedo nets.
2	"Yamato Takeru Vs Bismarck II"; Transliteration: "yamato takeru tai bisumaruku nisei" (Japanese: 日本武尊対ビスマルクII世)
Eager for revenge over what happened to the Graf Zeppelin, the Germans deploy a flotilla centered around the super-battleship Bismarck II and the Scharnhorst, targeting the Yamato Takeru. The FRS flagship is seemingly damaged by a U-boat wolfpack, but Admiral Oshii strikes back with special main gun shells that explode over the water and create a shockwave that destroys the wolfpack. When a flock of African reporters who interviewed Oshii in Freetown witness the ship in smoke and apparently sinking, Oshii relays through Morse code that they are trying to trick the Germans using the Yamato Takeru's semi-submersible capability and smoke generators to appear dead in the water. The deception works, as the massive battleship rises to its full height and uses its pumpjet thrusters to outrace the Germans. Its first volley instantly claims the Scharnhorst and subsequent barrages slowly crush the Bismarck II, winning over the reporters about Japan's sincerity. Meanwhile, Hitler attends the rollout of the Gelman railway gun and is thrown off balance as the cannon fires a demo shot that destroys a target ship. The fuhrer is satisfied, as he has ideas of using it on England.
3	"Gibraltar's Great Gunfire"; Transliteration: "kyohō meidō jiburarutaru" (Japanese: 巨砲鳴動ジブラルタル)
Oshii turns over command of the Yamato Takeru to a junior officer for a short duration. The FRS returns to Gibraltar for another attack. The Yamato Takeru - actually a seaworthy proof-of-concept model called the Tagarasu - charges headlong into the German defenses at Gibraltar, but the Germans' shore cannons (based inside caves) fail to sink the ship. It turns out that the ship's charge was meant to allow three Korou-class aircraft cruisers enough time to shoot cluster shells into the cannon positions. Meanwhile, Oshii has dreams about a massive battleship in the middle of a heavy storm.
4	"Air Raids on Mainland Germany"; Transliteration: "doitsu hondo kūshū" (Japanese: 独逸本土空襲)
In January 1946, the Germans unveil the disk-shaped Horus 16 attack aircraft and send two of them against the FRS. The Yamato Takeru fires its vaporizer shells to eliminate the fighters. Soon after, the FRS deploys carrier aircraft to destroy the Luftwaffe air-defense radar network in northwest Germany - which opens a hole for RAF bombers to get in and attack Hamburg (to Goering's consternation). A second Japanese strike sees the new Raishun attack planes destroy the locks in the Kiel Canal and bomb Berlin, particularly Hitler's headquarters.
5	"Germanic Battery Annihilation Battle"; Transliteration: "geruman hōdai senmetsu sen" (Japanese: ゲルマン砲台殲滅戦)
The Raishuns strike Berlin using a bomb version of the Yamato Takeru's vaporizer shells, which torch several buildings in the government quarter. The Berlin fire service is deployed to put out the blazes. Inside Hitler's headquarters, Japanese agent Yoshiaki Hongo, posing as a fireman, takes pictures of several classified German documents and forcibly kidnaps a genuine fireman who almost caught him in the act. Sensing the danger of a Luftwaffe counterattack, the Tagarasu crew evacuate and let the decoy ship absorb the blow, which includes two barrages from the Heracles guns. The crew, who stand on the English coast watching the ship get hit, are amazed that it withstood heavy pounding before it sinks. The attack helps the real Yamato Takeru home in on the cannons and launches cruise missiles to destroy the facility.
6	"Superlift Airship Hakuho"; Transliteration: "chō yu hikōtei hakuhō" (Japanese: 超輸飛行艇白鳳)
In the cold open, the FRS docks at Scapa Flow, where British Queen Margaret presents Admiral Oshii with the Victoria Cross for the fleet's actions against Germany. British Prime Minister Keiston Churchill later commends the admiral and hints at a summit meeting with Prime Minister Otaka. Hongo delivers to Otaka the papers he took pictures of in Germany, which helps the premier commit to a closer partnership with Britain. Japan sends a jet-powered flying boat, the Hakuho, on a goodwill flight to Britain. On the way back, the plane (now laden with British passengers on their first trans-polar flight) has a close call with a US B-32 patrol bomber, but is forced to fight off Ba 372 Shiv rocket fighters launched from the Sleipnir, a German carrier sub lurking on the Arctic ice.
7	"The Night Before Operation Todo Was Launched"; Transliteration: "todo sakusen hatsudō zenya" (Japanese: トド作戦発動前夜)
Hitler's attending a strategy conference when he suddenly decides to rush out of the room in panic. An officer tries to stop him before a bomb explodes. Amazingly, Hitler survives and appears at a gala party. He later launches a crackdown on the German resistance on August 8, 1947. Meanwhile, Japanese Foreign Minister Kido meets Lewis MacArthur in Australia, where the American general is considering a coup d'etat against US President Bill Truman's quasi-isolationist regime.
8	"Landing on the British Mainland Begins"; Transliteration: "ei hondo jōriku kaishi" (Japanese: 英本土上陸開始)
One week after the crackdown in Germany, the Wehrmacht launch their invasion of England under a railway gun barrage from the Cotentin Peninsula. The Japanese destroy the railway guns in a raid codenamed "Operation NC," but the Germans break out of their beachheads within three days of the landings and attack the British in force, with the British sustaining heavy casualties as London is captured. The Japanese contemplate their next move. The episode is also for the most part, a clip show recapping the first seven episodes.
9	"Shadow Empire"; Transliteration: "kage no teikoku" (Japanese: 影の帝国)
In Washington, an American woman is trying to hide from the police. Japanese deep-cover agent Yasuyuki West gets her away from the pursuers. Over hot coffee, the woman, Daily Washington reporter Marie Palmer, tells West that she was running away from her uncle, who caught her perusing some secret documents about a fascist coup (starting with an assassination attempt against Truman). They try to gather more information about the conspiracy (her father, Supreme Court Justice Harold Palmer, is apparently in on it) but the Mob tries to take her away, wounding West in the process. His partner, Ronald Pearl, also a Daily Washington reporter, rescues the two, but later leaves after patching him up. Meanwhile, Hitler sends out Kriegsmarine Rear Adm Christian von Werner on a mission aboard the Sleipnir.
10	"Assassin from the Deep Sea"; Transliteration: "umi kara no ansatsu sha" (Japanese: 深海（うみ）からの暗殺者)
West and Seeger try to talk to Lewis Eisenhower about the shadow government while Pearl continues working in the Daily Washington archives. Harriman sends him to meet Konpeki no Kantai character Hideo Ozaki, who was arrested and sent to federal prison on spying charges after Truman took over. All three men later have an audience with the president, who gives Ozaki a pardon and sends him back to Japan. Ozaki personally witnesses the Japanese handover of Hawaii back to the US. Pearl rejoins West and Seeger as they shadow a Nazi official who is sent ashore from the Sleipnir somewhere in Canada. Further surveillance leads them to a bar, where out of boredom, Marie steps out of the car - and encounters her father, who was meeting with the Nazi. The German tries to kill her but her father dies protecting her. Before passing away, Marie's father entrusts Pearl to take care of her. West catches up with the German, who commits suicide using a bomb on his radio set. West and Pearl join a Coast Guard flotilla in hunting down the Sleipnir in James Bay. The submarine surfaces and launches a Go 686 Magni attack plane. West guesses its target: the White House.
11	"Japan-U.S. Peace Established"; Transliteration: "nichi bei waboku seiritsu" (Japanese: 日米和睦成立)
The Sleipnir launches two more Magnis as the crew fires machineguns to fight off the coast guard. To prevent the sub from submerging, West fires a harpoon into a porthole on the sail, but the sub pulls the ship down. The Magnis head south to a blacked-out Washington DC at high speed then drop to low level just as they fly over the Mall. They move into attack formation and launch their missiles at the White House before heading out east, with the USAAF's P-80s failing to find them. Another Kriegsmarine carrier sub, the S-8501, stands off Bermuda to receive the planes, which lands just as the FRS tracks down the sub. When the Japanese are detected, the S-8501's captain orders an emergency dive even when the planes have not been put down to the hangar deck, but the Japanese missiles still make their mark. As for the Sleipnir, it tries to slip out of Canadian waters, but US patrol planes catch it on the surface as the crew takes the harpoon off the sail. The submarine USS Archerfish closes in to sink the sub. Back in Berlin, Hitler is delighted with the destruction of the White House - until Himmler reports that President Truman was not at home during the attack, and now exhorts the US to go to war as he cedes power to General Eisenhower. Enraged, Hitler fires all rounds in his pistol at a section of a globe where the US is located. The US ambassador to Japan warns Otaka and Takano about Germany developing a nuclear bomb to be detonated in New York.
12	"The Third Reich"; Transliteration: "dai san teikoku hōi mō" (Japanese: 第三帝国包囲網)
The FRS shoots down an Ar 271 Fenrir 99 plane trying to slip past their defenses as the fleet is docked at the Issa Fjord in Iceland. A Japanese commando team clad in Wehrmacht uniforms infiltrates the German headquarters in Brest and captures a top general. A small squadron under the command of the armored cruiser Admiral Hipper sorties from the city and engages a Japanese flotilla. The fleet commander, Hans Ostwald, realizes too late that the Japanese flotilla's lead ship is the Yamato Takeru - seconds before the latter's shells tear the ship apart. Oshii flies back to Japan for further meetings with Otaka and Takano, while German general Walter Manteuffel observes the fleet's actions and continues to work closer in Hitler's circle.
13	"A Fantastic Idea! The Artifice of Reason"; Transliteration: "kisou ! ' risei no jussaku '" (Japanese: 奇想！ 「理性の術策」)
The Japanese-British "Haggis" intelligence group receives information that a German base on the Kola Peninsula is developing the Hoss, a special U-boat powered by Walther engines and designed as a kamikaze submarine that would explode in New York harbor. The FRS launches from Iceland and the Yamato Takeru leads the fleet through the Arctic icepack with its special icebreaking capability. Their aim is to find the Hoss. The FRS later sends ASW planes to help the US Sixth Fleet under attack by U-boats. Meanwhile, the Japanese launch a glider deep into central Germany to airdrop Hongo's commando force on Berchtesgaden.
14	"Assault on the Fuhrer's Fortress"; Transliteration: "sōtō yōsai shūgeki" (Japanese: 総統要塞襲撃)
The Japanese commando team slips into the Eagle's Nest and plants explosives all over the place while a second team disrupts the security barracks. When Manteuffel discovers the body of one sentry, he alerts Hitler of the danger and tries to get him out of his command center before the bombs explode. When the center collapses around them, Manteuffel shields the fuhrer with his body and cups his mouth to prevent discovery from Hongo's troopers, who inspect the remains of the center. Believing Hitler died in the explosion, the team escapes the complex. The FRS attacks the German base in Narvik as Goering is elated about Hitler's presumed death. When the Luftwaffe launches another flight of Horus 16s at the FRS, the fleet retaliates with a cruise missile strike on their bases in Germany. The Hoss is cornered by another Japanese flotilla, causing one of the senior officers to hijack the submarine and surface it to surrender to the Japanese. As Goering and his associates are executed, Hitler rewards Manteuffel for saving him by promoting the Wehrmacht officer to field marshal and becoming his chief of staff.
15	"Dawn's Upstream"; Transliteration: "akatsuki no sojō" (Japanese: 暁の遡上)
In October 1948, Nazi Germany launches a second invasion of England. Codenamed "Operation Rabbit Hop," the invasion is aimed at the Midlands region to cut off British forces in southern England. The FRS comes in to suppress Kriegsmarine vessels in the North Sea supporting the invasion. Churchill expresses confidence in the Japanese fleet's battle capabilities. In the early hours of October 9, 1948, a German column is surprised to see a ship coming out of the fog. It turns out to be the Yamato Takeru, which decimates the column before heading full throttle to Kingston upon Hull. At daybreak, the battleship arrives at the town to the shock of the German forces already on the ground. The Germans try to open fire while ordering their landing ships to head out to sea. It doesn't take long for the Yamato Takeru to unleash its main gun barrage, which obliterates the place.

== Release information ==
Konpeki no Kantai was released from 1994 to 2003 on LaserDisc and DVD, with the DVDs containing two episodes each. JC Staff eventually compiled it and Kyokujitsu no Kantai into three large DVD boxed sets. The first was released on July 29, 2005, by Tokuma Shoten and Happinet Pictures, only a few days before the 60th anniversary of the end of World War II. The second DVD box set was released on September 23, 2005. The last compilation was released on November 25, 2005. A Blu-ray release of the entire series is also in the works, with the first set scheduled for release on August 3, 2011. The second and third sets are scheduled to be released on November 25, 2011 and February 24, 2012.
