= Type 61 =

Type 61 may refer to:

- Type 61 frigate, a Royal Navy frigate class.
- Type 61 (tank), a Japan Ground Self-Defense Force tank
- Type 61 25 mm AAA gun
