= M47 Patton =

American main battle tank

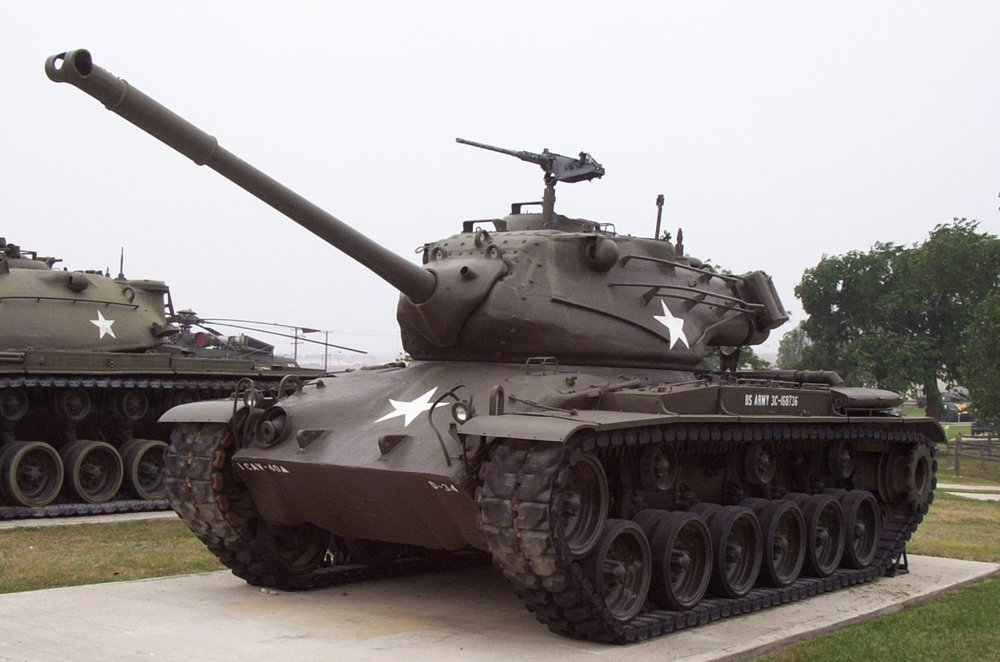
- M47 Patton on display at the 1st Cavalry Division Museum at Fort Hood, Killeen, Texas
- Type: Medium tank
- Place of origin: United States

Service history
- In service: 1951–1959 (US)
- Used by: See Operators below
- Wars: Korean War (test only); Suez Crisis; 1965 Indo-Pakistani War; Six-Day War; 1971 Indo-Pakistani War; Turkish invasion of Cyprus; Ethiopian Civil War; Ogaden War; Iran–Iraq War; Somaliland War of Independence; Somali Civil War; Yugoslav Wars

Production history
- Manufacturer: Detroit Arsenal Tank Plant; American Locomotive Company
- Developed from: M46 Patton
- Developed into: M48 Patton
- Produced: 1951–1954
- No. built: 8,576

Specifications
- Mass: 48.6 short tons (44.1 t) combat ready
- Length: 27 ft 11 in (8.51 m)
- Width: 11 ft 6.25 in (3.51 m)
- Height: 11 ft (3.35 m)
- Crew: Five; Commander; Gunner; Loader; Driver; Assistant driver
- Armor: Upper Glacis; 4 in (100 mm) at 60°; 8 in (200 mm) LoS; Turret Front; 4 in (100 mm) at 40°; 5.22 in (133 mm) LoS
- Main armament: 90 mm gun M36; 71 rounds
- Secondary armament: 1 × .50 cal (12.7 mm) M2 machine gun (roof-mounted); 2 x .30 cal (7.62 mm) M1919A4 machine gun; One flexible mount at right front of hull; One coaxial with the 90mm cannon
- Engine: Continental AV-1790-5B V12, air-cooled, gasoline engine 810 hp (600 kW)
- Power/weight: 17.6 hp (13.1 kW)/tonne
- Transmission: Allison CD-850-4; 2 forward ranges; 1 reverse
- Suspension: Torsion bar suspension
- Fuel capacity: 233 US gal (880 L; 194 imp gal)
- Operational range: 100 mi (160 km)
- Maximum speed: 30 mph (48 km/h)

The M47 Patton was an American medium tank, a development of the M46 Patton mounting an updated turret, and was in turn further developed as the M48 Patton. It was the second American tank to be named after General George S. Patton, commander of the U.S. Third Army during World War II and one of the earliest American advocates of tanks in battle.

The M47 was the U.S. Army's and Marine Corps' primary tank, intended to replace the M26 Pershing and M46 Patton medium tanks. (Note: although the Ordnance Committee Minutes/OCM #33476 ceased utilizing the heavy, medium, and light tank designations on 7 November 1950; going to the "...Gun Tank designation")) The M47 was widely used by U.S. Cold War allies, both SEATO and NATO countries, and was the only Patton series tank that never saw combat while in US service.

Although the later M48s and M60s were similar in appearance, those were completely new tank designs. Many different M47 Patton models remain in service internationally. The M47 was the last US tank to have a bow-mounted machine gun in the hull.

== Design ==
Although a new power plant corrected the mobility and reliability problems of the M26 Pershing, the subsequently renamed M46 was considered a stopgap solution that would be replaced later by the T42 medium tank. However, after fighting erupted in South Korea, the Army decided that it needed the new tank earlier than planned. It was deemed that there was not enough time to finish the development of the T42. The final decision was to produce another interim solution, with the turret of the T42 mounted on the existing M46 hull. Although this interim tank was itself technically immature, Army officials felt the improvements over the M46 in firepower and armor were worth the risk. The composite tank, developed by the Detroit Arsenal, was named the M47 Patton.

In December 1950 the Army awarded a $100 million contract to the American Locomotive Company for the production of 500 tanks. It entered production in 1951. Its main gun was the M36 (T119E1) 90 mm gun with an M12 optical rangefinder fitted, which was developed as a more powerful version of the earlier 90 mm guns and were backwards-compatible with their ammunition (but not vice versa, the new cartridge case does not chamber in the weaker guns). The secondary armament consisted of two .30 cal Browning machine guns, one in the bow and one coaxial with the 90mm main gun in the turret, and a .50 caliber Browning M2 on a pintle mount on the turret roof. The M47 was the last American-designed tank to include a bow machine gun. The T42 turret had a larger turret ring than the M26/M46 turret, and featured a needle-nose design, which improved armor protection of the turret front, an elongated turret bustle and storage bin which protruded halfway across the engine deck, and sloped sides to further improve ballistic protection; this gave the turret a decidedly lozenge-shaped profile. It also featured the M12 stereoscopic rangefinder, which was designed to improve first-round hit probability but proved difficult to use; the rangefinder protruded from both sides of the upper turret front, which would be a feature of American tanks until the advent of the M1 Abrams in 1980.

Production at American Locomotive began in July 1951. Logistical and technical issues plagued production almost from the start.

Truman administration policy sought to strengthen American arms makers' resilience to aerial attack by encouraging more decentralized weapons production – away from Detroit. The U.S. curtailed civilian automotive production to boost military production with the onset of the Korean War. As a result, Detroit's newly unemployed automotive workers found little work, while tank manufacturers outside Michigan lacked skilled workers. Truman's policy also counted on civilian factories being able to quickly transition to war-time production. However, many factories lacked needed tank production machinery, done away with during World War II demobilization.

A faulty Ordnance Corps-designed hydraulic turret-control mechanism, shared by the M41 Walker Bulldog, kept the tanks from Korea while engineers worked on a fix. Engineers improved production quality controls of the hydraulics by April 1952, and set about correcting M47s sidelined in storage. By then Army officials had scrapped plans to send the tanks to Korea, in favor of providing them to troops stationed in Europe and at home.

The first M47s were not fielded to the 1st and 2nd Armored Divisions until summer 1952. Standardized in May 1952, the M47 Patton's production ran until November 1953; Detroit built 5,481 tanks, and American Locomotive Company (Alco) produced 3,095, for a total production run of 8,576 M47 Pattons.

== Deployment ==
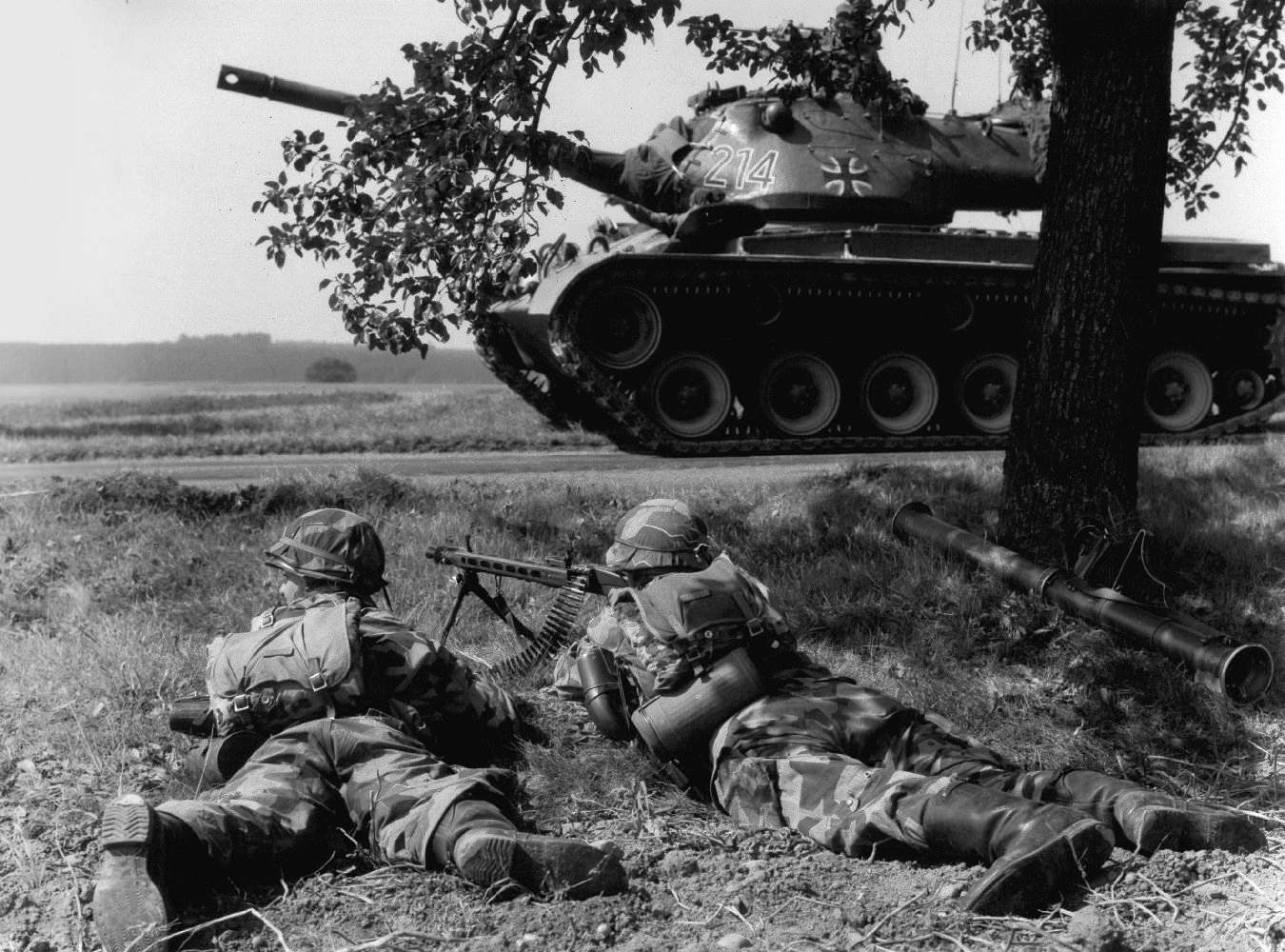
West German M47 in 1960.

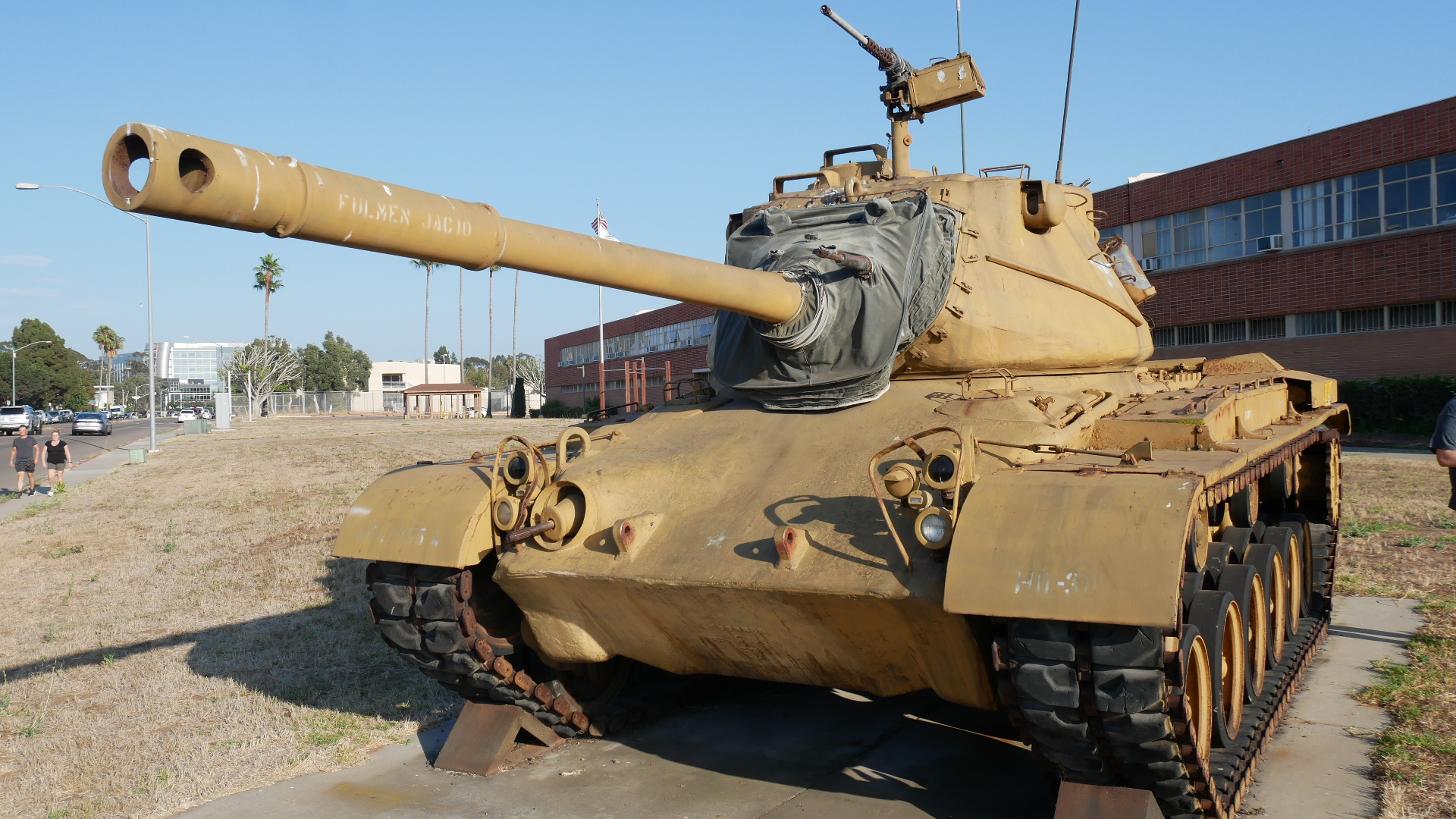
M47 Patton outside of the California National Guard Armory in San Diego, California.

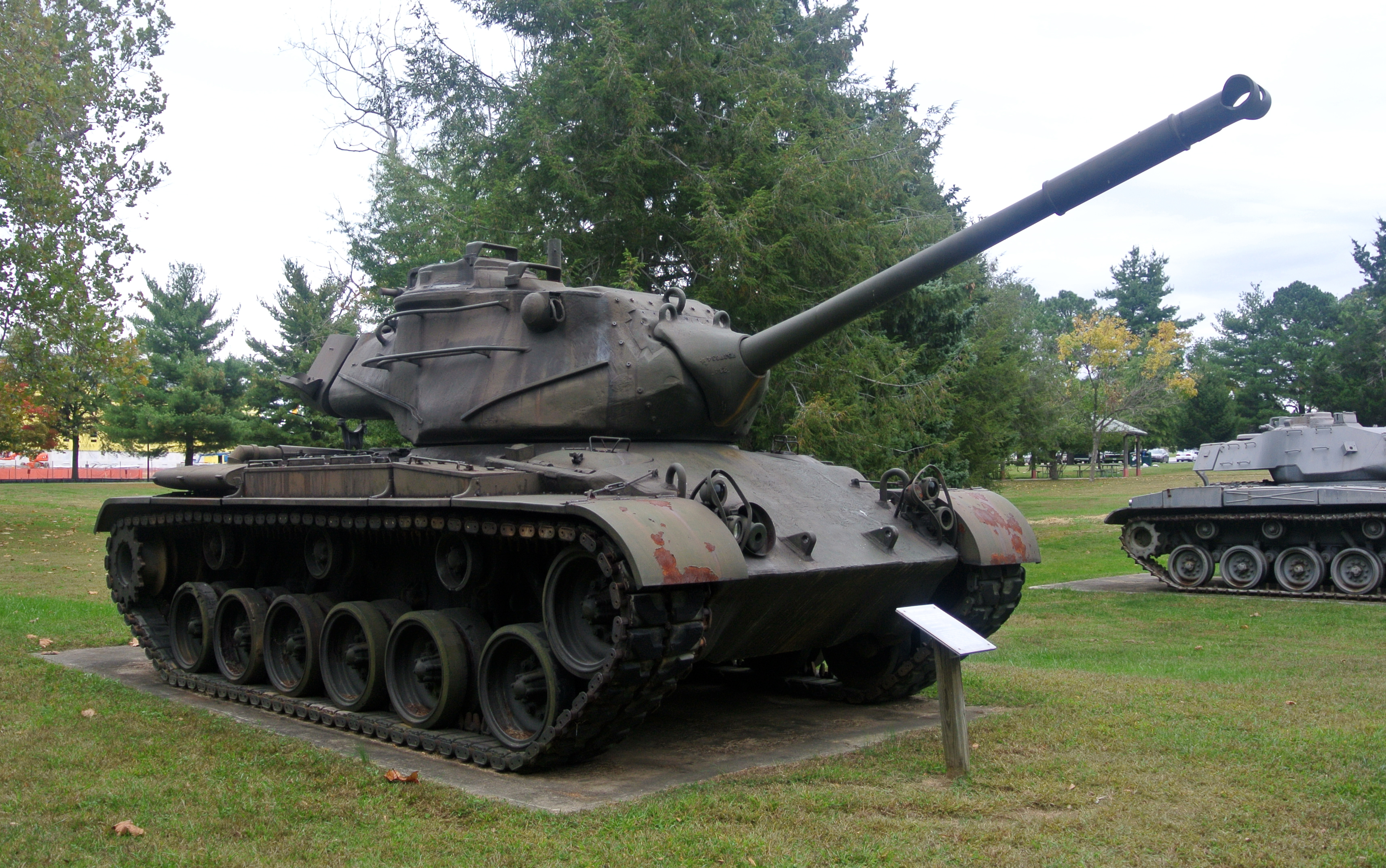
M47 Patton tank at Fort Meade, Maryland.

After the U.S. Army in Germany was equipped with the M47, the first M47s delivered under the Mutual Security Agency program were delivered to Portugal in 1952. In October the agency announced that NATO member nations had agreed to adopt the British Centurion main battle tank and the M47 as standard. By October the at Camp Drum in July, the New Jersey Army National Guard was the first reserve force to train with the tank.

The Marine Corps also fielded M47s starting in late 1952; after the Korean War, all seven Marine tank battalions, three divisional, two reserve training, and two force level, each fielded M47s. But these were soon replaced with M48A1 Pattons and M103 heavy tanks, with the last M47s being retired in 1959.

American Locomotive production was halted in October when the company's ordnance and locomotive divisions went on strike. Production resumed in February when union leaders agreed to a pay raise. In December 1952 the Defense Department ordered cutbacks to M47 and M48 tank production. In November 1953 American Locomotive halted production of the M47 after operators found drive gear defects in Europe. Army officials quickly acknowledged the issue arose from their own expedient decision to use lower grades of steel to circumvent wartime shortages. Chrysler laid off about 1000 workers at Detroit Tank Arsenal when it wrapped up production in November. American Locomotive resumed production in November. The company closed its tank division in June 1954.

With the arrival of the improved M48 Patton in 1953, the M47 was declared "limited standard" in 1955, and examples in tank units were replaced with the M48 series before long. After being declared obsolete in 1957, M46s and M47s were retained in active duty infantry division battlegroup assault gun platoons (four tanks each, one platoon per battlegroup, for a total of 20 tanks per division) until replaced with the light truck-mounted SS-10 anti-tank guided missile in the early 1960s. M47s were used by the Reserves for a relatively short time, soon being replaced by early production M48 Patton series tanks; thus, most of the M47s were exported in the late 1950s.

Out of the 8,576 M47s built, 8,552 (99.7 percent) were transferred to other countries through the Major Defense Acquisition Program (MDAP) during the 1950s, forming the backbone of the NATO tank force for nearly 15 years.

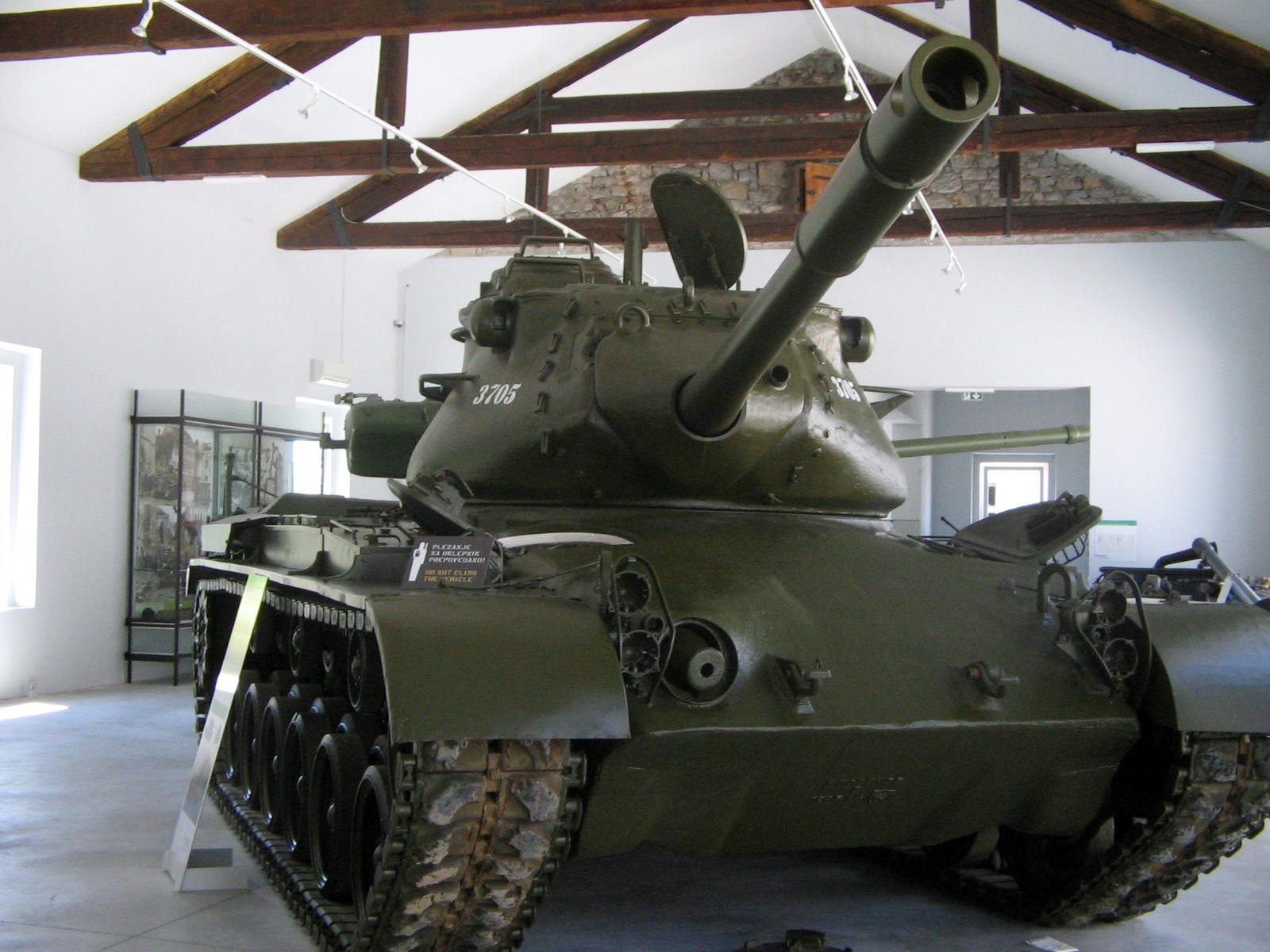
Yugoslavia M47 Patton - Pivka

The M47 was widely used by many countries, especially NATO and SEATO allies, including Austria (147), Belgium (784), Ethiopia (30), France (856), Greece (396), Portugal (161), from USA and West Germany), Iran (around 400), Italy (2,480), Japan (1 for evaluation only), Jordan (49), Pakistan (100), Portugal (161), Saudi Arabia (23 from the US, 108 on the international market), Somalia (25 from Saudi Arabia), South Korea (531), Sudan (17 from Saudi Arabia), Spain (389), Switzerland (2 for evaluation), Turkey (1,347 from the US and West Germany), West Germany (1,120), and Yugoslavia (319). Like the US Army of the time, the West German Bundeswehr also used the M47 in a tank destroyer role until replacing them with the Kanonenjagdpanzer in 1966.

U.S. Army M47s remaining in storage were expended as targets.

== Combat service ==
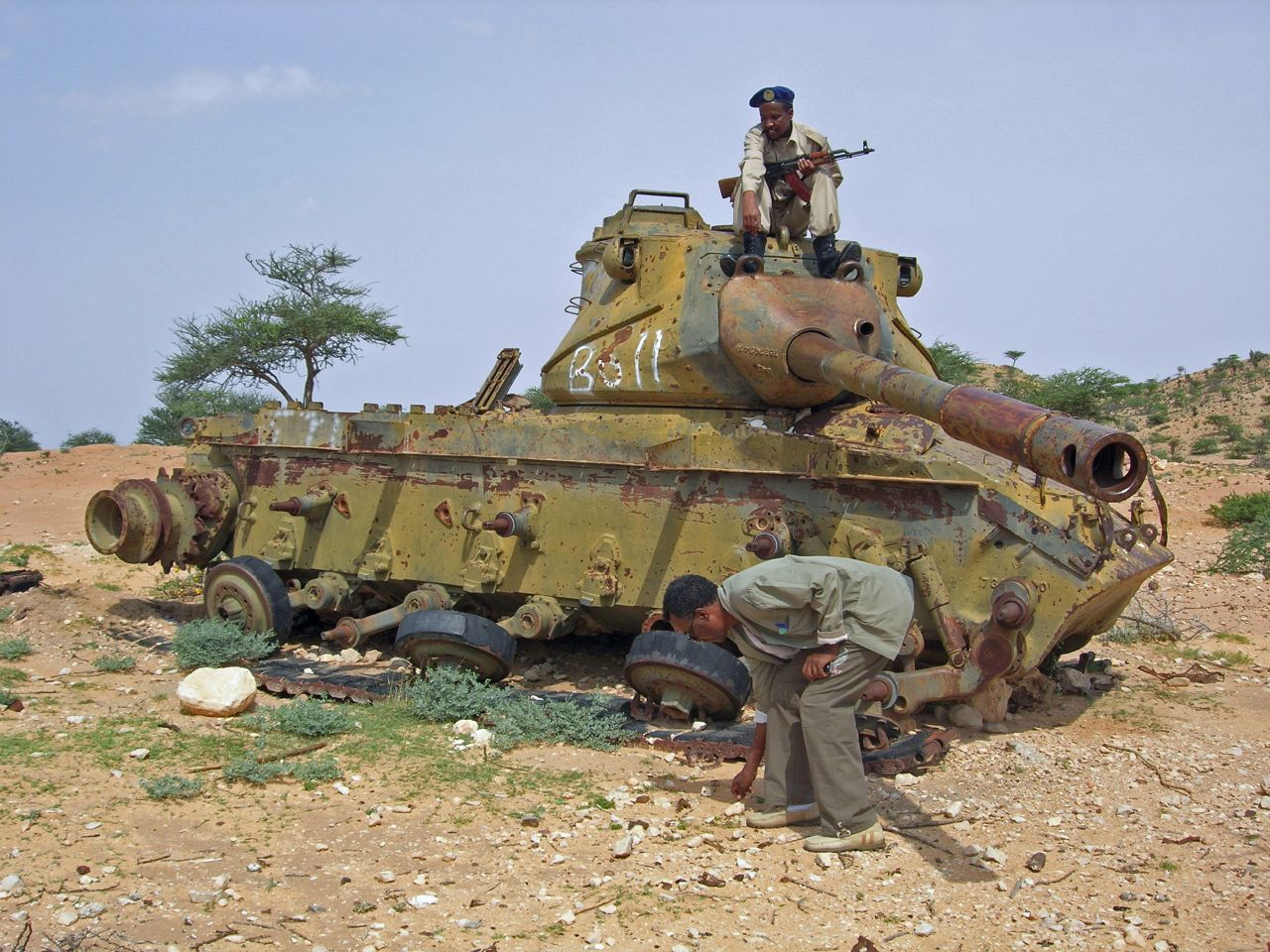
A destroyed M47 Patton in Somaliland, left behind wrecked from the Somaliland War of Independence

- Near the end of the Korean war, some M47s were deployed for field testing. Some of these had 18-inch searchlights.
- France deployed a squadron of its M47s against Egypt during the Suez Crisis in 1956.
- Pakistan fielded M47s against India in both the Indo-Pakistani War of 1965 and Indo-Pakistani War of 1971.
- Jordan used M47s against Israel in the Six-Day War in 1967. The Israelis regarded the Jordanians as the best enemy tankers during the conflict. Jordan lost a total of 131 M47 and M48 tanks.
- The M47 was used by the Turkish Army in the Turkish invasion of Cyprus between July and August 1974, with an estimated 200 Patton tanks involved in the combat action. At least one operational M47, Serial Number 092273, was captured by the Cyprus National Guard and remained in their service until 1993. This example is currently stored at the camp of the 25 ΕΜΑ in Paphos for use as a training and a war-memorial exhibit.
- During Ogaden War the Somalis used T-54 and T-55 tanks to defeat Ethiopian M41 and M47 tanks.
- Iran sent their M47s to fight against Iraq in the Iran–Iraq War between 1980 and 1988. Iranian M47s were roughly equivalent to the T-54s but not as good as the T-55s, performed very poorly against much-superior Iraqi tanks such as the T-62s and T-72s. Large numbers of M47 Patton tanks fell into Iraqi capture by the end of the war.
- The M47 saw small scale use during the Somali Civil War.
- In the 1980s and up to the early 1990s, the Turkish Army used M47 tanks against PKK guerrillas within Turkey and neighbouring Iraq. Turkish M48A5 variants replaced all remaining M47s by the late 1990s.
- Croatia used M47s against their Serbian enemies in the Croatian War of Independence but their performance was regarded as inferior to that of the Soviet-designed T-55. The M47s were retired from service immediately after the war and are now used as gunnery/missile live-firing targets during military exercises.

== Variants ==
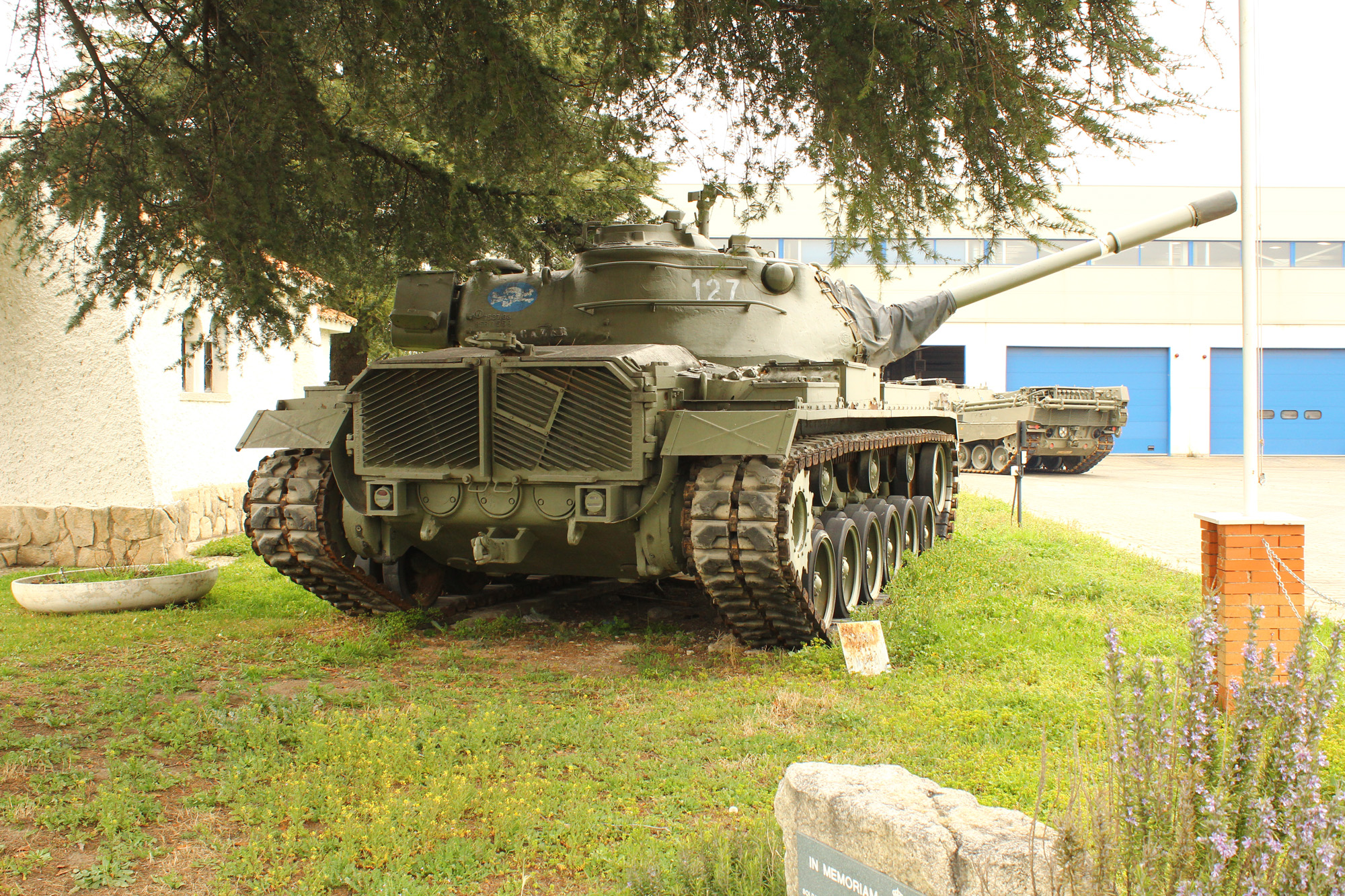
Spanish M47E1. Note the engine deck similar to those on M60A1

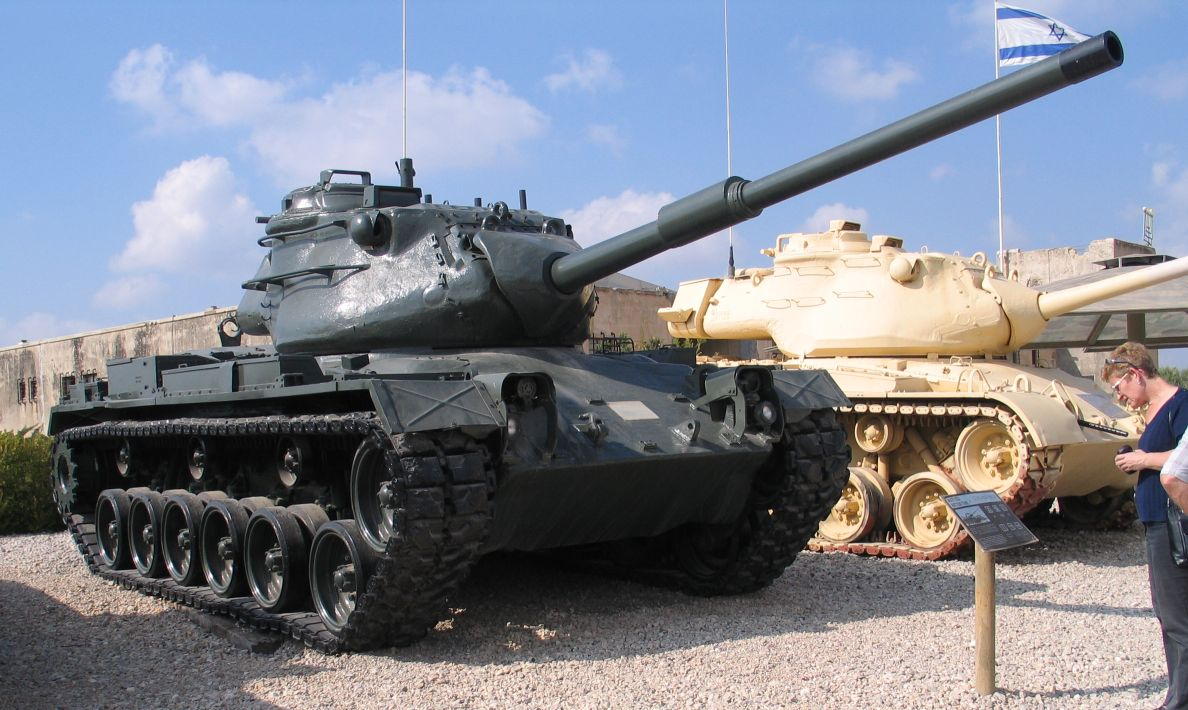
M47E2 at Yad La-Shiryon

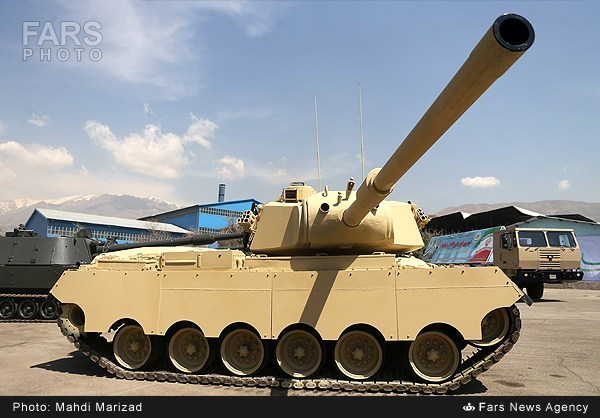
Sabalan

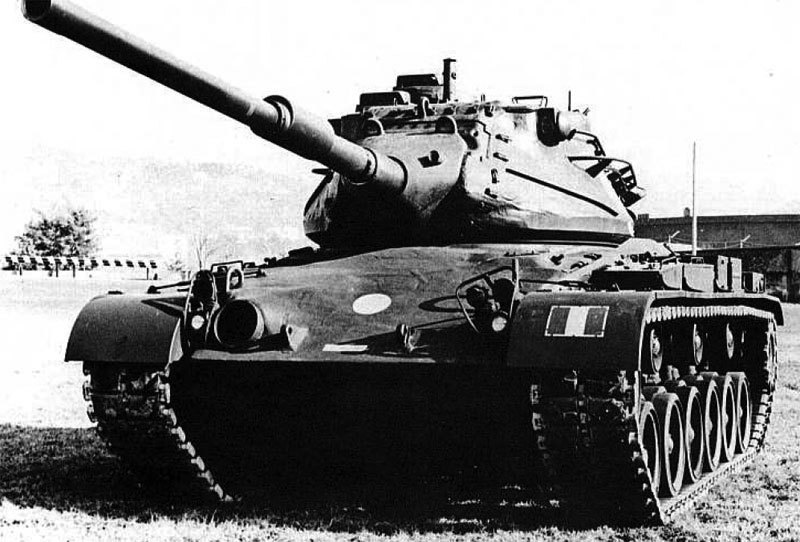
Italian M47 with 105 mm gun

	M47	M47M
Crew	5	4
Length (gun forward)	335.0 in (8.5 m)	338.8 in (8.6 m)
Width	138.25 in (3.5 m)	133.5 in (3.4 m)
Height (over MG)	132.0 in (3.4 m)	133.8 in (3.4 m)
Ground clearance	18.5 in (47.0 cm)	
Top speed	30 mph (48 km/h)	35 mph (56 km/h)
Fording	48 in (1.2 m)	
Max. grade	60%	
Max. trench	8.5 ft (2.6 m)	
Max. wall	36 in (0.9 m)	
Range	80 mi (130 km)	370 mi (600 km)
Power	810 hp (600 kW) at 2800 rpm	750 hp (560 kW) at 2400 rpm
Power-to-weight ratio	16.7 hp/ST (13.7 kW/t)	14.5 hp/ST (11.9 kW/t)
Torque	1,610 lb⋅ft (2,180 N⋅m) at 2200 rpm	1,710 lb⋅ft (2,320 N⋅m) at 1800 rpm
Weight, combat loaded	101,775 lb (46,160 kg)	103,200 lb (46,810 kg)
Ground pressure	13.3 psi (92 kPa)	14.5 psi (100 kPa)
Main armament	90 mm M36	
Elevation, main gun	+19° −10°	
Traverse rate	15 seconds/360°	
Elevation rate	4°/second	
Main gun ammo	71 rounds	79 rounds
Firing rate	8 rounds/minute	

- M46E1 – pilot model, M46 hull with T42 turret, fitted with the M36 90 mm Gun, and was longer to incorporate a radio, ventilator, and featured a stereoscopic rangefinder; only one built
- M47 – main production version, M46 hull modified with redesigned glacis, reduction from five to three track return rollers per side, longer mufflers on rear fenders; 8,576 built
- M47E1 (U.S.) – American designation for M47 tanks modified to use the fire control system of the British Centurion main battle tank, complete with its gun stabilizer system. It was rated highly by crews in comparative evaluation with other American vehicles of the period, but was not adopted due to the M47 reaching the end of its production life; up to 20 built
- M47M – The product of an improvement program started in the late 1960s, the M47M featured the engine and fire control elements from the M60A1. The assistant driver's position was eliminated in favor of additional 90 mm ammunition. Not used by the US; over 800 vehicles were produced for Iran and Pakistan All tanks were upgraded in a plant set up in Masjed Soleyman with US aid in the 1960s; following the Iranian revolution, plans of upgrading Jordanian M47 and M48 tanks were cancelled.
- M47E – Spanish M47M austere version (kept original FCS).
- M47E1 (Spain) – Second Spanish upgrade batch with rearranged main gun ammunition storage and crew heater. Both new and upgraded M47Es. 330 converted.
- M47E2 – 45 built. M47E1 with Rh-105 105 mm gun and improved FCS (still electromechanical). Passive night vision for driver and commander. All M47 series MBT in Spanish service retired 1993.
- M47ER3 – Spanish armored recovery vehicle. 22 built.
- Sabalan – Iranian upgraded version of the US M47M, It has side skirts and a newly built turret fitted with a 105 mm gun, laser range finder, new fire control system and communication equipment. Never used in active service.
- Tiam – Iranian variant of the Sabalan fitted with Type 59 tank turret, new fire control system, new communication equipment, composite and reactive armor.

Additional equipment

- M6 – Earth Moving Tank Mounting Bulldozer. Bulldozer kit for the M47 series.
- Unknown name - Switching 90mm M36 to 90mm M41 which used by M48 Patton III.
- M47 with 105 mm (France) – French upgrade with 105 mm CN 105 F1 gun, extra ammunition storage by removing assistant driver position, and infrared spotlight.
- M47 with 105 mm (Italy) – Italian upgrade with OTO Melara 105 mm L/52 gun, new fire control systems, and new AVDS-1790-2A diesel engine.

== Operators ==
=== Current ===
- Iran − In 1994, it was estimated that Iran had 100 M47 tanks (upgraded to the M47M standard) out of 400 originally delivered 148 M47 and M48 as of 2024.

=== Former ===
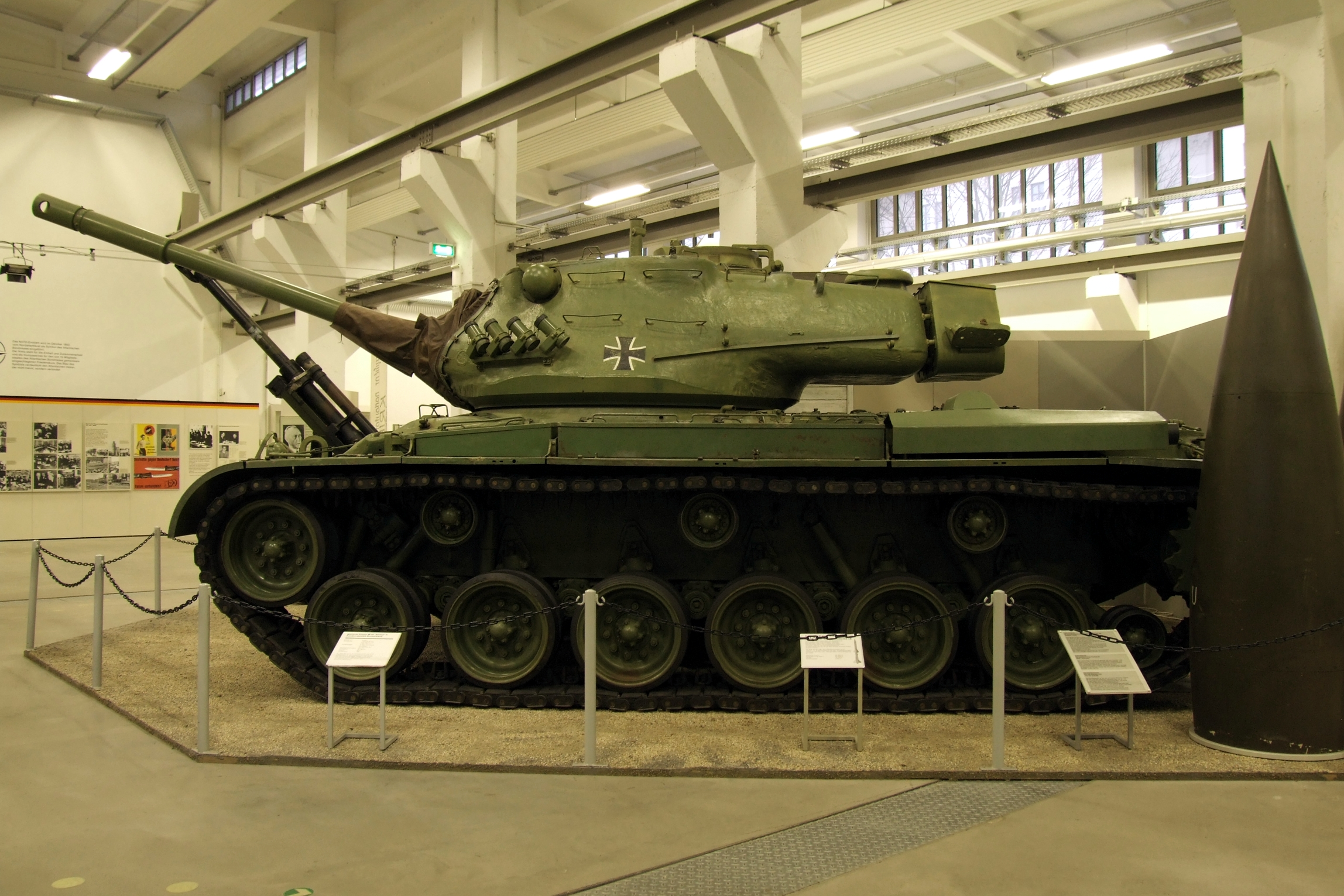
M47 Patton II in museum in Dresden, Germany.

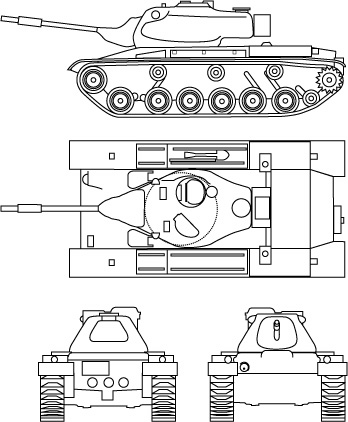
Line drawing of the M47.

- Austria
- Belgium
- Bosnia and Herzegovina
- Croatia – Around 20 were used during the Croatian War of Independence.
- Ethiopia – Approximately 30 acquired second-hand from Yugoslavia in 1977, without the US permission.
- France – 856 (1954–1970) One of the tanks was converted with the 105mm gun developed for the AMX-30, including modifications to the gun breech assembly and ammunition racks.
- West Germany
- Greece – 350 in 1994.
- Iraq – Prior to the Gulf War, Iraq had a handful of M47s captured from Iran.
- Italy – 300 were in reserve in 1994.
- Jordan – Acquired about 50 from the United States in the mid-1960s, as well as 60 captured Iranian M47s and M48s from Iraq in 1988.
- Pakistan – 150 in 1994, rebuilt to the M47M standard.
- Portugal
- Saudi Arabia
- Serbia and Montenegro − 60 in 1994, inherited from ex-Yugoslav stocks.
- Somalia – 100, no longer operational by 1994.
- South Korea – A total of 531 units—first received in 1959, with the vast majority transferred from ex-USFK inventory between 1963 and 1964—were operated by both the Army and the Marine Corps. A few were converted into ARVs, which were subsequently replaced by M88A1s between 1980 and 1983. During their service life, a substantial number of units had their main guns replaced with 90 mm M41 and M41A1 (M41E1) guns salvaged from M48 tanks that were being upgraded with 105 mm cannons. Although all units were retired from active service in 2006, they continued to serve as coastal artillery until 2017.
- Spain – 375 in 1994, scrapped.
- Taiwan
- Turkey – 767 were in reserve in 1994.
- United States − Phased out by the late 1950s.
- Yugoslavia

=== Non-state ===
- Republika Srpska
- Serbian Krajina

=== Evaluation only ===
- Japan – One M47 was provided for evaluation, and used as reference for the STA (Type 61 tank prototype) development. After being used for comparison with prototype vehicles of STA and technical analysis, it was disposed of. This tank was not scrapped, and is kept in a private collection (not open to the public as of 2021).

=== Civilian ===
- United States – 1 former Austrian Army M47 owned by Arnold Schwarzenegger. He previously operated the vehicle (331) during his mandatory service in 1965, which he later obtained in 1992 and now uses to support his charity.

== See also ==
- Centurion – British Tank
- T-54 – Soviet tank
- Type 61 – Japanese tank
- Panzer 58 – Swiss tank
- M26 Pershing
- M46 Patton
- M48 Patton
- M60 Patton
- List of armoured fighting vehicles
- M103 (heavy tank)
- G-numbers SNL G262
