= Type 74 tank =

Type 74
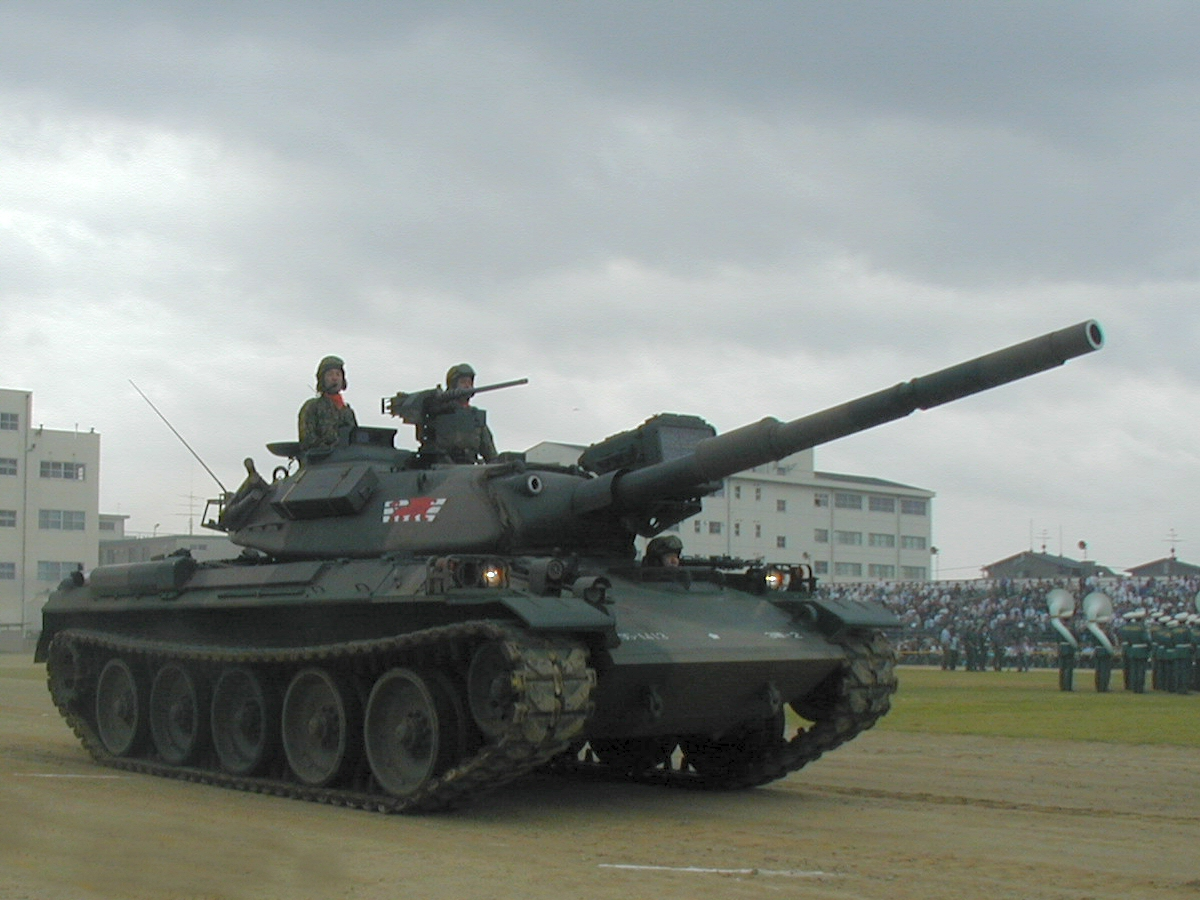
- Type 74 on the open day of a JGSDF base in Itami City, October 2005
- Type: Main battle tank
- Place of origin: Japan

Service history
- In service: 1975–2024

Production history
- Designer: Mitsubishi Heavy Industries
- Designed: 1962
- Manufacturer: Mitsubishi Heavy Industries
- Unit cost: 350-400 Million Yen (~3.2 - 3.6 Million USD)
- Produced: 1975–1988
- No. built: 873

Specifications
- Mass: 38 tonnes (42 short tons; 37 long tons)
- Length: 9.41 m (30 ft 10 in)
- Width: 3.18 m (10 ft 5 in)
- Height: 2.25 m (7 ft 5 in)
- Crew: 4
- Armor: 189–195 mm (7.4–7.7 in)
- Main armament: JSW Royal Ordnance L7A1 105mm L/51 rifled gun 55 rounds
- Secondary armament: M2HB 12.7 mm machine gun 660 rounds Type 74 7.62 mm machine gun 4,500 rounds
- Engine: Mitsubishi 10ZF Model 21, 10 cylinders diesel, 21.5 L 750 hp (560 kW)
- Power/weight: 19 hp/tonne
- Suspension: hydropneumatic
- Operational range: 300 km (190 mi)
- Maximum speed: 53 km/h (33 mph)

The Type 74 (74式戦車, nana-yon-shiki-sensha) was a main battle tank (MBT) of the Japan Ground Self-Defense Force (JGSDF). It was built by Mitsubishi Heavy Industries as a supplement to the earlier Type 61. It was based on the best features of a number of contemporary designs, placing it in the same class as the US M60 Patton or German Leopard 1. Like these designs, it mounted the L7 rifled 105 mm gun. The design did not enter widespread use until 1980, by which point other Western forces had introduced more capable designs.

It was followed by the heavier Type 90, and the Type 74 was withdrawn from service in 2024.

== History ==
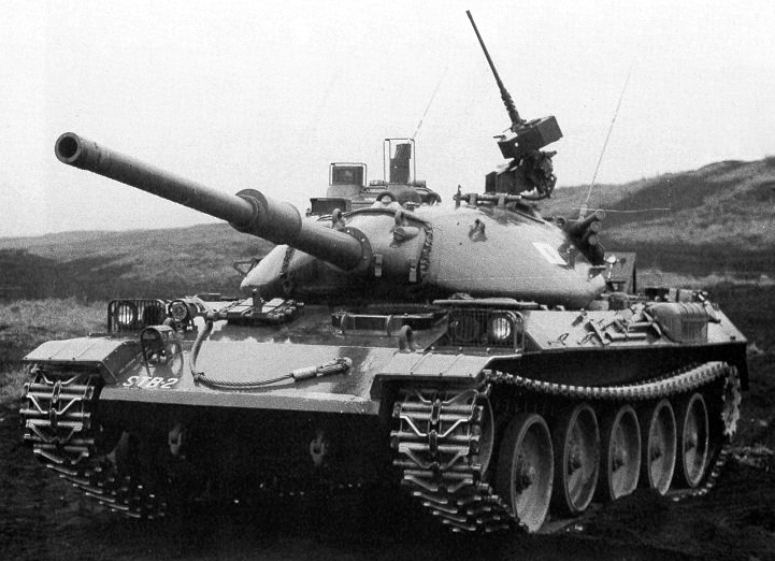
STB-2 tank

The JGSDF began studies on new tank designs with Mitsubishi in 1962, after the Type 61 had been shown to be outmatched by new Soviet tanks such as the T-62. Features from several designs were incorporated, including the controllable suspension of the US-German MBT-70 project, the hull of the Leopard 1, and a similar 105mm gun. The design included a rotating cupola for the commander, and a new autoloader for the main gun. Prior to the 1965 decision to design an entirely new tank, some technologies which would later be used in the STB-1 (first prototype) were already in development independently in Japan. The design was finalized in 1964 and various test rigs were built between 1964 and 1967.

The Type 74 was finalized for service in 1974.

== Design ==
=== Armament ===
The first tanks had been designed to bear the 90mm M3 cannon, present in the Type 61, and STA-1, revealing itself underpowered. Later in the development stage engineers opted to license the NATO standard L7 105mm cannon. Japan only produced the barrel under license, developing an indigenous gun mantlet, breech and recoil system. The full length of the cannon was 5.89 m (19 ft 4 in), for a total weight of 1,282 kg (2,862 lb) Royal Ordnance L7. Initially, the main gun only used APDS (Armour-Piercing Discarding Sabot) and HEP (High Explosive Plastic) as its primary ammunition. Later it was modified to fire APFSDS (Armour-Piercing Fin-Stabilized Discarding Sabot) and HEAT-MP (High-Explosive Anti-Tank Multi-Purpose) shells as well.

The secondary armament consisted of a 12.7mm anti-aircraft machine gun (with 660 rounds) and a 7.62 coaxial machine gun (4500 rounds).

In service, the tanks were updated with the addition of infra-red imagers rather than image intensifiers for the commander and gunner, and a laser rangefinder in the commander's cupola. The gunner's position included a digital fire control computer, fed range data from the commander's range finder. Rounds for the main gun were upgraded from HEP to APFSDS and HEAT-MP.

=== Mobility ===
The Type 74 tank is powered by the Mitsubishi 10ZF Model 21 10-cylinder two-stroke cycle diesel engine providing 750 hp (560 kW). At 19 hp/tonne, its power-to-weight ratio is similar to the French AMX-30. The maximum quoted road speed of the Type 74 is 53 km/h; however, speeds of at least 60 km/h have been achieved.

=== Armor ===
Instead of composite armour (as used on the later Type 90 main battle tank), the Type 74 adopted welded steel plates for hull construction, with sloped armour extensively used to defeat armour-piercing shells and other kinetic energy penetrators. It has frontal hull armor of 80 mm with an effective armor thickness of up to 189 mm for the upper glacis and 139 mm for lower glacis. Side armor is 35 mm, while rear armor is 25 mm thick. The cast steel turret has an estimated 195 mm of armor. When compared to other second-generation MBTs, the Type 74 has more armour than a Leopard 1 (122mm and 140mm), but less than comparable Soviet vehicles such as the T-62 (174mm and 204mm).

== Service ==
The first prototype, designated STB-1, was delivered in late 1968 and underwent a number of modifications until 1969. The autoloader proved too complex and expensive, and was removed, as was the remote-controlled anti-aircraft machine gun. The overall design of the turret was also changed, becoming longer. These changes resulted in the STB-3, which was delivered in 1971. The final prototype, designated STB-6, was delivered in 1973. Production finally started as the Type 74 in September 1975, with 225 being delivered by January 1980. Production ended in 1989, with total production running to 893 examples.

The Type 74 was considered outdated even before it entered service. The Type 90 was to have replaced it outright, but with the end of the Cold War, these plans were scaled back. In 1993, four Type 74s were improved to the new Type 74 Kai (改) [Type 74 mod G (G型)] standard, adding a passive infrared camera and side skirts. The upgrade proved to be extremely expensive, and the program was abandoned.

Starting in April 2019, the Ministry of Defense enacted the Medium-Term Development Defense Plan (31中期防), which involved the retirement of Type 74 main battle tanks in service, to be replaced by the newer Type 16 Maneuver Combat Vehicle.

At the same time, official tank units based on the main land of Honshu, Kyushu, and Shikoku would be disbanded and replaced by new mobility-based combat units, in the form of a Rapid Deployment Regiment or Reconnaissance Combat Battalion, with the Infantry-based Divisions and Brigades to feature one of either. For each of the new units, they are to be equipped with a unit of Type 16 MCVs (1-2 Companies).

Despite the plan being official as of 2019, the first tank units were disbanded throughout 2018, including the 4th Tank Battalion (4th Division), 8th Tank Battalion (8th Division), and 14th Tank Troop (14th Brigade). After the plan's enactment, 6th Tank Battalion of the 6th Division North Eastern Army was disbanded, and changes were made to existing tank formations, including at JGSDF Fuji School, to phase out numbers of Type 74 tanks in service. As of March 17, 2022, the disbandment of the 1st Division's 1st Tank Battalion of the Eastern Army has been the most recent change to the armored formation of the JGSDF.

Type 74 was scheduled to be retired by March 2024. As all remaining Type 74 units (9th Tank Battalion, 10th Tank Battalion and 13th Tank Troop) were disbanded in March 2024, all Type 74s were retired from JGSDF. The Ministry of Defense plans to store about 30 Type 74s in mothballing. JGSDF personnel assigned to work the Type 74 are reassigned to the Type 16.

== Variants ==
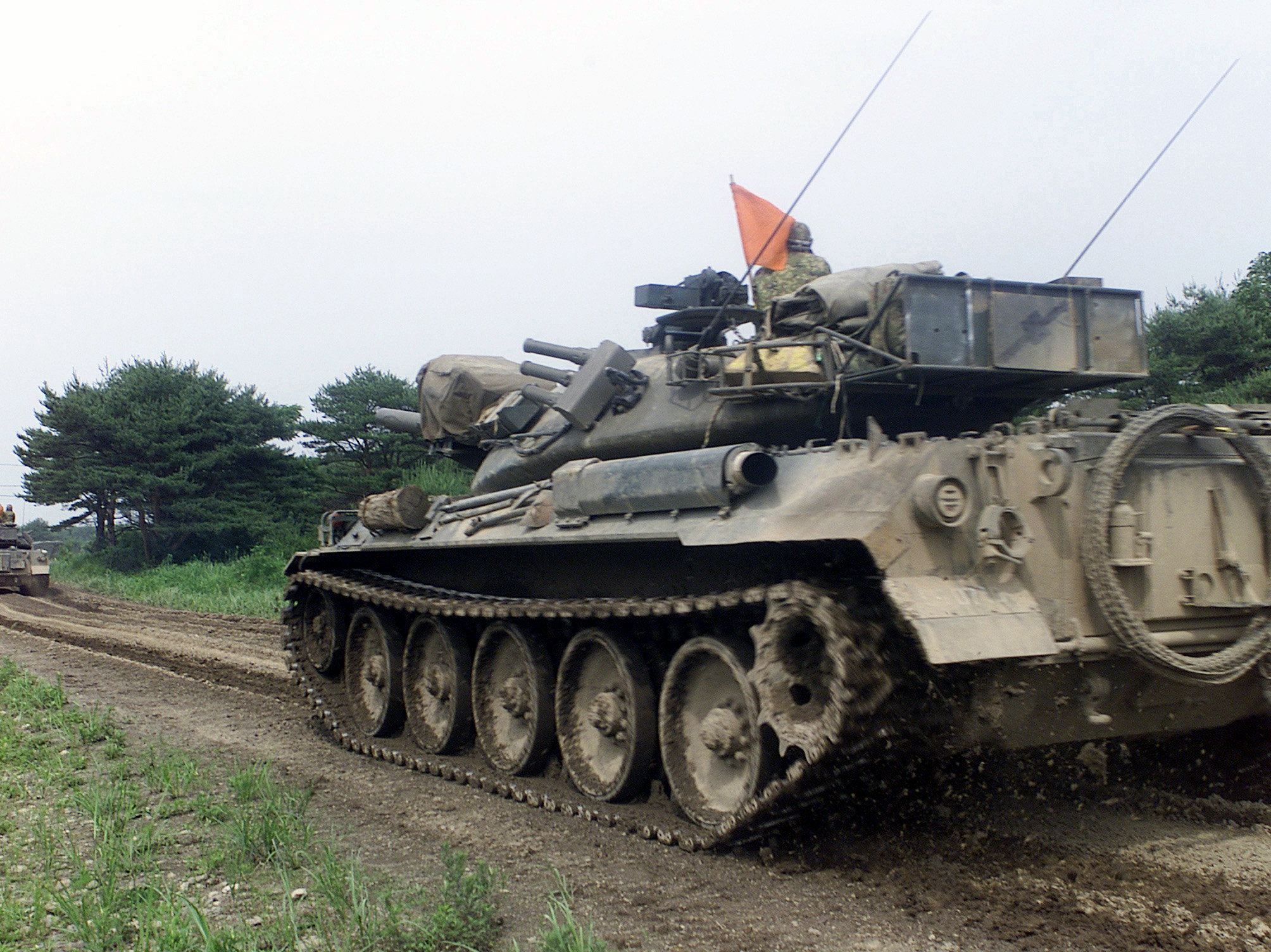
Rear view.

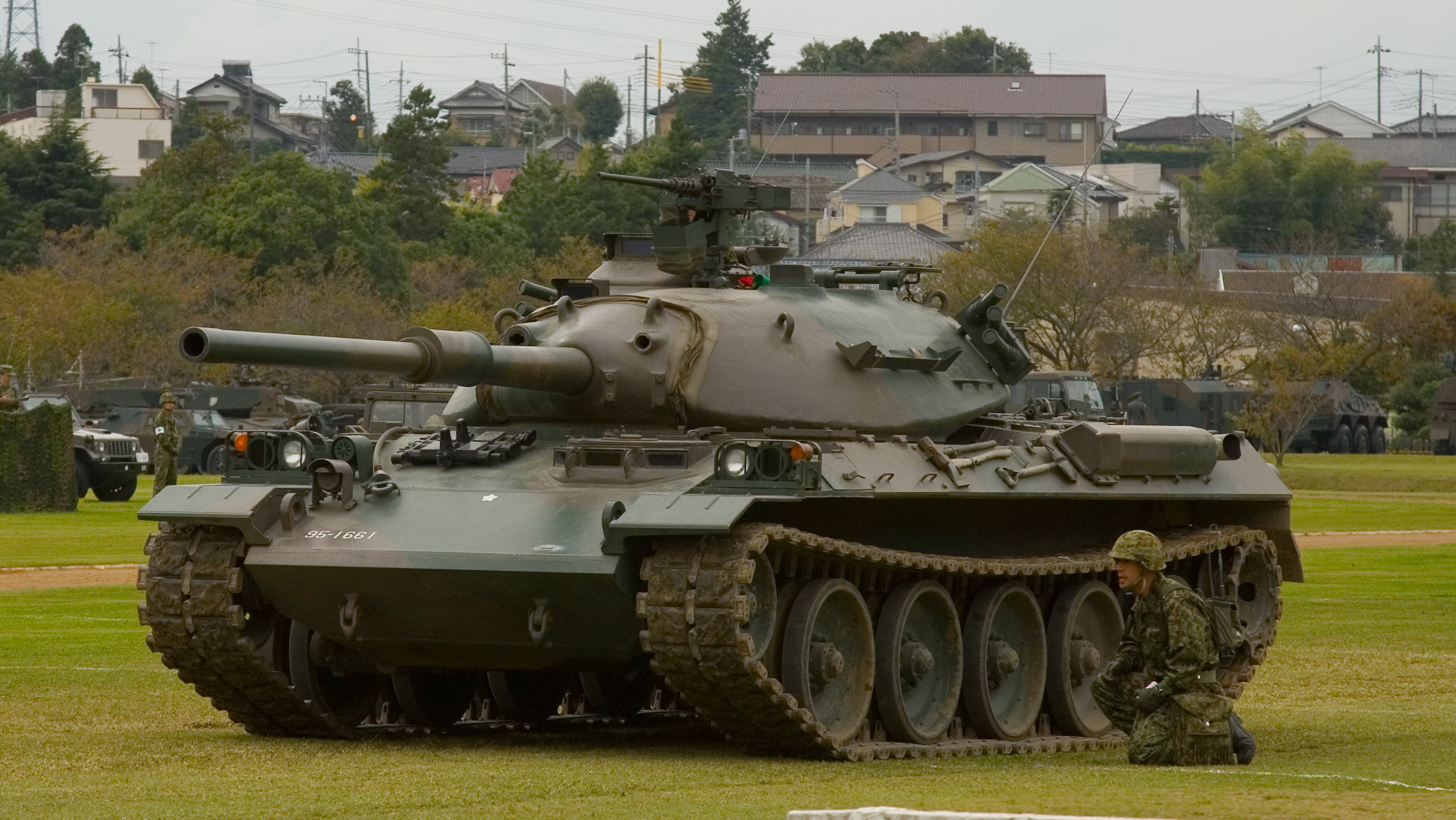
Front view.

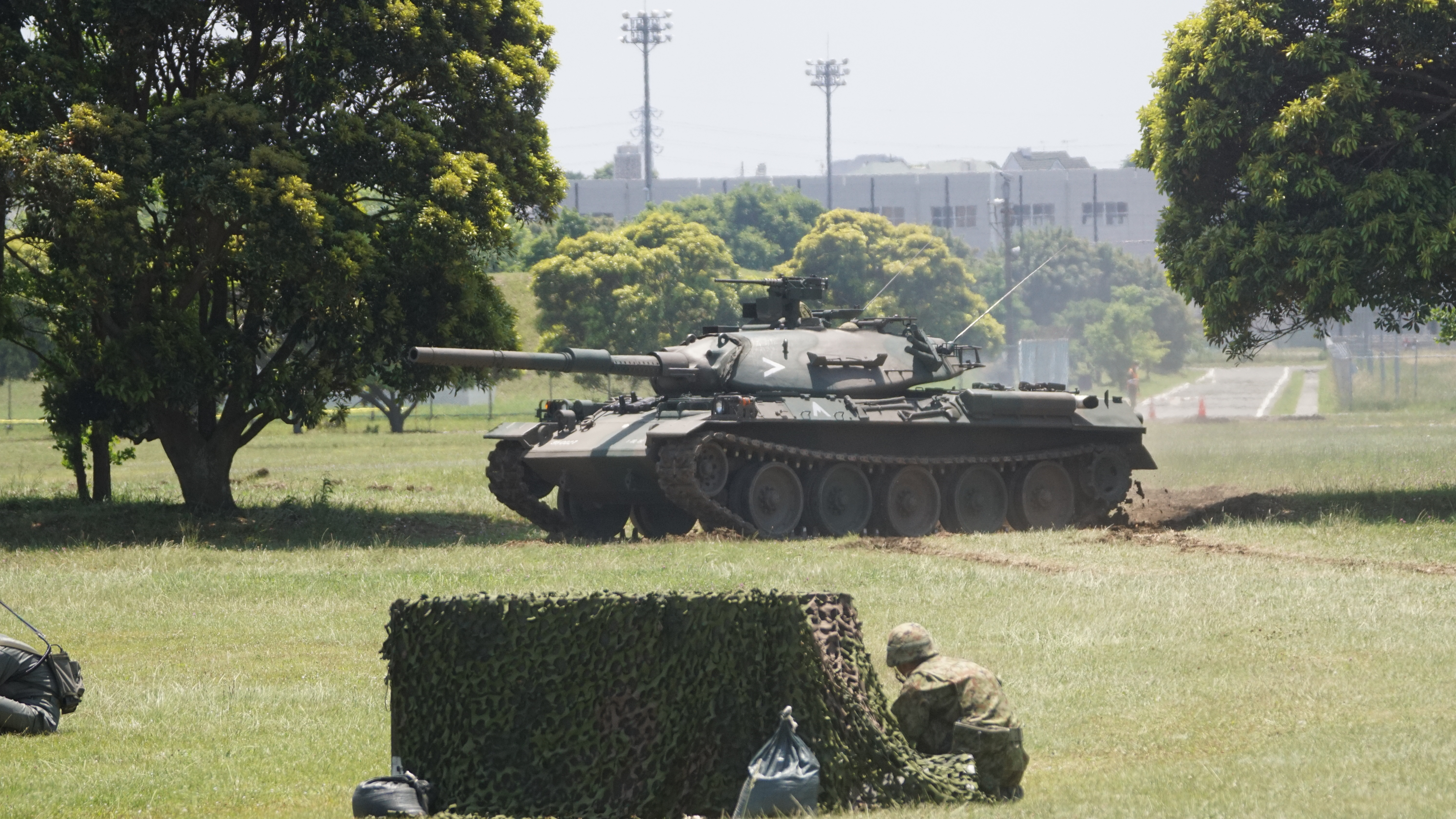
Type 74 tank in Yokosuka 2017

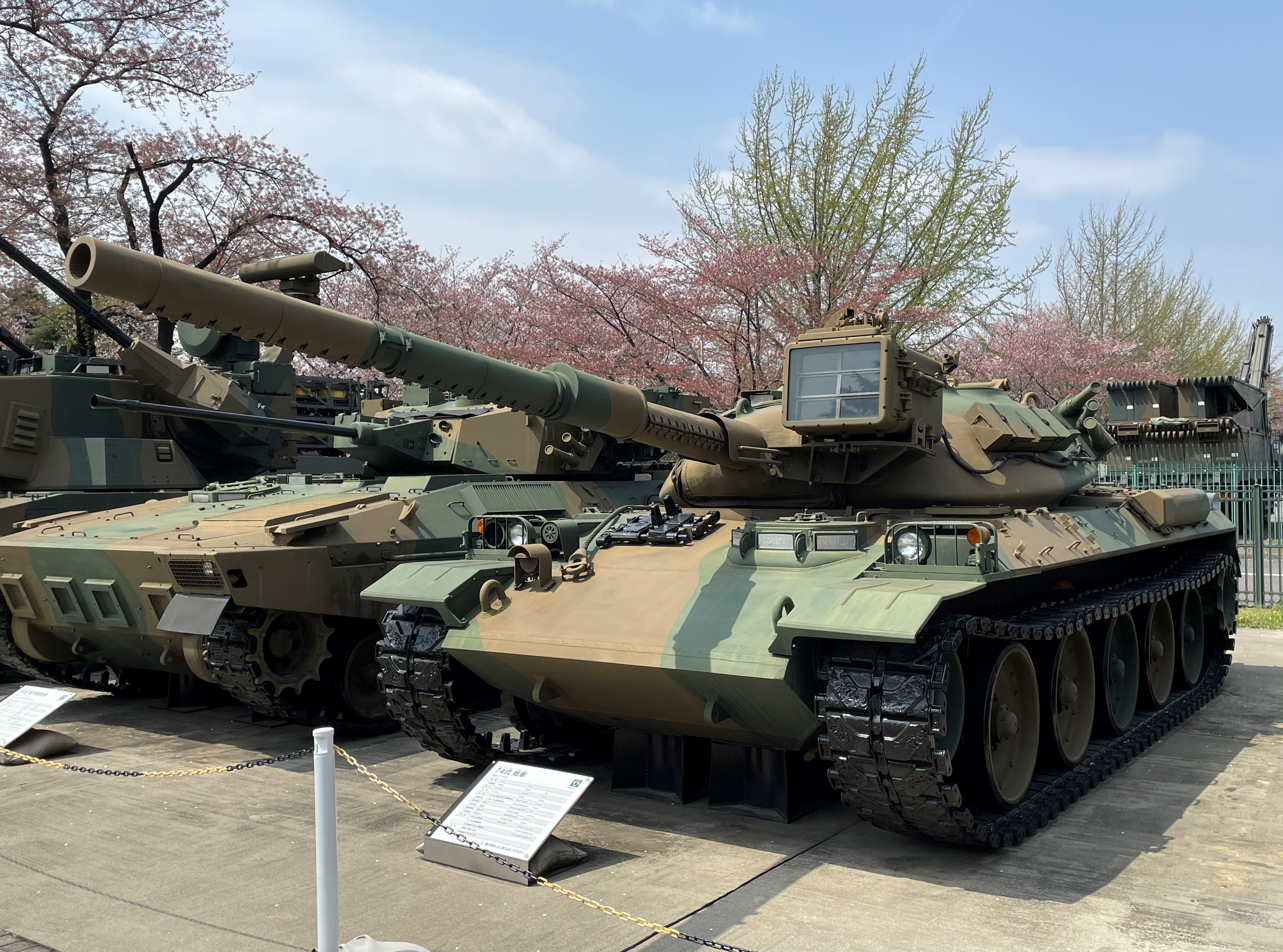
A Type 74 tank in 2022, preserved at the JGSDF Public Information Center

- Type 74 first mod (74式戦車 初期生産型)
- Type 74 mod B (74式戦車 B型)
- Type 74 mod C (74式戦車 C型)
- Type 74 mod D (74式戦車 D型)
- Type 74 mod E (74式戦車 E型)
- Type 74 mod F (74式戦車 F型)
- Type 74 mod G/Kai (74式戦車 G型/改)
- Type 87 self-propelled anti-aircraft gun (87式自走高射機関砲)
- Type 78 armoured recovery vehicle (78式戦車回収車)
- Type 91 armoured vehicle-launched bridge (91式戦車橋)

== Operators ==
- Japan – 893 produced between September 1975 and 1989, with 225 delivered by January 1980. 822 in service in 1990, 870 in service in 1995 and 2000, 700 in service in 2006. As of March 17, 2022, from the disbandment of the 1st Division's 1st Tank Battalion of the Eastern Army, approximately 130 Type 74 tanks remained in service. All Type 74 tanks were retired in March 2024.
