= Type 61 (tank) =

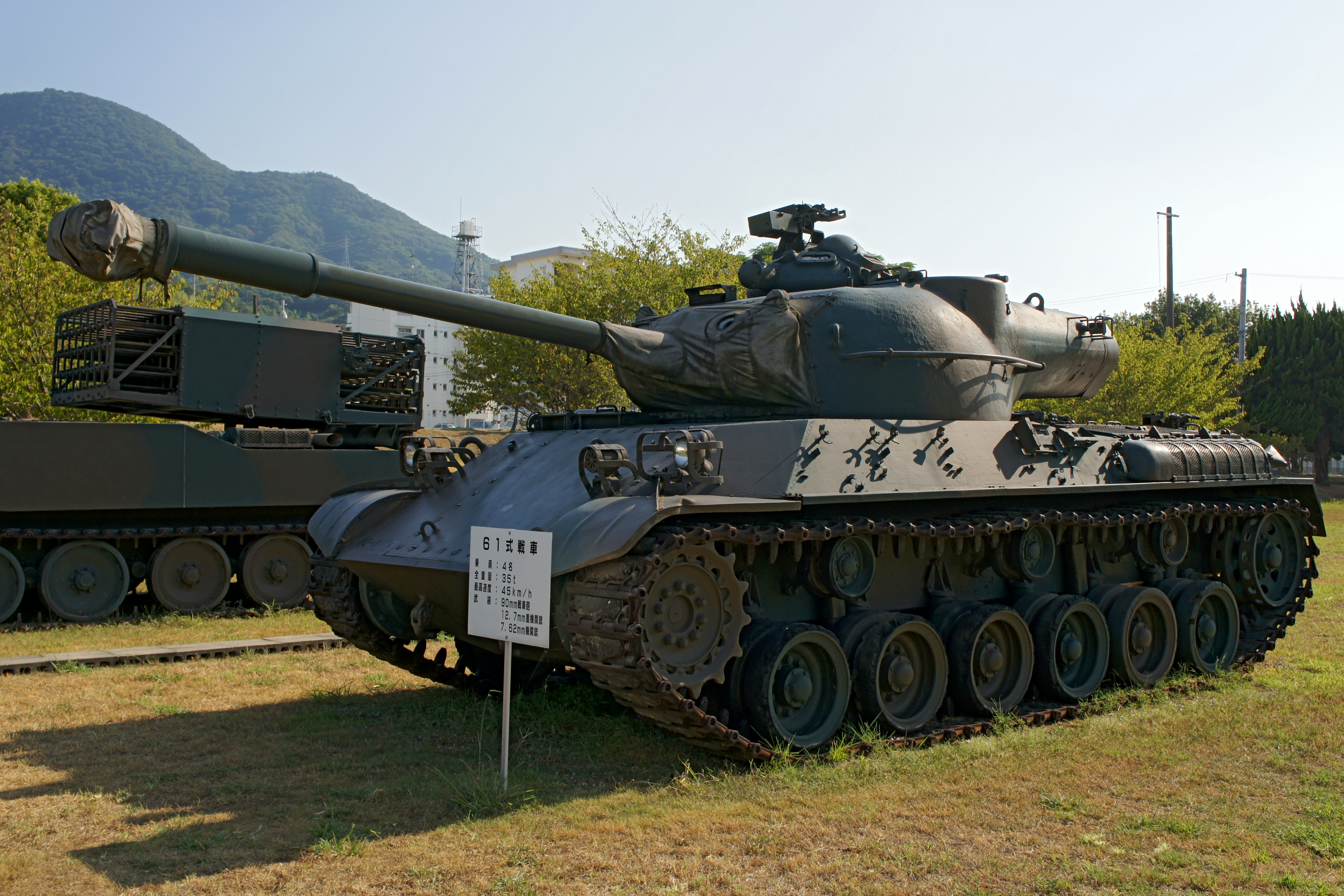
- A Type 61 tank on display at the GSDF Camp Zentsuji.
- Type: Main battle tank
- Place of origin: Japan

Service history
- In service: 1961–2000

Production history
- Designer: Mitsubishi Heavy Industries
- Designed: 1955–1960
- Manufacturer: Mitsubishi Heavy Industries
- Produced: 1961–1975
- No. built: 560

Specifications
- Mass: 35 tonnes
- Length: 8.19 / 6.03 m
- Width: 2.95 m
- Height: 2.49 m
- Crew: 4
- Armor: 55 mm (hull) – 114 mm (turret)
- Main armament: 90 mm L/52 rifled cannon, Muzzle velocity: 910m/s (M318AP-T)
- Secondary armament: 7.62 mm Browning M1919A4 machine gun 12.7 mm M2 Browning machine gun
- Engine: Mitsubishi 12HM21WT 4 stroke V type 12 cylinder vertical air cooled diesel 570 hp (430 kW) / 2100 rpm, 29600 cc
- Power/weight: 17.14 hp/tonne (12.28 kW/tonne)
- Suspension: torsion bar
- Operational range: 200 km
- Maximum speed: 45 km/h (paved roads)

The Type 61 tank (61式戦車, Roku-ichi Shiki sensha) is a main battle tank developed and used by the Japan Ground Self-Defense Force (JGSDF), built by Mitsubishi Heavy Industries.

Development started in 1955 and the vehicle was first deployed in April 1961. The type number follows the year of deployment. A total of 560 Type 61s were manufactured between 1961 and 1975, when production ceased. It was succeeded by the Type 74.

== History ==
The Empire of Japan had produced a wide range of armoured fighting vehicles. After the Surrender of Japan, however, all AFV development and construction had ceased, and Japan had lost the technology needed to build and manufacture tanks and armored vehicles. However, due to the Korean War, the Supreme Commander of the Allied Powers ordered Japan to re-militarize, forming an armed police force (initially the National Police Reserve, later called the National Security Force, and finally renamed the Japan Ground Self Defense Force) and provided M4A3E8 Sherman medium tanks and M24 Chaffee light tanks.

These tanks had seen heavy use during World War II, and after their handover to Japan they required total mechanical overhauls in only a few years. Since a large amount of parts were being consumed on the Korean peninsula, it was necessary to produce the spares used in Japan domestically, and procedural knowledge of American style tank design and maintenance began to accumulate. One bonus shared by the Sherman and Chaffee in Japanese use was that the average Japanese crewmember was of shorter stature than American soldiers, and the tanks were considered spacious by Japanese standards.

Based on this experience, the Director General of the Defense Agency ordered the Technical Research and Development Institute (技術研究本部, Gijutsu-kenkyū-honbu) to develop a new domestic tank in 1955. During the Korean War, the performance of the T-34 and M26 Pershing had made it clear that new Japanese tanks would require 90mm main guns.

Among the tank officers of the JGSDF there were two design plans for the new tanks. One was a 25-ton tank, to match the difficult terrain of Japan, with its paddy fields and weak ground. The other was a 35-ton tank, more than big enough to carry a 90mm gun. Both plans had advantages and disadvantages, but after intense discussion, the 35-ton design was adopted. (Note: Although domestic production of 25-ton tanks was not realized, M41 Walker Bulldogs made in the United States were imported instead.) From 1956 to 1960, a series of four prototypes, numbered STA1 to STA4, were produced, and testing began in 1957. STA3/4 were satisfactory for JGSDF and introduced into service in April 1961.

== Design ==
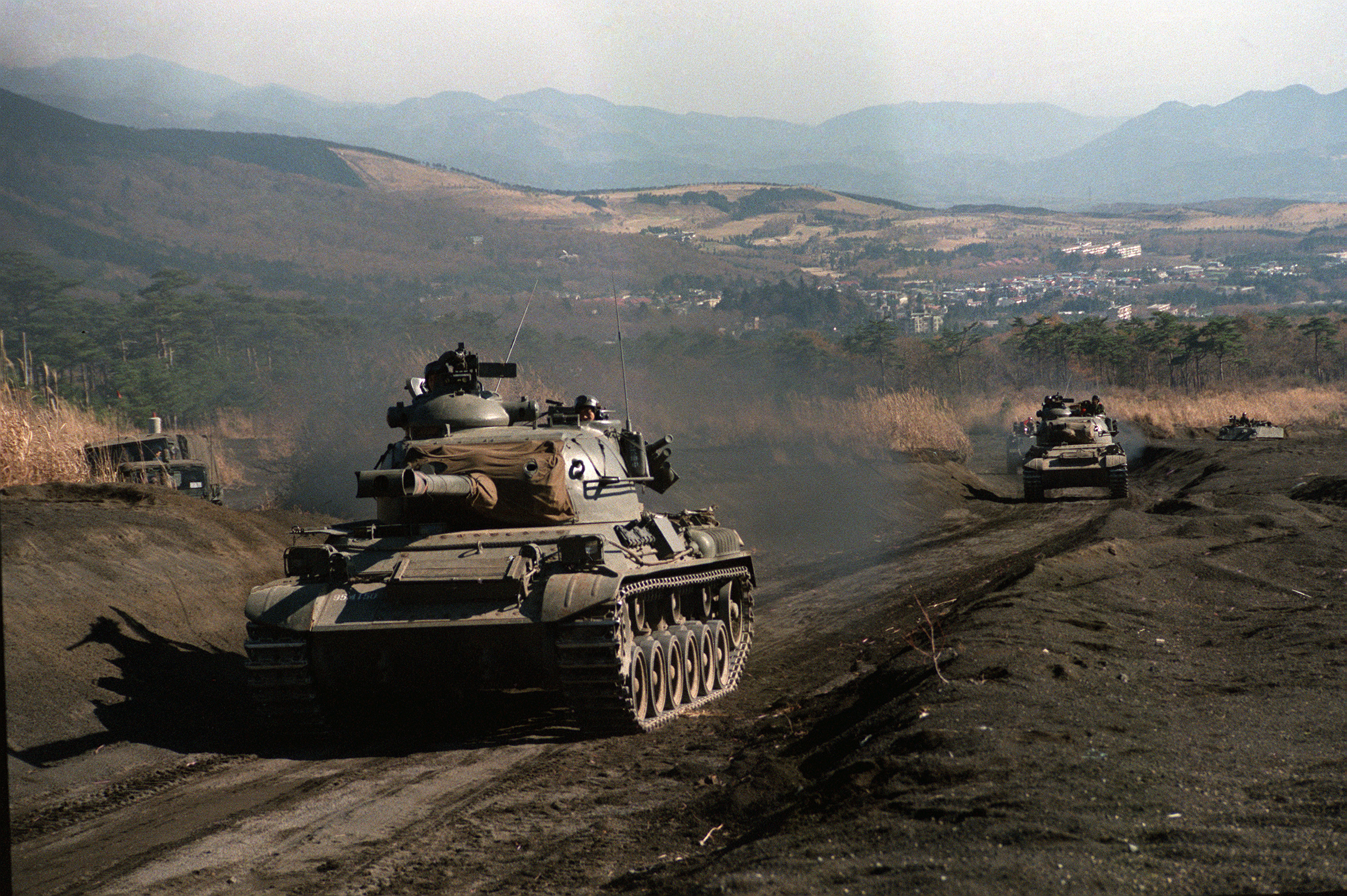
Type 61 tanks on the move in 1985 as part of a joint US/Japanese exercise.

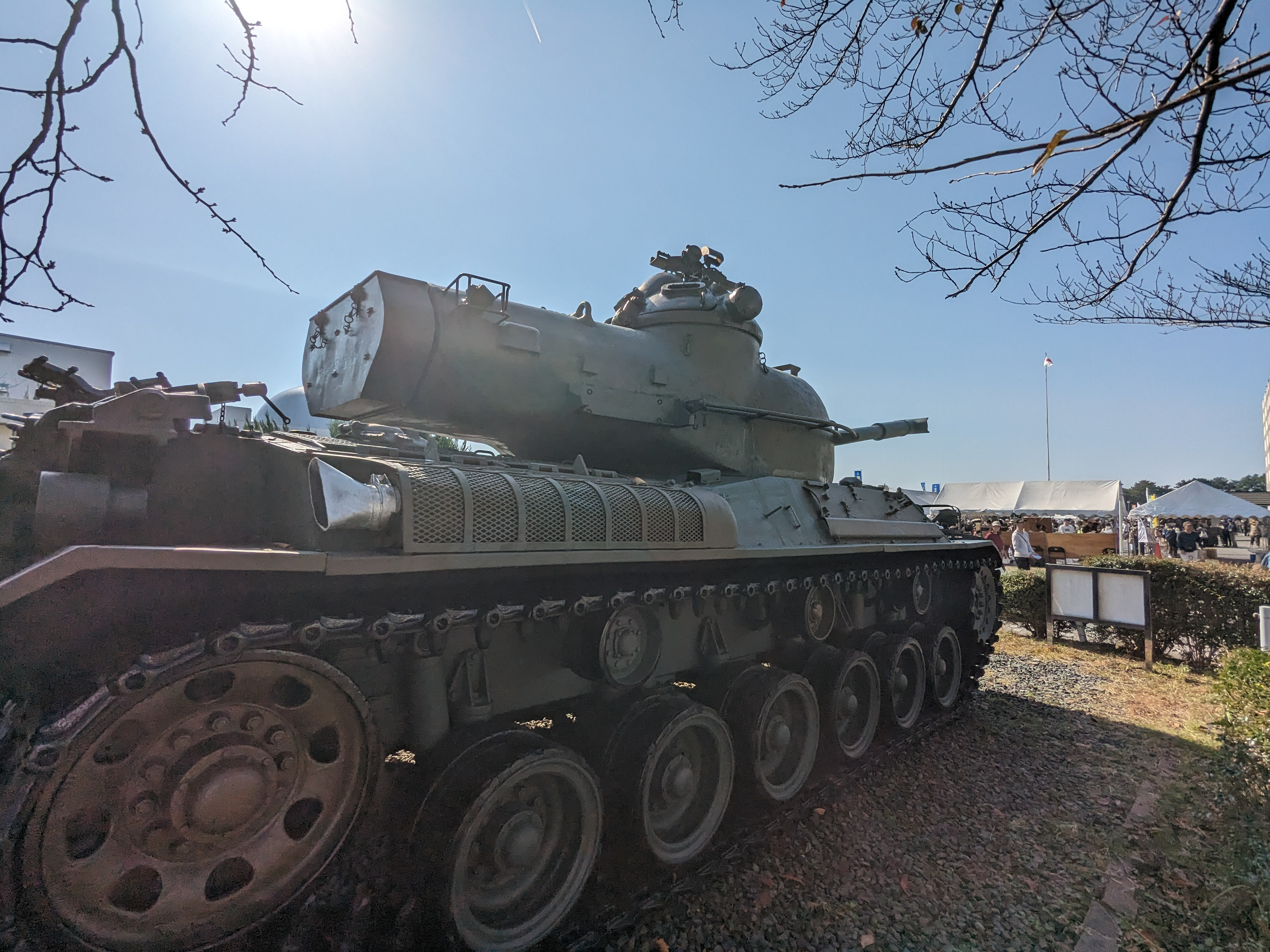
Rear view of the turret.

The Type 61 is conventionally laid out, with a central turret and the engine located at the rear of the hull. The tank has a crew of four: a commander, driver, gunner and loader. The hull is welded steel, with a cast steel turret. The maximum armour thickness is quoted as 64 millimeters. The driver sits at the front right of the hull, with a hatch immediately above him, and three vision periscopes covering the forward arc. To the driver's left is the transmission, which can be accessed for servicing by removing a large panel on the front of the hull. The commander and gunner sit in the turret on the right side, with the commander provided with a large domed cupola with a hatch on the rear of it. The gunner does not have a hatch and is seated forward of the commander.

A tool storage box was normally mounted externally on the rear of the bustle, and three smoke grenade launchers were mounted on each side of the turret. Two large radio antenna were also attached to the rear of the bustle.

=== Engine and drive ===
The tank was powered by a 570 horsepower Mitsubishi HM21 WT V12 turbocharged diesel mounted at the rear of the hull and exhausting through pipes on either side of the rear of the hull. The engine is coupled to a Mitsubishi manual transmission system which uses a controlled differential steering system. The track is driven from the front, and has six rubber road wheels on each side along with three return rollers. The suspension is a torsion bar system with the first, second and sixth road wheel fitted with hydraulic shock absorbers.

At the beginning, Japanese engineers intended to adopt the cross drive system studied by observing the repair work of the M47 Patton of the American military which was done in Japan, but did not realize it.

=== Armaments ===
An M36 tank destroyer was rented around 1955 and was used as a reference material for the mounting method of 90mm gun. During this period, tanks armed with 100 mm high-caliber cannons began to appear outside Japan, so using a similarly large calibre gun in the new domestically produced tanks was considered. But after examining the M36, 90mm ammunition was felt to be the upper limit of what an average Japanese tanker could handle effectively. Additionally, due to the mountainous landscape of Japan, it was unlikely that long range engagements would occur frequently and it was thought that a 90 millimeter gun would be sufficient.

Based on this decision, a Type 61 90 millimeter calibre rifled gun was adopted as its main gun, designed by Japan Steel Works. The gun is fitted with a t-shaped muzzle brake, which diverts firing gases sideways, and reduces the amount of dust kicked up by firing. Its breech uses a horizontally sliding breechblock for loading the fixed cartridge cases. The loader is provided with a small hatch, which has a small flap in it for ejecting spent shell cases by hand. Storage is provided for eighteen rounds in the bustle at the rear of the turret, with additional rounds being distributed in various positions inside the tank.

The commander's cupola has four vision blocks, which are angled upward, and a one-meter base stereoscopic rangefinder with x7 magnification. The gunner has a x6 magnification periscope, as well as a ×6 magnification sight.

A M1919A4 7.62 mm machine gun is mounted next to the gun as a coaxial machine gun, and a M2 12.7 mm machine gun is normally mounted on the commander's cupola for anti-aircraft use.

== Deployment history ==
The initial production rate was low, with only ten tanks produced in 1961 and 1962, increasing to twenty in 1964 and thirty in 1965 and 1966. A total of 250 had been produced by 1970, with production continuing at an increased pace until 1975, when it was terminated. A total of 560 were produced. The tanks were phased out of service in the 1990s, with 400 in service in 1990, and 190 in service in 1995.

All Type 61s were decommissioned by 2000, 39 years after their original deployment. During this period, the Type 61 received minor upgrades in the form of infrared searchlights and/or smoke dischargers. From 1980, Type 61's began to be supplemented by the more modern Type 74 MBT.

== Variants ==
- Type 67 AVLB (Armored Vehicle Launch Bridge) (67式戦車橋)
- Type 70 ARV (Armored Recovery Vehicle) (70式戦車回収車)

== Operators ==
- Japan – 560 in service between 1961 and 2000

== Sources ==
- Foss, Christopher F. (1977). Jane's World Armoured Fighting Vehicles. St. Martin's Press. ISBN 978-0312440473.
- Furuze, Mitsuharu; Ichinohe, Takao (2009). Postwar Japanese Tanks (in Japanese). Vol. 6. KAMADO. NCID BB01834038.
- Hayashi, Iwao (2005). History of Japanese tank development after the war (in Japanese). Ushio-shobō Kōjin-sha. ISBN 978-4769824725.
