= Type 89 I-Go medium tank =

Type 89 I-Go (Chi-Ro)
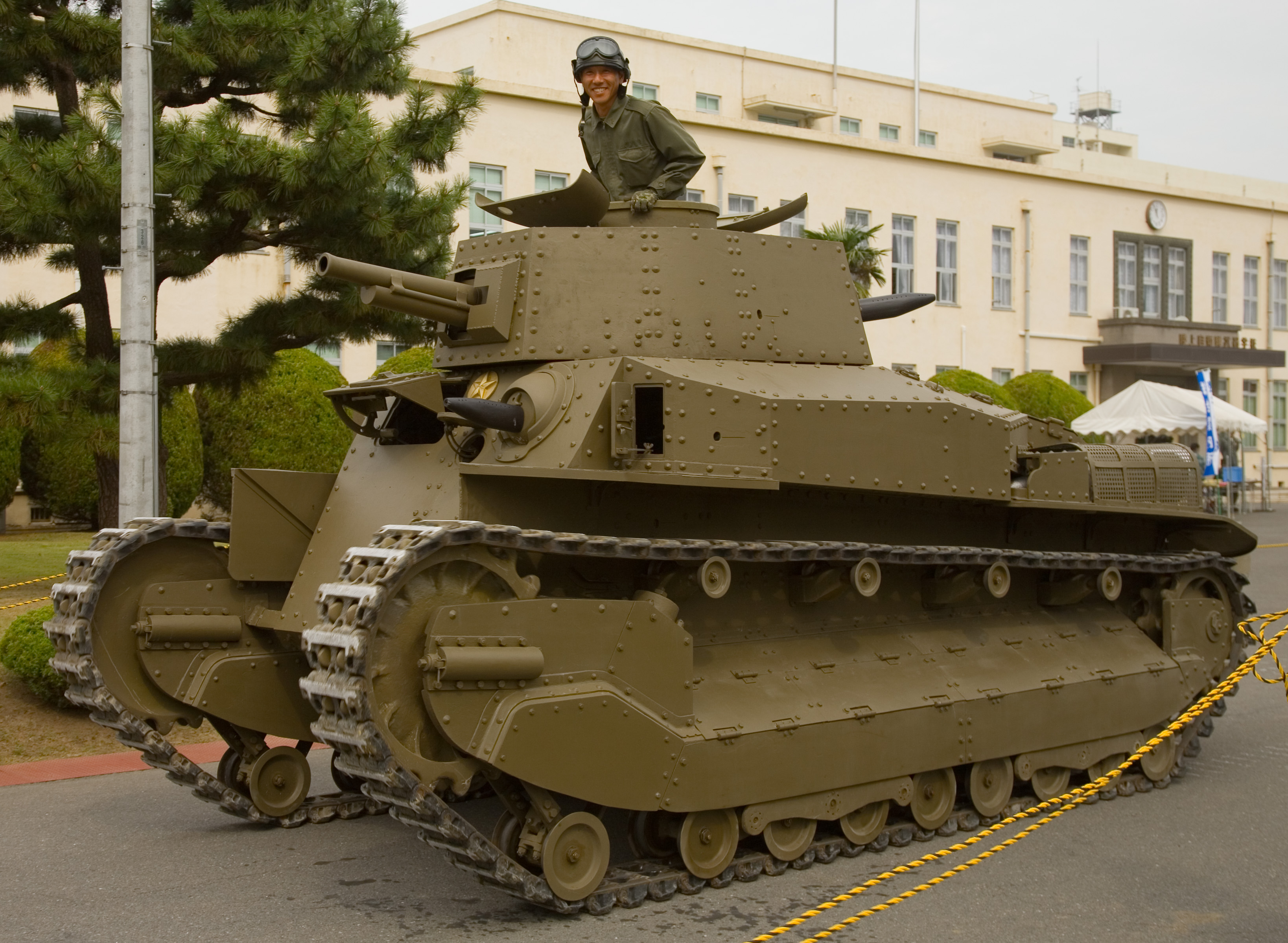
- A restored Type 89 I-Go at Tsuchiura JGSDF Base open day
- Type: Medium tank
- Place of origin: Empire of Japan

Production history
- Designed: 1928
- Unit cost: Model Otsu: 97,000 yen ($26,064 USD) in August 1939, excluding armaments
- No. built: 404

Specifications
- Mass: 12.79 metric tons (14.10 short tons)
- Length: 5.73 m (18 ft 10 in)
- Width: 2.15 m (7 ft 1 in)
- Height: 2.56 m (8 ft 5 in)
- Crew: 4
- Armor: 6 to 17 mm (0.24–0.67 in)
- Main armament: 57 mm Type 90 gun 100 rounds
- Secondary armament: 2 x 6.5 mm Type 91 machine gun (hull, turret rear); 2,745 rounds
- Engine: Mitsubishi A6120VD air-cooled inline 6-cylinder diesel 120 hp (90 kW)/ 1800 rpm 14,300cc
- Suspension: leaf spring
- Operational range: 170 km (110 mi)
- Maximum speed: 26 km/h (16 mph)

The Type 89 medium tank I-Go (八九式中戦車 イ号, Hachikyū-shiki chū-sensha I-gō) is a medium tank used by the Imperial Japanese Army from 1932 to 1942 in combat operations of the Second Sino-Japanese War, at Khalkhin Gol against the Soviet Union, and in the Second World War. The Type 89B model was the world's first mass-produced diesel engine tank. The tank was armed with a short-barrel 57 mm cannon for knocking out pillboxes and masonry fortifications, and proved effective in campaigns in Manchuria and China, as the Chinese National Revolutionary Army had only three tank battalions to oppose them, which consisted primarily of Vickers export models, German Panzer Is, and Italian CV33 tankettes. The Type 89 was a 1920s design medium tank, built to support the infantry, and thus lacked the armor or armament of 1940s generation Allied armor; it was regarded as obsolete by the time of the 1939 battles of Khalkhin Gol, against the Soviet Union. The code designation "I-Go" comes from the katakana letter [イ] for "first" and the kanji [号] for "number". The designation is also transliterated Chi-Ro and sometimes "Yi-Go".

== History and development ==
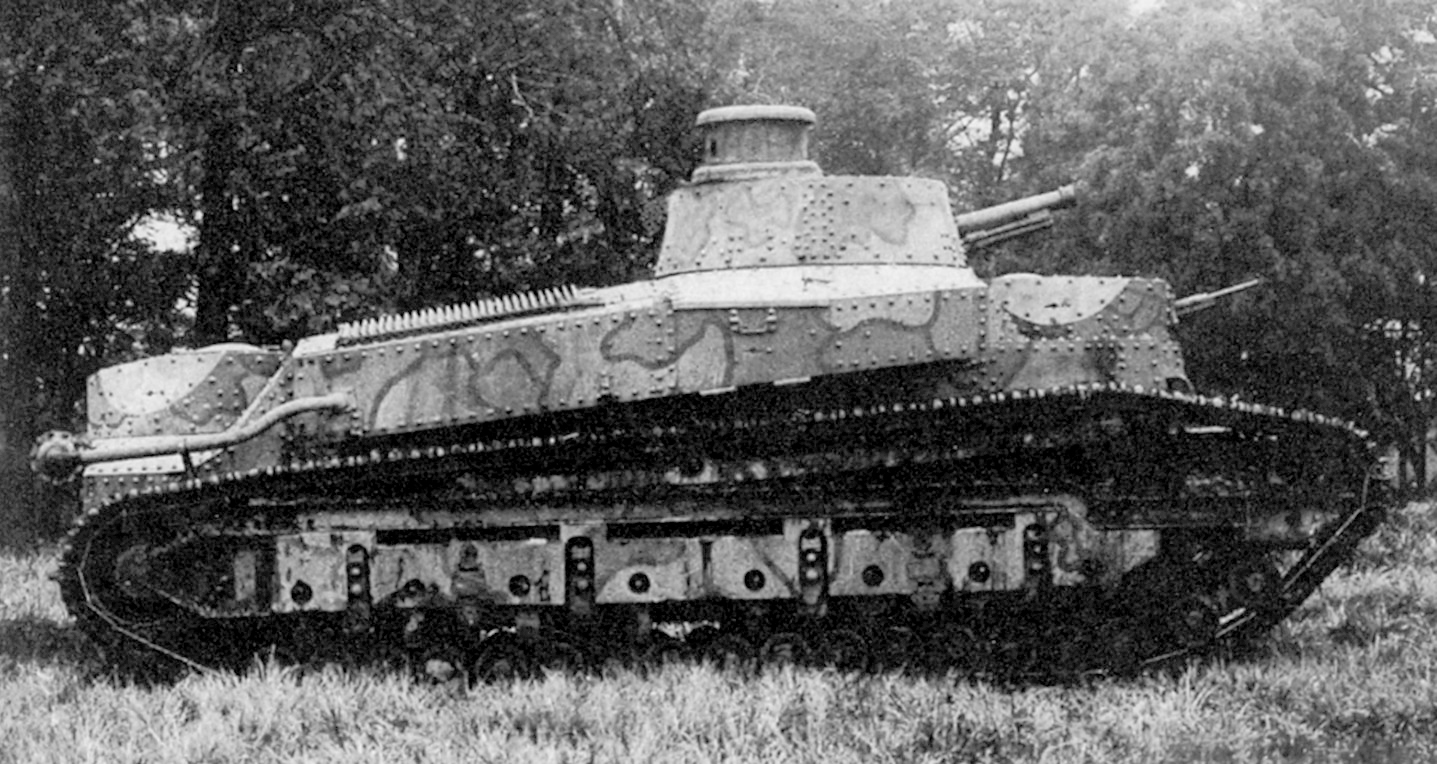
Experimental tank No.1 (試製1号戦車), 1927 (Imperial year 2587)

The Type 89 evolved from Japan's first domestic tank project initiated by the Imperial Japanese Army’s Osaka Technical Arsenal in 1925. The original plan was for two types of tanks to be created: a 10-ton light tank based on the French Renault FT tank, and a 20-ton design modeled after the Vickers medium tank. "Experimental tank No.1" a/k/a Type 87 Chi-I was completed by February 1927 and ready for field trials. However, it was 20-ton and under-powered. The weight of the initial prototype and its low speed did not impress the Imperial Japanese Army General Staff Office, and a new requirement was issued for a lighter tank, with a nominal 10-ton weight. The new design was modeled after the Vickers Medium C which had been bought by the Japanese Army in March 1927.

By April 1928, the new "light tank" design was finished. "Experimental tank No.2" was completed in 1929 and designated as the Type 89. This prototype had a Type 11 37 mm cannon as its main tank gun. However, the Type 89 was re-classified as a "medium tank" because the weight increased to over 10 tons due to improvements, including replacing the main armament with a modified Type 90 57 mm cannon. As the army's Sagami Arsenal lacked the capacity for mass production, a contract was awarded to Mitsubishi Heavy Industries, which built a new tank factory to specifically produce this model. Production of the Type 89 began in 1931 and it soon became the main battle tank of the Japanese Army.

Although the Type 89 was well regarded by the army, there were several small problems to be rectified, notably a gap under the mantlet on early models that allowed rifle fire to enter the turret. Work continued on improving the Type 89 after the production started, and as a result variants were developed.

== Design ==
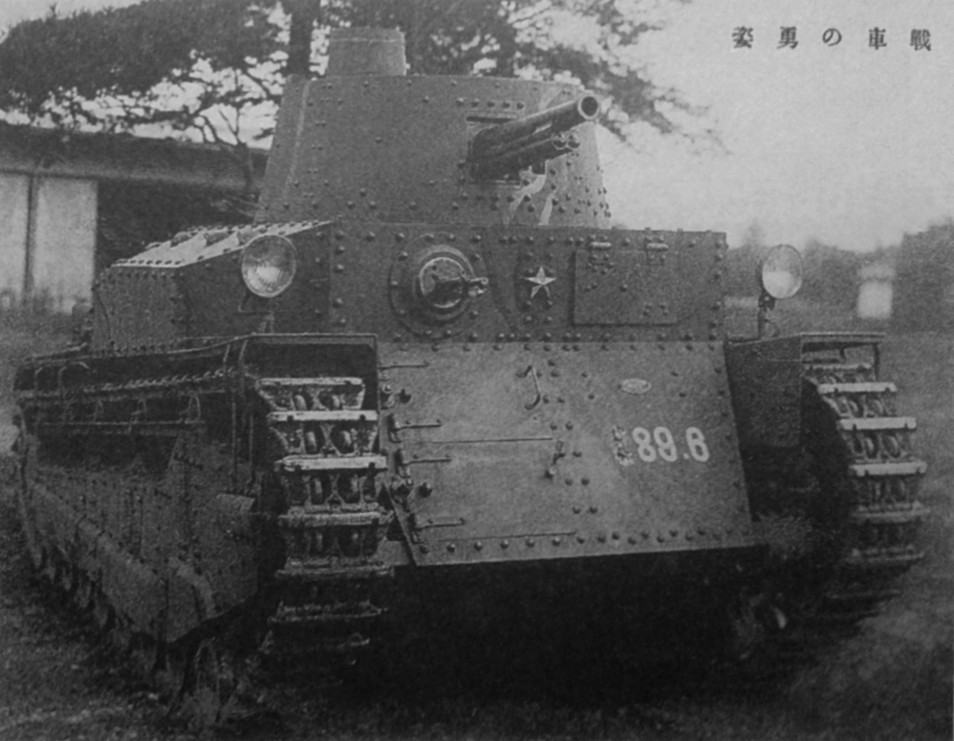
Type 89 Ko medium tank, early model

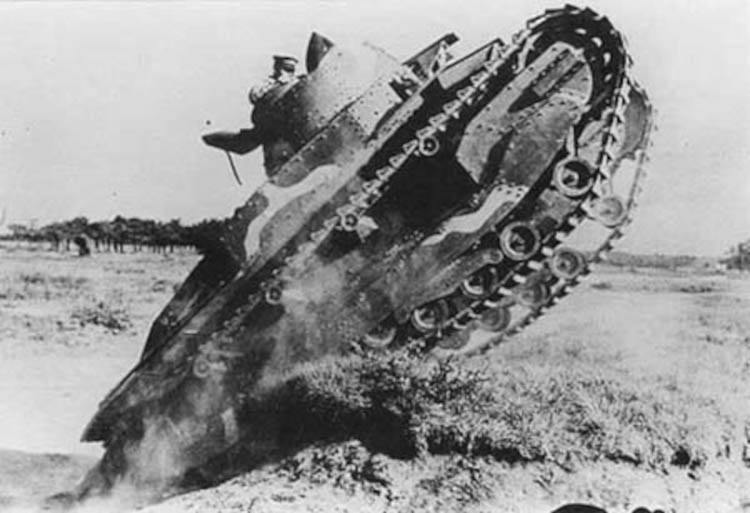
Type 89 Otsu medium tank on field trials

The Type 89 required a crew of four (commander/gunner, loader, driver and hull gunner).

The design of the Type 89 was relatively conventional with a forward-mounted gun turret carrying the main armament, a Type 90 57 mm gun that was complemented by two Type 91 6.5 mm machine guns. One was located in the front hull and the other placed in a turret ball mount pointed towards the rear, a practice followed with most Japanese tanks. The Type 90 57 mm tank gun had a barrel length of 0.85 metres (33 in) (L14.9), an angle of fire of −15 to +20 degrees in elevation and 20 degrees in azimuth, and a muzzle velocity of 380 m/s (1,200 ft/s), and could penetrate of 20 mm of armor at 500 m (0.8 in/550 yd). During the later stages of World War II, HEAT shells were developed to provide greater penetration of enemy armor.

Rather than using soft iron armor, as on the earlier Chi-I, the designers chose to use steel plate armor developed by the Nihon Seikosho Company (JSW). The type of armor was referred to as 'Niseko steel', an abbreviation of "Nihonseikosho".

The Type 89 was driven through the rear drive sprocket and featured nine bogies, mounted in pairs on each side, with the forward bogie on an independent suspension. Five smaller return wheels were mounted along a steel girder. The Type A could only communicate with signal flags. Some vehicles were provided with two searchlights for night operations. Later the Type 94 Mk 4 Hei (1934 model) radio communication device with range of 0.97 kilometres (0.6 mi) and weight of 90 kilograms (198 lb), linked with a radio antenna of 8.99 m (29 ft 6 in) in a reverse L shape was installed.

== Variants ==
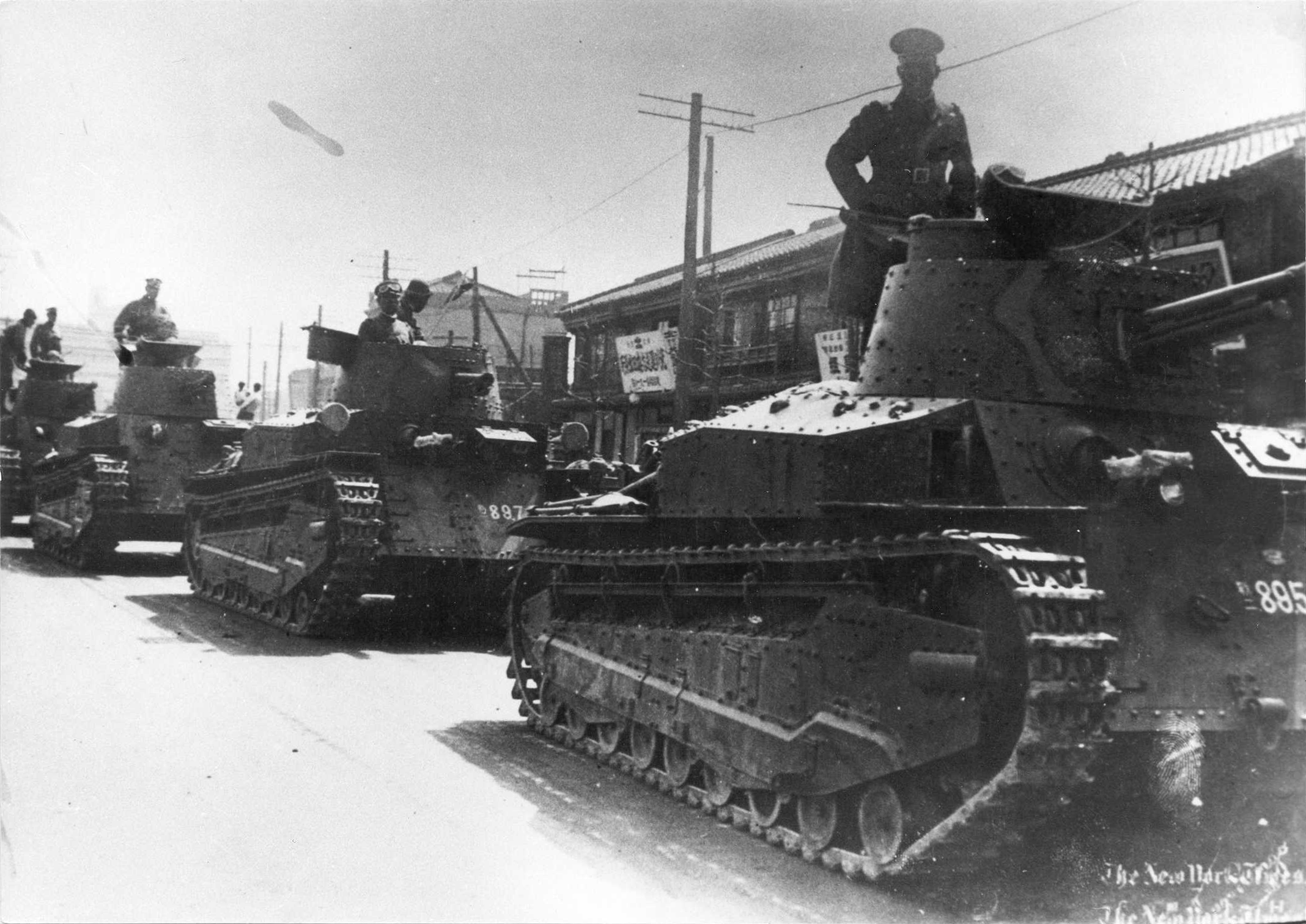
The 1st, 3rd and 4th tanks are Otsu variants, the 2nd is a Ko variant

- Type 89A I-Go Kō (八九式中戦車(甲型)) - The initial production model had a water-cooled Daimler-type 100 hp (75 kW) engine (ダ式 一〇〇馬力 発動機, da-shiki hyaku-bariki hatsudōki) 6-cylinder gasoline engine and mounted a machine gun on the right side of the hull. This design could attain only 15.5 km/h, and was also limited by the severe winter climate in northern China. A total of 113 tanks were produced.

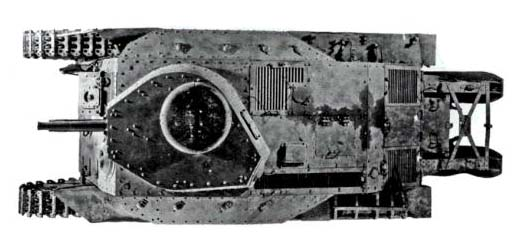
Top view of Type 89B I-Go Otsu

- Type 89B I-Go Otsu (八九式中戦車(乙型)) - The Ko was superseded in production from 1934 by the model Otsu with an air-cooled Mitsubishi A6120VD 120 hp (89 kW) diesel engine. The improved model had a new "asymmetric shaped" gun turret complete with a cupola for the commander, and with the machine gun relocated to the left side of the hull. The multiple armor plates of the front hull were replaced by a single shallow-sloped frontal armor plate which provided more protection for the driver. However, the major difference between the versions was the Mitsubishi air-cooled 6-cylinder diesel engine, which had several advantages: lower vulnerability to fire than a gasoline engine, better fuel economy, and greater torque at lower revolutions. A diesel engine was also preferred by the Japanese Army because more diesel fuel than gasoline could be produced per barrel of oil. A total of 291 Otsu tanks were produced. The Type 89B Otsu version was the first mass-produced tank with a diesel engine.

== Combat history ==
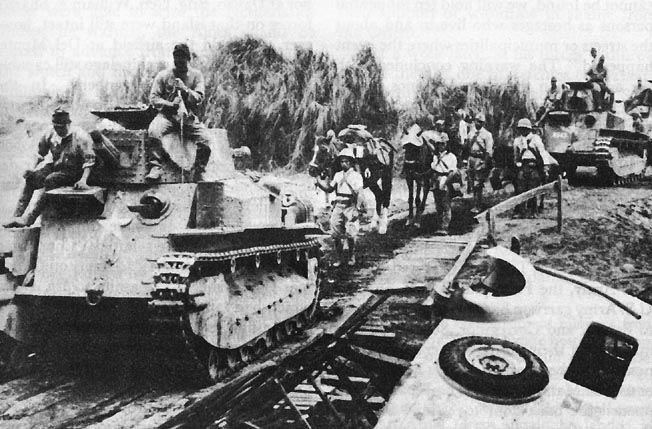
Japanese I-Go tanks moving toward Manila, January 1942.

The Type 89 served with Japanese infantry divisions and first saw combat use during the First Battle of Shanghai in 1932. The short-barreled 57 mm gun was effective at destroying machine gun nests and its 15 mm (0.59 in) armor, although thin, was enough to stop small arms fire. The relatively low speed of 25 km/h (16 mph) was not an issue in these types of operations.

The following year, the Japanese Army formed its first independent armor force by creating three regiments armed with the Type 89, each consisting of two companies with ten tanks each. Three more regiments were formed in 1934. It was deployed for infantry support operations in the Second Sino-Japanese War and in various campaigns throughout China after 1937. After the out-break of war with China, the peacetime budgetary limitations were removed and the more capable and expensive Mitsubishi Chi-Ha model was accepted as the new Type 97 medium tank by the army to replace the Type 89. Type 89s were the main medium tank of the Japanese military through 1937.

=== Battle of Khalkhin Gol ===
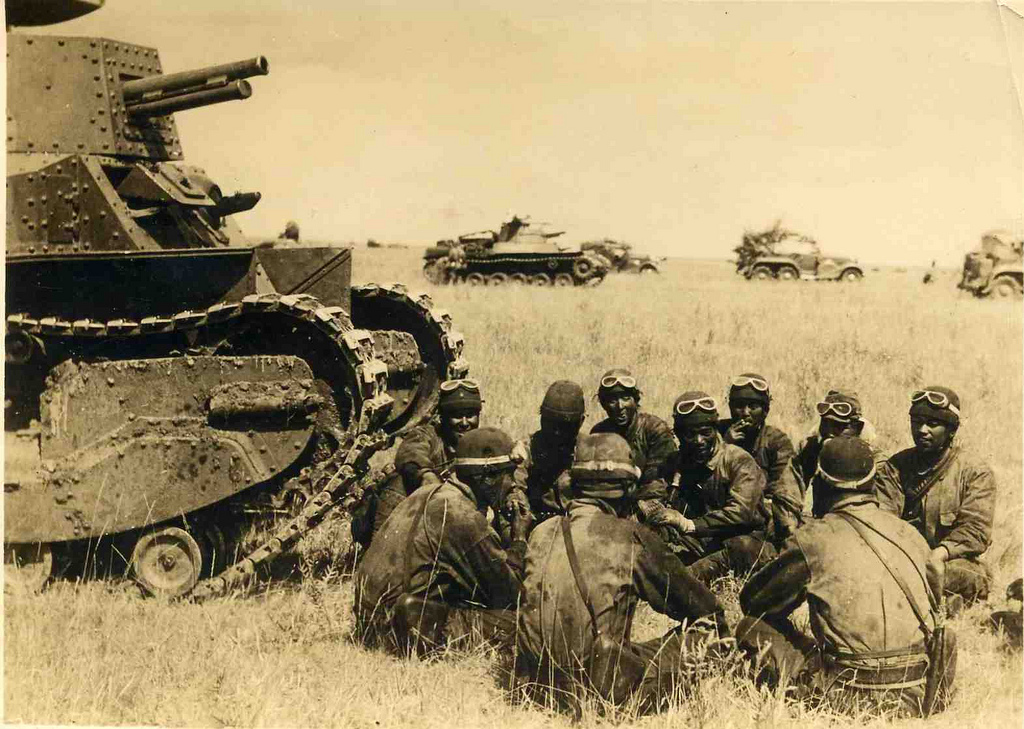
Type 89 prior to the Battle of Khalkhin Gol

On the evening of 2 July 1939, during the Battles of Khalkhin Gol, the Japanese Army's 1st Tank Corps, commanded by Lt. General Yasuoka Masaomi, launched an offensive against the Soviet Union's 11th Tank and 7th Armored brigades. The 1st Tank Corps consisted of the 3rd Tank Regiment and 4th Tank Regiment; of which the 3rd regiment consisted of 26 Type 89s, four Type 97 medium tanks, seven Type 94 tankettes, and four Type 97 tankettes, and the 4th regiment contained 35 Type 95s, eight Type 89s, and three Type 94 tankettes respectively. In this battle, the Type 97 medium tank was a newly fielded machine, and was primarily reserved for home units, as well as transitioning into Japanese Army forces stationed in China (Manchuria).

The 3rd Tank Regiment had, after charging through Soviet artillery barrages, successfully overrun the Soviet motorized infantry and taken the high ground, which had been quickly abandoned by the Soviets. However, by 2100 hours, Soviet counter battery fire had begun pounding the newly taken position, and the 3rd Tank re-positioned themselves behind the objective.

The 4th Tank Regiment, which had become separated from the 3rd Tank Regiment, advanced upon an objective under the cover of a thunderstorm that masked their movements but exposed the Soviet positions. The 4th Tank Regiment continued to advance, when suddenly a shift in the lightning flashes illuminated the advancing Japanese tanks, whereupon the Soviets immediately opened fire with anti-tank guns, heavy machine guns, and artillery. However, the range was so close that the Soviet artillery could not depress their guns far enough, and the 4th Tank Regiment was ordered to charge at about 0020 hours (12:20 am). Soviet shells passed wildly over the charging tanks as they penetrated over a thousand yards into the Soviet lines. Now isolated, and deep within the Soviet lines, the 4th Tank Regiment moved several thousands yards where they met up with Japanese infantry.

The 4th Tank Regiment had expended 1,100 37 mm and 129 57 mm tank shells during the fight, as well as about 16,000 machine gun rounds. Of the approximate 73 light and medium Japanese tanks from both regiments committed to the offensive, 13 were damaged beyond repair by Soviet gunfire, about 14 others were repaired after major overhauls, and 17 tanks were repaired in the field.

Soviet forces concluded that the 1st Tank Corps had penetrated the defenses of their 9th Armored Brigade and 149th Infantry Regiment and had reached Soviet artillery positions.

=== Other service ===
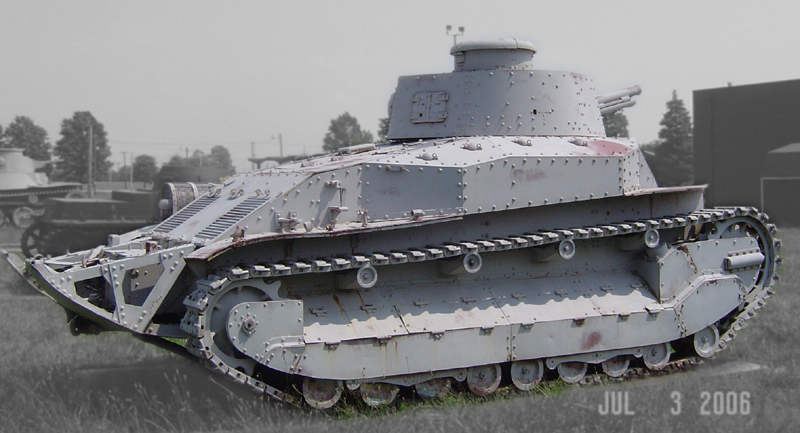
Type 89 I-Go on display at the United States Army Ordnance Museum.

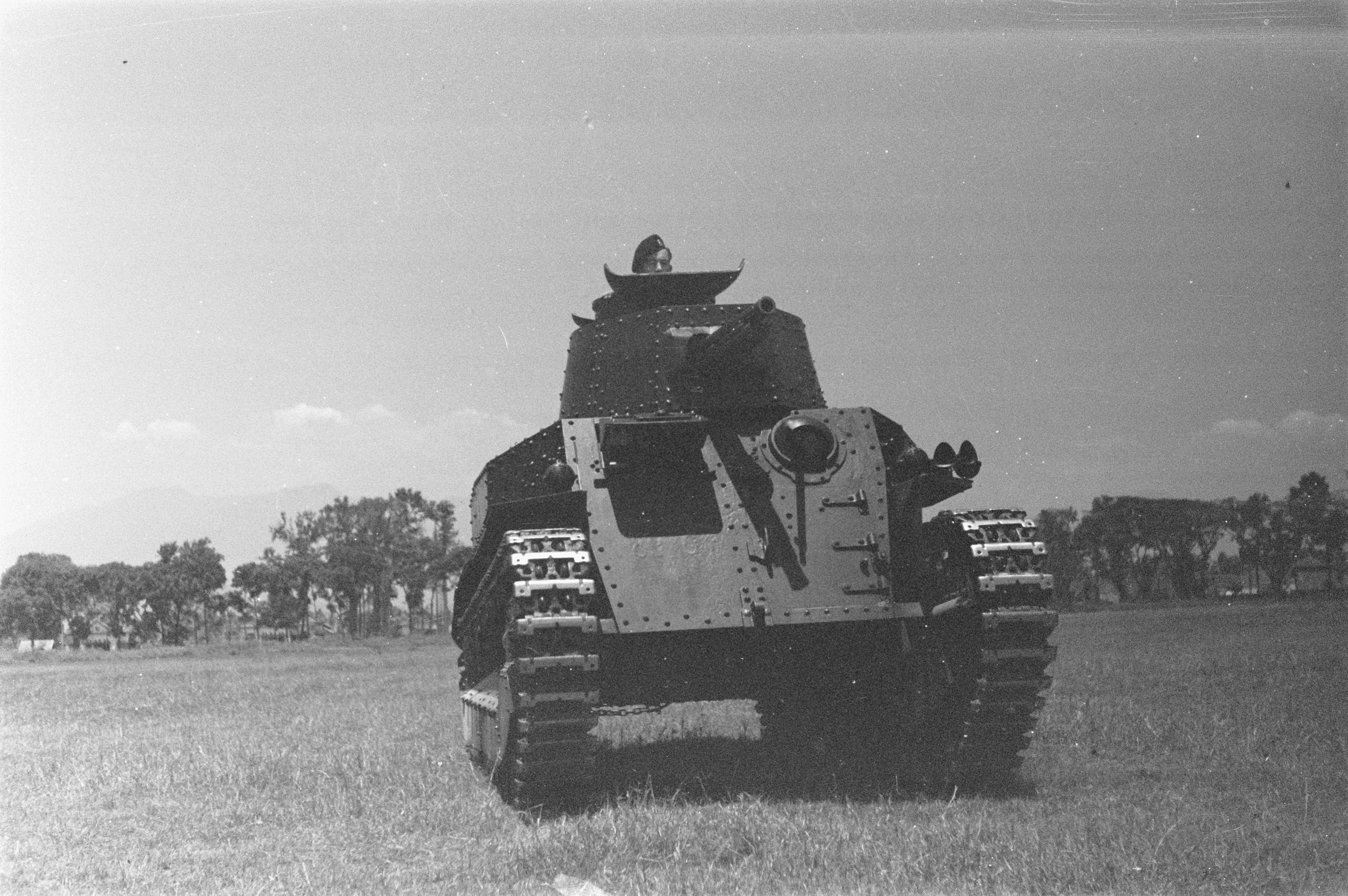
A captured Japanese Type 89 I-Go tank in use by the Dutch army in Indonesia, September 1946.

By 1942 the Type 89 was gradually being withdrawn from front-line combat service, but many units saw action in the Battle of the Philippines, Battle of Malaya, and Burma campaign, and continued to be used in China. They were also often used in static defense positions in the Japanese-occupied islands of the Netherlands East Indies and in the South Seas Mandate, but with their weak armor and low muzzle velocity main gun they were a poor match for the American M4 Sherman.

Some Type 89 tanks were used by elements of Royal Netherlands East Indies Army, such as the 1e Bataljon, 3e Regiment Infanterie (1-3 RI "De Watermannen") which used the tanks as tractors and the 1e Bataljon, 9e Regiment Infanterie (1-9 RI "Friesland") during the early period of the Indonesian National Revolution.

During the early stages of the First Indochina War, France set up an ad hoc unit of French and Japanese armour called the Commando Blindé du Cambodge from tanks left over from the Japanese invasion of French Indochina. This unit included one Type 89B tank.

== World War II Japanese units equipped with the Type 89 Tank ==
- 1st Independent Mixed Brigade
- 3rd Tank Regiment
- 4th Tank Regiment
- 7th Tank Regiment
- 2nd Independent Tank Company
- 1st Special Tank Company
- 1st Tank Battalion
- 2nd Tank Battalion
- 5th Tank Battalion
- Special Tank Company of China Detachment Tank Unit
- 7th Tank Regiment
- 8th Independent Tank Company
- 9th Independent Tank Company
- 2nd Tank Division
- Shanghai SNLF Tank Company
- SNLF Tank School at Tateyama IJN Ordnance

== Survivors ==
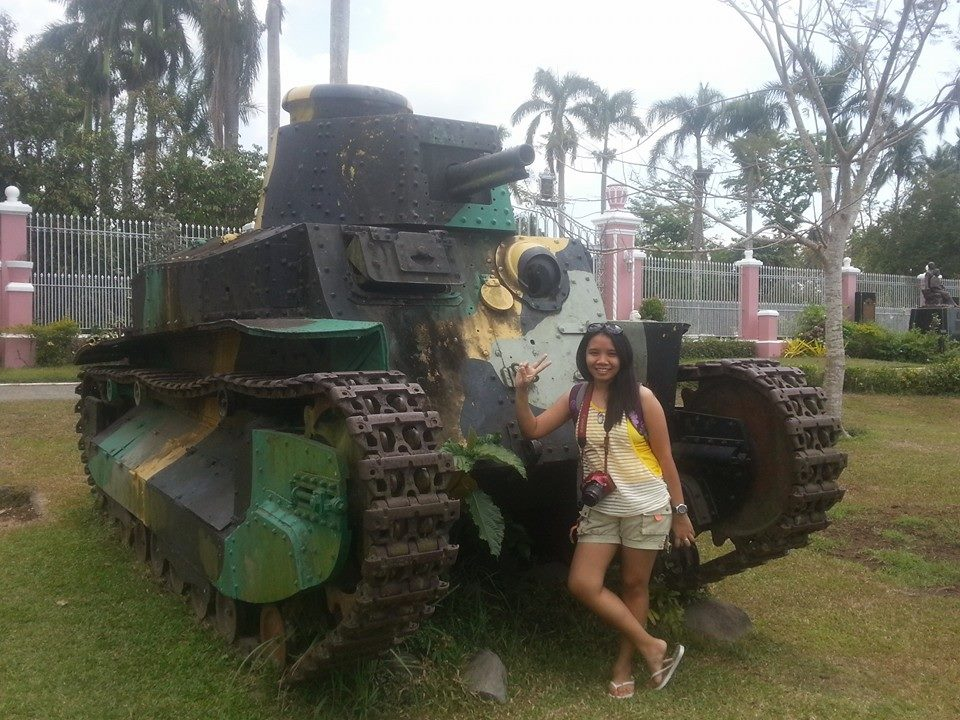
One of the many relics of Type 89s that were deployed to the Philippines during World War II is located at Villa Escudero in Tiaong, Quezon Province, Philippines.

- The Ordnance Training Support Facility, Ft. Lee, VA, US.
- The Japanese Ground Self-Defense Force base at Tsuchiura, Ibaraki, Japan. Restored to running condition.
- Sinbudai Old Weapon Museum, Camp Asaka, Japan
- Villa Escudero, Tiaong, Quezon Province, Philippines
- Kieta Memorial Park, Kieta, Bougainville Island, Papua New Guinea
- Two tanks west of Ruri Bay, Bougainville Island, Papua New Guinea
- Indonesian Army Tank School, Padalarang, West Java, Indonesia
- Two turrets in the Malaysian Army Museum, Port Dickson, Malaysia

== See also ==
- Tanks of Japan

== Sources ==
- Coox, Alvin D. (1985). Nomonhan: Japan Against Russia, 1939 (Two volumes). Stanford, California: Stanford University Press. ISBN 0-8047-1160-7.
- Foss, Christopher (2003a). Great Book of Tanks: The World's Most Important Tanks from World War I to the Present Day. Zenith Press. ISBN 0-7603-1475-6.
- Hara, Tomio (1972). Japanese Medium Tanks. AFV Weapons Profiles No. 49. Profile Publications Limited.
- McCormack, David (2021). Japanese Tanks and Armoured Warfare 1932–45. Fonthill. ISBN 978-1-78155-810-2.
- Roland, Paul (1975). Imperial Japanese Tanks. Bellona Publication. ISBN 978-0852424346.
- Tomczyk, Andrzej (2002). Japanese Armor Vol. 1. AJ Press. ISBN 83-7237-097-4.
- Zaloga, Steven J. (2007). Japanese Tanks 1939–45. Osprey. ISBN 978-1-8460-3091-8.
