= Don Placido Escudero Dam =

Historic dam in Quezon, Philippines

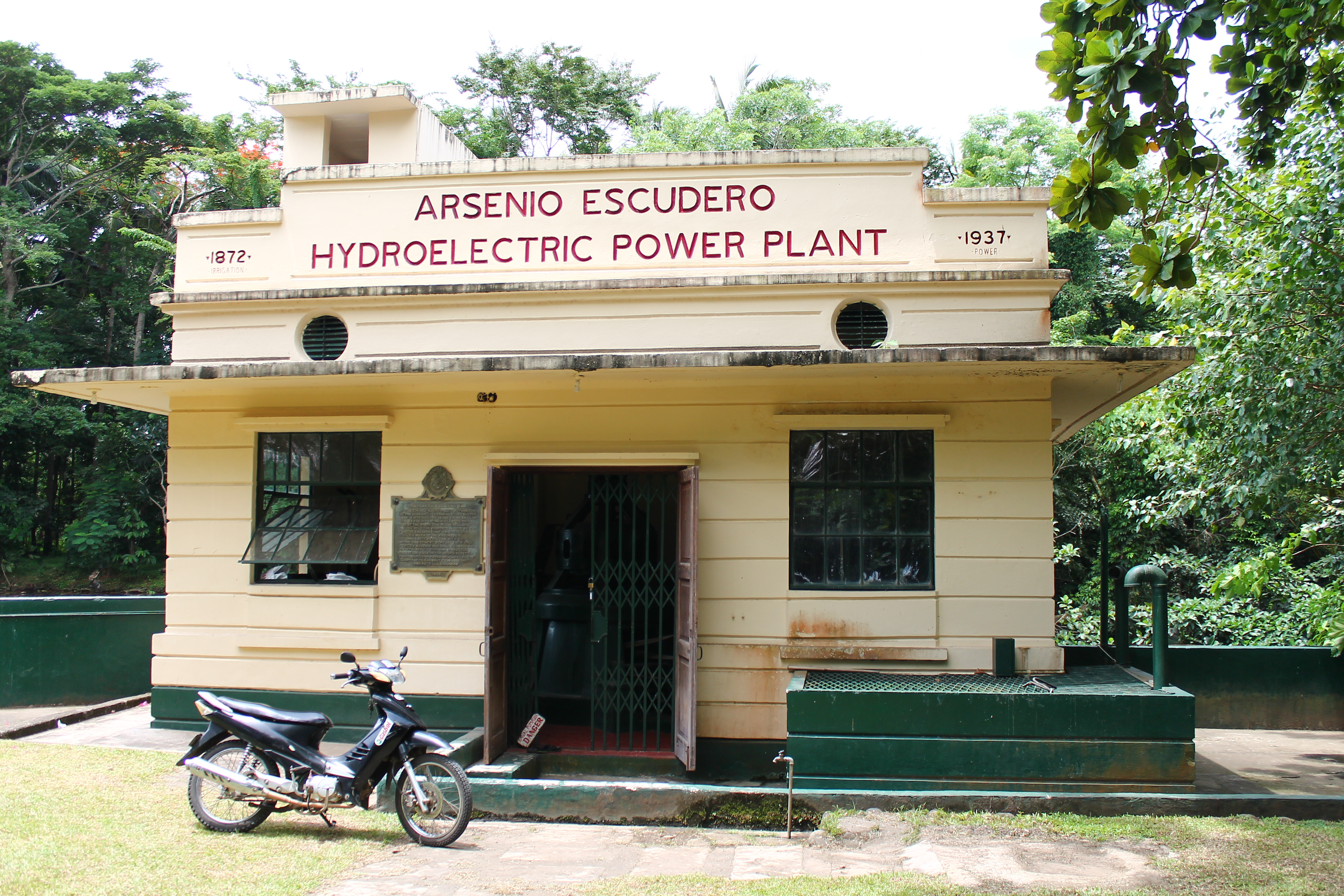

- Location in Luzon Location in the Philippines
- Interactive map of Don Placido Escudero Dam
- Country: Philippines
- Location: Tiaong, Quezon
- Coordinates: 13°59′39″N 121°20′42″E
- Construction began: 1872
- Built by: Ciriaco Nadres
- Owners: Villa Escudero Plantations and Resort

Don Placido Escudero Dam, commonly known as Labasin Dam, is a dam located in Tiaong, Quezon, Philippines. It is considered as the first mini-hydroelectric dam in the country.

== History ==
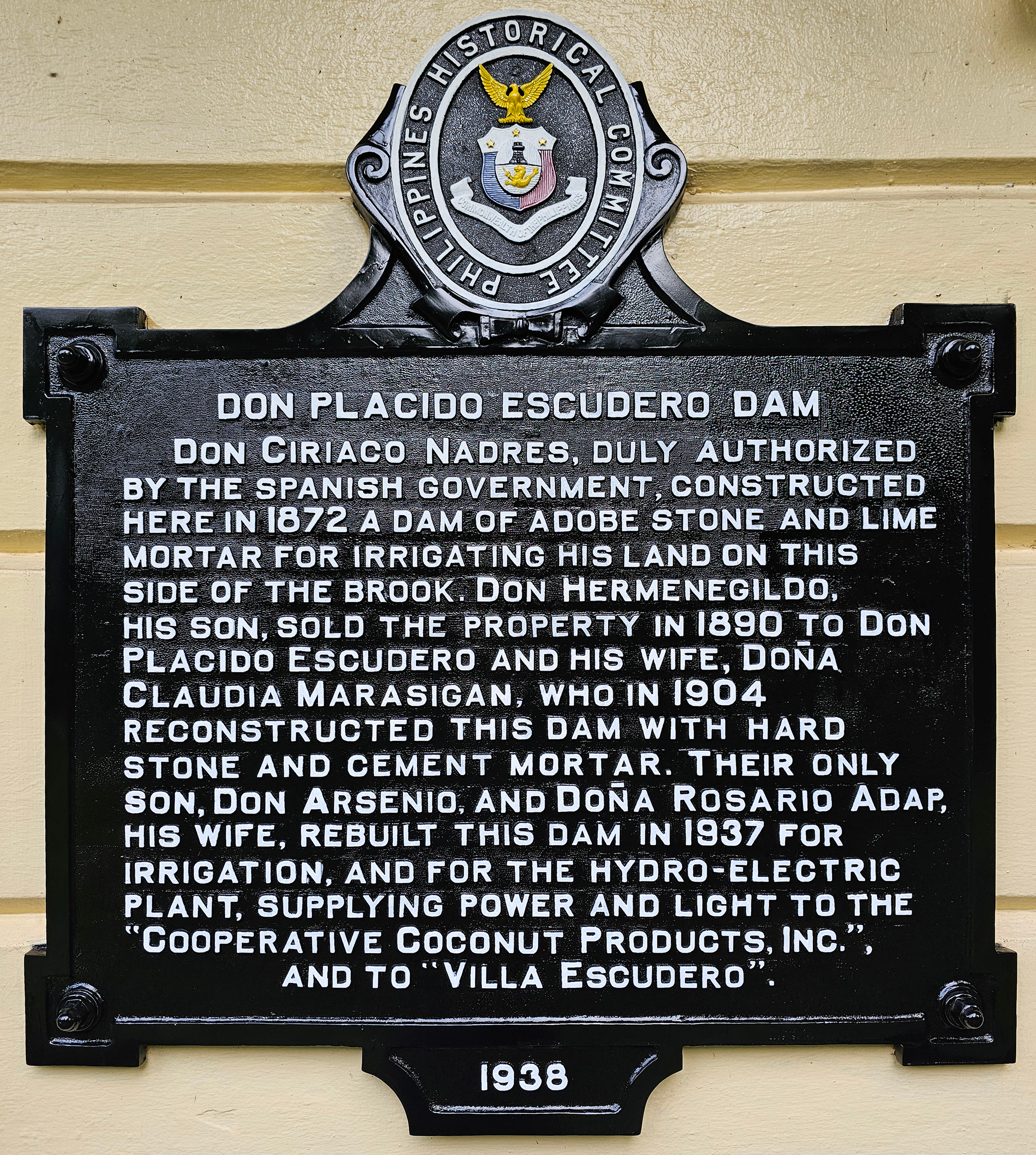
Historical marker installed in 1938

Ciriaco Nadres in 1872 constructed a dam made of adobe to irrigate his farms. His property was later sold to Placido Escudero in 1890. The dam was later enhanced in 1904 using concrete and expanded in 1937 to generate 90 KVA electricity for communities in Quezon, making it the first mini-hydroelectric dam in the Philippines.

In 1938, the Historical Research and Markers Committee, a predecessor of the National Historical Commission of the Philippines, installed a historical marker commemorating the structure as a historic site.

=== Present use ===
The dam is part of the resort Villa Escudero, which started operations in 1981 and serves as a tourist attraction in Quezon.
