= Type 87 Chi-I medium tank =

First Japanese experimental medium tank

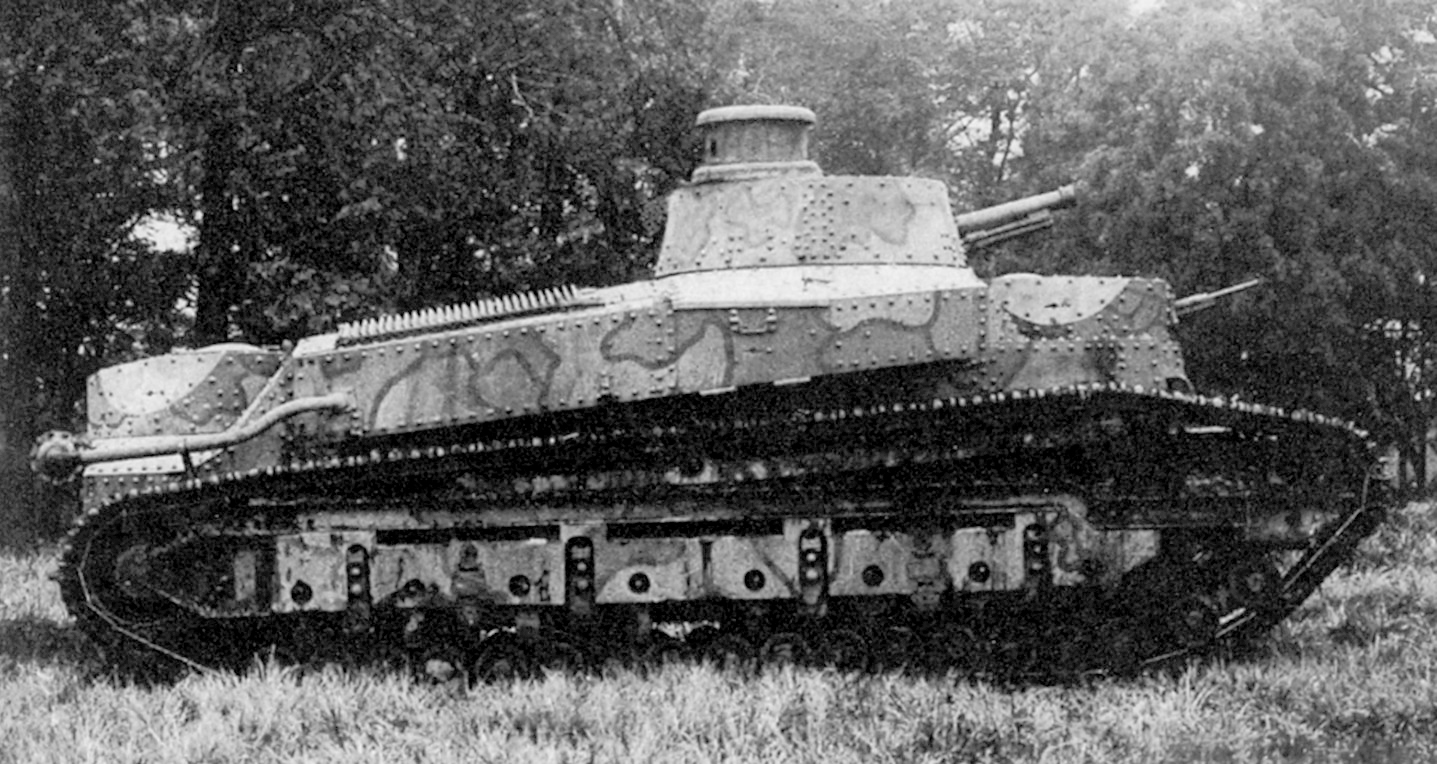
- Experimental tank No.1 (Type 87 Chi-I), 1927
- Place of origin: Empire of Japan

Production history
- Designed: 1925
- No. built: 1

Specifications
- Mass: 20 metric tons (22 short tons)
- Length: 6.03 m (19 ft 9 in)
- Width: 2.40 m (7 ft 10 in)
- Height: 2.78 m (9 ft 1 in) with cupola
- Crew: 5
- Armor: 6 to 17 mm (0.24–0.67 in)
- Main armament: 57 mm Type 90 gun, 110 rounds
- Secondary armament: 2 x 7.7 mm machine guns (hull, turret rear), 5,000 rounds
- Engine: Mitsubishi V-8-cylinder gasoline engine 140 hp
- Suspension: parallelogram
- Operational range: 170 km (110 mi)
- Maximum speed: 20 km/h (12 mph)

The Type 87 Chi-I medium tank a/k/a Experimental tank No.1 (試製1 号戦車) was the first indigenously designed tank produced by Japan for the Imperial Japanese Army. Development of this medium tank began in June 1925 and was completed by February 1927. During the field trials, the tank proved to be too heavy and under-powered. The project was cancelled and a new light tank design was finished by April 1928 and designated the Type 89 I-Go.

== History ==
Development of the first Japanese-designed tank began in June 1925. The original plan was for two types of tanks to be created. A light tank at 10-ton based on the French Renault FT tank and a 20-ton design modelled after the British Vickers tanks. A team of four engineers in the motorcar group of the Technical Bureau participated in the development of the medium tank, including Major Tomio Hara. Major Hara later became the head of the tank development department and would rise to the rank of general. According to Hara, the first task on the agenda was to develop an indigenous medium main battle tank.

The Army Technical Bureau set out the specifications, including:

1. To be able to attack "strong field positions" but also have mobility.
2. Equip the tank with a 57 mm main gun and front and rear mounted machine guns for "effective" fire power.
3. Armor plating to withstand at least a 57 mm anti-tank gun.
4. Capable of trench crossing of 2.50 m, and climbing capabilities of 43 degrees.
5. A complement of 5 crew members.
6. A width and height which allows railway transportation.
7. A tank able to be operated and driven by one driver.
8. An operational duration of at least 10 hours.

=== Naming system for weapons ===
Like all weapons, the year of introduction is the first criteria. That year is computed on the historical calendar of Japan, starting 660 years BC. Therefore, "Experimental tank No.1" was given the standardized designation Type 87, as it was introduced in 1927, the year 2587 of the Japanese calendar (only the two last digits of the year being used). The subsequent Type 89 I-Go prototype was known as "Experimental tank No.2", leading to the designation Type 89 when standardized as it was introduced in 1929, the year 2589 of the Japanese calendar.

== Development and testing ==
The specifications of the Army Technical Bureau were given to the 4th Military Laboratory of the Okubo District. The team started their design and worked hard to complete the project within the two years allocated. The team had to design everything from the ground up, including the nuts and bolts to be used. The tank design was completed in May 1926 and production was ordered to begin at the Osaka Army Arsenal. At the time, there was little heavy industry allocated to the production of motor vehicles in Japan, so there were significant difficulties creating the prototype. The prototype was completed by February 1927, within the required period and ready for field trials.

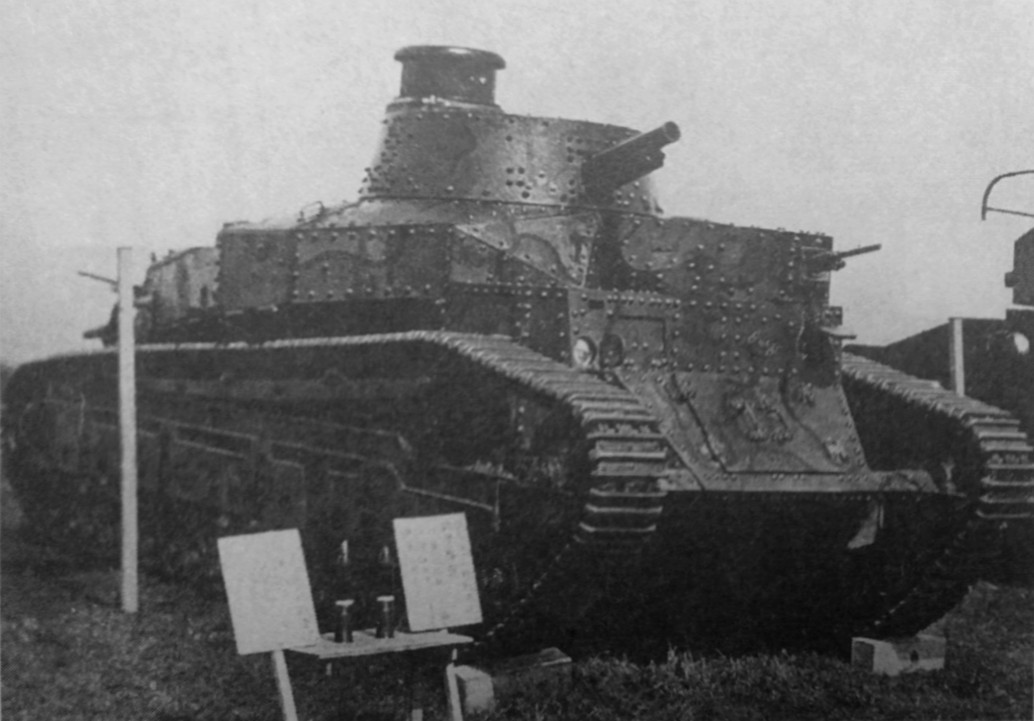
Front-angle view of the Chi-I

The Chi-I had a Type 90 57 mm cannon as its main armament with 110 rounds of ammunition, and two 7.7 mm machine guns (hull, turret rear), with 5,000 rounds of ammunition. The armour was riveted steel plates with a minimum thickness of 6 mm and a maximum of 17 mm. The engine compartment was located in the middle of the hull and the tank was powered by a V8 gasoline engine. Features of the design were adopted from the British Vickers A1E1 Independent tank. The tank chassis had a complex parallelogram suspension system with two pairs of road bogie wheels per leaf spring arrangement. Hara later designed a bellcrank scissors suspension, which paired the bogie wheels and connected them to a coil spring mounted horizontally outside the hull. This suspension became standard on the majority of the subsequently designed Japanese tanks and can be seen on the Type 95 Ha-Go light tank and Type 97 Chi-Ha, as examples.

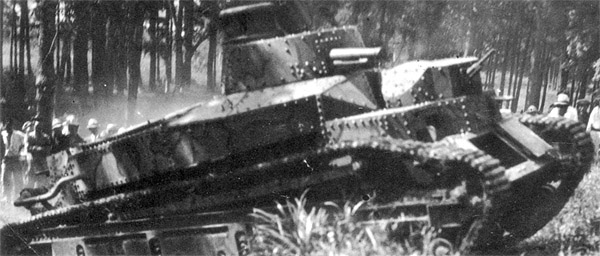
Chi-I undergoing field trials, June 1927

Many generals and staff of the Imperial Japanese Army attended the field trials of the Chi-I at the Fuji Training Grounds. However, the tank weighed in at approximately 20-tons when fully loaded and was under-powered as the V-8 engine only produced 140 hp. The heavy weight of this initial prototype and its low speed did not impress the Imperial Japanese Army General Staff Office, and a new requirement was issued for a lighter tank, with a nominal 10-short-ton (9.1-metric-ton) weight. The new design was modeled after the Vickers Medium C, which had been bought by the Japanese Army in March 1927.

By April 1928, the new lighter tank design was finished. The prototype was completed in 1929 and designated as the Type 89 I-Go. The Type 89 Chi-Ro (also known as the Type 89 I-Go) was developed to overcome the shortcomings of the Chi-I. The Type 89 was subsequently re-classified as a "medium tank" because the weight increased to over 10 tons due to improvements. Still, the Type 89 was lighter and shorter than the Chi-I, but had increased armour plating. As the army's Sagami Arsenal lacked the capacity for mass production, a contract was awarded to Mitsubishi Heavy Industries, which built a new tank factory to specifically produce this model. Production of the Type 89 began in 1931 and it soon became the main battle tank of the army.

== See also ==
- Tanks of Japan
