= Villa Escudero =

Agricultural estate and resort in Quezon, Philippines

Coordinates: 13°59′42.48″N 121°20′31.53″E

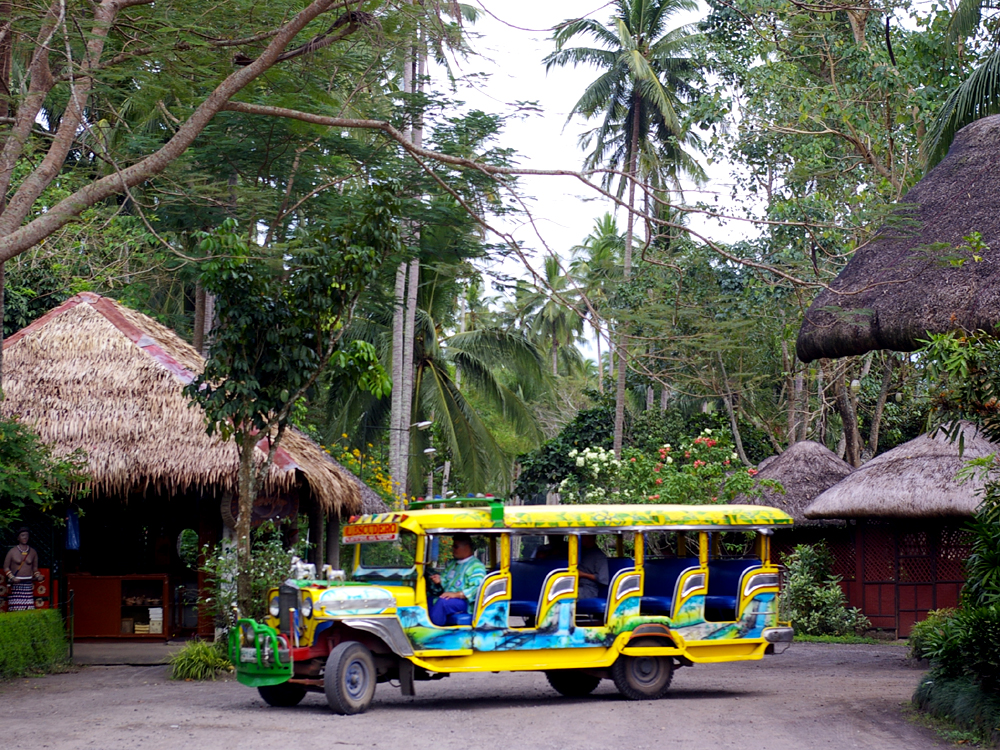
A jeepney takes tourists around the Villa Escudero grounds in San Pablo, Laguna, Philippines

Villa Escudero Plantations and Resort (Tagalog: [ˈbɪlja ʔɛskʊˈdero]) is an 800 hectares (2,000 acres) of working coconut plantation and hacienda in Tiaong, Quezon, 10 kilometres (6.2 mi) south of the city of San Pablo, Laguna on the border with Quezon. Since 1981, the plantation has opened its doors as a resort offering village tours, a museum tour, food and accommodations. It has developed a worldwide reputation as a focal point to experience Philippine culture and history in a beautiful rural setting.

== Location ==
The plantation spreads across three municipalities located in two provinces: San Pablo in Laguna and the towns of Tiaong and Dolores in Quezon Province. The entrance to the resort is located just a few feet from the Laguna and Quezon boundary arch.

== History ==
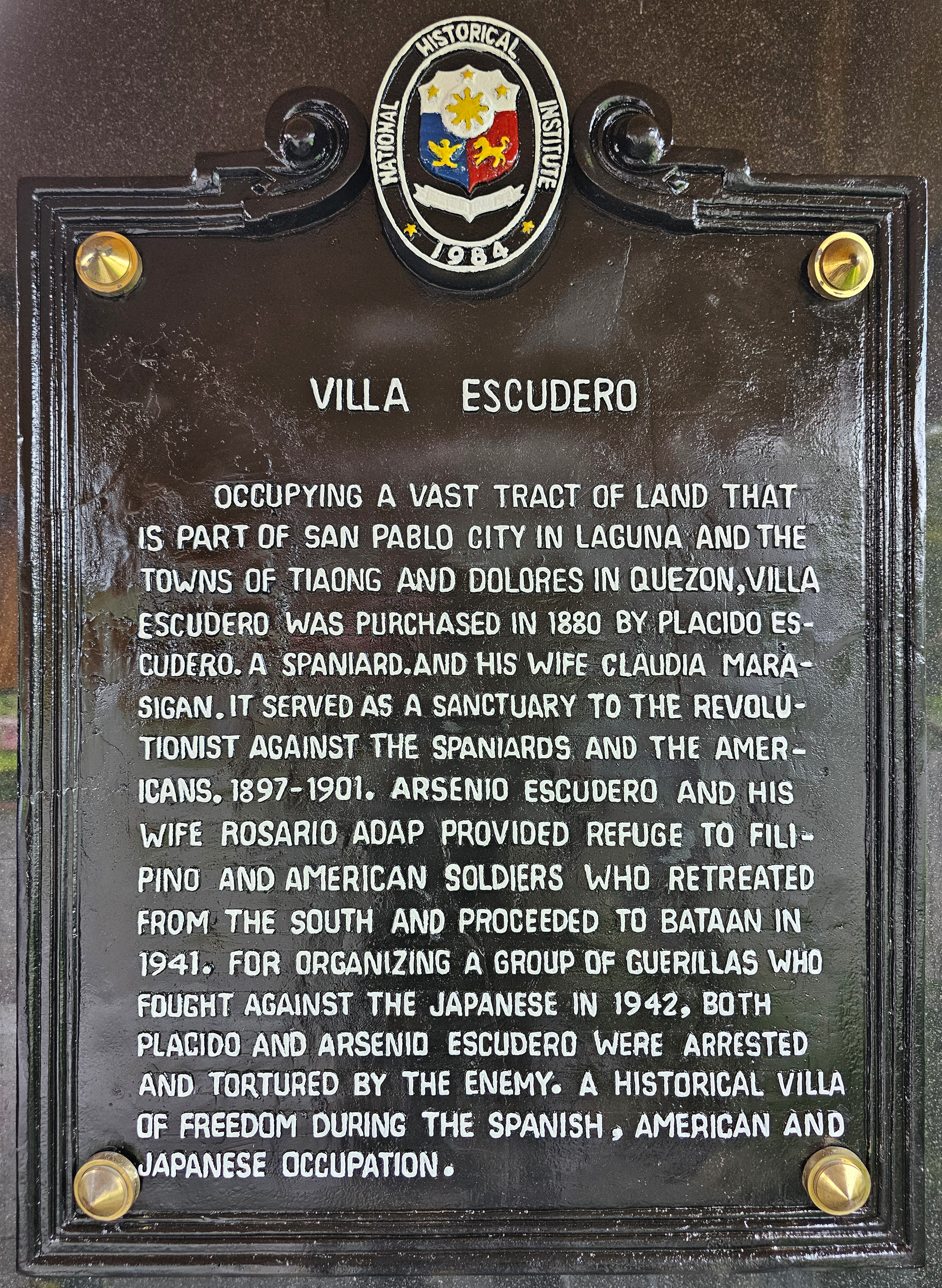
National historical marker installed in 1984

Villa Escudero Plantations was founded in 1872 by Don Plácido Escudero and his wife, Doña Claudia Marasigan. Originally a sugar cane plantation, the crop was converted to coconut by their son, Don Arsenio Escudero, in the early 1900s. A pioneering agriculture industrialist, he built the country’s first working hydroelectric plant, the Labasin Dam to supply his desiccated coconut factory and the Escudero Plantation house, which he and his wife, Doña Rosario Adap, built in 1929.

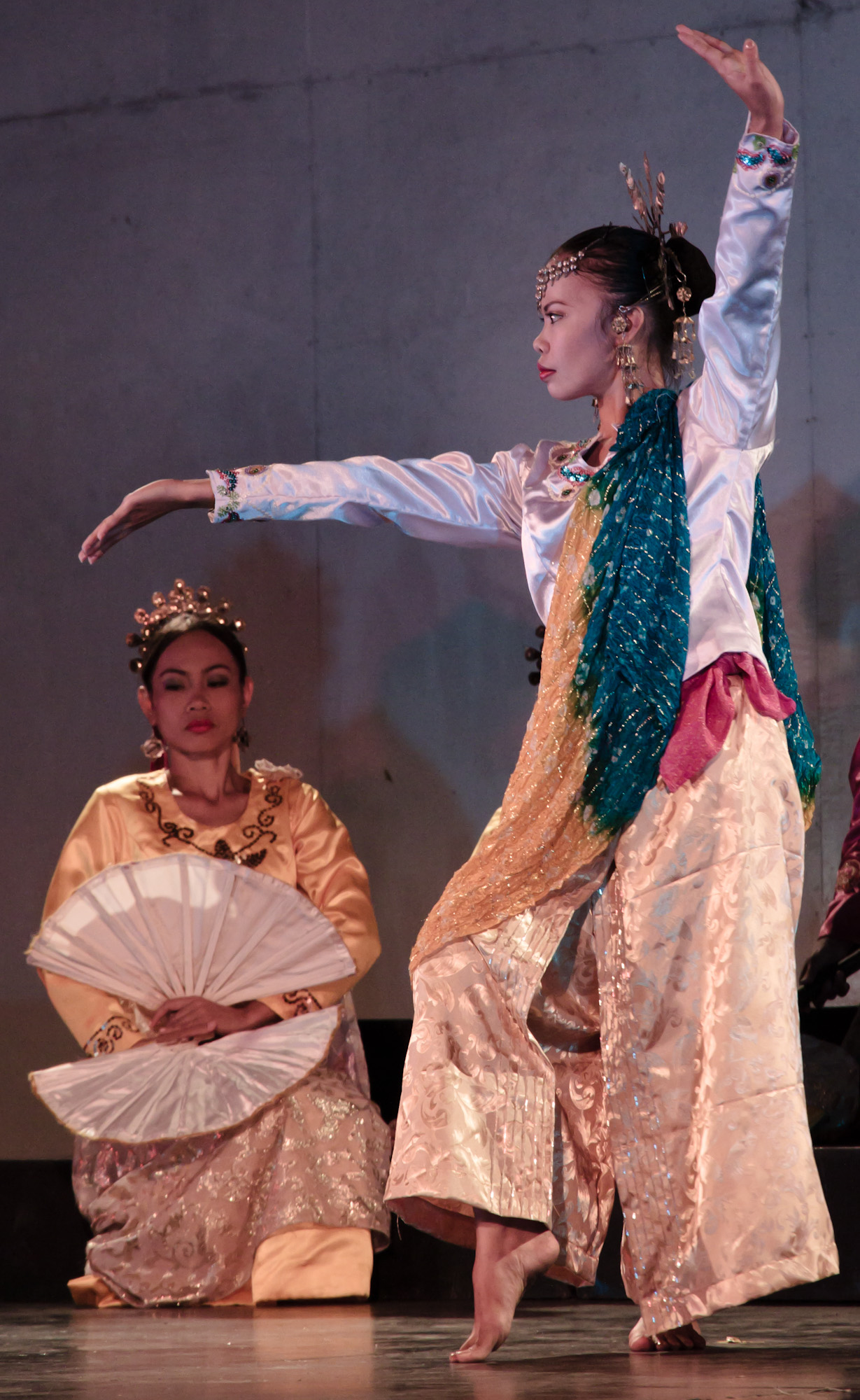
Dancing performance during the show at Villa Escudero

The plantation was opened to the public in 1981 as a tourist attraction offering glimpses of plantation life. The family's eclectic private collection formed a museum. Carabao cart ride takes visitors to the resort area, surrounded by a park-like setting while being serenaded by locals. Dining is offered in a unique al fresco restaurant where the dining tables are situated below the spillway of the hydroelectric dam (the Labasin waterfalls) while diners enjoy their lunch dipped in the flowing calf-deep water. Later attractions include an authentic live cultural dance show choreographed by National Artist, Ramon Obusan, performed with live music. The resort has since expanded, offering accommodations, more restaurants, sports facilities, and a conference center.

In 2008, 415 hectares (1,030 acres), more than half of the estate, was converted into an exclusive residential development called Hacienda Escudero.

== Museum ==
The Escuderos have been a well-known family in Quezon since the late 1800s. The museum contains the private collections of the family from their local travels and from around the world. It was started by Arsenio and Rosario Escudero and passed on to the living generations of the family. The assorted collections include, among others, religious artifacts, Chinese porcelain, antique furniture, ethnic clothing, relics from the Second World War, clothes of Philippine presidents, butterfly collections, up to Jose Rizal's letters in his slumbook. In 1987, the extensive collection was moved and exhibited in the church of the plantation. A visit to the museum is included with the admission.

== Labasin Lake ==
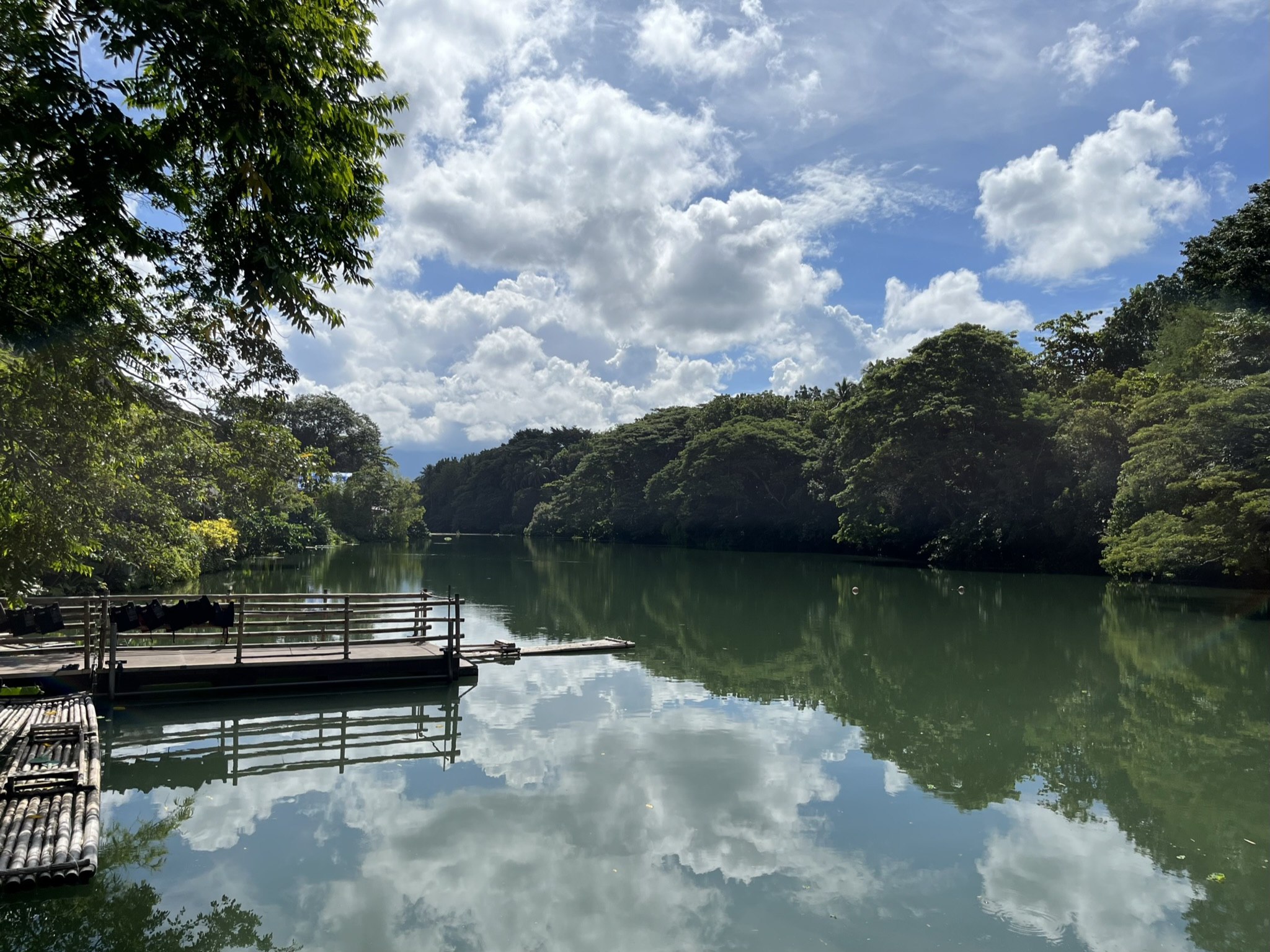
Lake Labasin

Labasin Lake is the narrow lake or reservoir created by the Labasin hydroelectric dam. One of the amenities provided by the resort to visitors is rafting and native bamboo rafts are available and are included with the day tour. Some accommodations made with native materials are beautifully set protruding by the lake.
