= Commando Blindé du Cambodge =

The Commando Blindé du Cambodge ("Cambodia Armored Commando") was a military formation during the French Protectorate of Cambodia. The ad-hoc unit consisted of 11 commandeered Japanese tanks, some Renault UE Chenillette tankettes, and Ford trucks. Officially created on September 16, 1945 and attached to the Cambodian commando group, it was the first armored unit of the French Far East Expeditionary Corps. He became the 8th squadron of the 5th cuirassiers regiment on September 15, 1946.
