= Tiaong =

Municipality in Quezon, Philippines

- Municipality
- Municipality of Tiaong
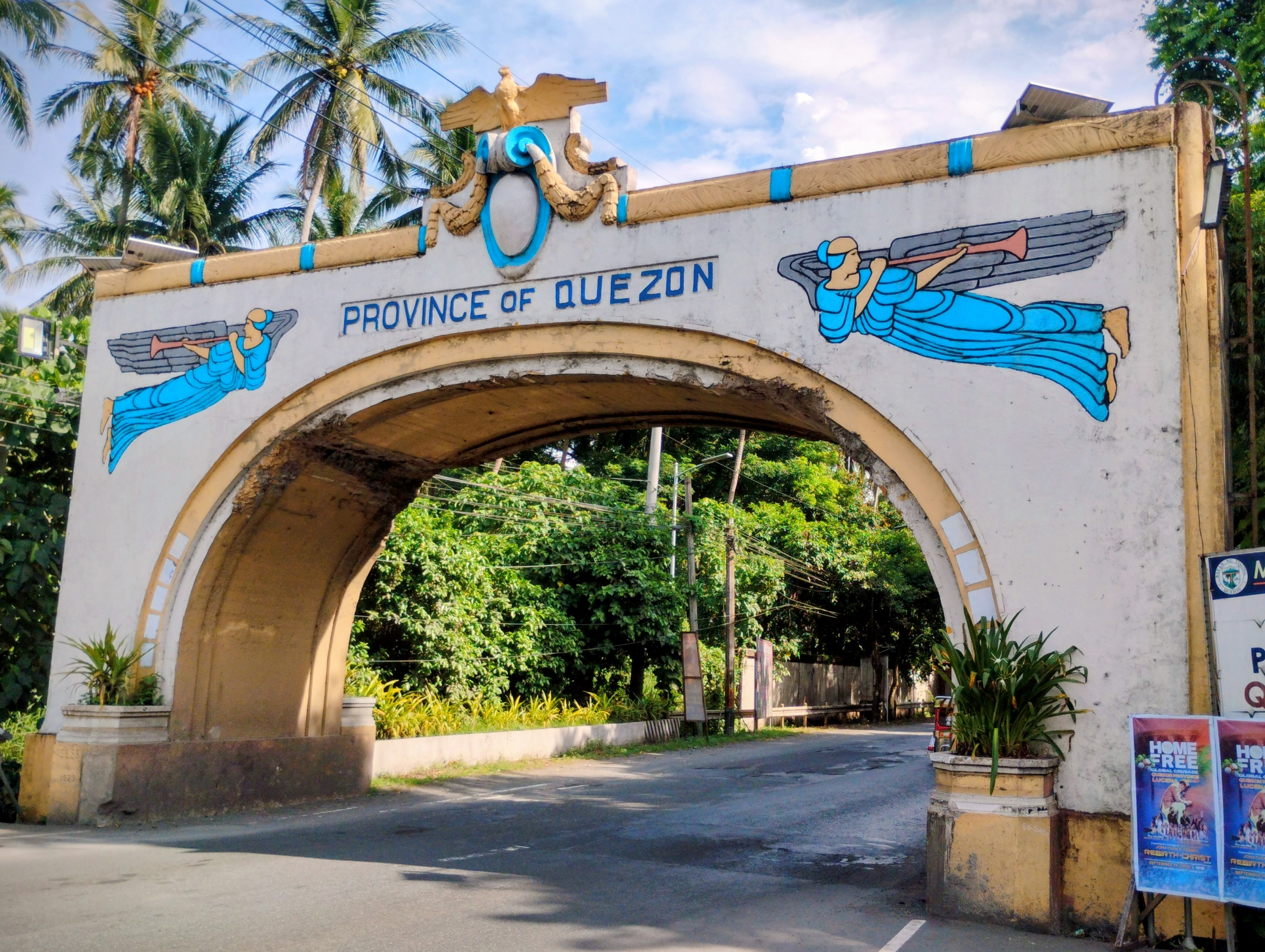
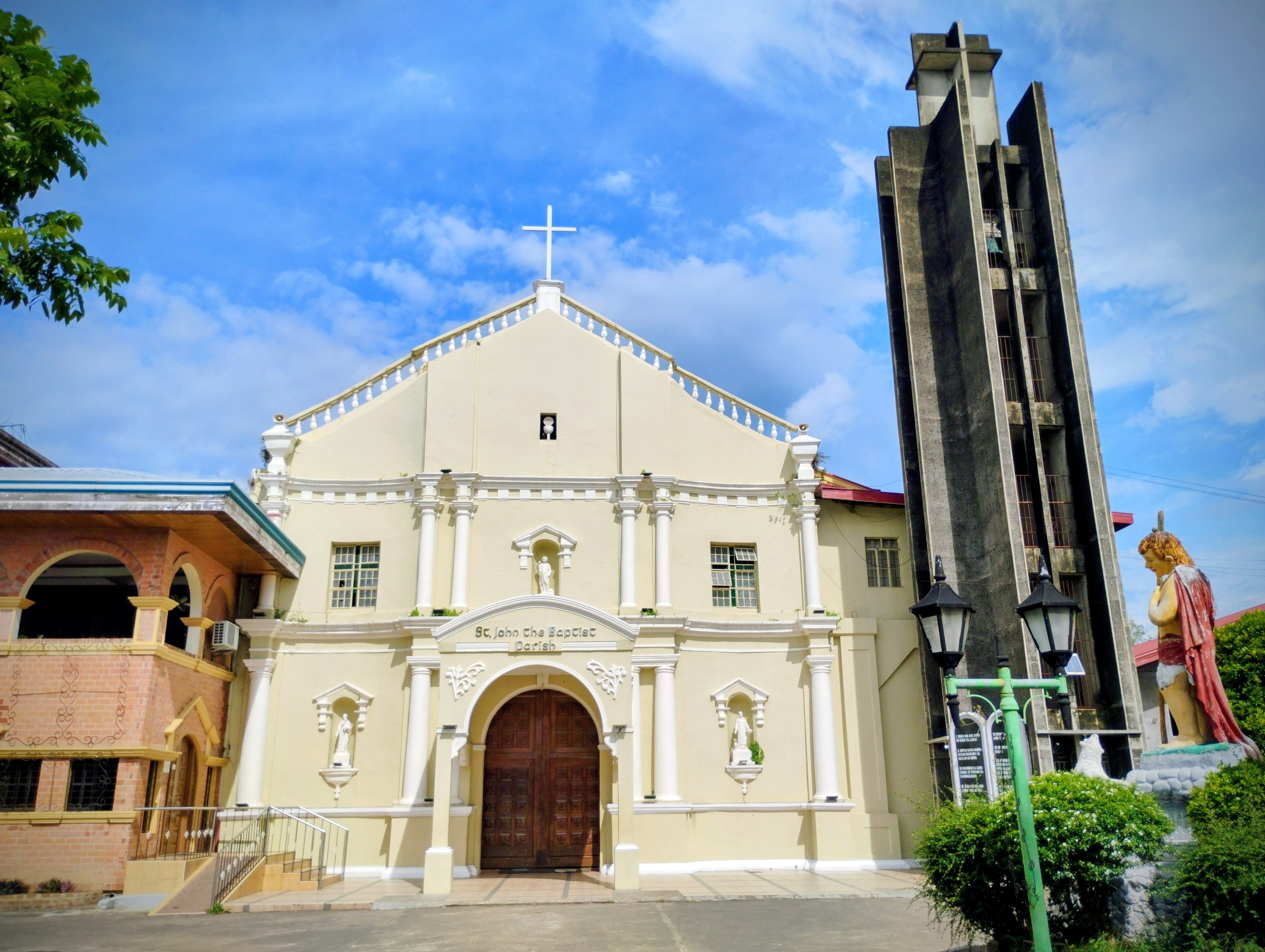
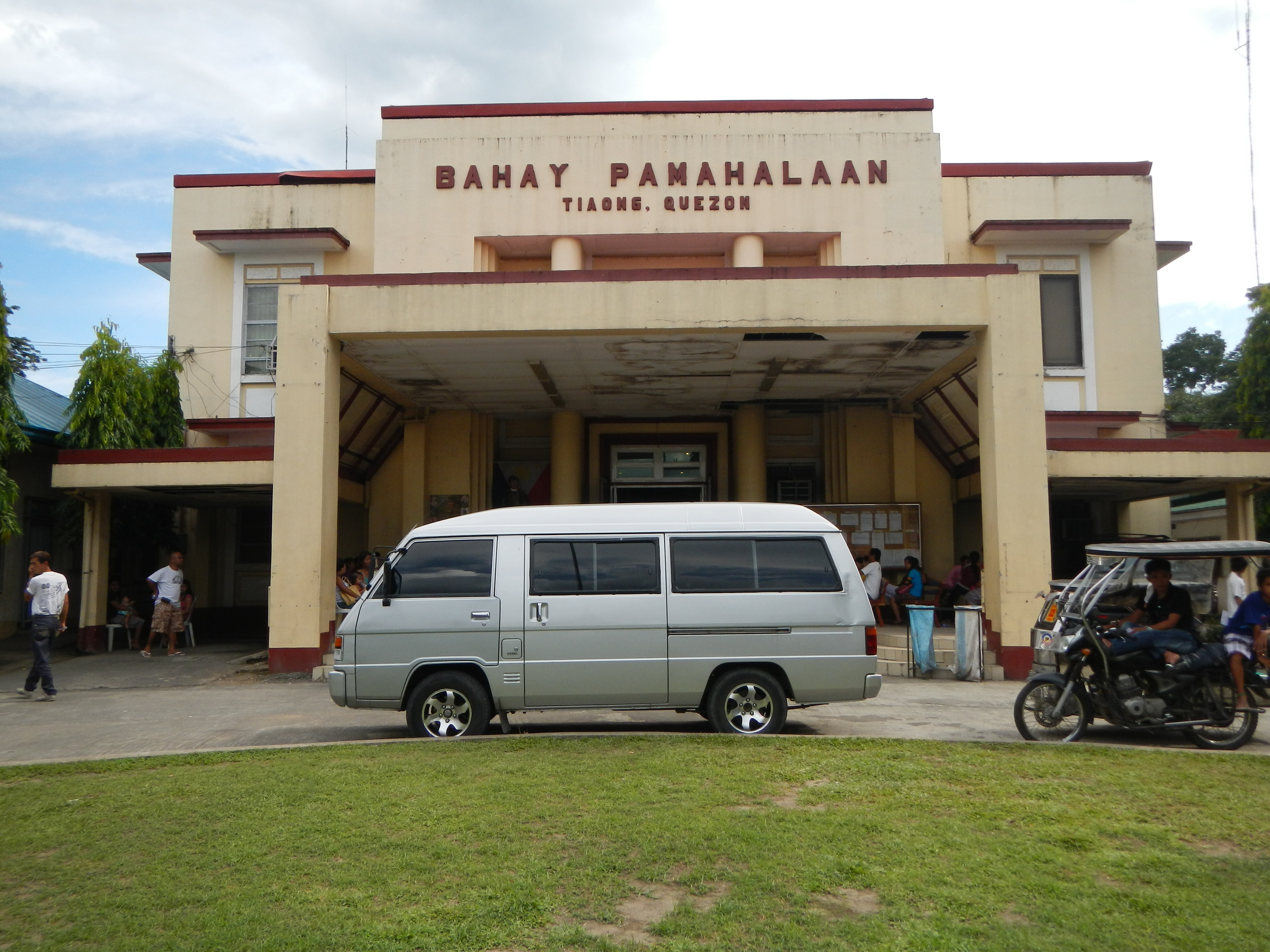
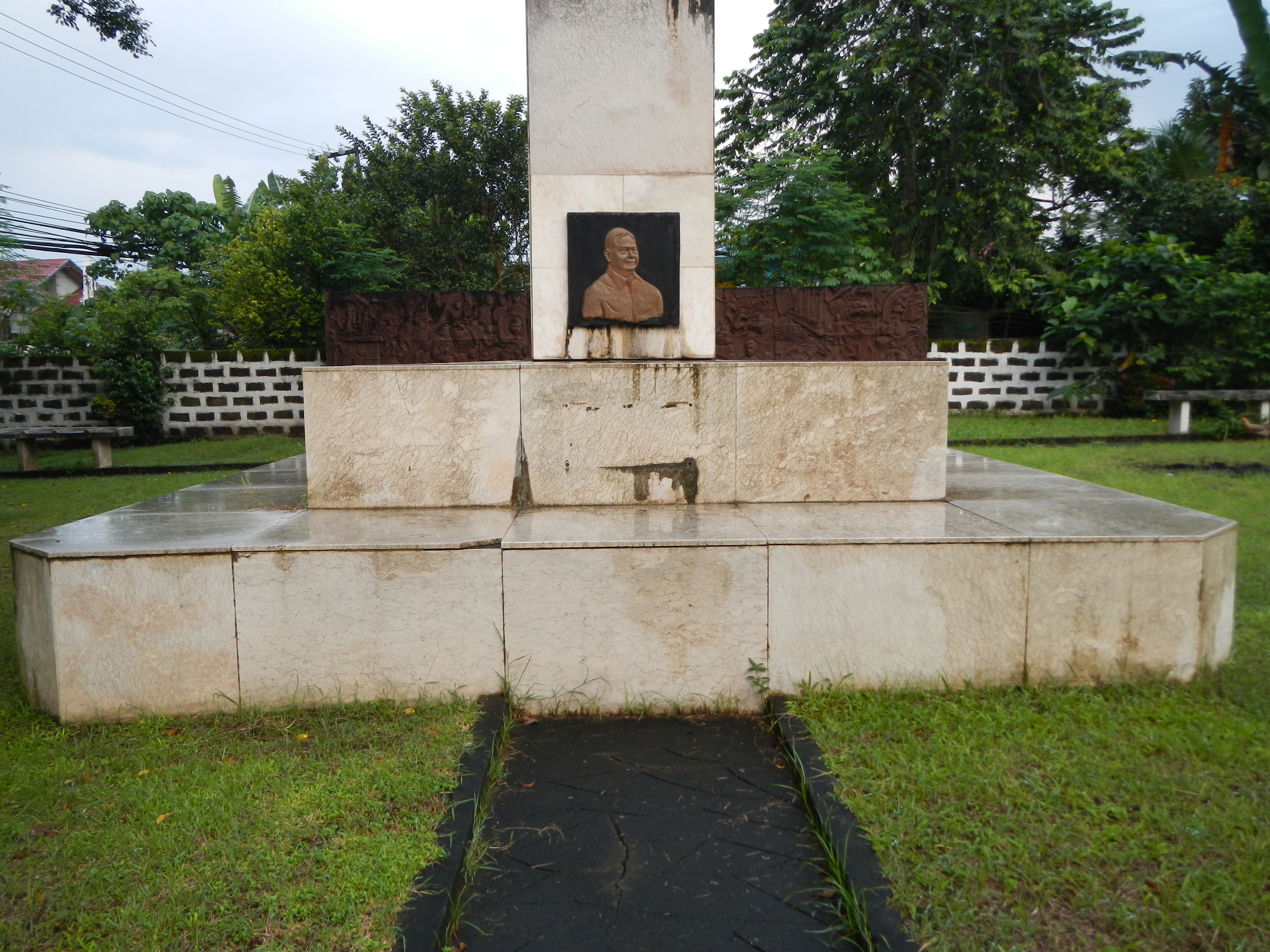
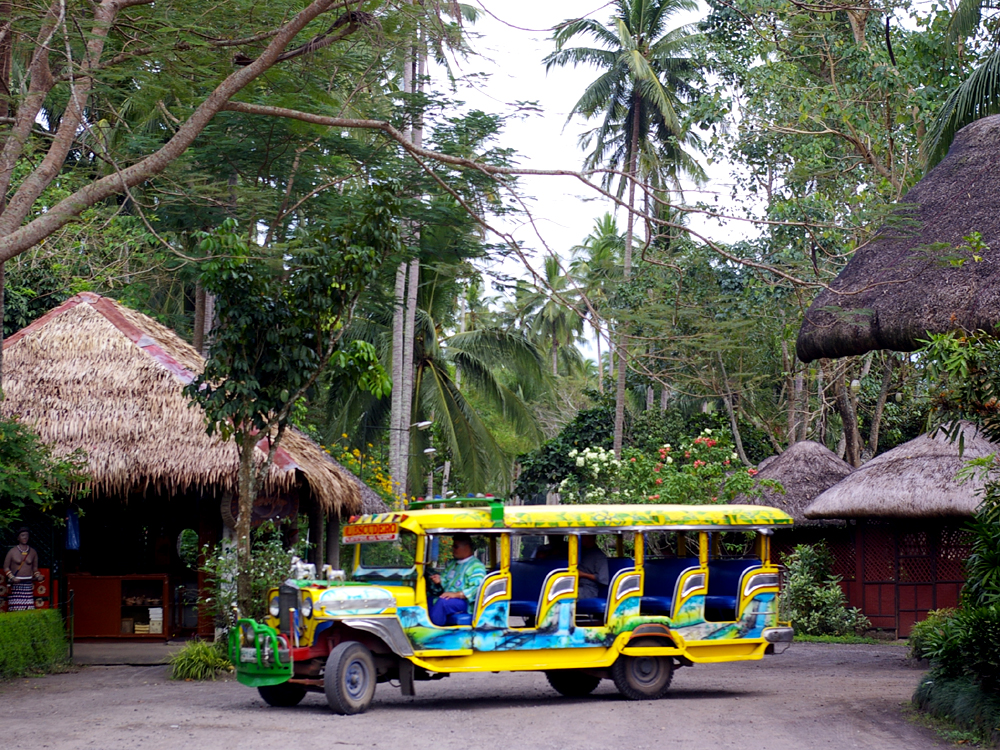
- From top, left to right: Quezon-Laguna Boundary Arch, Saint John the Baptist Parish Church, Municipal Hall, Claro M. Recto Memorial Shrine, Villa Escudero

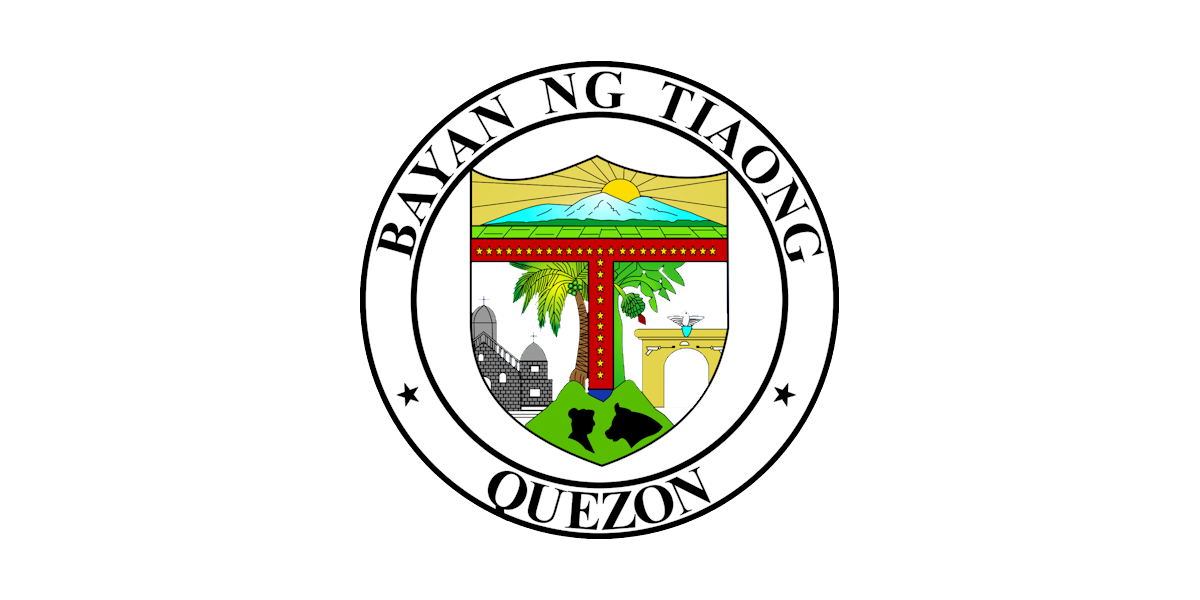
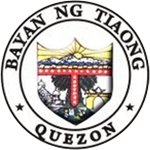
- Flag Seal
- Nicknames: "Home of the Legendary Lake Ticob"; "Gateway to Quezon Province"
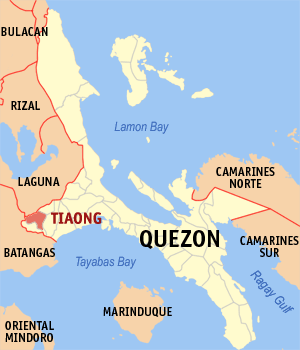
- Map of Quezon with Tiaong highlighted
- Interactive map of Tiaong
- Location within the Philippines
- Coordinates: 13°57′N 121°19′E
- Country: Philippines
- Region: Calabarzon
- Province: Quezon
- District: 2nd district
- Founded: May 12, 1691
- Barangays: 31 (see Barangays)

Government
  - Type: Sangguniang Bayan
  - Mayor: Vincent Arjay M. Mea
  - Vice Mayor: Roderick A. Umali
  - Representative: David C. Suarez
  - Municipal Council: Members: Ma. Maja Alexandra E. Landicho; Romano P. Castillo Jr.; Eugene P. Lopez; Elton Rex B. Baldeo; Rex D. Bautista; Jessa L. Preza; Jonas Bryson R. Atienza; Tomas P. Ilao
  - Electorate: 73,299 voters (2025)

Area
  - Total: 168.38 km^{2} (65.01 sq mi)
- Elevation: 94 m (308 ft)
- Highest elevation: 849 m (2,785 ft)
- Lowest elevation: 11 m (36 ft)

Population (2024 census)
  - Total: 107,666
  - Density: 639.42/km^{2} (1,656.1/sq mi)
  - Households: 26,509
- Demonym: Tiaongin

Economy
  - Income class: 1st municipal income class
  - Poverty incidence: 4.01% (2023)
  - Revenue: ₱ 433 million (2024)
  - Assets: ₱ 1,758 million (2024)
  - Expenditure: ₱ 206.3 million (2024)
  - Liabilities: ₱ 332.5 million (2024)

Service provider
  - Electricity: Manila Electric Company (Meralco)
- Time zone: UTC+8 (PST)
- ZIP code: 4325
- PSGC: 0405648000
- IDD : area code: +63 (0)42
- Native languages: Tagalog
- Website: tiaong.gov.ph

Tiaong ([ˈtjaʔɔŋ]), officially the Municipality of Tiaong (Tagalog: Bayan ng Tiaong), is a municipality in the province of Quezon, Philippines. According to the 2024 census, it has a population of 107,666 people.

== Etymology ==
The town got its name from tiaong, the Tagalog local name of Rubroshorea ovata, a native species of hardwood tree.

== History ==
Historically, Dolores was once consolidated with the municipality of Tiaong by virtue of Act No. 402 dated May 17, 1902.

On June 21, 1957, barrios Matipunso, Behia, and Bucal were established out of barrios Niing, Callejon, and Buha, respectively. On October 4, 1957, barrios Buliran, Callejon, Niing, and Pury were excised from Tiaong to form the new municipality of San Antonio.

== Geography ==
Tiaong is 35 kilometers (22 mi) from Lucena and 95 kilometers (59 mi) from Manila.

=== Barangays ===
Tiaong is politically subdivided into 31 barangays, as indicated below. Each barangay consists of puroks and some have sitios.

- Anastacia
- Aquino
- Ayusan I
- Ayusan II
- Behia
- Bukal
- Bula
- Bulakin
- Cabatang
- Cabay
- Del Rosario
- Lagalag
- Lalig
- Lumingon
- Lusacan
- Paiisa
- Palagaran
- Poblacion I
- Poblacion II
- Poblacion III
- Poblacion IV
- Quipot
- San Agustin
- San Isidro
- San Jose
- San Juan
- San Pedro
- Tagbakin
- Talisay
- Tamisian
- San Francisco

=== Climate ===
Climate data for Tiaong, Quezon
Month	Jan	Feb	Mar	Apr	May	Jun	Jul	Aug	Sep	Oct	Nov	Dec	Year
Mean daily maximum °C (°F)	27 (81)	28 (82)	30 (86)	32 (90)	31 (88)	30 (86)	29 (84)	29 (84)	29 (84)	29 (84)	28 (82)	27 (81)	29 (84)
Mean daily minimum °C (°F)	20 (68)	20 (68)	21 (70)	22 (72)	24 (75)	24 (75)	24 (75)	24 (75)	24 (75)	23 (73)	22 (72)	21 (70)	22 (72)
Average precipitation mm (inches)	52 (2.0)	35 (1.4)	27 (1.1)	27 (1.1)	82 (3.2)	124 (4.9)	163 (6.4)	144 (5.7)	145 (5.7)	141 (5.6)	100 (3.9)	102 (4.0)	1,142 (45)
Average rainy days	12.0	8.1	8.8	9.7	17.9	22.6	26.2	24.5	24.6	22.0	16.7	14.9	208
Source: Meteoblue

== Demographics ==
Population census of Tiaong
Year	Pop.	±% p.a.
1903	9,527	—
1918	14,211	+2.70%
1939	27,179	+3.14%
1948	26,454	−0.30%
1960	26,084	−0.12%
1970	38,725	+4.03%
1975	43,245	+2.24%
1980	48,606	+2.36%
1990	60,662	+2.24%
1995	67,403	+1.99%
2000	75,498	+2.46%
2007	87,707	+2.09%
2010	91,599	+1.59%
2015	99,712	+1.63%
2020	106,265	+1.35%
2024	107,666	+0.31%
Source: Philippine Statistics Authority

== Economy ==
Poverty incidence of Tiaong (%)

Source: Philippine Statistics Authority

== Government ==
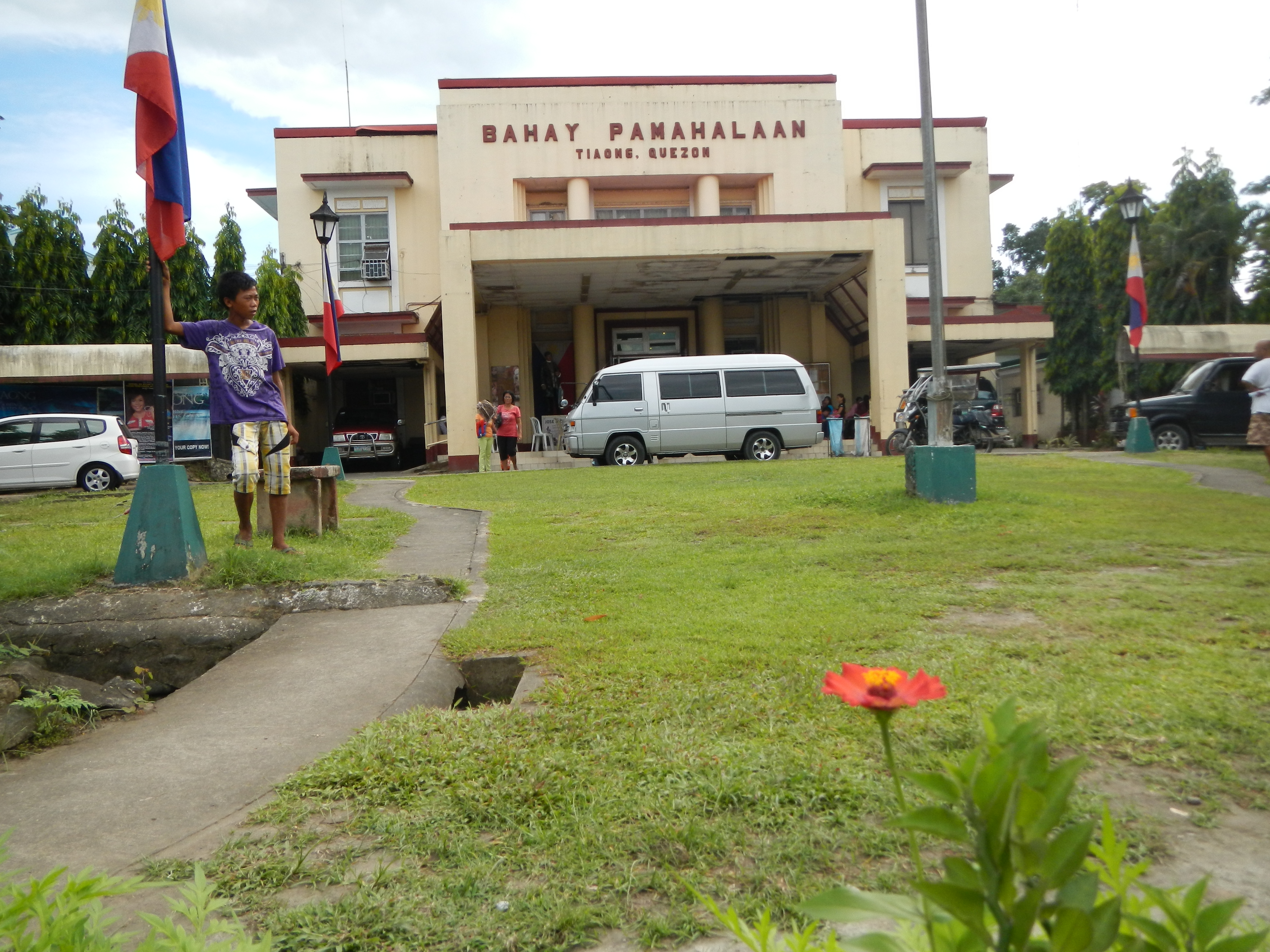
Town hall

=== Elected officials ===
Municipal officials of Tiaong (2022-2025)
Position	Name of official
Municipal Mayor	Vincent Arjay M. Mea
Municipal Vice Mayor	Roderick A. Umali
Municipal Councilors	Ma. Maja Alexandra E. Landicho
Municipal Councilors	Romano P. Castillo Jr.
Municipal Councilors	Eugene P. Lopez
Municipal Councilors	Elton Rex B. Baldeo
Municipal Councilors	Rex D. Bautista
Municipal Councilors	Jessa L. Preza
Municipal Councilors	Jonas Bryson R. Atienza
Municipal Councilors	Tomas P. Ilao

== Tourism ==
- Moises Amat Escueta Ala-ala Park
- Saint John the Baptist Parish Church of Tiaong
- Villa Escudero

== Education ==
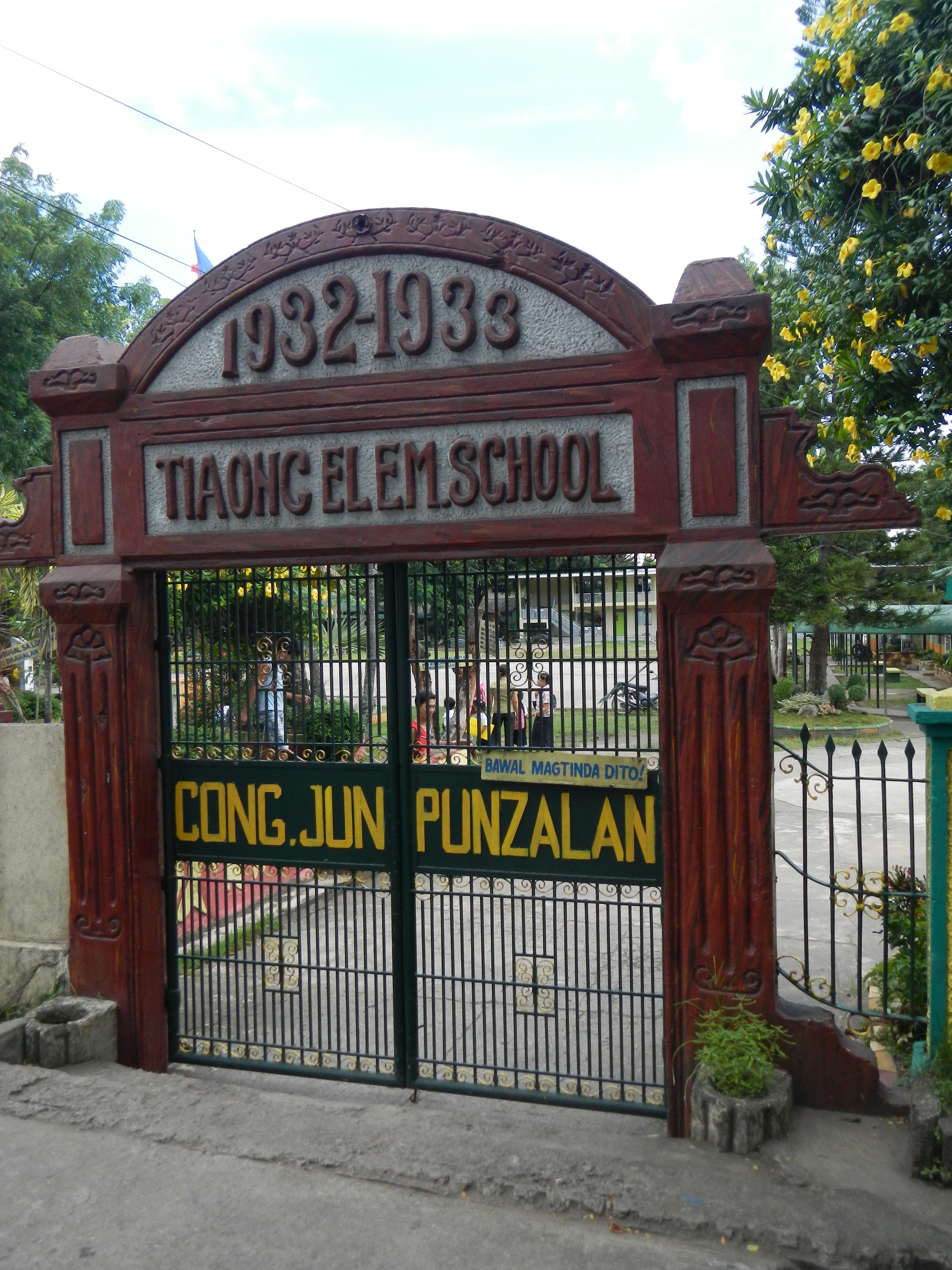
Tiaong Elementary School

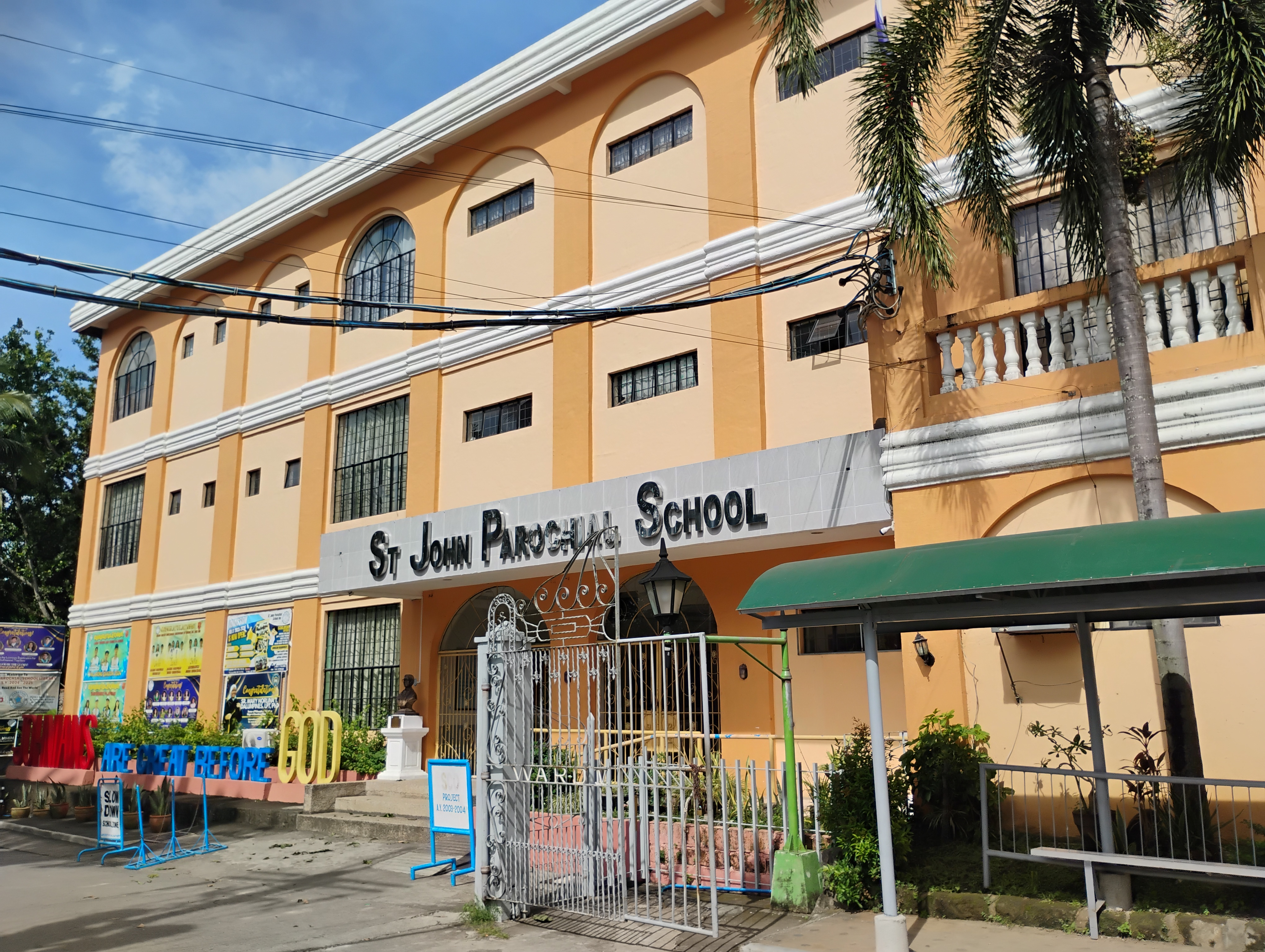
Saint John Parochial School

The Tiaong Schools District Office governs all educational institutions within the municipality. It oversees the management and operations of all private and public, from primary to secondary schools.

=== Primary and elementary schools ===
- Anastacia Elementary School
- Aquino Elementary School
- Ayusan Elementary School
- Behia Elementary School
- Bukal Elementary School
- Bula Elementary School
- Bulakin Elementary School
- Cabatang Elementary School
- Cabay Elementary School
- Claro M. Recto Memorial Central School
- Del Rosario Elementary School
- Doña Concepcion H.
- Gaudete Study Center Inc.
- Geriane Rainbow School
- Hilirang Buli Elementary School
- Kiddie Corner School Inc.
- Lagalag Elementary School
- Lusacan Elementary School
- Luzon Field Academy
- Maranatha Christian Academy
- Palagaran Elementary School
- Saint John Parochial School
- San Francisco Elementary School
- San Isidro Elementary School
- San Jose Elementary School
- San Pedro Elementary School
- Southside Integrated School
- Tagbakin Elementary School
- Tiaong Christian Academy
- Tiaong East Elementary School
- Umali Elementary School

=== Secondary schools ===
- Cabay National High School
- Don Ysidro Memorial School
- Gaudete Study Center Inc.
- Gloria Umali National High School
- Lalig National High School
- Lusacan National High School
- Lusacan Senior High School
- Paiisa National High School
- Recto Memorial National High School
- St. John Parochial School
- Talisay Integrated School

=== Higher educational institutions ===
- Asian Institute of Technology & Education
- Lyceum De San Pablo
- Olinsterg College
- Southern Luzon State University

== Gallery ==
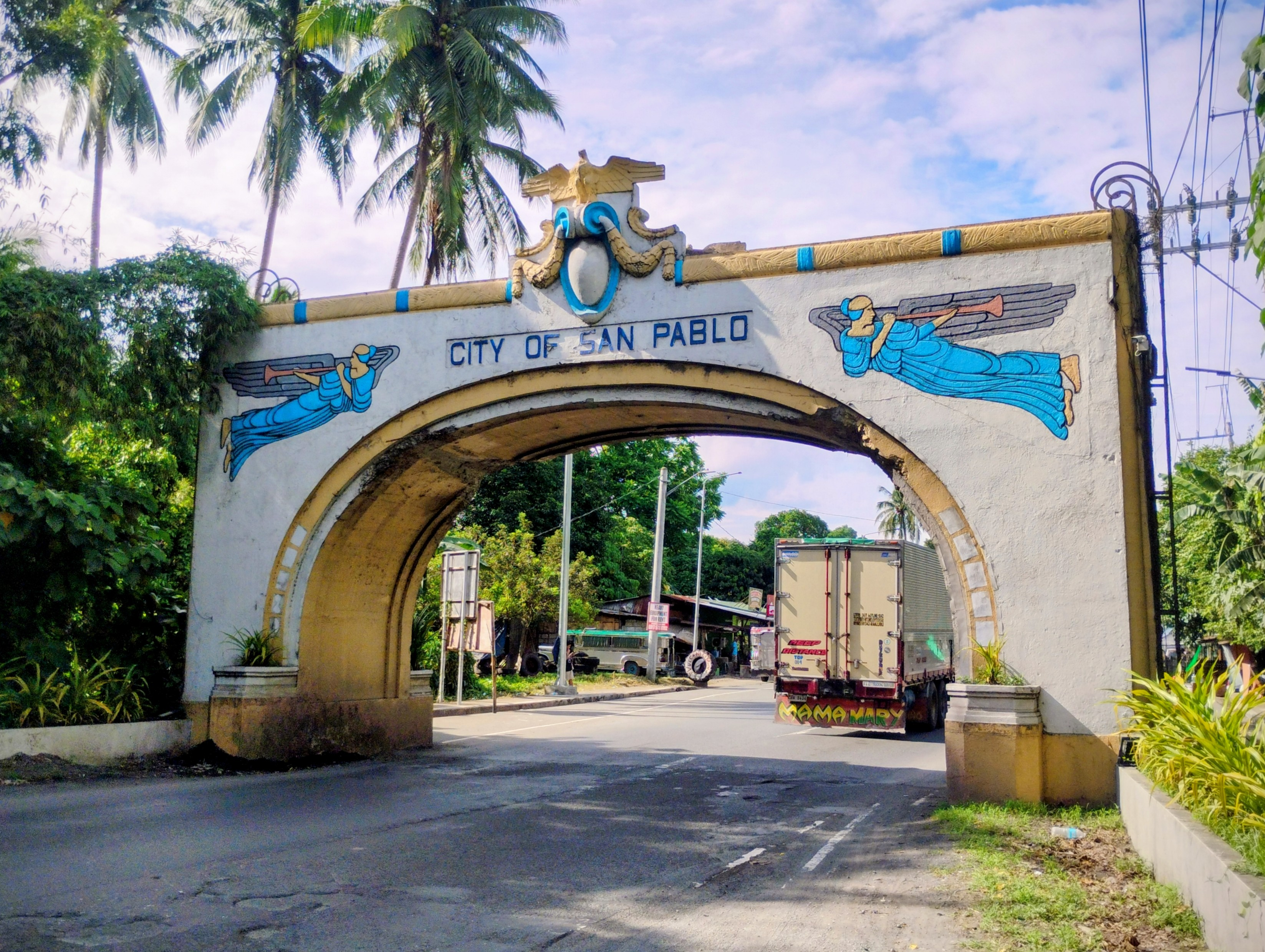
Boundary Arch of Quezon

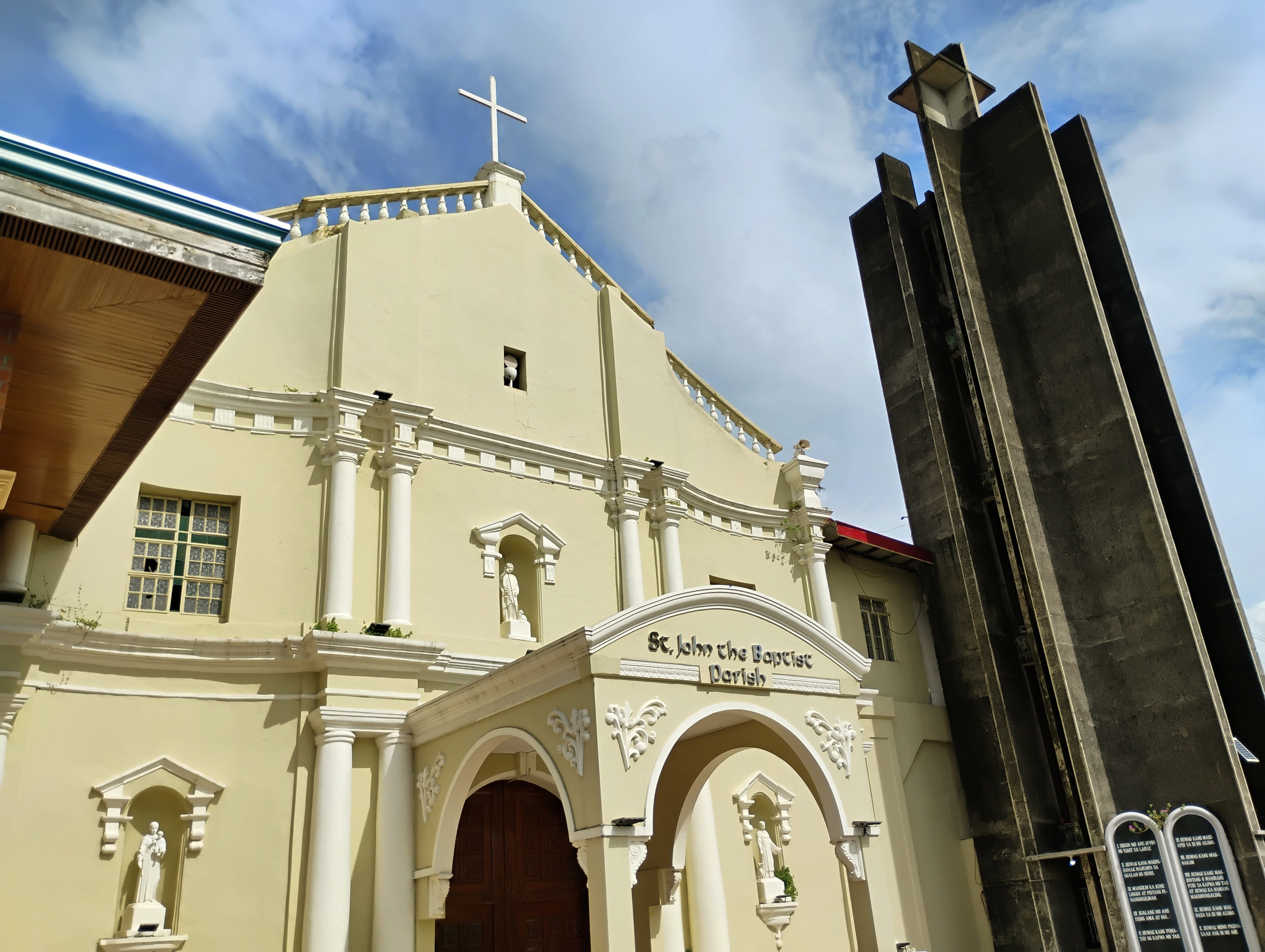
Saint John the Baptist Parish Church of Tiaong

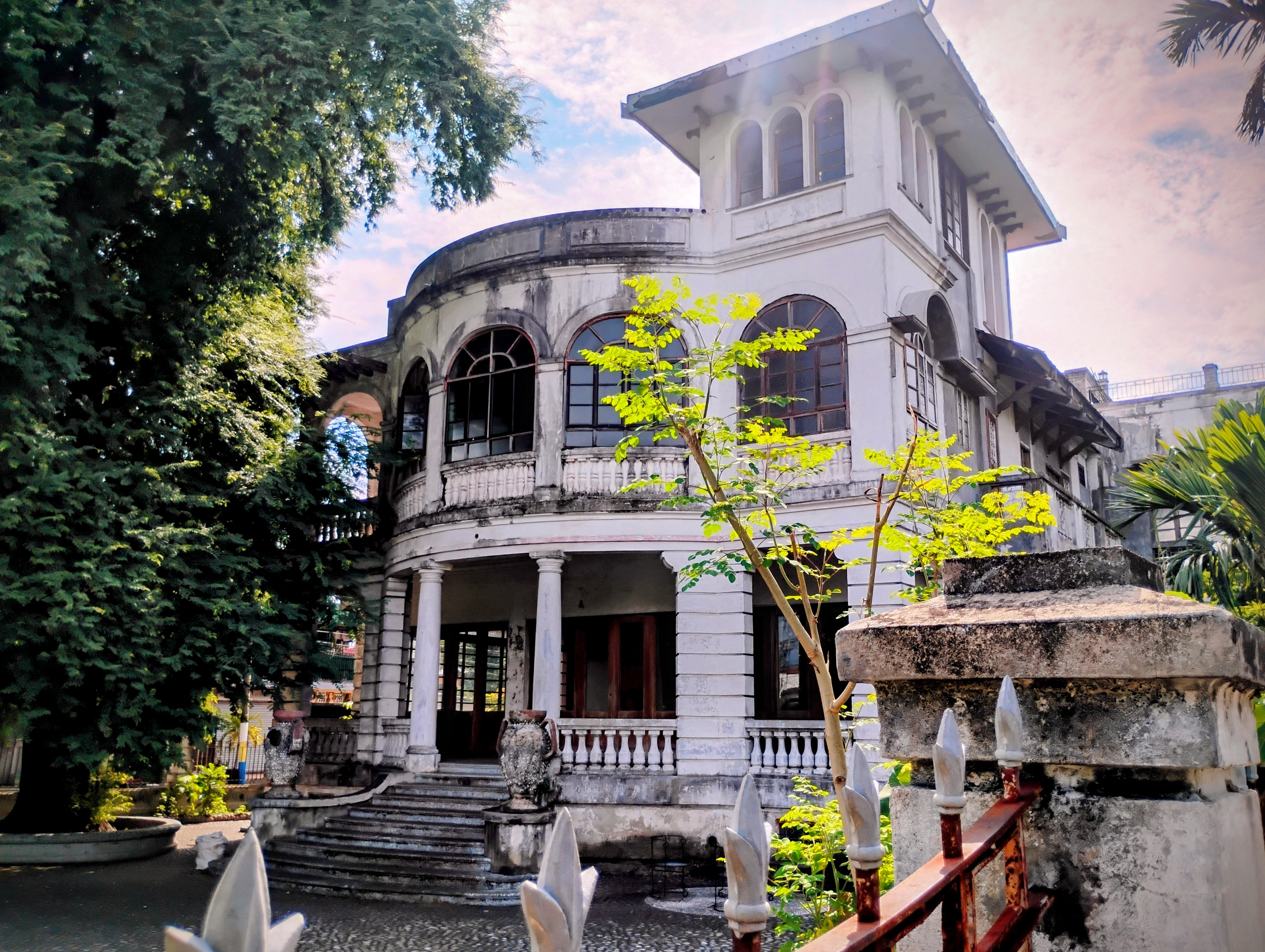
Doña Concha Umali Ancestral House

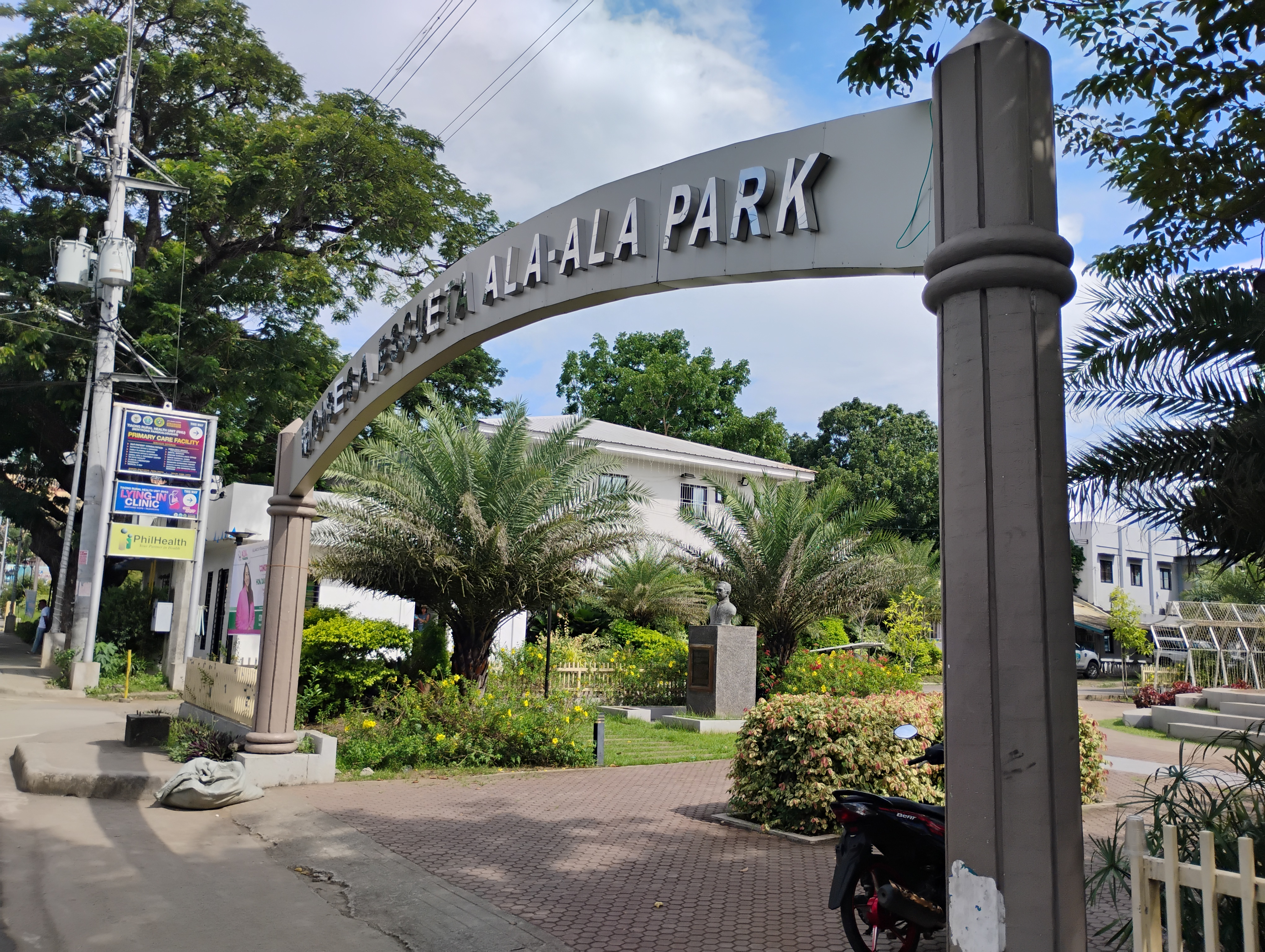
Moises Amat Escueta Ala-ala Park

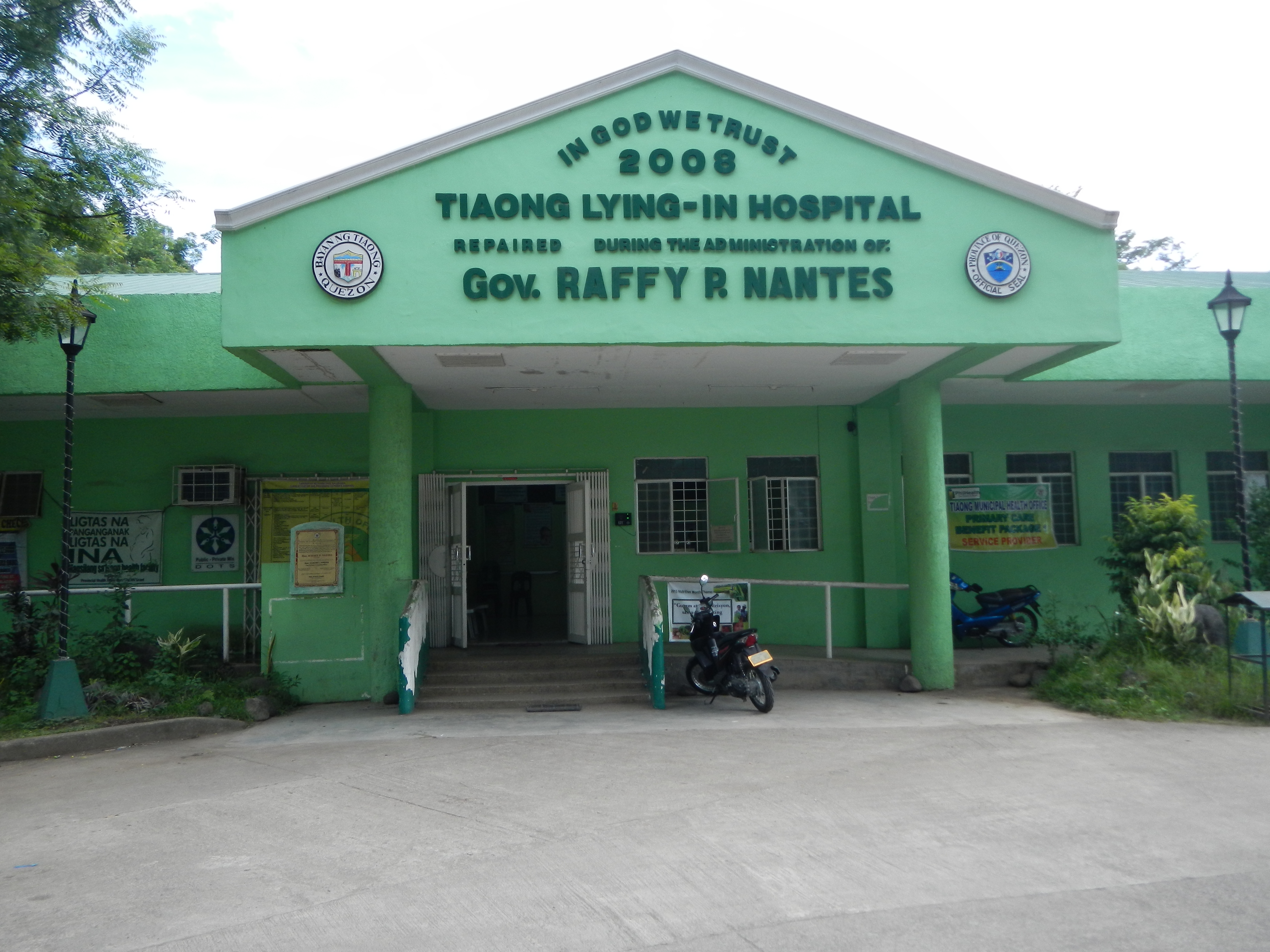
Tiaong Lying-In Hospital

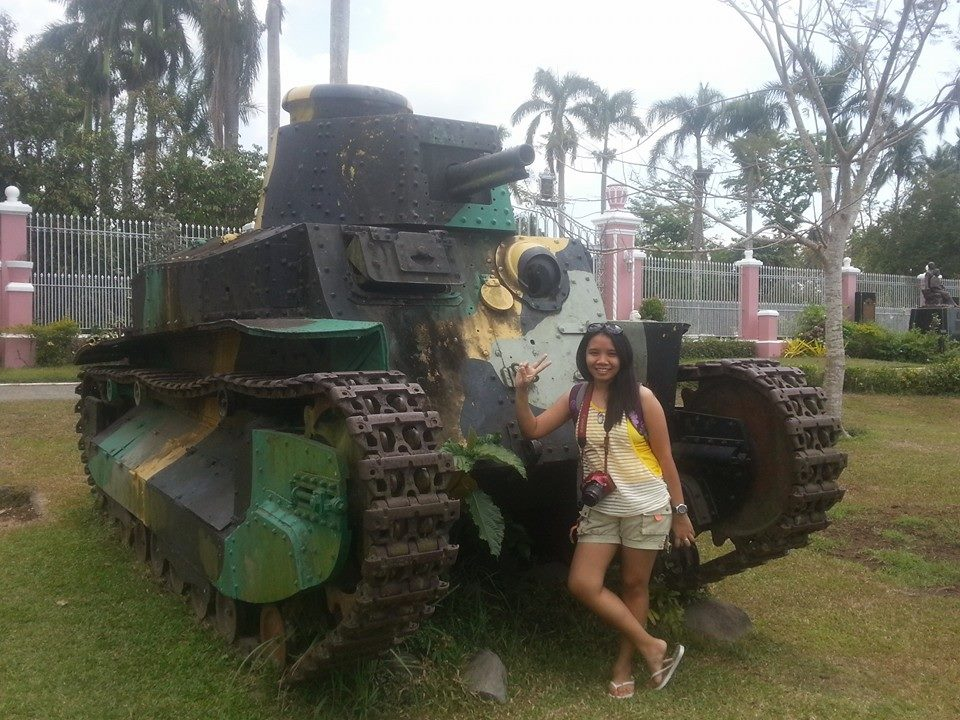
Type 89 I-Go tank at Villa Escudero

== Notable persons ==
- Anna Suarez (born 1980), politician and former congresswoman
- Claro M. Recto (1890-1960), Senator and Supreme Court Justice
- Ye Fei (1914-1999), Chinese general and politician
