= List of Japanese armoured fighting vehicles of World War II =

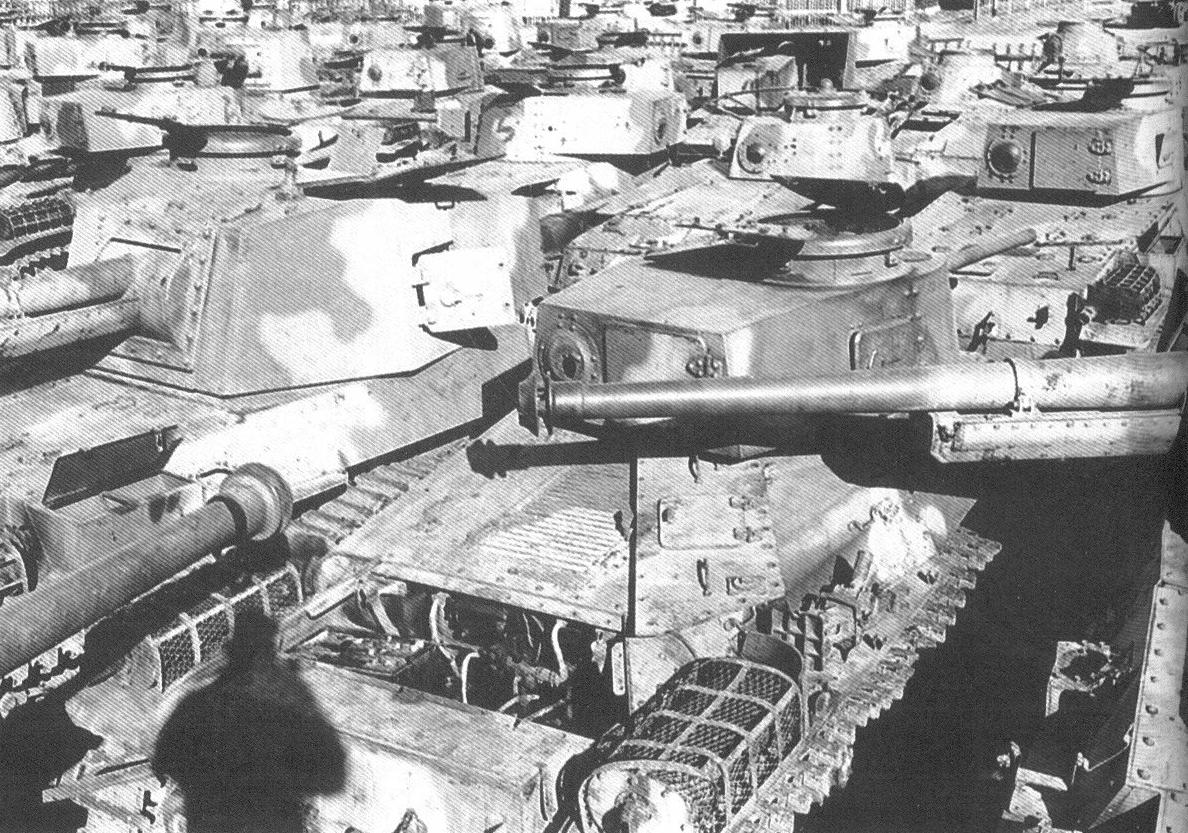
Depot for IJA 4th Tank Division with Type 1 Chi-He and Type 3 Chi-Nu tanks, 1945

== Japanese tanks and armoured vehicles ==
This is a list of the Japanese armoured fighting vehicles of World War II. This list includes vehicles that never left the drawing board; prototype models and production models from after World War I, into the interwar period and through the end of the Second World War.

=== Tankettes ===
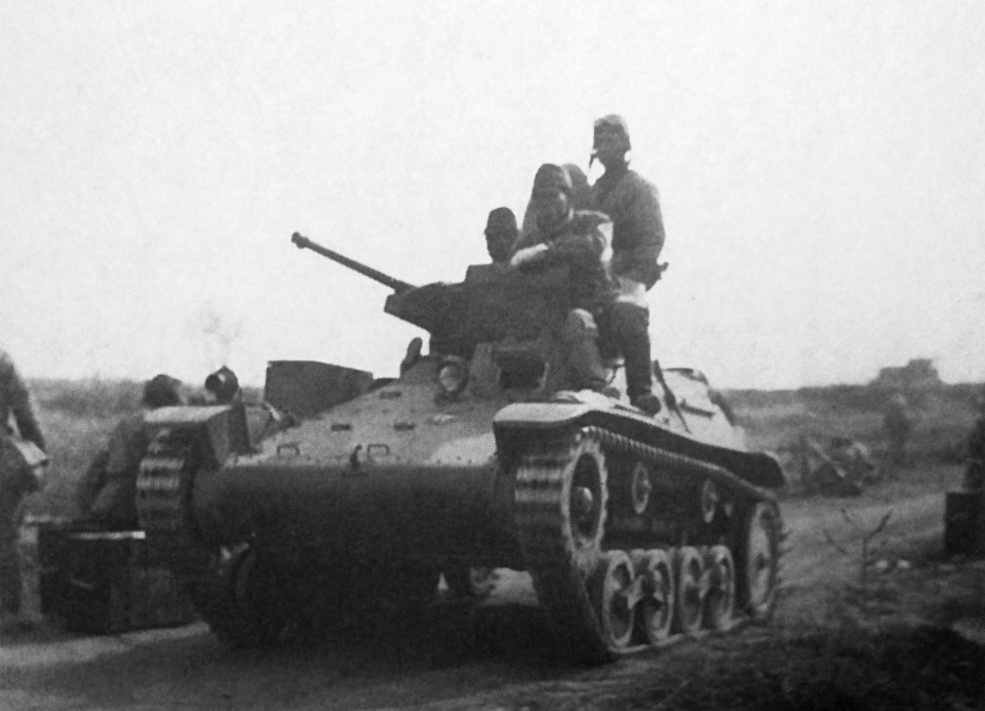
Type 97 Te-Ke tankette in China

- Type 92 Jyu-Sokosha (Type 92 cavalry tank)
- Type 94 tankette
- Type 97 Te-Ke tankette

=== Light tanks ===
- Type 95 Ha-Go light tank
- Type 98 Ke-Ni light tank
- Type 2 Ke-To light tank
- Type 4 Ke-Nu light tank

=== Medium tanks ===
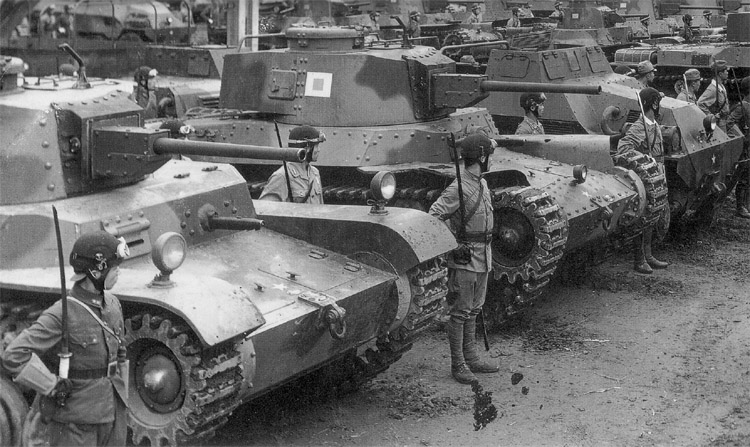
Photo of Type 1 Chi-He on left and Type 97 Shinhoto Chi-Ha on right

- Type 89 I-Go medium tank (Chi-Ro)
- Type 97 Chi-Ha medium tank
  - Shi-Ki command tank
- Type 97 Shinhoto Chi-Ha improved medium tank
- Type 1 Chi-He medium tank
  - Ka-So command tank
- Type 3 Chi-Nu medium tank
- Type 4 Chi-To medium tank
- Type 5 Chi-Ri medium tank (prototype)

=== Heavy tanks ===
- Type 95 heavy tank
- O-I super-heavy tank (incomplete prototype)

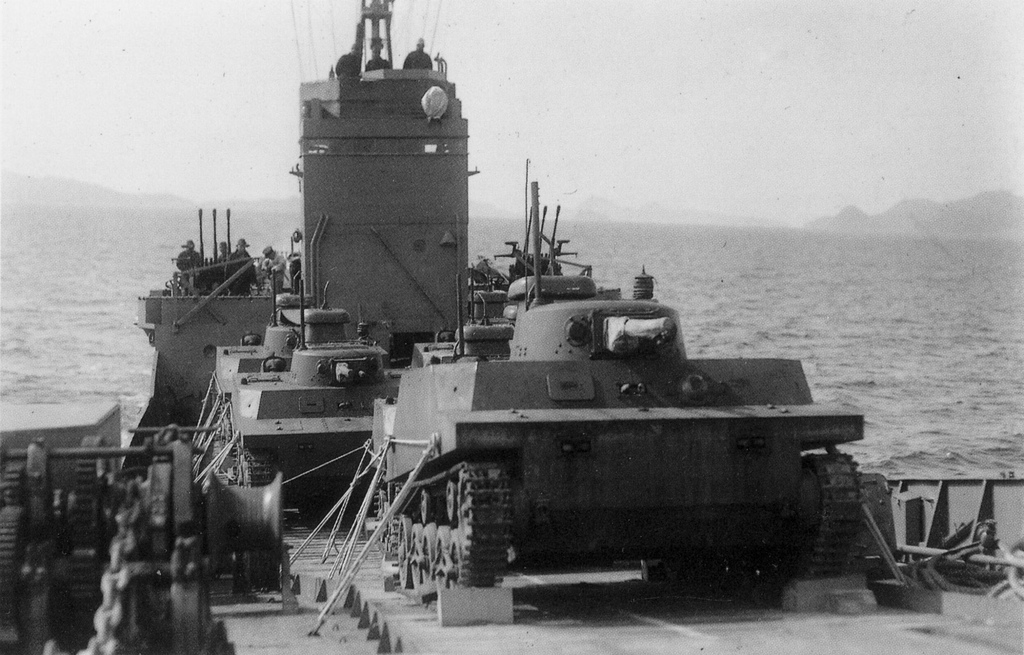
Type 2 Ka-Mi tanks on an IJN 2nd class transporter

=== Amphibious tanks ===
- SR I-Go amphibious tank (prototype)
- SR II Ro-Go amphibious tank (prototype)
- SR III Ha-Go amphibious tank (prototype)
- Type 1 Mi-Sha amphibious tank (prototype)
- Type 2 Ka-Mi amphibious tank
- Type 3 Ka-Chi amphibious tank
- Type 5 To-Ku amphibious tank (prototype)

=== Self-propelled guns ===
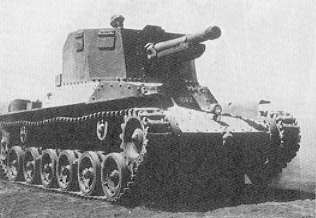
Type 1 Ho-Ni II

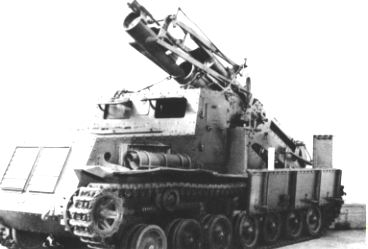
Type 4 Ha-To

- Type 1 Ho-Ni I 75 mm tank destroyer
- Type 1 Ho-Ni II 105 mm SPH
- Type 2 Ho-I gun tank
- Type 3 Ho-Ni III gun tank
- Type 4 Ho-Ro 150 mm SPH
- Type 4 Ha-To 30 cm SP heavy mortar carrier
- Type 97 Short barrel 120 mm gun tank
- Type 5 Na-To 75 mm SP anti-tank gun

=== Experimental tanks & self-propelled guns ===
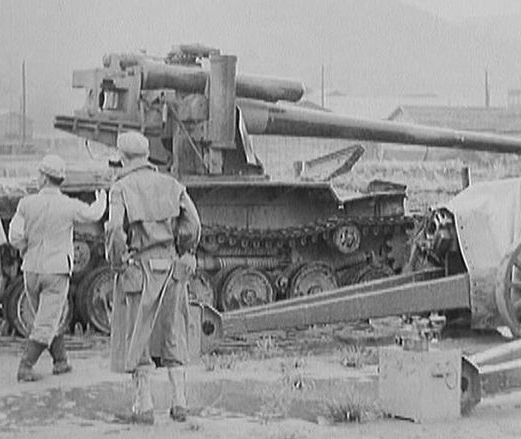
Experimental IJN Long barrel 120 mm SPG being demonstrated to US Army personnel, post-surrender

- Experimental tank Number 1 a/k/a Type 87 Chi-I medium tank
- Experimental Type 91 heavy tank
- Experimental medium tank Chi-Ni
- Experimental medium tank Type 98 Chi-Ho
- Experimental Type 97 Ki-To SPAAG 20 mm anti-aircraft tank
- Experimental Type 98 Ta-Se 20 mm anti-aircraft tank
- Experimental Type 98 20 mm AAG tank with a twin Type 2 20 mm AA machine cannon
- Experimental Type 1 Ho-I infantry support gun tank
- Experimental light tank Type 3 Ke-Ri
- Experimental flying tank Ku-Ro (only a prototype mock-up was completed)
- Experimental Type 97 Chi-Yu mine flail tank
- Experimental Type 97 mine clearing tank GS
- Experimental Type 97 flamethrower tank (two different versions)
- Experimental Type 2 Ku-Se 75 mm SP gun
- Experimental Type 4 Ho-To 120 mm self-propelled howitzer
- Experimental Type 5 Ho-Ru 47 mm SP gun (similar to the German Hetzer)
- Experimental light tank Type 5 Ke-Ho
- Experimental Hi-Ro Sha 10 cm SP gun
- Experimental Ji-Ro 10 cm SP gun
- Experimental Long barrel 120 mm SP gun
- Experimental anti-aircraft tank Ta-Ha (incomplete prototype)
- Experimental Ka-To SP gun 105 mm tank destroyer (development stage unknown)
- Type 5 Ho-Ri 105 mm SP gun tank (similar to the German Ferdinand/Elefant, only the main gun and a prototype mock-up was completed)
- Type 5 Ho-Ri II 105 mm SP gun tank (similar to the German Jagdtiger, only a design study was completed)
- Experimental Type 5 155 mm Ho-Chi SP gun

=== Armored vehicles ===
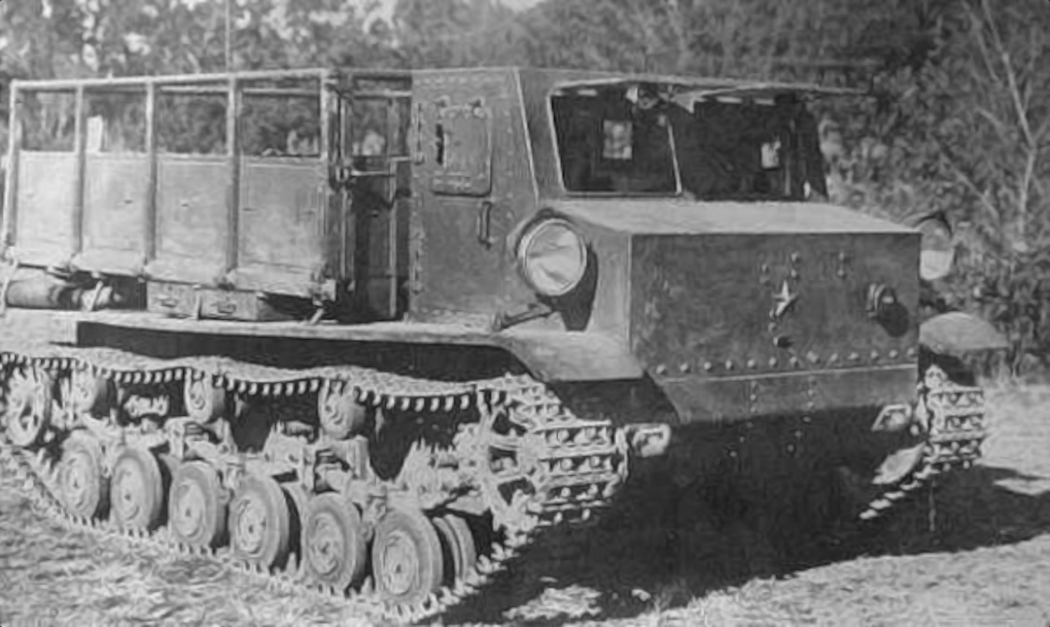
Front angle view of Type TC experimental armored personnel carrier

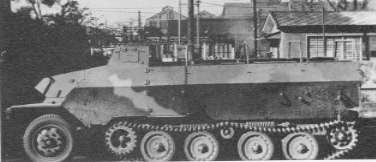
Side view of Type 1 Ho-Ha armored half-track

- Sumida amphibious armored car (experimental)
- Austin-type Chiyoda armoured car
- Type 2592 Chiyoda armored car
- Sumida M.2593 a/k/a Type 91 So-Mo armored railroad car
  - Sumida Model P armored car
- Type 93 armoured car a/k/a Type 2593 Hokoku, Type 93 Kokusan or "Type 92" naval armored car
- Type 95 So-Ki armored railroad car
- Type 98 So-Da armored ammunition carrier
- Type 100 Te-Re observation vehicle
- Type 1 Ho-Ha half-track armored personnel carrier
- Type TC experimental armored personnel carrier
- Type TE experimental armored personnel carrier
- Type TG experimental armored personnel carrier
- Type 1 Ho-Ki armored personnel carrier
- Type 4 Chi-So armored tracked carrier
- Type 4 Ka-Tsu amphibious armored launch/personnel carrier

=== Other vehicles ===
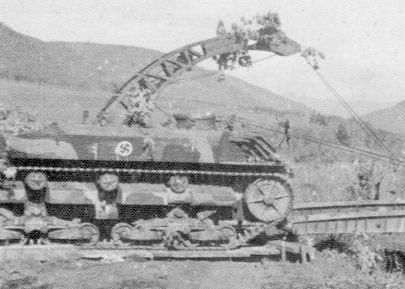
SS-Ki of the 5th Independent Engineer Regiment using its crane

- Armored engineer vehicle SS-Ki
- Armored lumberjack Ho-K
- Lumber sweeper Basso-Ki
- Armored recovery vehicle Se-Ri
- S B tracked swamp vehicle (prototype)
- F B tracked swamp vehicle
- T B tracked swamp scout vehicle
- Type 94 disinfecting vehicle and Type 94 gas scattering vehicle
- Type 97 "pole planter" and Type 97 "cable layer"
- Type 95 crane vehicle Ri-Ki
- Type 97 disinfecting vehicle and Type 97 gas scattering vehicle
- Type 97 mini engineer vehicle Yi-Go a/k/a Type 98 Ya-I Go
- Type 4 work vehicle
- Type 97 tank with detachable dozer blades, mostly for use in airfield construction
- Type T-G "bridge layer", utilized a Type 97 Chi-Ha tank chassis
- Experimental obstacle clearance vehicle, derived from the Type 97 tank
- Experimental charge layer vehicle, derived from the Type 97 tank
- Experimental trench excavator vehicle, derived from the Type 97 tank

== Imported tanks and armored vehicles (including captured types) ==
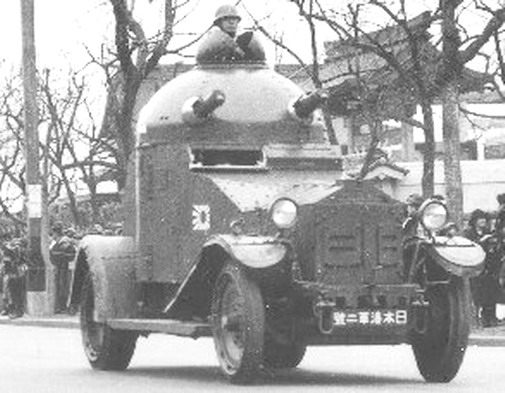
A IJN Vickers Crossley armoured car in Shanghai

- Austin armoured car
- Type Ka Kijusha a/k/a Type Ka machine gun car (Carden Loyd tankette)
- Vickers Crossley armoured car
- Wolseley armoured car
- British light tank Mk IV
- British medium Whippet Mk A
- Renault FT "Ko-Gata Sensha" light tank
- Renault NC27 "Otsu-Gata Sensha" light tank
- Carden-Loyd Mk.VI
- Stuart M3 light tank – captured
- British Universal carrier – captured
- Marmon-Herrington armoured car – captured

== See also ==
- List of armoured fighting vehicles used by the Imperial Japanese Army in the Second Sino-Japanese War
- List of Type 97 Chi-Ha variants
- Japanese tanks of World War II
