= List of Japanese Army military engineer vehicles of World War II =

This is a list of Japanese Army Military Engineer Vehicles during World War II. Included are diverse types of armored lumberjacks, mine clearing vehicles, engineering vehicles, construction and repair vehicles, recovery cranes and other materiel used by Imperial Japanese Army engineer units during World War II. A list of the engineer units is given, as well.

== Engineer vehicles ==
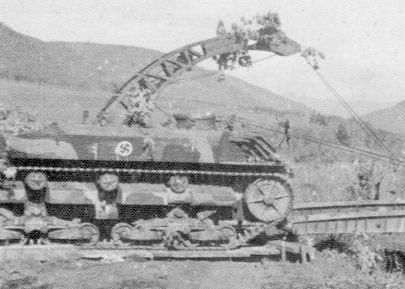
SS-Ki of the 5th Independent Engineer Regiment using its crane

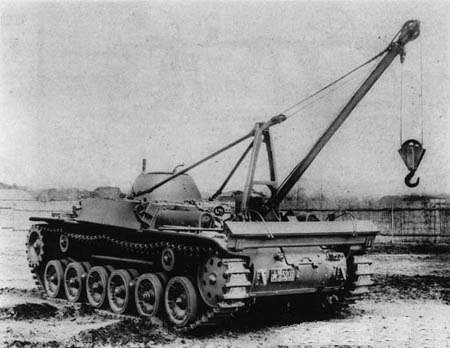
Armored recovery vehicle Se-Ri

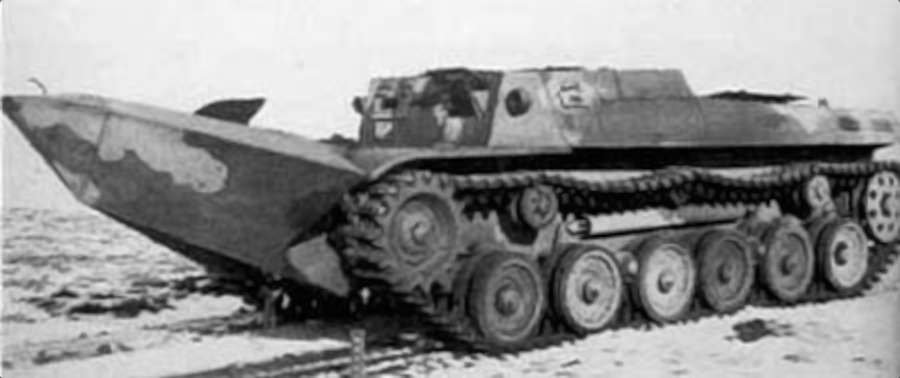
Armored lumberjack Ho-K

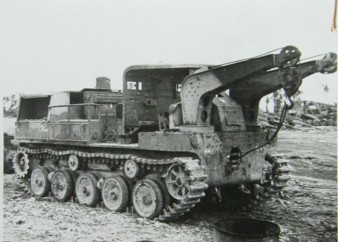
Basso-Ki, used to remove severed trees and stumps generated by the Ho-K

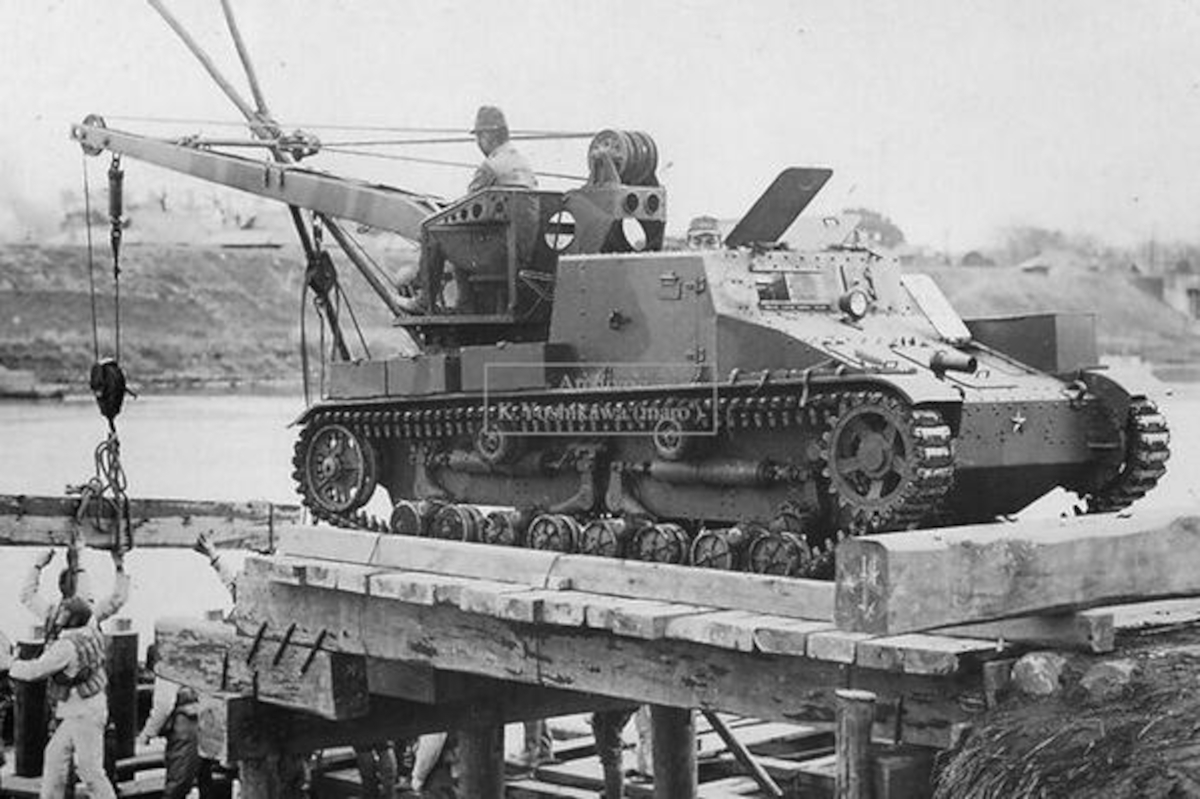
Type 95 crane vehicle Ri-Ki

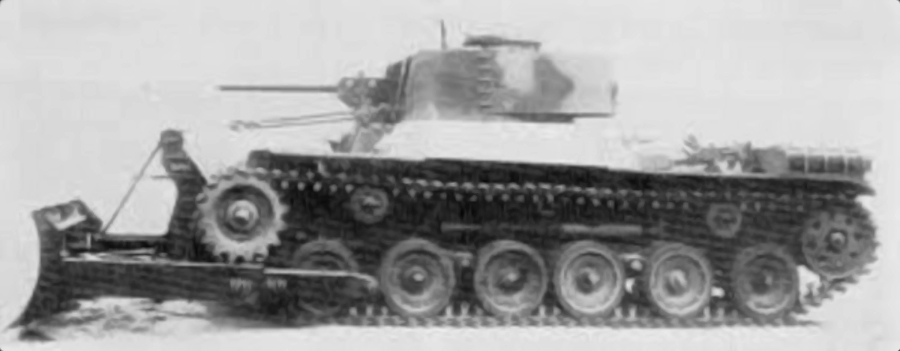
Type 97 Shinhōtō Chi-Ha with dozer blade

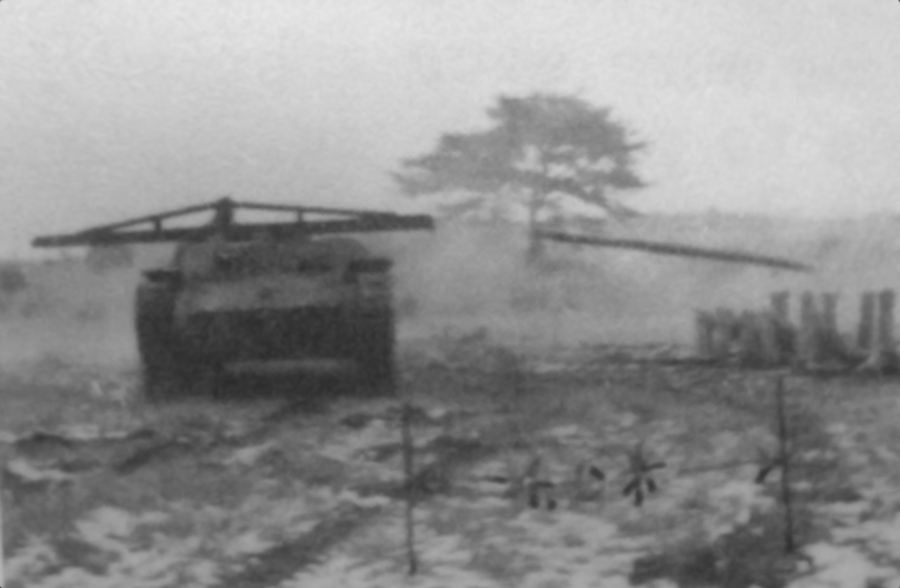
Experimental obstacle clearance vehicle firing cylinder charge

- Sōkō Sagyō Ki (SS-Ki) – multi-functional armored engineering support vehicle
  - SS Ko Gata
  - SS Otsu Gata
  - SS Hei Gata
  - SS Tei Gata
  - SS Bo Gata (Armored bridge layer)
- Armored recovery vehicle "Se-Ri"
- Armored lumberjack "Ho-K"
- Lumber sweeper "Basso-Ki"
- F B swamp vehicle
- T B swamp scout vehicle
- Type 94 repair vehicle
- Type 95 crane vehicle "Ri-Ki"
- Type 95 collapsible boat
- Snowmobile "Yu-Ki"
- Amphibious Engineer vehicle "Na-Mi"
- Type 94 mobile workshop – consisted of a six-wheel freight car machine vehicle and a towed accompanying vehicle equipped with accessories, spare parts and materials.
- Type 97 "pole planter" and Type 97 "cable layer"
- Type 97 Mini engineer vehicle "Yi-Go" a/k/a Type 98 "Ya-I Go"
- Type 97 "Chi-Yu" mine flail tank – fitted with 2 revolving drums with rows of chains mounted on glacis plates
- Type 97 "mine clearing tank GS" – fitted with rocket launchers. A rocket would be launched with detonating cords affixed from its engine deck.
- Type 97 tank with dozer blades – bulldozer style blade attached onto its front end, which could be detached for combat use of the tank
- Type T-G "bridge layer" – Type 97 chassis with the turret removed; equipped with rollers, which support the "bridging span carrier
- Type 4 work vehicle – designed for airfield construction, used the Type 2 light tank chassis
- Experimental charge layer vehicle had a telescopic arm that was mounted on the turret. It was designed to carry a high explosive charge at the end of the extended arm.
- Experimental obstacle clearance vehicle had a launcher mounted at the center of the tank chassis. The launcher had two torpedo type tubes from which the cylinder-shaped charges would be fired.
- Experimental trench excavator vehicle – it had a trench digging plow in the stern section of the tracked vehicle
- Small remote controlled demolition vehicle

== Army engineer units ==
- 2nd Tank Division Engineer Unit
- 27th Independent Engineer Regiment
- 12th Independent Engineer Regiment
- 5th Independent Engineer Regiment
- 6th Div AIF (Airfield Engineers)
- Airfield Construction Group No.5
- Oil field Construction Group No.2
- 1st company of the 26th Independent Engineer Regiment
- 2nd Independent Engineer Company
- 80th Independent Radio Platoon
- 2nd unit from the Oil well drilling Section of the 21st Field Ordnance Depot
- 1st Field Well Drilling Company
- 2nd Field Well Drilling Company
- 3rd Field Well Drilling Company
- 4th Field Well Drilling Company
- 48th Anchorage Headquarters
- 118th Land Duty Company
- 1st from the 11th Water Supply and Purification Unit
- one platoon of the 12th Engineer Regiment
