= List of armoured fighting vehicles used by the Imperial Japanese Army in the Second Sino-Japanese War =

This is a list of armour used by the Imperial Japanese Army in the Second Sino-Japanese War.

The present list also includes other military armoured vehicles in use at the time (armoured personnel carriers, armoured cars, armoured trains, etc.).

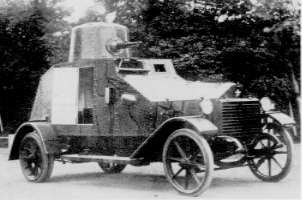
Wolseley armoured car; first produced in 1928 under license by Sumida and used by the IJA in the Mukden Incident of 1931

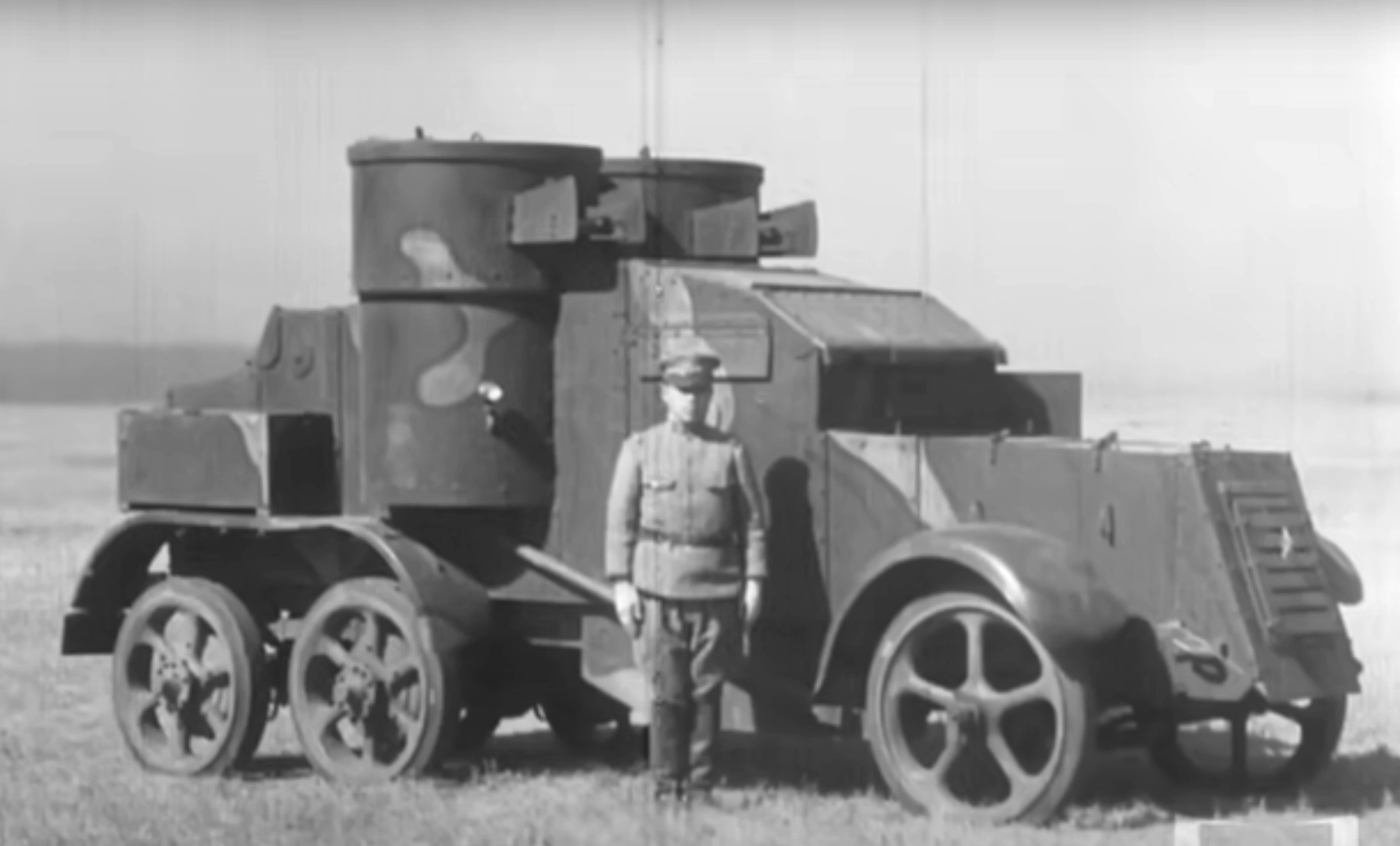
Austin-type Chiyoda armoured car in 1932; used by the Kwantung Army

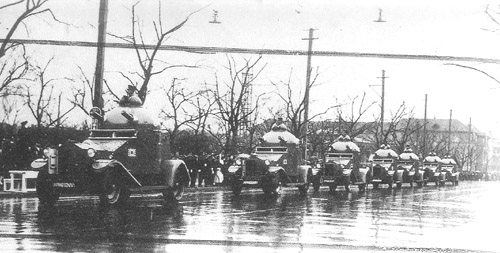
Vickers Crossley armoured cars of the Shanghai Special Naval Landing Force on parade in 1937

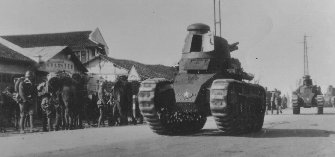
Renault NC series tanks in Manchuria

- Renault FT
- Renault NC27
- Type Ka Kijusha a/k/a Type Ka machine gun car (Carden Loyd tankette)
- Type 89 I-Go medium tanks (Type 89A I-Go Kō and Type 89B I-Go Otsu)
- Type 92 heavy armoured car Jyu-Sokosha - tankette
- Type 94 tankette
- Type 97 Te-Ke tankette
- Type 95 Ha-Go light tank
- Type 97 Chi-Ha medium tank
- Type 97 ShinHōtō Chi-Ha medium tank
- Panzer I - German light tank, captured from Chinese forces
- Vickers Crossley armoured car
- Wolseley armoured car
- Austin-type Chiyoda armoured car
- Chiyoda armored car Type 92
- Sumida M.2593 a/k/a Type 91 armored railroad car So-Mo
  - Sumida Model P armored car
- Type 93 armoured car a/k/a Type 2593 Hokoku and Type 93 Kokusanor
- Type 95 So-Ki armored railroad car
- 20 mm AA machine cannon carrier truck
- Type 1 Ho-Ki armored personnel carrier
- Improvised armoured train
- Special armoured train
- Type 94 armoured train
- Sōkō Sagyō Ki ("SS-Ki") armored engineer vehicles
- Type 95 crane vehicle Ri-Ki
- Armored recovery vehicle Se-Ri
- Type 100 Te-Re observation vehicle
- Type 94 disinfecting vehicle
- Type 94 gas scattering vehicle
