= Type 98 Ke-Ni light tank =

Type 98 Ke-Ni
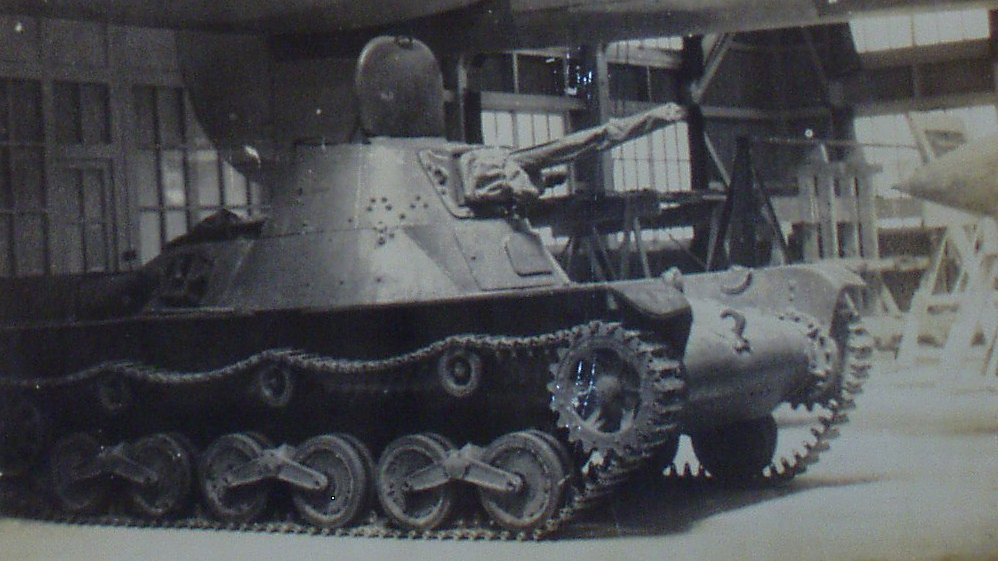
- Type 98A Ke-Ni light tank
- Place of origin: Empire of Japan

Production history
- Designed: 1938
- Produced: 1942–1943
- No. built: 104

Specifications (Type 98A Ke-Ni)
- Mass: 7.2 metric tons (7.1 long tons; 7.9 short tons)
- Length: 4.11 m (13 ft 6 in)
- Width: 2.12 m (6 ft 11 in)
- Height: 1.82 m (6 ft 0 in)
- Crew: 3
- Armor: 10–16 mm (0.39–0.63 in)
- Main armament: Type 100 37 mm (1.46 in) gun
- Secondary armament: 1 x 7.7 mm (0.303 in) Type 97 machine gun
- Engine: Mitsubishi Type 100 air-cooled I-6 diesel 130 hp (97 kW) at 2100 RPM
- Suspension: bellcrank
- Operational range: 300 km (190 mi)
- Maximum speed: 50 km/h (31 mph)

The Type 98 light tank Ke-Ni (九八式軽戦車 ケニ, Kyuhachi-shiki keisensha Ke-Ni) or Type 98A Ke-Ni Ko (also known as Type 98 Chi-Ni light tank) was designed to replace the Imperial Japanese Army's Type 95 Ha-Go light tank, Japan's most numerous armored fighting vehicle during World War II. Although designed before World War II began, production did not start until 1942, with 104 being produced by the end of the war in the Pacific.

== History and development ==
The Type 98 developed in 1938 was a light tank with the same weight as the earlier Type 95 Ha-Go, but with thicker armor. The first prototype was originally known as the "Chi-Ni Model A" and completed by Hino Motors. The second prototype was originally known as the "Chi-Ni Model B" (a/k/a the "Type 98B Ke-Ni Otsu") and completed by Mitsubishi. This second experimental model had a different suspension system with four larger road-wheels, similar to the US Christie suspension design. During field trials the "Model A" demonstrated superior performance, especially in off-road capabilities, so the Hino design was accepted. However, the Hino "Model A" prototype did not enter production at that time. This can be attributed to the adequate performance of the aging Type 95 against obsolete tanks of National Revolutionary Army of the Republic of China forces.

With the start of World War II in the Pacific, the Imperial Japanese Army General Staff realized that the Type 95 design was vulnerable to .50 caliber machine gun fire and attempted to develop a light tank with the same weight as the Type 95, but with thicker armor. A production contract for the Type 98 was awarded to Hino Motors. Series production began in 1942. A total of 104 Type 98s are known to have been built: 1 in 1941, 24 in 1942 and 79 in 1943. By the end of the war, the Imperial Navy had priority on steel for warships and aircraft construction, leaving the Imperial Japanese Army at a low priority for raw material to build tanks.

== Design ==
The design of the Type 98, in comparison to the Type 95, featured thicker, welded armor of improved shape, including the use of a Mitsubishi Type 100 6-Cylinder air-cooled diesel engine, rated at 130 horsepower, and located sideways to make maintenance easier. The height of the tank was 50 cm lower in profile, and slightly lighter and shorter in length than the original Type 95 Ha-Go. It could travel at 50 km/h (31 mph) even with its thicker armor. Three pairs of bogies with six road-wheels connected to the chassis using bell cranks, which transferred any movement in the bogies into sideways motion that was absorbed by springs. This gave the tank better stability over its predecessor.

In contrast to the one-man turret of Type 95 Ha-Go, the Type 98 had a two-man turret, which offered more room for the commander and gunner. There was no commander's cupola on the turret. In the turret was mounted a Type 100 37 mm tank gun with an angle of fire of -15 to +20 degrees, a muzzle velocity of 760 m/s, and also a coaxial 7.7 mm machine gun. Unlike the Type 95 Ha-Go, the driver was located in a central position of the chassis and used a standard steering wheel instead of levers to maneuver the tank.

== Variants ==
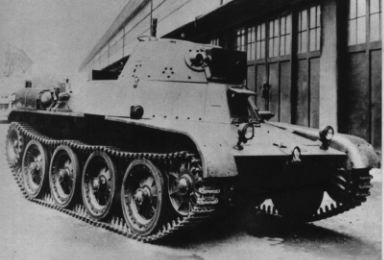
The experimental Type 98B developed by Mitsubishi

- Type 98B Ke-Ni Otsu (九八式軽戦車(乙型), Kyuhachi-shiki keisensha (Otsu-gata))

A Mitsubishi-designed alternative to the Type 98A model made by Hino. The most distinct feature was the suspension with four large road-wheels supported by side-ways facing coil springs, in a manner similar to Christie suspension. It was an experimental model, which never entered production.

- Type 2 Ke-To light tank

An improvement of the Type 98A production model, fitted with the more powerful Type 1 37 mm gun featuring a muzzle velocity of 800 m/s. The new 37 mm gun used gave the tank "slightly better performance". The Type 2 Ke-To went into production in 1944–1945 with 34 tanks built.

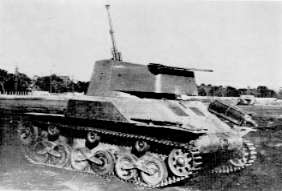
Type 98 Ta-Se anti-aircraft tank

- Type 98 Ta-Se self-propelled anti-aircraft gun

In November 1941, development began on an anti-aircraft version of the Type 98 with a 20 mm AA gun converted from a Type 98 20 mm AA machine cannon in a circumferential turret. The prototype was designated Type 98 Ta-Se. During trials it was determined that the Type 98 chassis was too small to be a stable "firing platform".

- Type 98 20 mm AAG tank

After the short-comings of the prototype Type 98 Ta-Se were noted, a prototype was built with a modified twin Type 2 20 mm AA machine cannon. It was known as the Type 98 20 mm AAG tank. However, the project was canceled and neither one of the Type 98 anti-aircraft tanks went into production.
