= Type 4 Ha-To =

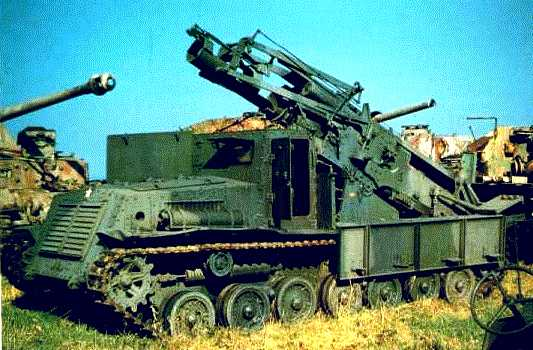
- Type 4 Ha-To self-propelled mortar
- Type: Self-propelled artillery/self-propelled mortar
- Place of origin: Empire of Japan

Production history
- No. built: 4

Specifications
- Mass: 14.3 tons
- Length: 6.8 meters
- Width: 2.4 meters
- Height: 2.75 meters
- Crew: 7
- Armor: 12–25 mm
- Main armament: Type 3 300 mm mortar
- Secondary armament: none
- Engine: water-cooled 6-cyl Mitsubishi gasoline 115 hp (86 kW)
- Power/weight: -
- Suspension: bellcrank
- Maximum speed: 40 km/h

The Type 4 Ha-To (試製四式重迫撃砲 ハト, Shisei yon-shiki jū-hakugekihō hato) was a self-propelled gun with its primary armament being a Type 3 300 mm heavy mortar. Developed by the Imperial Japanese Army for use in World War II, it did not see combat.

== History and design ==
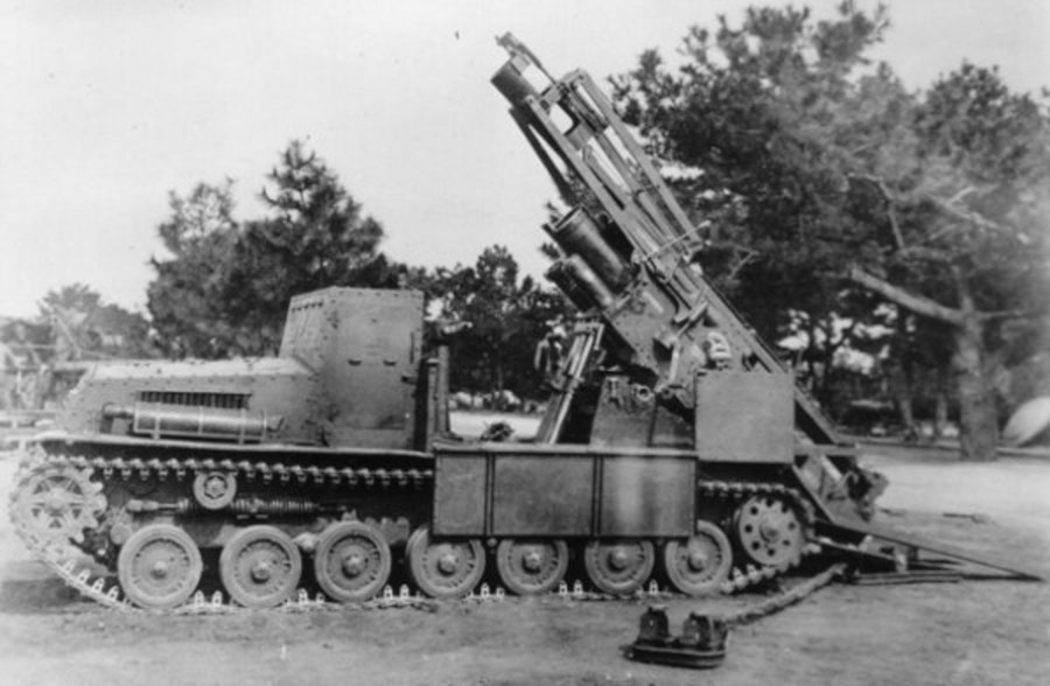
Type 4 Ha-To in firing position

The Type 4 Ha-To was conceived as a mobile fire support platform in late 1943. It made use of the already existing Type 3 300 mm heavy mortar mounted on a modified chassis that was based on the one used for the Type 4 Chi-To medium tank and on the Type 4 Chi-So armored medium tracked carrier. The armor was "thinner" than the Chi-To and the engine compartment was moved to the front. The mortar had a range of 3,000 m (1.9 mi) and launched a 170 kg (374 lb) projectile. The gun itself weighed close to 1.5 tons, and to keep the center of gravity from shifting and tipping the vehicle over, it could not be elevated more than 50 degrees. For transportation the barrel was laid horizontal and when set to fire, the rear and baseplate were lowered down to the ground.

The first prototype was completed in late 1944 and taken to the Imperial Japanese Army Academy for testing. Although testing indicated that it would be an effective weapon, it was expensive to produce, and the Japanese Army Technical Bureau shifted its attention to self-propelled multiple rocket launchers instead, which were easier to produce.

An additional three units were produced before the surrender of Japan, but none were used in combat.
