= Type 1 Ho-Ki =

Japanese World War II era armored personnel carrier

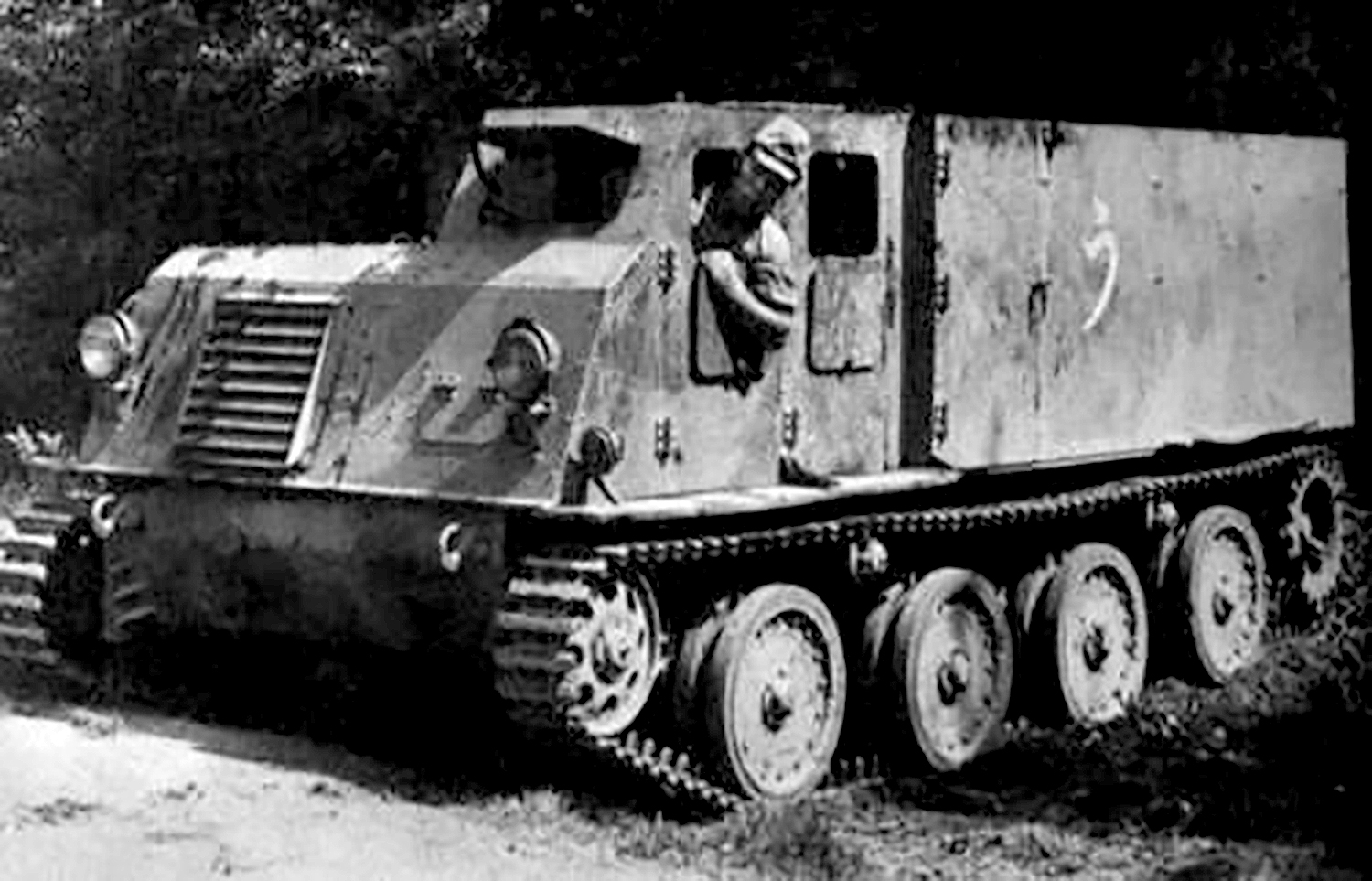
- Type 1 Ho-Ki APC
- Place of origin: Empire of Japan

Production history
- Designed: 1941
- Produced: 1942–1945
- No. built: 200 (estimated)

Specifications
- Mass: 5.5 tonnes (6.1 tons)
- Length: 4.78 meters
- Width: 2.19 meters
- Height: 2.58 meters
- Crew: 1 or 2 + 13 passengers
- Armor: 6 mm front hull, 4 mm sides
- Main armament: none
- Secondary armament: none
- Engine: diesel 134 HP/2000 rpm
- Suspension: bellcrank
- Operational range: 200 kilometers
- Maximum speed: 42 km/h

The Type 1 Ho-Ki (一式装甲兵車 ホキ, Isshiki Sōkōheishahoki Ho-Ki) was a tracked armored personnel carrier (APC) developed by the Imperial Japanese Army in World War II.

== History, development and prototypes ==
The Japanese Army began developing tractors and prime movers in the early 1930s to give the field artillery greater mobility. They included production tractors, such as the Type 92 5 t prime mover I-Ke, Type 92 8 t prime mover Ni-Ku, Type 94 4 t prime mover Yo-Ke, Type 95 13 t prime mover Ho-Fu, Type 98 4 t prime mover Shi-Ke, and the Type 98 6 t prime mover Ro-Ke. All lacked armour and were small tracker type designs, except for the Type 98 6 t prime mover Ro-Ke of 1939, and the subsequent experimental 16 t prime mover Chi-Ke of 1940/41. The Type 98 6 t prime mover Ro-Ke had six road wheels on each side of the chassis and weighed 6.9 tons. The experimental 16 t prime mover Chi-Ke was a heavy prime mover with five road wheels on each side and a small crane at the back end. It did not go into production.

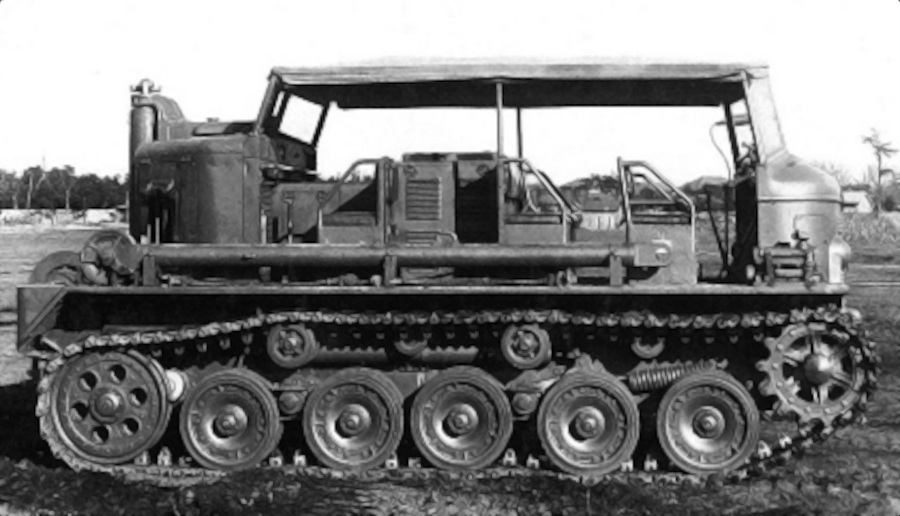
Experimental 16 t prime mover Chi-Ke

The Type 1 Ho-Ki was produced as a result of a request from the army for a heavy armoured artillery tractor, which could also serve as a personnel transport in order to increase the motorization and cross-country capabilities of the land forces. Development of both tracked and half-track APCs intensified in 1941, with two production versions confusingly designated “Type 1" (see the Type 1 Ho-Ha half-track).

Several APC prototypes of what became known as the Type 1 Ho-Ki were built. The first one was built on a Type 92 tankette chassis and known as the experimental Type TC. A second prototype built was known as the experimental Type TE. An experimental prime mover version of the Type TE was also tested. Thereafter, an experimental prime mover version known as the Type TG was produced, which had a further modified undercarriage without support rollers.

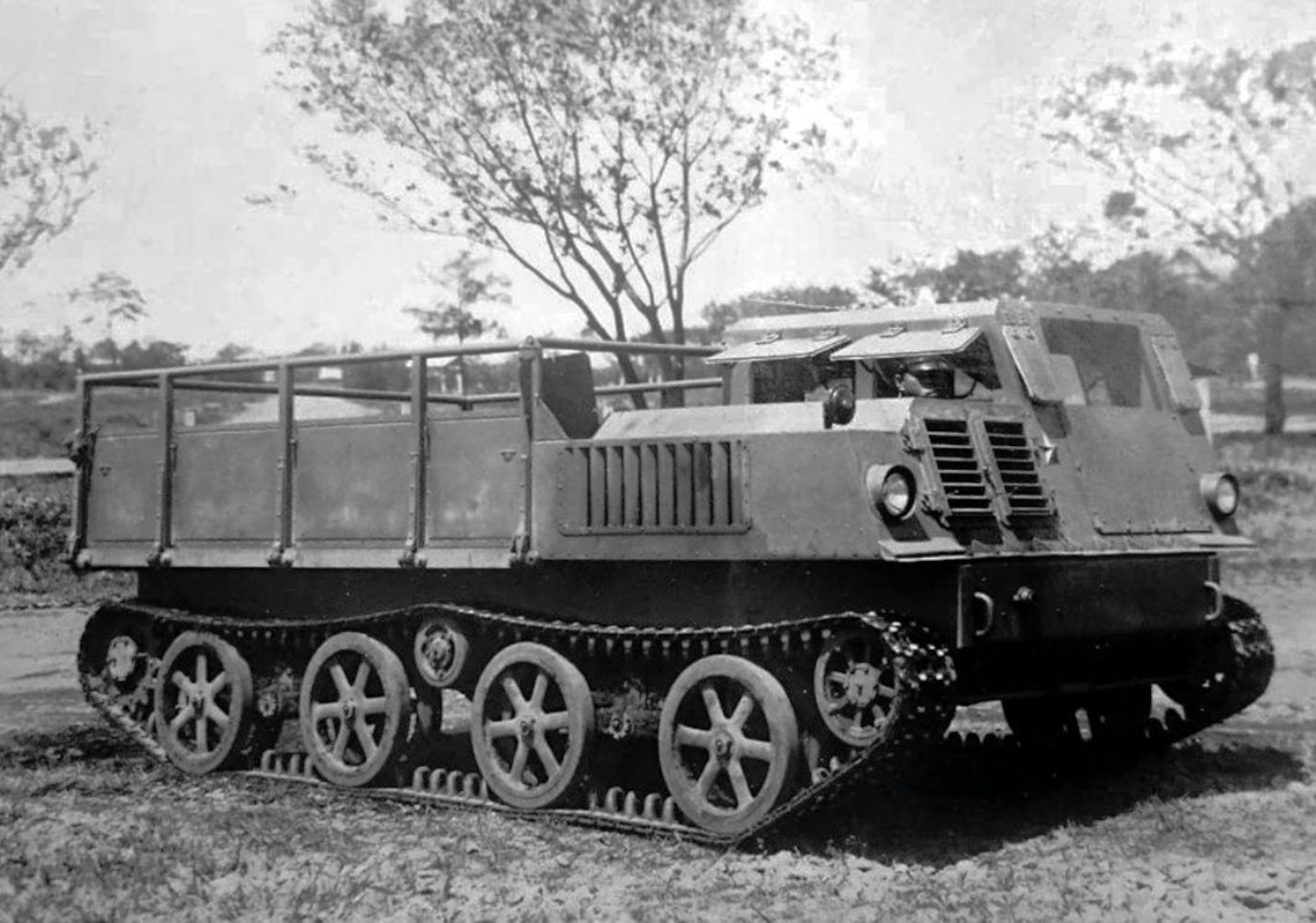
Side view of fully tracked prototype Type TE

The Type 1 Ho-Ki was built by Hino Motors, but only in small quantities. Although the Japanese Army had employed mechanized infantry formations in China from the mid-1930s, the general view of field commanders was that armored transports were too slow compared with normal trucks, and thereby unable to keep up with the speed necessary for contemporary infantry tactics. In addition, with the priorities of Japanese military production focusing on combat aircraft, warships and other offensive weaponry, most of the experimental APC and AFV designs never made it past the prototype stage. By the time the Type 1 Ho-Ki entered regular production in 1944, raw materials were in very short supply, and much of Japan's industrial infrastructure had been destroyed by American bombing. An exact total number of the units produced is unknown.

== Design ==
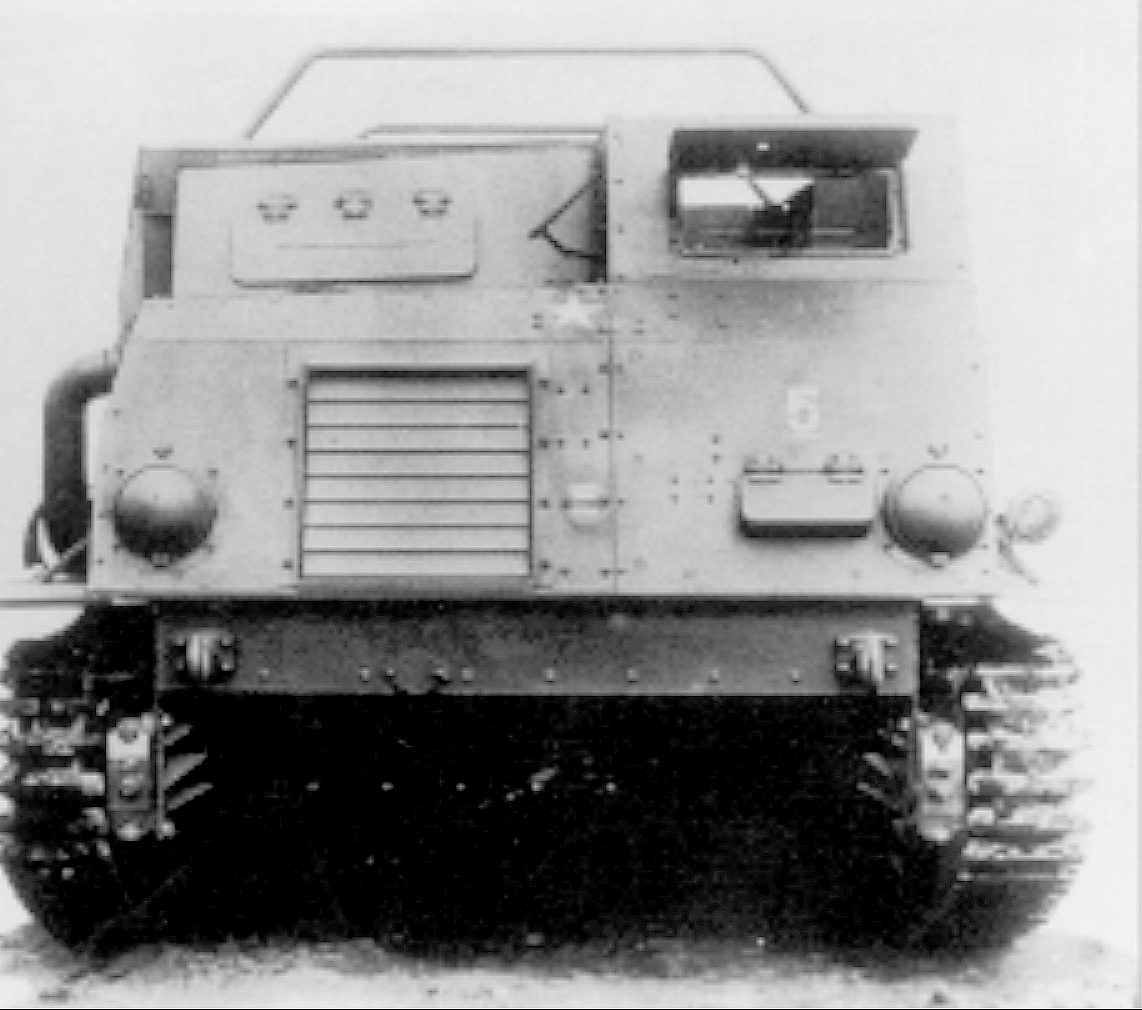
Front view of a Type 1 Ho-Ki

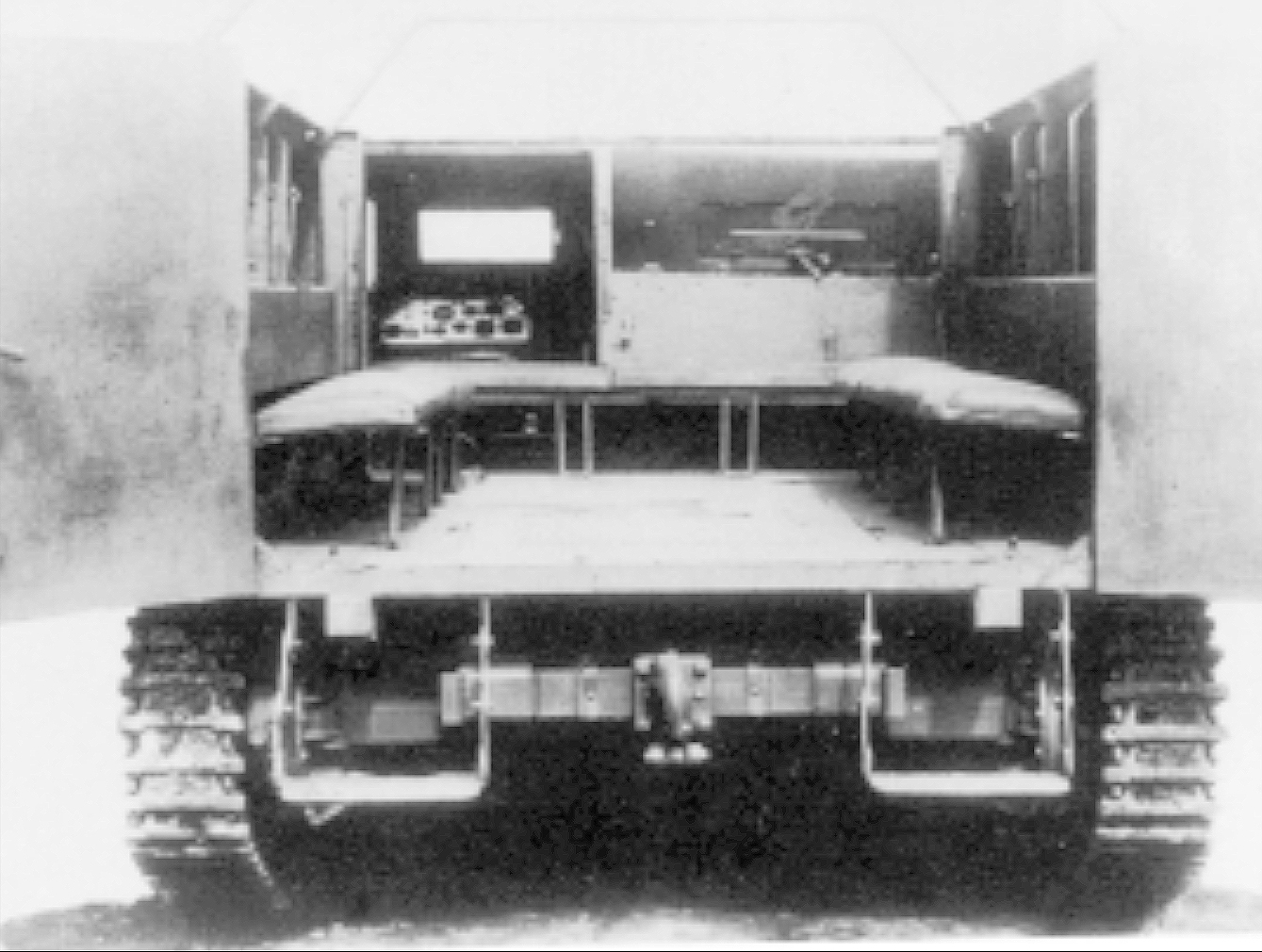
Rear view of a Type 1 Ho-Ki with doors open

The Type 1 Ho-Ki was designed to be heavily armored and versatile. It could be used to carry supplies, to tow artillery, as well as to carry infantry. They were produced in three basic variants, a supply carrier, artillery prime mover and armored personnel carrier.

The Type 1 Ho-Ki had an unusual silhouette, in that the driver's cab did not extend across the front of the hull, but stopped about mid-way across the center line. Only one driver was required, who manipulated the left and right movement of the tracks via a pair of small steering wheels. The crew consisted of a driver and commander, with transport capacity of 13 or 14 men, and the maximum armor thickness was 6 mm for the front hull. The vehicle had, from the left (driver's) side, three doors mounted in tandem for exit. In addition, the armored personnel carrier variant had a rear hinged double door for troop exit. The hull was welded construction and it was "open-topped", akin to the Type 1 Ho-Ha. The engine compartment was located at the right front of the body, next to the driver's compartment. The engine was a 6-cylinder, in-line, valve-in-head, air-cooled diesel. The transmission was located in the rear. The gearbox had eight forward gears and two reverse gears. This allowed for more flexibility in speed and torque, in accordance to where and how it was being used.

The Type 1 Ho-Ki was not normally armed, but provision was made for mounting machine guns to the rear of the driver on the sides of the troop compartment. The Type 92 heavy machine gun carried by Japanese infantry squads could be mounted accordingly. Although it was an APC, it was often mistakenly called a half-track.

== Combat record ==
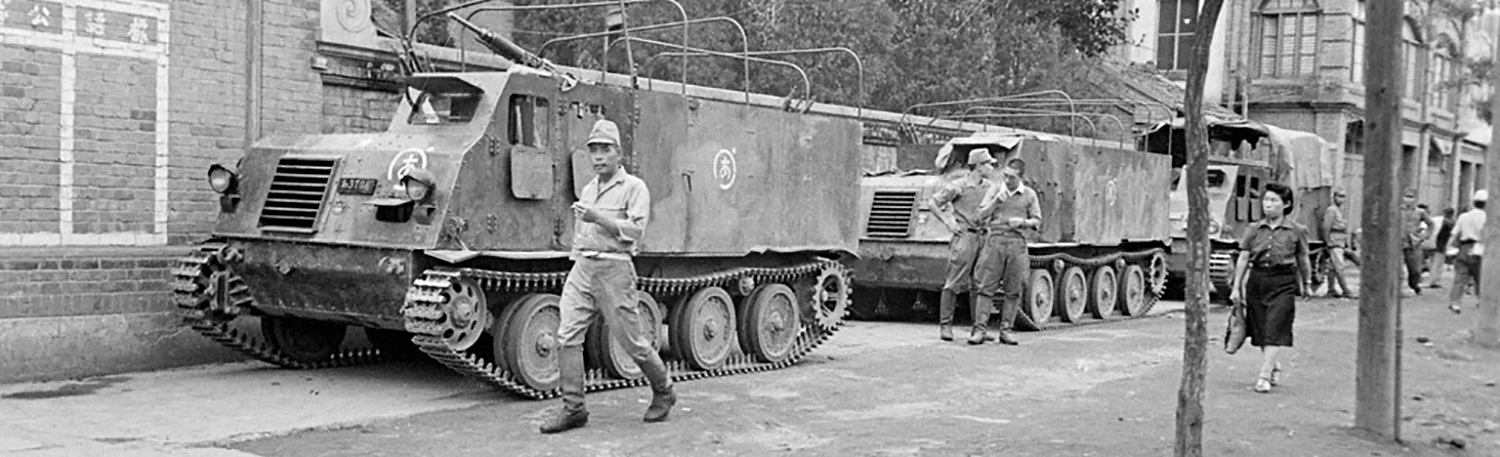
Three Type 1 Ho-Ki tracked APCs in China, 1945

Initial deployment of the Type 1 Ho-Ki was to China for operations in the Second Sino-Japanese War. Type 1 Ho-Ki vehicles were later deployed to Burma and the Philippines in 1944. Units of the 2nd Tank Division were reassigned to the Japanese Fourteenth Area Army and sent to the Philippines, where it was deployed on the main island of Luzon. The 2nd Tank Division had a shortage of half-tracks, therefore, at least four Type 1 Ho-Ki's were used for troop transport on Luzon during the Battle of the Philippines.
