= Type 2 Ke-To light tank =

Type 2 Ke-To
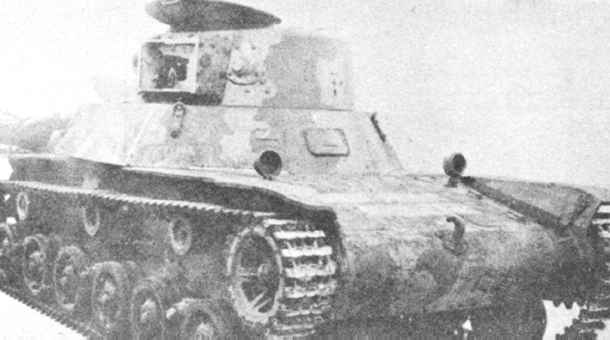
- Type 2 Ke-To light tank
- Type: Light tank
- Place of origin: Empire of Japan

Production history
- Designed: 1941
- Produced: 1944–1945
- No. built: 34

Specifications (Type 2 Ke-To)
- Mass: 7.2 tons
- Length: 4.11 m (13 ft 6 in)
- Width: 2.12 m (6 ft 11 in)
- Height: 1.82 m (6 ft 0 in)
- Crew: 3
- Armor: 6–16 mm
- Main armament: Type 1 37 mm tank gun
- Secondary armament: 7.7 mm machine gun
- Engine: Mitsubishi Type 100 air-cooled diesel 130 hp (97 kW)
- Suspension: bellcrank
- Operational range: 186 kilometers
- Maximum speed: 50 km/h

The Type 2 Ke-To (二式軽戦車 ケト, Nishiki keisensha Ke-To) was a light tank of World War II, produced in small numbers for the Imperial Japanese Army as an improvement of the existing Type 98 Ke-Ni. No Type 2 Ke-To light tanks are known to have engaged in combat prior to Japan's surrender at the end of World War II.

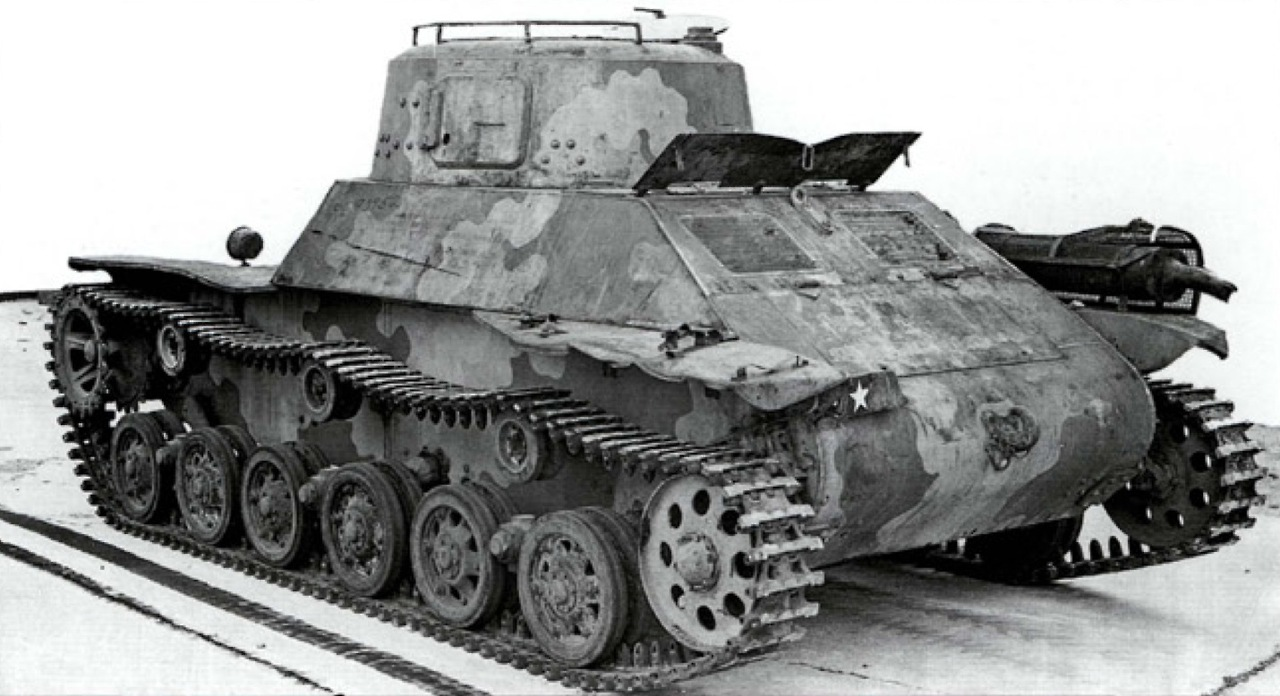
Rear view of a Type 2 Ke-To

== Design ==
The Type 2 Ke-To was based on the Type 98 Ke-Ni, using the same engine and bell crank suspension. However, the gun turret was enlarged to provide greater space for the crewmen and the main armament was changed to the more powerful Type 1 37 mm gun, with a muzzle velocity of 800 m/s. The new 37 mm gun used gave the tank "slightly better performance". The conical turret also carried a 7.7 mm machine-gun in a coaxial mount. Besides these modifications, the tank was essentially the same as the Type 98 Ke-Ni, using the same hull, engine and having the same maximum armor plate. The designation "Type 2" represented the Japanese Imperial Year 2602 (1942 AD), "Ke" represented "light", and "To" represented the number seven.

== Production ==
Production commenced in 1944, with 34 units completed by the end of the war. No Type 2 Ke-To light tanks are known to have engaged in combat prior to Japan's surrender at the end of World War II.

== Variants ==
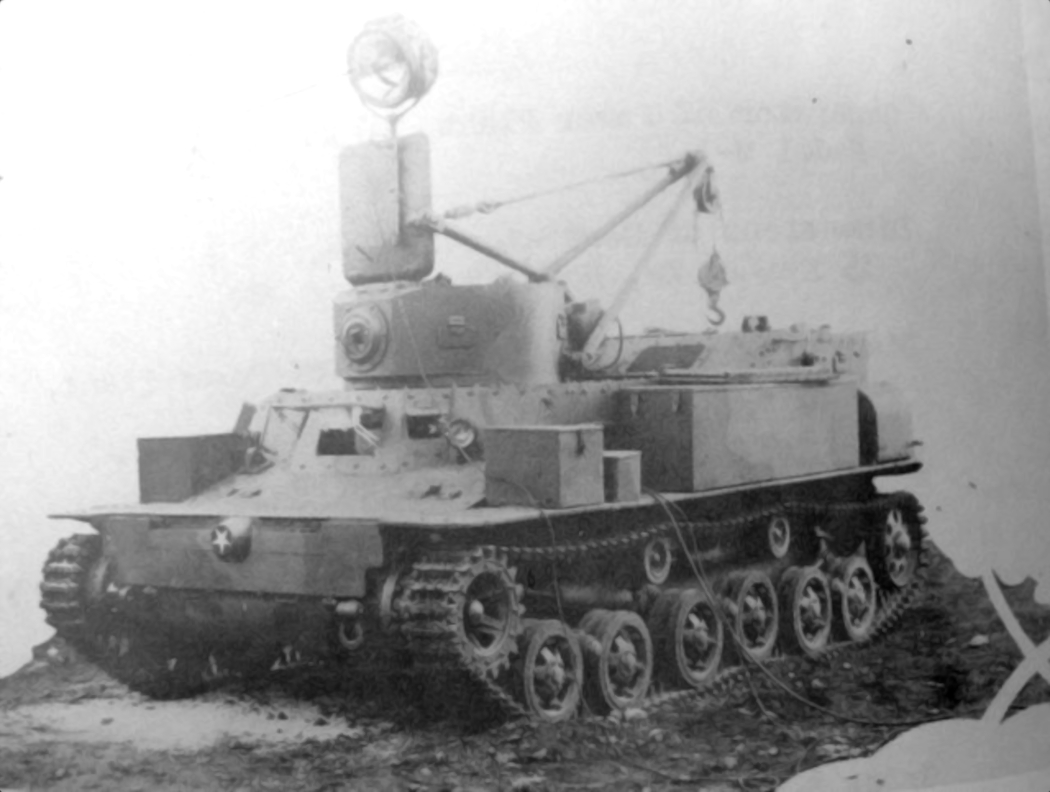
Prototype Type 2 Ke-To based work vehicle

- Prototype work vehicle

An experimental "work vehicle" based on the Type 2 Ke-To light tank was produced in 1944. The armament consisted of a Type 97 7.7 mm machine gun in a smaller, modified turret. It was equipped with a 30kw generator, a flood light for night work and a light crane behind the tower.

- Type 4 work vehicle

An engineering vehicle developed in late 1944 on the chassis of the Type 2 Ke-To light tank. It was equipped with a dozer blade on the front end for use in airfield construction. It was also equipped with a 30kw generator to power tools and a flood light for night work. The exact number produced is not known.

- Type 4 Ke-Nu light tank

According to Japanese author and researcher Akira Takizawa, the Type 4 Ke-Nu light tank, was a variant of the Type 2 Ke-To featuring a new turret and a Type 1 47 mm tank gun. A total of Twenty-eight incomplete tanks were found at the Kobeseiko factory at the end of war.
