= Type 2 Ho-I =

- Type 2 Ho-I gun tank
- Type: Infantry support tank Assault gun
- Place of origin: Empire of Japan

Service history
- Used by: Imperial Japanese Army

Production history
- Produced: 1944
- No. built: 31

Specifications
- Mass: 16.1 tons
- Length: 5.73 m (18 ft 10 in)
- Width: 2.33 m (7 ft 8 in)
- Height: 2.58 m (8 ft 6 in)
- Crew: 5
- Armor: 12–50 mm
- Main armament: 75 mm Type 99 gun
- Secondary armament: 1 x 7.7 mm Type 97 machine gun
- Engine: Mitsubishi Type 100 air cooled V-12 diesel 240 hp (179 kW)
- Power/weight: 14.9 hp/tonne
- Suspension: bellcrank
- Operational range: 100 km
- Maximum speed: 44 km/h (27 mph)

The Type 2 gun tank Ho-I (二式砲戦車 ホイ, Ni-shiki hōsensha Ho-I) was a derivative of the Type 97 Chi-Ha medium tanks of the Imperial Japanese Army in World War II. Similar in concept to the early variants of the German Panzer IV, it was designed as a self-propelled howitzer to provide the close-in fire support for standard Japanese medium tanks with additional firepower against enemy anti-tank fortifications.

== History and development ==
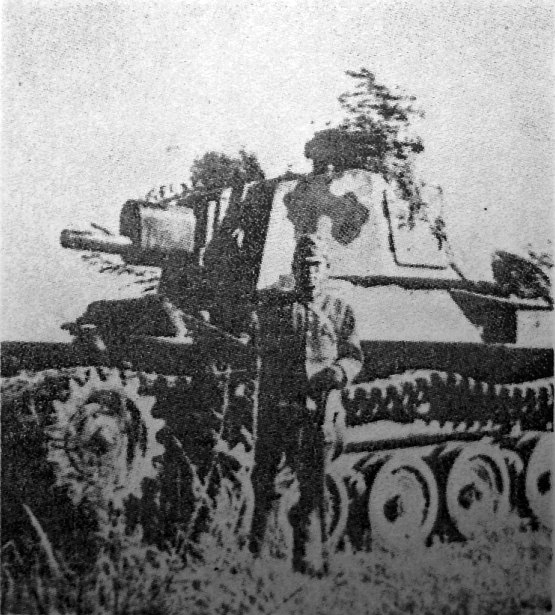
Experimental Type 1 gun tank Ho-I, 1941

Design work on the Type 2 Ho-I began in 1937, after experience in Manchukuo taught Japanese war planners that an armored vehicle with a larger weapon would be useful against fortified enemy positions such as pillboxes, against which the standard low-velocity 57mm and high-velocity 47mm tank guns were ineffective. Since this vehicle was to be able to keep up with the rest of an armored formation, the Japanese began work on mounting a Type 41 75 mm mountain gun onto the chassis of the Type 97 Chi-Ha medium tank. The adapted mountain gun was known as the Type 99 75 mm tank gun. The gun could fire an assortment of ammunition, including a 6.6 kg (14.5 lb) armor-piercing shell and had a muzzle velocity of 445 mps. A prototype using the Type 97 Chi-Ha chassis was built in 1941. It was known as the Experimental Type 1 Ho-I. By 1942 the Type 99 75 mm gun was fitted into a modified Type 97 Shinhōtō Chi-Ha turret, which led to the designated Type 2 Ho-I gun tank.

== Design ==
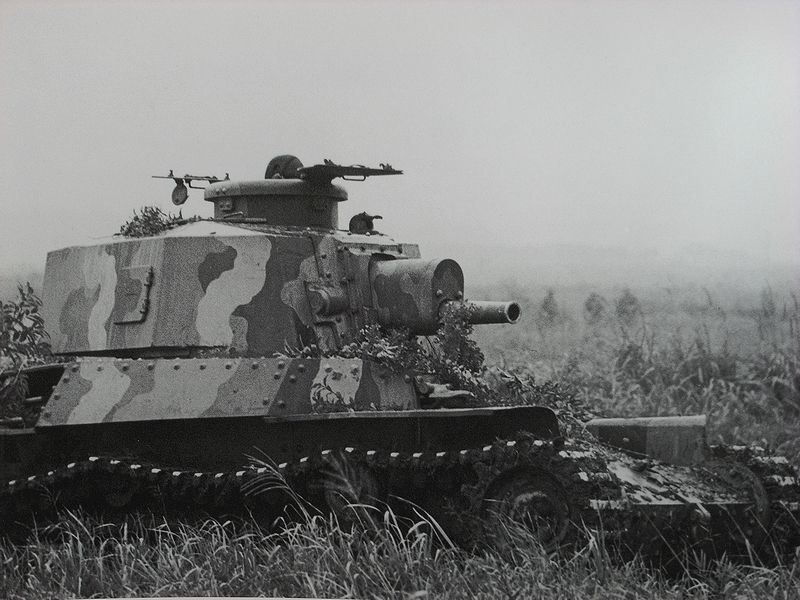
Experimental Type 1 gun tank Ho-I, side view

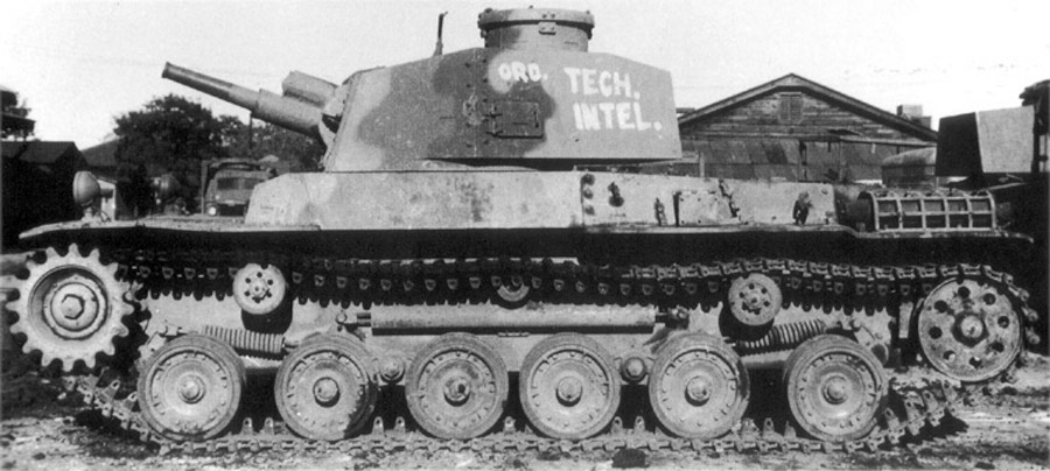
Type 2 gun tank Ho-I, side view

The 1944 production model utilized the chassis of the Type 1 Chi-He medium tank, which was itself a modified Type 97 Chi-Ha hull. The main armament of the Type 2 Ho-I was a Type 99 75 mm tank gun, and secondary armament was a single 7.7 mm Type 97 light machine gun in the hull. The short barreled 75 mm Type 99 gun was mounted in a gun turret of the type used for the Type 97 Shinhōtō Chi-Ha tank with modifications to accommodate the gun used and the addition of a large rear hatch.

== Service history ==
The Type 2 Ho-I gun tank was intended to be part of a fire support company in each of the tank regiments. As with other tanks and self-propelled guns, production was hampered by material shortages, and by the bombing of Japan in World War II. All 31 Type 2 Ho-I tanks produced were conversions from existing Type 1 Chi-He medium tanks. There is no record of a Type 2 Ho-I being used in combat prior to the end of the war.
