= List of Type 97 Chi-Ha variants =

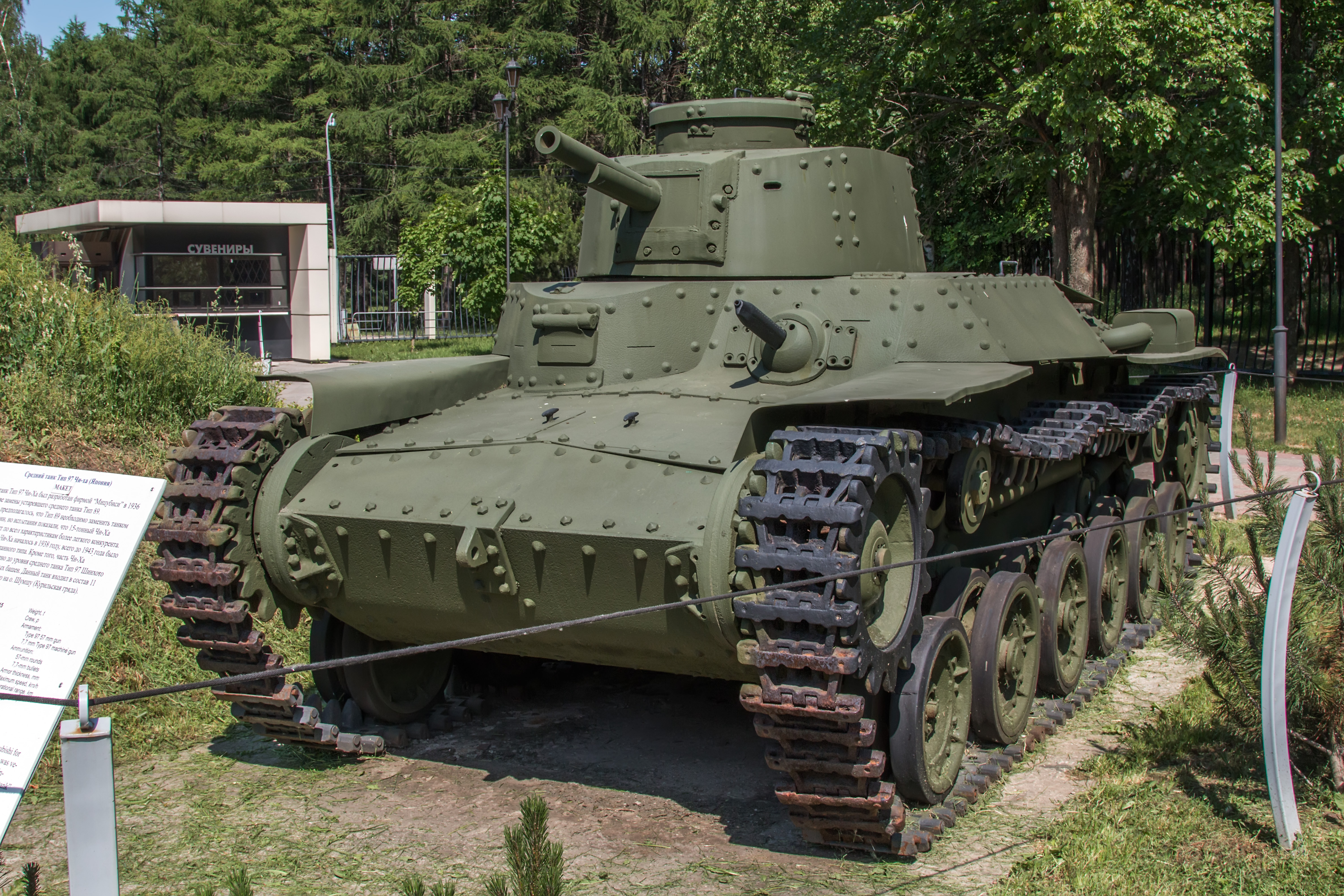
Type 97 Chi-Ha

This is a list of vehicles developed from the Japanese Type 97 Chi-Ha medium tank and its direct lineage.

== Amphibious tanks and armoured carriers ==
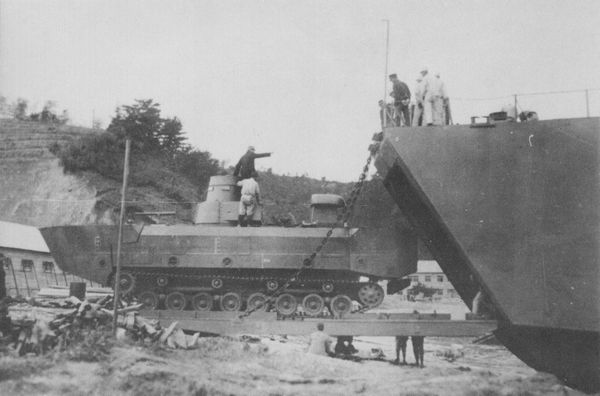
Type 3 Ka-Chi amphibious tank

- Type 3 Ka-Chi

Amphibious tank derived from a modified Type 1 Chi-He chassis, armed with a Type 1 47 mm main gun and two 7.7 mm machine guns.

- Type 4 Ka-Tsu

Amphibious, armoured, cargo/troop tracked carrier that was developed by the Imperial Japanese Navy (IJN). The engine component and electric devices were watertight and it could be carried underwater attached to a submarine. The twin drive propeller shafts were designed to retract "into their ducts" once the vehicle reached shore.

- Type 5 To-Ku

Amphibious tank armed with one 47 mm gun, one 25 mm Type 1 gun and two 7.7 mm Type 97 machine guns. The turret was a modified version of the one used on the Type 97 Shinhoto Chi-Ha with a Type 5 Chi-Ri hull. According to one source a prototype was completed.

== Engineering vehicles ==
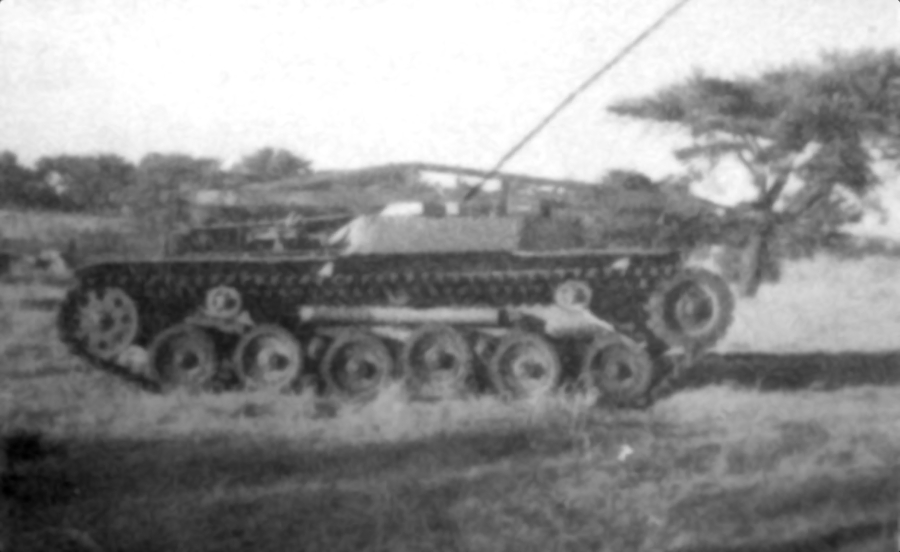
Experimental obstacle clearance vehicle

- Experimental obstacle clearance vehicle

Based on the Type 97 Chi-Ha, development began in March 1941. It was designed to destroy obstacles such as barbed wire fence and impenetrable undergrowth with a launched cylinder charge. At the center of the tank chassis was mounted a launcher. The launcher had two torpedo type tubes from which the cylinder-shaped charges would be fired. After being launched, a cylinder charge could travel about 10 meters. One prototype was made, after which the project was cancelled in July 1943.

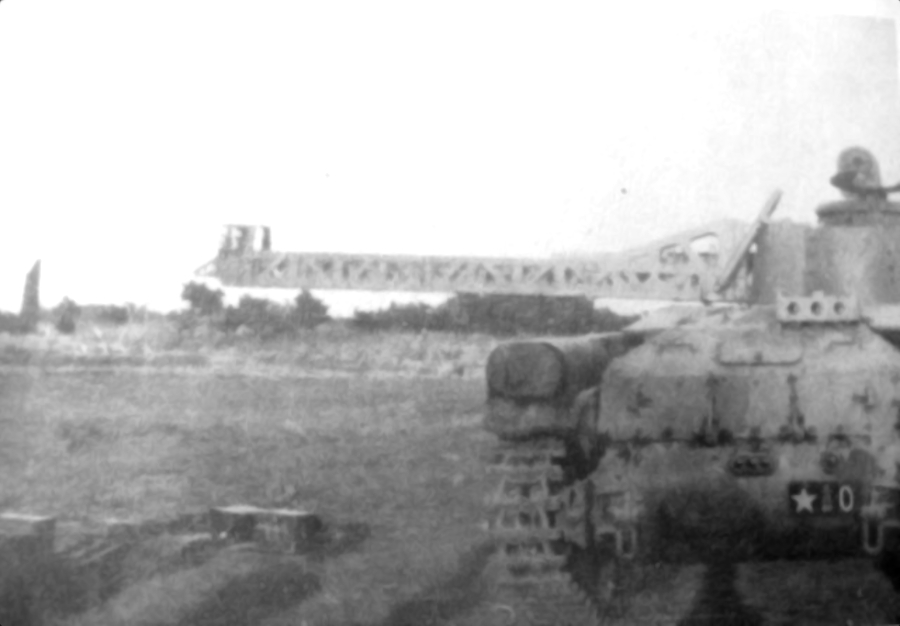
Experimental charge layer vehicle

- Experimental charge layer vehicle

Derived from the Type 97 tank, it had a telescopic lattice arm that was mounted on the turret. The telescopic arm could extend out to 12 meters. It was designed to carry a high explosive charge at the end of the extended arm for destroying pillboxes and bunkers.

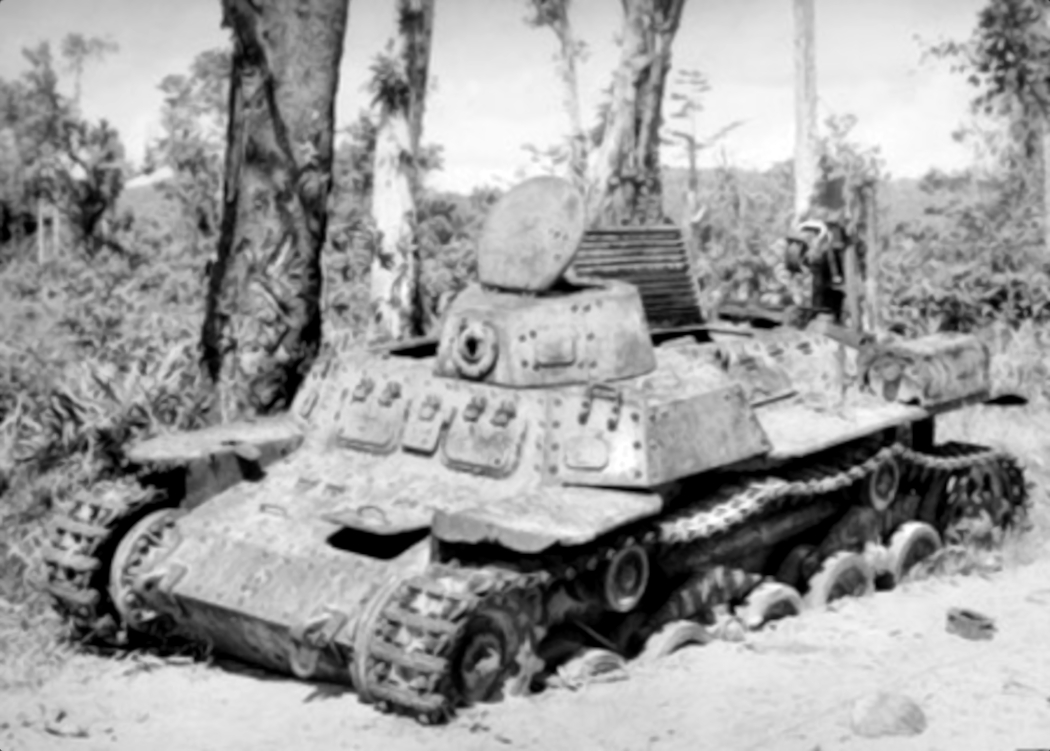
Experimental trench excavator vehicle

- Experimental trench excavator vehicle

Derived from the Type 97 tank, it had a heavy trench digging plow in the stern section of the tracked vehicle. This vehicle was produced around 1941-42 for service in Manchuria. For armament it had a Type 97 7.7 mm machine gun in the turret. At least one example was sent to Wewak on the north coast of Papua-New Guinea for field testing.

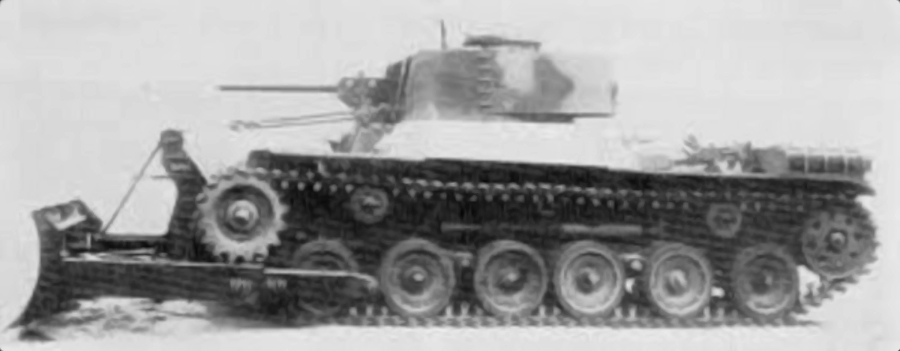
Type 97 Shinhōtō Chi-Ha medium tank with dozer blade

- Type 97 tank with dozer blades

This consisted of a standard Type 97 medium tank with a bulldozer style blade attached onto its front end. The variant was intended mostly for use in airfield construction. The blade could be detached for combat use of the tank, which occurred during the Philippines campaign (1944–1945). In total, there was only a limited number of blades that were produced by the end of the war. A post-war variant was produced by Mitsubishi, where the turret and guns were removed. The post-war variant vehicle was used for reconstruction in Japan.

== Medium tanks ==
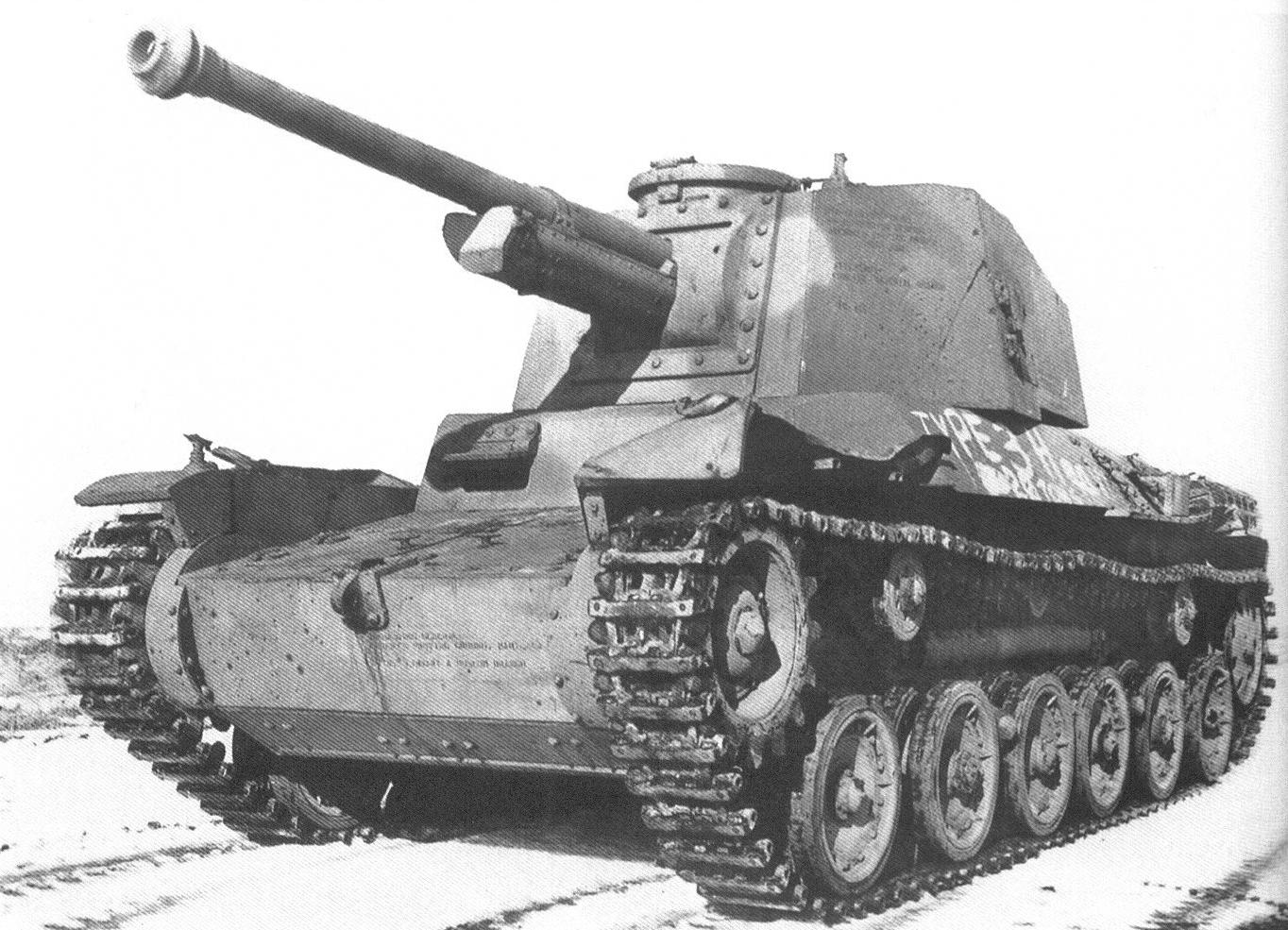
Type 3 Chi-Nu medium tank

- Experimental Type 98 Chi-Ho medium tank

Prototype medium tank designed in 1939, with two built in 1940 and two built in 1941. It did not enter production.

- Type 97 ShinHōtō Chi-Ha medium tank (a/k/a Type 97 Chi-Ha Kai or Type 97/47)

Type 97 tank with a new larger gun turret and armed with the Type 1 47 mm gun.

- Type 1 Chi-He medium tank

A successor to the Chi-Ha. The speed and the armor were better than the Chi-Ha, but it still had only a Type 1 47 mm main gun.

- Type 3 Chi-Nu medium tank

Developed in order to cope with M4 Sherman. Its hull is the same of Chi-He and its Type 3 75 mm gun was converted from the 75 mm Type 90 field gun. It had a large new hexagonal gun turret and a commander's cupola. The Chi-Nu was deployed in Japan proper to counter the expected Allied invasion. It was the last design based directly on Type 97 lineage.

== Gun tanks ==
Type 2 Ho-I gun tank

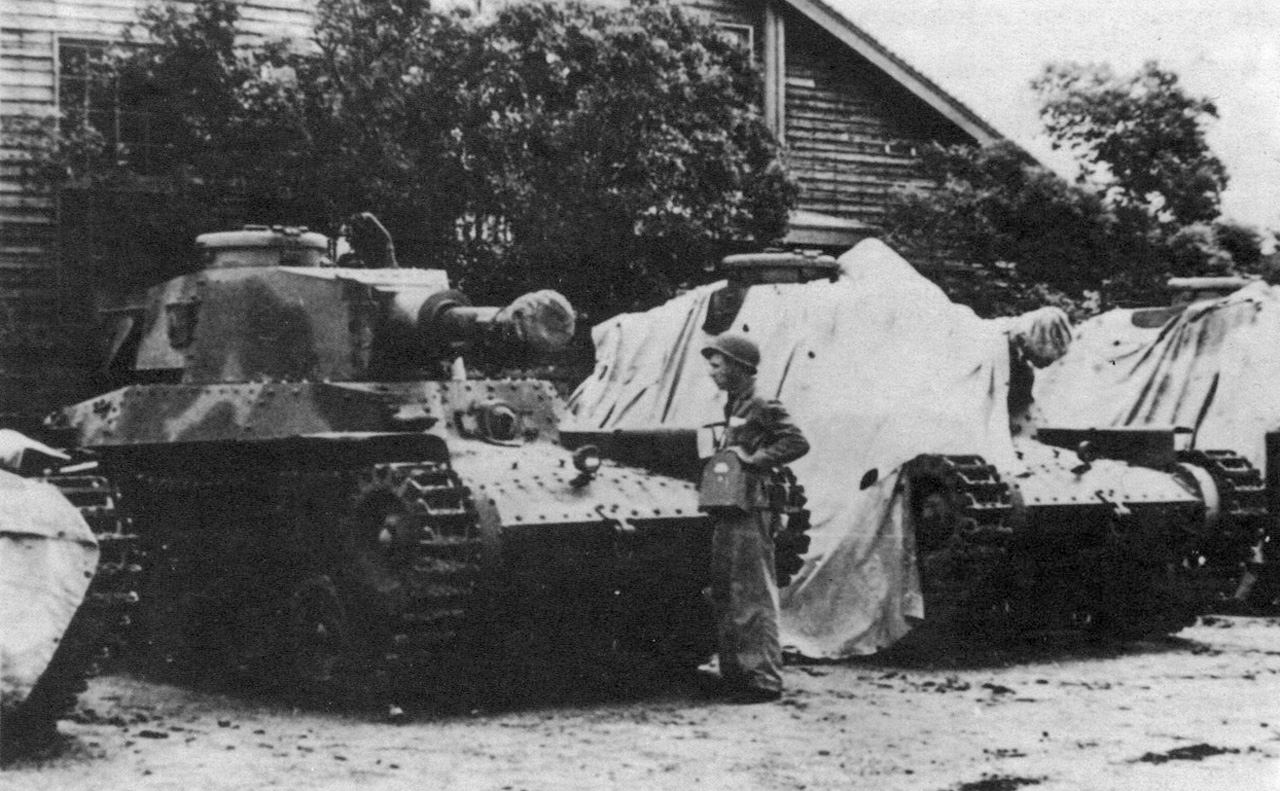
Short barrel 120 mm gun tanks

- Type 2 Ho-I medium gun tank

The Imperial Japanese Army called close fire support tanks, "gun tanks". The experimental Type 1 Ho-I model was based on the Chi-Ha and mounted a short barrel Type 99 75 mm tank gun. The Type 2 Ho-I production model was based on the Chi-He and mounted the same main gun. They were intended to be deployed in a fire support company in each of the tank regiments. There is no record of a Ho-I being used in action as they were deployed in Japan to defend against the expected Allied invasion.

- Short barrel 120 mm gun tank

Late in World War II, this Type 97 ShinHōtō Chi-Ha variant was produced for the Imperial Japanese Navy. The standard 47 mm main gun was replaced with a short barrel naval 12 cm (120 mm) "anti-submarine" gun with a muzzle brake added. A limited number of "about a dozen" were produced for deployment by the Japanese Special Naval Landing Forces.

== Self-propelled guns ==
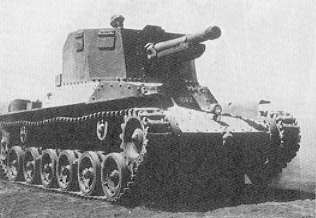
Type 1 Ho-Ni II self-propelled gun

- Type 1 Ho-Ni I 75 mm SP AT gun

Turret removed and 75 mm gun installed in an open casemate to create a self-propelled gun. They were organized along similar lines as artillery units. They saw combat action, being first deployed at the Battle of Luzon in the Philippines in 1945.

- Type 1 Ho-Ni II 105 mm SPG

Type 91 105 mm gun installed on the same modified Type 97 chassis as the Ho-Ni I with a slightly changed superstructure as far as the side armor with re-positioned observation visors.

- Type 3 Ho-Ni III 75 mm SP AT gun

The Ho-Ni III had a Type 3 75 mm tank gun mount in a fully enclosed casemate and was deployed in tank regiments as a tank destroyer. Most were stationed within the Japanese home islands to defend against the projected Allied Invasion.

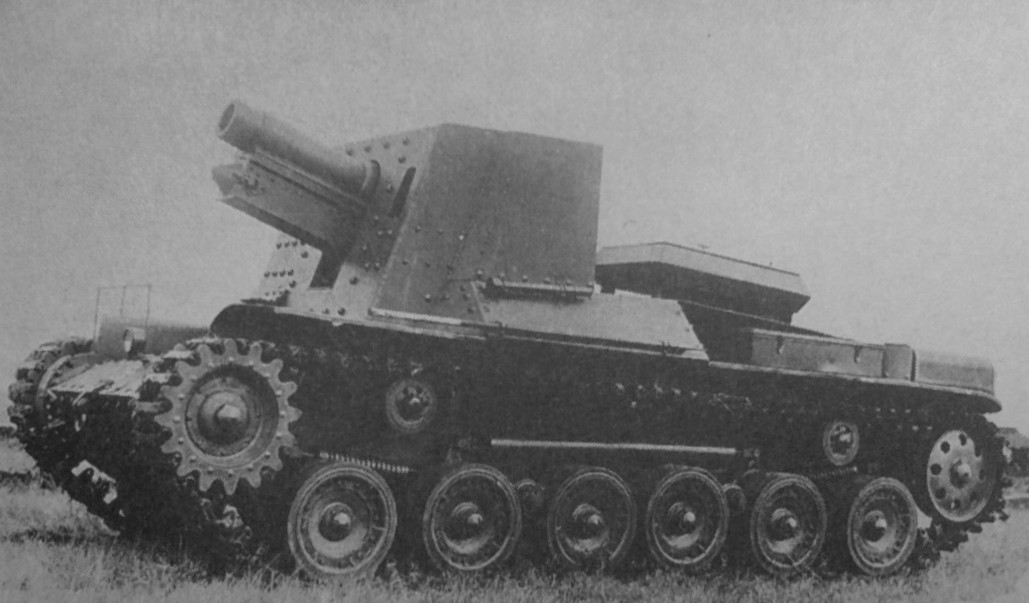
Type 4 Ho-Ro self-propelled gun

- Type 4 Ho-Ro 15 cm SP howitzer

SPG with Type 38 15 cm (149.1 mm) howitzer on a modified Type 97 chassis, similar to Ho-Ni I SPG with a front gun shield, which only extended a very short distance on the sides. They were deployed in a piecemeal fashion, seeing combat during the Philippines Campaign and the Battle of Okinawa.

- Naval 12 cm SPG or Long barrel 120 mm SPG

A one-off SPG developed by the Imperial Japanese Navy with a naval Type 10 120 mm gun mounted on a modified Type 97 tank chassis.

- Experimental Type 5 15 cm SPG Ho-Chi

SPG with a Type 96 15 cm (149.1 mm) howitzer on a modified Type 97 chassis. Similar to Ho-Ni and Ho-Ro SPGs with an open casemate. Stage of development unknown.

- Chinese 75 MM SPG

SPG using a Type 94 75 mm mountain gun developed by the Republic of China in 1948 using captured Type 97 Chi-Ha chassis and Japanese mountain guns in order to provide firepower lacking after US deliveries of equipment were stopped. Additionally armed with two Chinese made ZB vz. 26 machine guns, they were used in the Chinese Civil War.

== Other variants ==
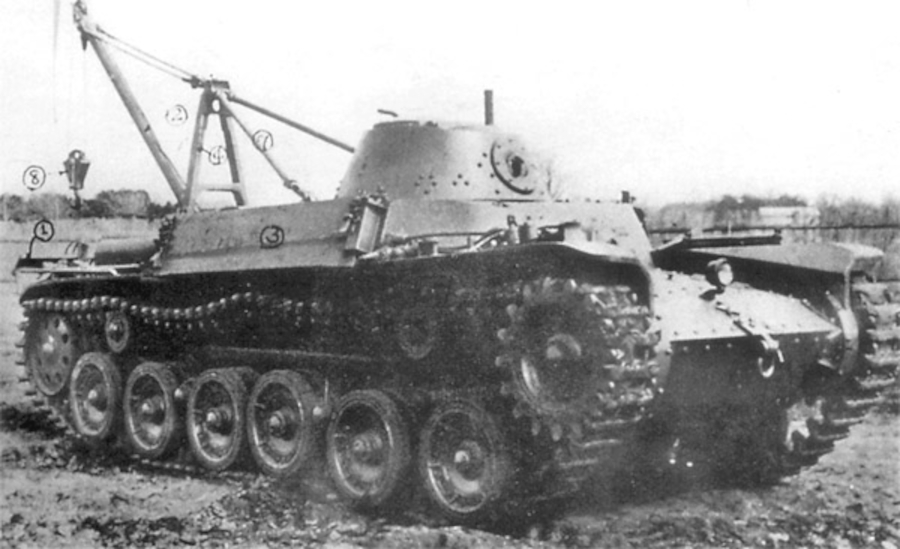
Armoured recovery vehicle Se-Ri

- Se-Ri

Armoured recovery vehicle on a modified Type 97 chassis with a collapsible crane powered by a Type 100 240 hp diesel engine. The winch was located over the rear deck of the engine compartment. The Se-Ri also had "external stowage ranks" on each side of the hull. A machine gun turret replaced the main gun turret used on the Type 97 Chi-Ha tank. Introduced in 1939, three were produced.

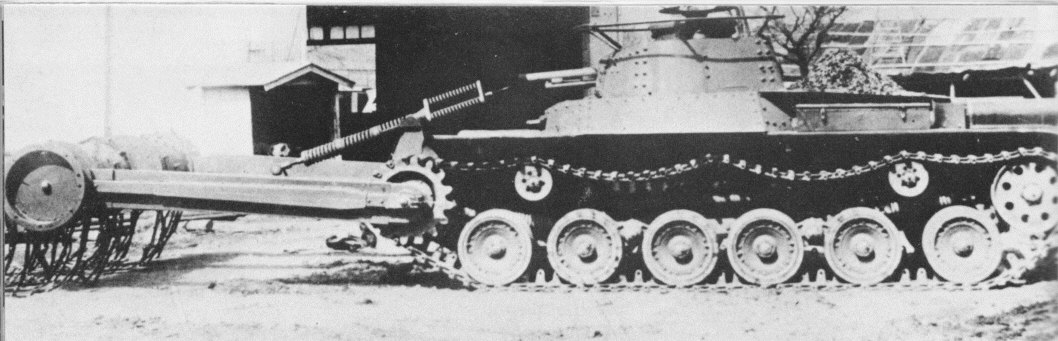
Type 97 Chi-Yu mine flail tank

- Type 97 Chi-Yu mine flail tank

Type 97 Chi-Ha fitted with 2 revolving drums with rows of chains mounted on glacis plates and linked to the drive wheels for clearing a mine-field. The prototype copied the design of the British mine flail tanks.

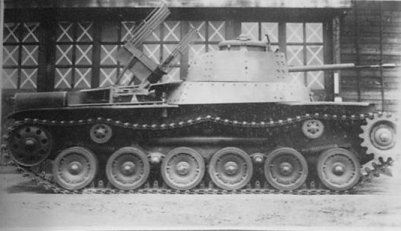
Type 97 mine clearing tank GS fitted with rocket launchers

- Type 97 mine clearing tank GS

Type 97 Chi-Ha fitted with rocket launchers. First produced in 1943. A rocket would be launched with detonating cords affixed from its engine deck. The tank also had a rocket launcher at the rear MG position on the turret. It launched a Bangalore torpedo affixed to a rocket.

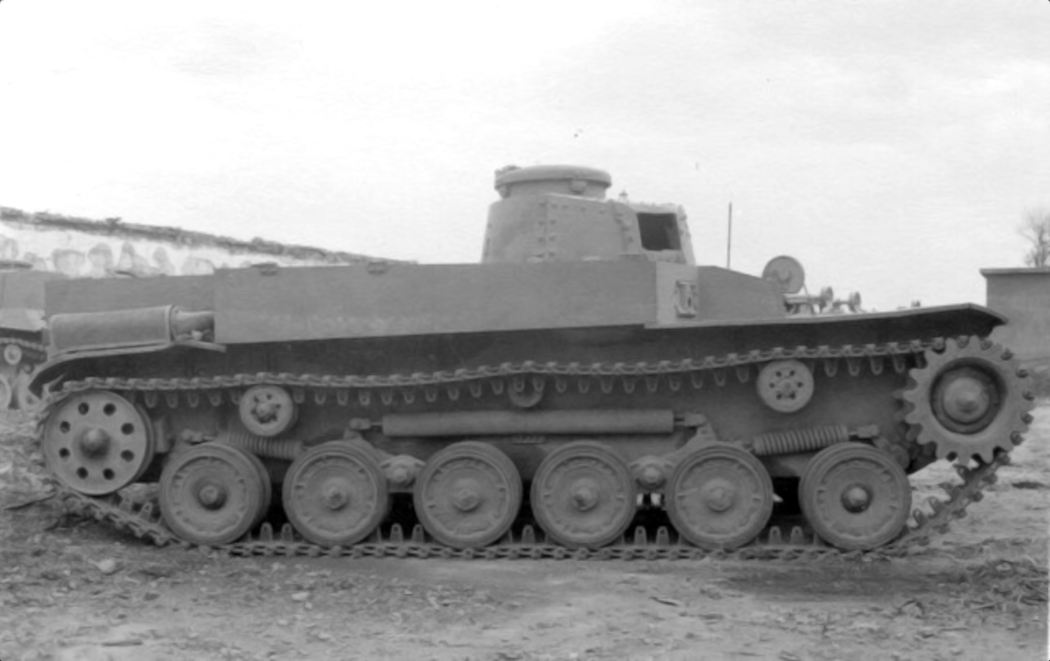
Type 97 experimental flamethrower tank number 2

- Type 97 experimental flamethrower tank number 2

Type 97 chassis fitted with two large, elongated fuel tanks and two flamethrowers on each side of the hull. It utilized an electric flame igniter system. Not such is known about this prototype, but a U.S. military chemical weapons report with photos was produced after examination of the vehicle. An earlier version of the Type 97 experimental flamethrower tank (number 1) replaced the hull machine gun with a flamethrower.

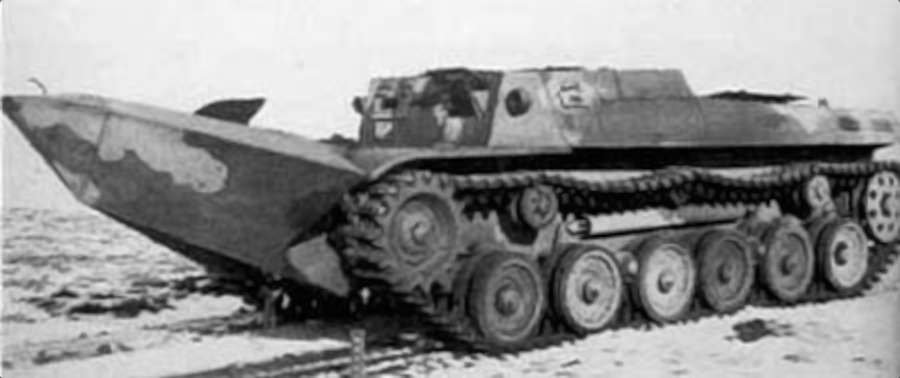
Ho-K armoured lumberjack vehicle

- Ho-K

An armoured lumberjack vehicle on a modified Type 97 ShinHōtō Chi-Ha chassis and a steel prow mounted for creating paths through forests. Used in Manchuria to aid the fight against the Soviet Union. One group was sent to New Guinea for use in the construction of an airfield there.

- Lumber sweeper Basso-Ki

A lumberjack vehicle on a modified Type 97 chassis. It was used to remove severed trees and stumps generated by the work of the Ho-K.

- Shi-Ki

Command tank on a Type 97 chassis. It had a machine gun in the turret and a 37 mm gun on the hull. Recognized by its different sized turret with the rail-antenna, it had long-range communications and superior optics. "Mainly" used at the tank training schools.

- Ka-So

Command tank to replace the older Type 97 Shi-Ki. It was based on the Type 1 Chi-He and had additional radios inside its turret. A wood dummy main gun was placed in the turret so the tank did not stand out from other tanks.

- Type T-G bridge layer

Type 97 with the turret removed; equipped with rollers, which support the "bridging span carrier" over the top of the chassis.

- Experimental anti-aircraft tank Ta-Ha

A planned anti-aircraft tank based on the Type 1 Chi-He chassis in 1944. The design called for the tank turret to be replaced by a rotatably mounted anti-aircraft gun in a twin mount behind a gun shield. One prototype tank was under construction at the end of the war.
