= F B swamp vehicle =

Type of vehicle

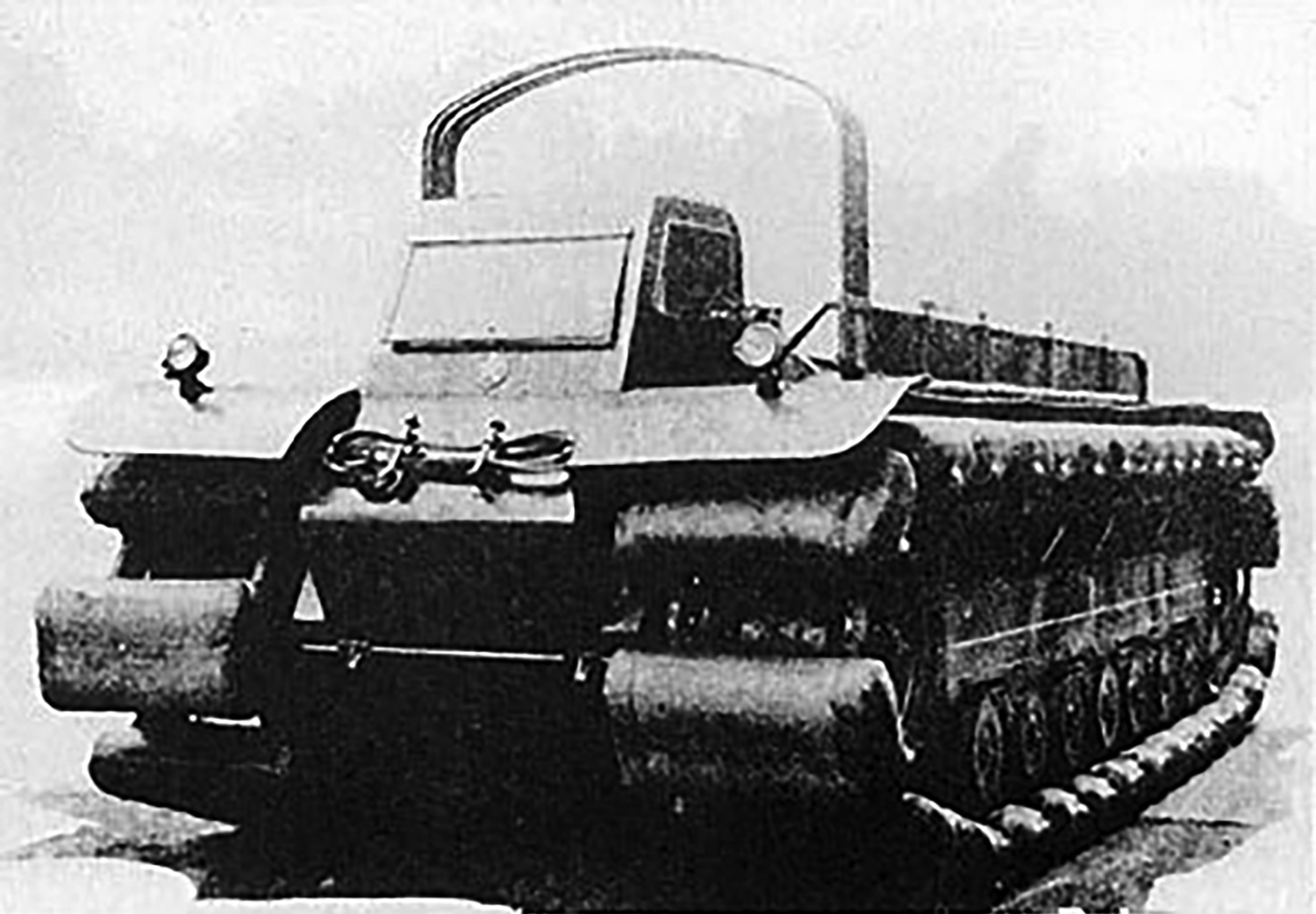
- Place of origin: Empire of Japan

Specifications
- Mass: 4.5 tons
- Length: 6.90m
- Width: 2.80m
- Height: 2.20m
- Crew: 2 or 3
- Armor: -
- Engine: diesel 100PS
- Maximum speed: (Ground) 30 km/h, (water) 8.5 km/h (mud) 15.0 km/h

The F B was an Imperial Japanese Army (IJA) military transport/personnel carrier used for crossing difficult swampy terrain. It was part of a series of vehicles developed by the army in its effort to mechanize and give mobility to their forces. A prior prototype known as the S B swamp vehicle was built in 1933, but it proved to be too heavy and cumbersome for its designed use. First produced in 1935, the F B was shorter and lighter than the S B prototype. A total of 146 F B units were built, making it the most numerous model produced of this type of vehicle by the Japanese Army. Subsequent to the F B, a smaller craft known as the T B swamp scout vehicle was produced.

== Development ==
The F B swamp vehicle was a military transport/personnel carrier of the Imperial Japanese Army (IJA), which was developed and used for crossing swampy terrain. It was part of the effort by the army to mechanize their forces and its "cross-country capabilities". The F B was first produced in 1935, with 146 units being built. The F B had a two-to-three-man crew. The vehicle had eight road wheels per side, with rubber floats attached to the track links in order to prevent the vehicle from sinking into the quagmire. The F B could also be used to transport men across water ways, powered by a drive propeller shaft.

== Prior S B swamp vehicle prototype ==
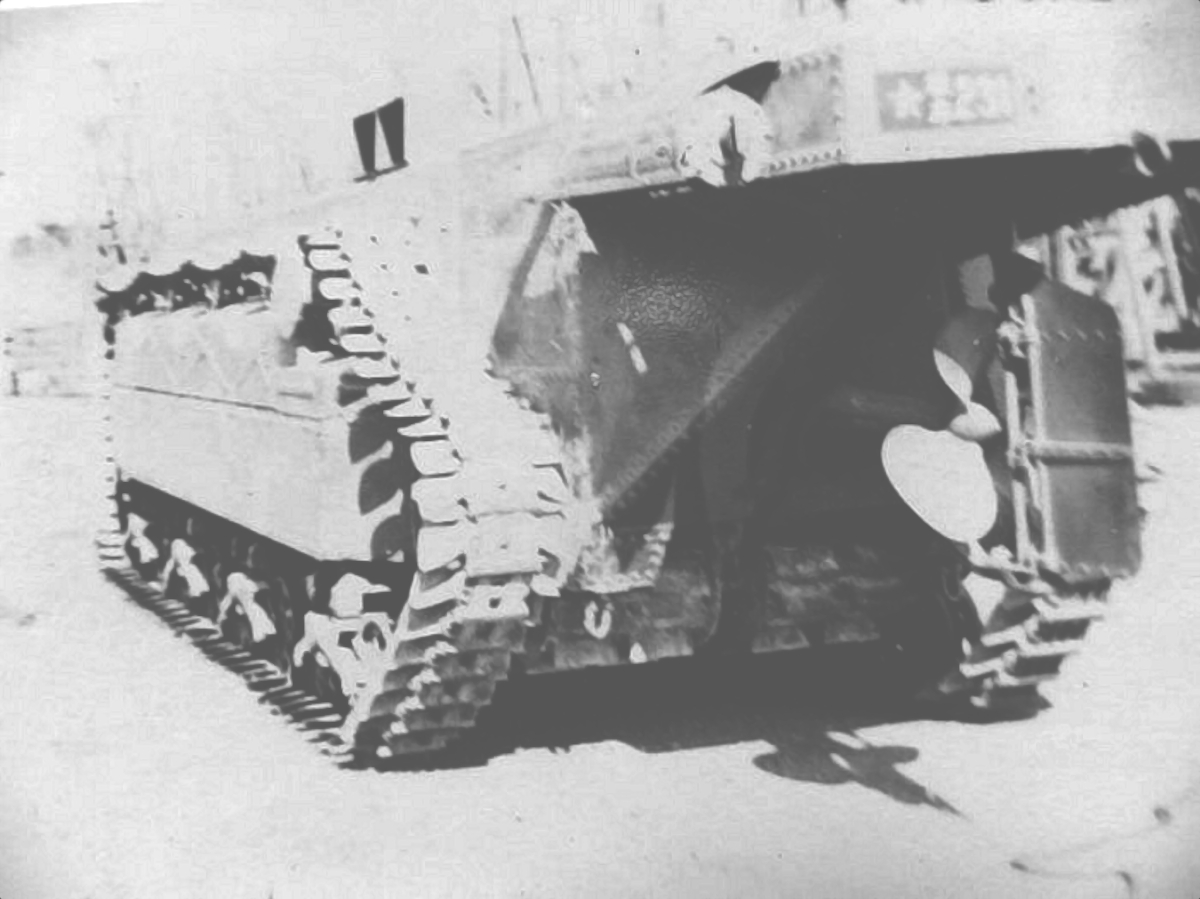
Rear-angle view of S B

The S B swamp vehicle was the first prototype design built by the IJA for use as a military transport/personnel carrier for crossing swampy terrain and waterways. It was also designed to transport men across waterways, powered by a drive propeller shaft. Built in 1933, like the subsequent F B vehicle it had rubber floats attached to its track links to prevent it from sinking in the mire. It differed from the FB design in having "fins at the track links" and additional tracks under the hull. However, it did not go into production as it was deemed too heavy at 10 tons and too long at 10m. The F B Swamp Vehicle was developed thereafter to address these issues encountered during testing.

== T B swamp scout vehicle ==
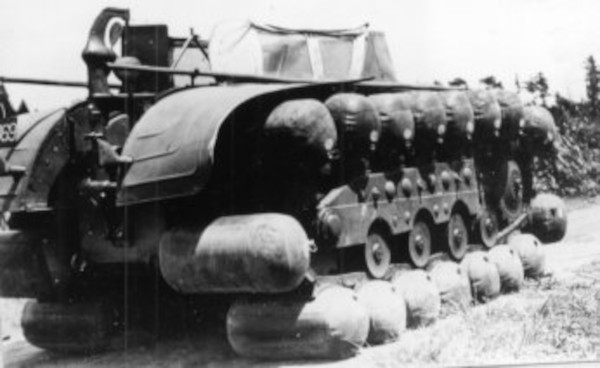
T B swamp scout vehicle

Subsequent to the F B, a smaller swamp-crossing vehicle was produced in 1942, which was known as the T B swamp scout vehicle. The track links had rubber floats attached to them in order to prevent the vehicle from sinking in the mire. The vehicle had a two-to-three-man crew and weighed 1.8 tons. It was powered by a 25 hp gasoline engine. A total of 53 were produced.
