= Sōkō Sagyō Ki =

- Close-up of a Sōkō Sagyō Ki
- Type: Military engineering vehicle Flamethrower tank
- Place of origin: Empire of Japan

Service history
- In service: 1935–1945
- Used by: Imperial Japanese Army
- Wars: Soviet–Japanese border conflicts Second Sino-Japanese War; World War II

Production history
- Designed: 1931
- Produced: 1931–1943
- No. built: 119
- Variants: 5

Specifications
- Mass: 13 tons
- Length: 4.865 m
- Width: 2.52 m
- Height: 2.088 m
- Crew: 5
- Armor: 6-25 mm maximum
- Main armament: 3 to 5 flamethrowers
- Secondary armament: 1 machine gun
- Engine: Mitsubishi I6 diesel engine 145 hp at 1,800 rpm
- Transmission: mechanical
- Maximum speed: 37 km/h

The Sōkō Sagyō Ki (装甲作業機, lit. "armoured work vehicle"), also known as the SS-Ki (SS機/SS器), was a fulltrack engineering vehicle of the Imperial Japanese Army (IJA) introduced in 1931. The vehicle was considered by the IJA to be one of its most versatile multi-function support vehicles.

== History ==
During the 1930s, the Imperial Japanese Army required a specialised vehicle in preparation for war against the Soviet Union, which would be capable of destroying Soviet fortified positions along the Manchurian border. During the development and planning, it was decided that its capabilities should include: destruction of pillboxes, trench digging, mine clearing, barbed wire cutting, smoke discharge, mass decontamination, chemical weapons employment, use as a crane vehicle, as a flamethrower tank and as a bridgelayer.

The first prototype was built in 1931. Following testing, the Imperial Japanese Army ordered several vehicles, with the first four assigned to the 1st Mixed Tank Brigade sent to China. During the Battle of Beiping–Tianjin in 1937, the vehicles were used as flamethrower tanks; however, for later battles the vehicles were exclusively used as engineering vehicles. They were eventually sent to the Soviet-Manchurian border within a combat engineer regiment.

During December 1941, approximately 20 SS-Ki vehicles were transferred to the Philippines as part of the engineer unit of the 2nd Tank Division. Eight SS-Ki vehicles were captured there by the United States military in the Battle of Luzon in 1945, which classified the vehicles as flamethrower tanks.

== Design ==
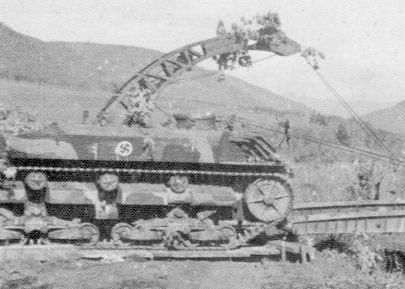
SS-Ki of the 5th Independent Engineer Regiment using its crane

The design used the Type 89 I-Go medium tank chassis and hull and a few of its parts. It also featured other parts from various mass-production vehicles. The suspension was made from two blocks of four roadwheels with two return rollers and no independent forward bogie, in addition to semi-elliptical leaf springs. The steering sprocket was placed within the front of the vehicle, whilst the drive sprocket was placed within the rear.

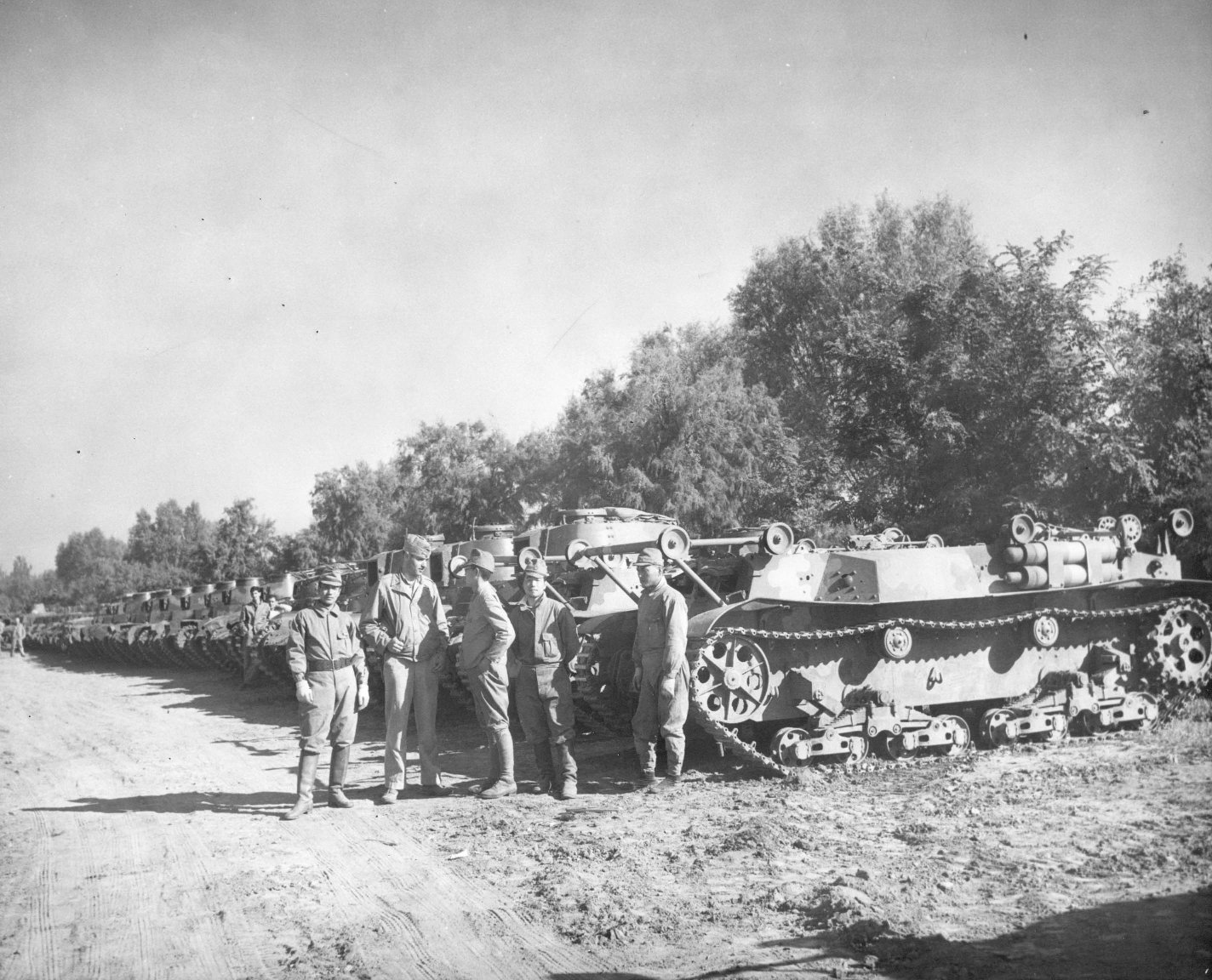
A Sōkō Sagyō Ki (frontmost) amongst a Japanese tank unit after surrender in Tianjin, with its external parts dismantled

The turret was removed and replaced with a small commander cupola with fitted observational devices; two large claws used for mine clearing were placed in the front, while a winch designed to pull heavy objects was placed in the rear, and was directly powered by the engine. In addition, the chassis had a "tow coupling". The thickness of the armor was reduced to 6mm on the roof and bottom, 13mm at the sides, and 25mm at the front hull, since the vehicle was not intended for combat at the front lines. The vehicle weighed 13 tons and accommodated five crewmembers.

The SS-Ki was powered by a Mitsubishi I6 diesel engine, which provided 145 horsepower at 1800 rpm, allowing the vehicle to travel at a top speed of 37 km/h; this was in conjunction with a mechanical transmission.

== Variants ==
Until 1943, 119 vehicles were built with the following variants:

- SS Ko Gata (甲型): Armored engineering vehicle with suspension tracks consisting of four return rollers. These were equipped with folded bridge, crane arm and three flamethrowers with external tanks. Thirteen were produced.
- SS Otsu Gata (乙型): Armored bridgelaying vehicle with three return rollers and modified drive sprockets. These were equipped with folded bridge, twin mine rake arms, and three flamethrowers with external tanks. Eight were produced.
- SS Hei Gata (丙型): Armored trench digger with identical suspension as the Otsu Gata, with additional armor plates. it was equipped with folded bridge, twin mine rake arms, and three flamethrowers with external tanks. One was produced.
- SS Tei Gata (丁型): Armored engineering vehicle with identical suspension as the Otsu Gata. These were equipped with folded bridge, single arm mine rake and three flamethrowers with external tanks. Twenty were produced.
- SS Bo Gata (戊型): Armored bridgelaying vehicle based on the design of the SS Ki. These were equipped with a catapult bridge, single arm mine rake, and five flamethrowers with internal tanks. Seventy-seven were produced.
