= Bellcrank =

Type of crank that changes motion through an angle

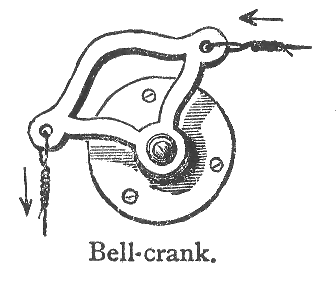
Illustration of a bellcrank from the 1908 Chambers's Twentieth Century Dictionary

A bellcrank is a type of crank that changes motion through an angle. The angle can range from 0 to 360 degrees, but 90-degree and 180-degree bellcranks are most common.

The name comes from its first use, changing the vertical pull on a rope to a horizontal pull on the striker of a bell to sound it.

== Design ==
A typical 90-degree bellcrank consists of an L-shaped crank pivoted where the two arms of the L meet. Moving rods or cables are attached to the outer ends of the L. When one is pulled, the L rotates around the pivot point, pulling on the other rod.

A typical 180-degree bellcrank consists of a straight bar that pivots at or near its center. When one rod is pulled or pushed, the bar rotates around the pivot point, pulling or pushing on the other rod.

Changing the length of the bellcrank's arms changes the mechanical advantage of the system. Many applications do not change the direction of motion but instead amplify a force "in line", which a bellcrank can do in a limited space. There is a tradeoff between range of motion, linearity of motion, and size. The greater the angle traversed by the crank, the more the motion ratio changes, and the more non-linear the motion becomes.

== Applications ==
=== Aircraft ===
Bellcranks are often used in aircraft flight control systems to connect the pilot's controls to the control surfaces. For example, on light aircraft, the rudder often has a bellcrank (also called a control horn) whose pivot point is the rudder hinge. A cable connects one of the pilot's rudder pedals to one side of the bellcrank. When the pilot pushes the rudder pedal, the cable pulls the bellcrank, causing the rudder to rotate. The opposite rudder pedal is connected to the other end of the bellcrank to rotate the rudder in the opposite direction.

Bellcranks are also used with model aircraft to transmit forces between control cables and flight surfaces.

=== Architectural ===
Bellcrank lever mechanisms were installed at the tops of entryway stairs in multi-storey and multi-unit Victorian and Edwardian homes (c. 1890 to 1930), particularly in the San Francisco Bay Area, to allow residents to open and close the front doors remotely so they would not need to walk down the stairs to welcome guests.

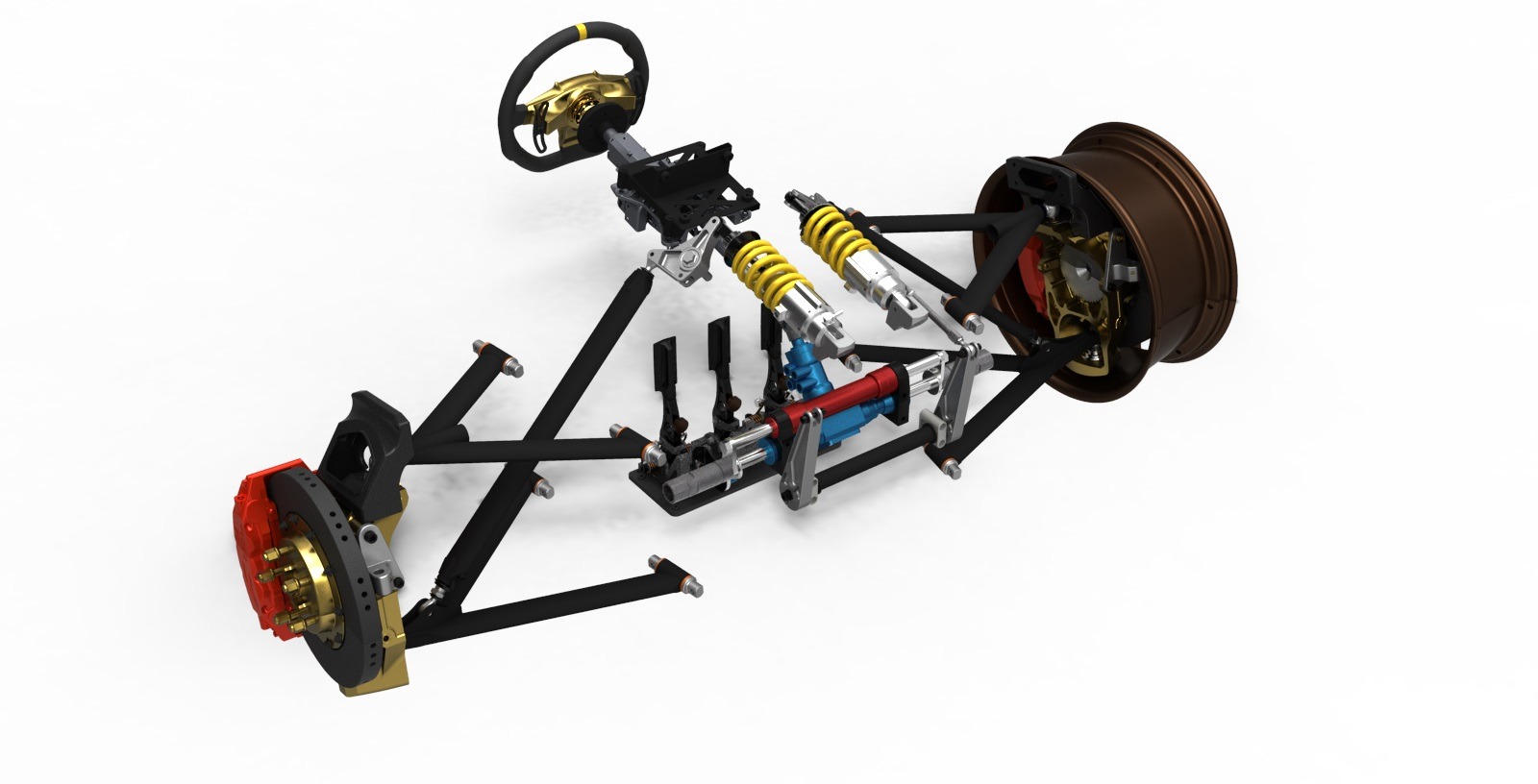
Front suspension system of the Tramontana, with bellcranks coupling suspension pushrods to coilovers

=== Automotive ===
Bellcranks are also seen in automotive applications, such as in the linkage connecting the throttle pedal to the carburetor or connecting the brake pedal to the master cylinder.

In vehicle suspensions, bellcranks are used in pullrod and pushrod suspensions in cars or in the Christie suspension in tanks. More vertical suspension designs such as MacPherson struts may not be feasible in some vehicle designs due to space, aerodynamic, or other design constraints; bellcranks translate the vertical motion of the wheel into horizontal motion, allowing the suspension to be mounted transversely or longitudinally within the vehicle.

=== Bicycles ===
Bellcranks are used in some internally geared hub assemblies to select gears. The motion from a Bowden cable is translated by a bellcrank to a push rod, which selects which portion of the epicyclic gears are driven by the bicycle's rear sprocket.
