= List of Japanese military equipment of World War II =

The following is a list of Japanese military equipment of World War II which includes artillery, vehicles and vessels, and other support equipment of both the Imperial Japanese Army (IJA), and Imperial Japanese Navy (IJN) from operations conducted from start of Second Sino-Japanese War in 1937 to the end of World War II in 1945.

The Empire of Japan forces conducted operations over a variety of geographical areas and climates from the frozen North of China bordering Russia during the Battle of Khalkin Gol (Nomonhan) to the tropical jungles of Indonesia. Japanese military equipment was researched and developed along two separate procurement processes, one for the IJA and one for the IJN. Until 1943, the IJN usually received a greater budget allocation, which allowed for the enormous Yamato-class battleships, advanced aircraft such as the Mitsubishi A6M "Zero" series, and the world's largest submarines. In addition, the IJN was given a higher priority as to the allocation of steel and raw materials for warship construction and airplane construction. It changed to a degree in 1944/45, when the Japanese home islands became increasingly under direct threat, but it was too late. Therefore, during the prior years the Imperial Japanese Army suffered by having a lower budget allocation and being given a lower priority as to raw materials, which eventually affected its use of equipment and tactics in engagements during World War II.

A majority of the materials used were cotton, wool, and silk for the fabrics, wood for weapon stocks, leather for ammunition pouches, belts, etc. But by 1943 material shortages caused much of the leather to be switched to cotton straps as a substitute.

== Swords and bayonets ==
Model	Type	Role	Blade length (cm)	From (year)	Notes
Guntō	Ceremonial sword	Ceremonial purpose/Close combat	variable	1875	Collective term for military swords
Type 30 bayonet	Combat knife/bayonet	Close combat	40	1897	Fitted on rifles from Type 30 to Type 99
Type 4 bayonet	Combat knife/bayonet	Close combat	?	1911	Integrated with Type 44 Cavalry Carbine
Type 2 bayonet	Combat knife/bayonet	Close combat	19.5	1942	Fitted on Type 2 TERA Rifle and Type 100 SMG
Pole bayonet	Combat knife/bayonet	Close combat	38.6	1945	Last-ditch weapon
Bamboo Spear	Spear	Close combat	170-200	As late as 1942-1945	Primary weapon when low on supplies

== Small arms ==
=== Pistols and Revolvers (manual and semi-automatic) ===
General sources:
Image	Name	Type	Role/s	Action	Origin	Base model/s	Manufacturer/s	Cartridge/s	Effective firing range (m)	From (year)	Estimated wartime quantity	Unloaded wt (kg)	Notes
	Type 26 revolver	Revolver	Sidearm	Double-action	Empire of Japan		Koishikawa Arsenal	9×22mmR Type 26	100	1893	~59,900	0.880	
	Type 94 8mm Nambu pistol	Pistol	Sidearm	Recoil operated, locked breech	Empire of Japan		Nambu	8x22mm Nambu	50–100	1935	~71,000	0.765	
	Type A 8 mm Nambu pistol	Pistol	Sidearm	Recoil operated, locked breech	Empire of Japan	Type 94 8mm Nambu pistol	Nambu	8×22mm Nambu	50	1903	~10,300	0.900	
	Type 14 8 mm Nambu pistol	Pistol	Sidearm	Recoil operated	Empire of Japan	Type A 8 mm Nambu pistol	Nambu	8×22mm Nambu	50	1925	~400,000	0.900	Reduced-cost version of Type A
-	Nambu Type 19 "North China" pistol	Pistol	Sidearm	Short recoil, locked breech	Empire of Japan	Type 14 8 mm Nambu pistol	Nambu	8×22mm Nambu		1944	~100	1.106	Reliability improvements of Type 14, occupied Chinese production
-	Type B 7 mm Nambu pistol	Pistol	Sidearm	Short recoil, locked breech	Empire of Japan	Type A 8 mm Nambu pistol	Nambu	7×20mm Nambu		1909	~6,000	0.650	3/4 size of Type A
-	Hino–Komuro pistol	Pistol	Sidearm	Blow-forward	Empire of Japan		Komuro	8×22mm Nambu.25 ACP.32 ACP		1908	~1,200	?	
	Sugiura pistol	Pistol	Sidearm	Blow-back	Empire of Japan	Colt M1903	Sugiura	8×22mm Nambu.25 ACP.32 ACP		1945	~6,000	?	Occupied Chinese production
-	Inagaki pistol	Pistol	Sidearm	Blow-back	Empire of Japan		Koishikawa Arsenal	8×22mm Nambu.32 ACP		1941	~50	?	
	Hamada Type pistol	Pistol	Sidearm	Recoil operated, locked breech	Empire of Japan	FN Model 1910	Nippon Firearms	8×22mm Nambu.32 ACP		1941	~5,000 (Type I); ~1500+2500 unassembled (Type II)	0.650	
	Smith & Wesson Model 3	Revolver	Sidearm	Single-action	United States of America		Smith & Wesson	.44 Russian.44 S&W American.38 S&W.44 Henry.44-40 Winchester.45 S&W.32 S&W		1870	?	1.300	
	Colt Model 1903 Pocket Hammerless	Pistol	Sidearm	Single-action blow-back	United States of America		Colt Patent Firearms	.32 ACP.380 ACP		1903	?	0.680	

=== Automatic pistols and submachine guns ===
Name	Type	Role/s	Action	Origin	Base model/s	Manufacturer/s	Cartridge/s	Effective firing range (m)	Cyclic rate of fire (round/min)	From (year)	Estimated wartime quantity	Unloaded mass (kg)	Notes
Type 100 SMG	Submachine gun	Close-quarters	Blow-back	Empire of Japan	MP34	Nambu	8×22mm Nambu	150	450–800	1939	~10,000~	3.70	
Model 1 submachine gun	Submachine gun	Close-quarters	Blow-back	Empire of Japan		Nambu	8×22mm Nambu		800	1935	?	3.37	
Model 2 submachine gun	Submachine gun	Close-quarters	Blow-back	Empire of Japan		Nambu	8×22mm Nambu	500	800	1935	120-200	3.37	
Mauser C96 (Type MO Large pistol)	Machine pistol	Close-quarters / Sidearm	Short recoil	German Empire		Mauser	7.63×25mm Mauser	150-200	900–1000 (M712 Schnellfeuer)	1896	?	1.130	
Type Be	Submachine gun	Close-quarters	Open-bolt blow-back	Switzerland	MP18	Schweizerische Industrie Gesellschaft	7.63×25mm Mauser	100		1920	~445~	4.18	Designation for the Swiss SIG M1920. Used in limited numbers by the Special Naval Landing Forces.
Type Su	Submachine gun	Close-quarters	Open-bolt blow-back	Austria	S1-100	Steyr-Solothurn A.G.	7.63×25mm Mauser	200	600	1929	~6,000~	4.48	Used in limited numbers by the Special Naval Landing Forces in Shanghai and Hainan Island.

=== Rifles ===
Tree chart of Japanese rifles of World War II

Type 30 rifle
Type 35 rifle	Type 30 carbine	Export variants or licensed copies, e.g. Manchu Arisaka.
Type I Rifle (Kingdom of Italy)	Type 38 rifle
Type 38 short rifle	Type 38 carbine	Export variants or licensed copies, e.g. Estonian KL .303, Mexican Model 1913, Siamese Type 66, Thai Type 83, etc.
M1 Garand (United States)	Pedersen rifle (United States)	Type 44 carbine
Type 97 sniper rifle	Type 1 TERA rifle	Type Mo rifle I, II (Karabiner 98k) (Nazi Germany)
Experimental Type 4 rifle	Experimental Type Hei Rifle	Type 99 rifle	Type 100 TERA rifle	Type Mo rifle III (vz. 24) (Czechoslovakia)
Type 99 long rifle	Type 99 sniper rifle	Type 2 TERA rifle

Name	Type	Role/s	Action	Origin	Base model/s	Manufacturer/s	Cartridge/s	Effective firing range (m)	From (year)	Estimated wartime quantity	Unloaded weight (kg)	Notes
Type 30 rifle	Standard rifle	Front-line	Bolt-action	Empire of Japan		Arisaka	6.5×50mm Arisaka	450	1897	~599,000	3.95	Limited distribution in 1945
Type 35 rifle	Standard rifle	Front-line	Bolt-action	Empire of Japan		Arisaka	6.5×50mm Arisaka		1902	~38,200	4.20	
Type 38 rifle	Standard rifle	Front-line	Bolt-action	Empire of Japan		Arisaka	6.5×50mm Arisaka	457	1905	~3,400,000	3.95	
Type 38 carbine	Carbine	Close-quarters	Bolt-action	Empire of Japan	Type 38	Arisaka	6.5×50mm Arisaka	366	1905	~517,800	3.30	Main armament of IJA auxiliary troops
Type 44 carbine	Carbine	Close-quarters	Bolt-action	Empire of Japan	Type 38	Arisaka	6.5×50mm Arisaka	366	1911	~91,900	3.30	Foldable
Type 97 sniper rifle	Sniper rifle	Long-Range Precision	Bolt-action	Empire of Japan	Type 38	Arisaka	6.5×50mm Arisaka	1,500	1937	~22,500	3.95	2.5x telescopic sight
Type 99 (short) rifle	Standard rifle	Front-line	Bolt-action	Empire of Japan		Arisaka	7.7×58mm Arisaka	656	1939	~3,500,000	3.70	Intended to replace Type 38
Type 99 (long) rifle	Standard rifle	Front-line	Bolt-action	Empire of Japan		Arisaka	7.7×58mm Arisaka	656	1939	~38,000	4.09	
Type 2 TERA rifle	Takedown rifle	Front-line / Close-quarters	Bolt-action	Empire of Japan	Type 99	Nagoya	7.7×58mm Arisaka		1943	~21,200	3.70	Takedown variant for paratroopers
Type 99 sniper rifle	Sniper rifle	Long-Range Precision	Bolt-action	Empire of Japan	Type 99	Arisaka	7.7×58mm Arisaka	1,700	1939	~8,000	3.70	2.5x or 4x telescopic sight
Type 100 TERA rifle	Takedown rifle	Front-line / Close-quarters	Bolt-action	Empire of Japan	Karabiner 98k	unknown	7.7×58mm Arisaka		1940	~500	3.90	Experimental, detachable barrel for paratroopers
Type 1 TERA rifle	Takedown rifle	Front-line / Close-quarters	Bolt-action	Empire of Japan	Type 38 carbine	Nagoya	6.5×50mm Arisaka		1941	~250	3.30	Experimental, foldable for paratroopers
Type Hei Rifle	Battle rifle	Front-line / Assault	Gas-operated, toggle-action	Empire of Japan		Nippon	6.5×50mm Arisaka		1935	~50	3.90	Experimental
Type 4 rifle / Type 5 Rifle	Battle rifle	Front-line / Assault	Gas-operated, rotating bolt	Empire of Japan	M1 Garand	Yokosuka	7.7×58mm Arisaka	457	1945	~250	4.14	Experimental
Karabiner 98k (Type Mo rifle I, II)	Standard rifle	Front-line	Bolt-action	Nazi Germany		Mauser	7.92×57mm Mauser	500	1937	~20,000	3.90	Imported, version I for infantry and II for cavalry
vz. 24 (Type Mo rifle III)	Standard rifle	Front-line	Bolt-action	Czechoslovakia	Karabiner 98AZ	Považská Bystrica	7.92×57mm Mauser		1937	~40,000	4.20	Imported, for both infantry and cavalry
Type I rifle	Standard rifle	Front-line	Bolt-action	Kingdom of Italy	Type 38	Carcano	6.5×50mm Arisaka		1939	~120,000	3.95	Built in Italy under contract to Type 38 specification

=== Grenades and grenade launchers ===
Grenade	Launcher	From (year)	Type	Filling	Mass (kg)	Notes
Type 10 grenade	Type 10	1914	Fragmentation	TNT	0.530	Inaccurate fuse timing
Type 91 grenade	Type 89	1931	Fragmentation	TNT	0.530	Improvement of Type 10
Type 92 grenade	Type 10	1933	Chemical	TNT	0.590	Green (skin irritant) and red (tear gas) versions, 30g bursting and 37-40g chemical charges
Type 97 grenade	No	1937	Fragmentation	TNT	0.450	Evolution of Type 91 optimized for hand-throw
Type 98 grenade	No	1939	Fragmentation	Cast picric acid	0.595	Copy of Model 24 grenade, long handle
Type 99 grenade	Type 100	1939	Fragmentation	Cast picric acid	0.300	Variant of Type 97 for grenade launcher
Type 2 grenade (30mm)	Type 2	1942	Anti-tank	50% TNT, 50% RDX	0.230	
Type 2 grenade (40mm)	Type 2	1942	Anti-tank	50% TNT, 50% RDX	0.369	98mm RHA penetration
Type 3 grenade	No	1943	Anti-tank	50% TNT, 50% PETN	0.830-1.270	Shaped charge, fabric body
Type 4 grenade	No	1944	Fragmentation	Ammonium perchlorate explosive	0.480	Ceramic (Pottery) grenade

=== Flare guns ===
Name	Type	Role/s	Origin	Base model/s	Manufacturer/s	Cartridge/s	From (year)	Estimated wartime quantity	Unloaded mass (kg)	Notes
Type 10 signal pistol (35 mm)	Flare gun	Distress call / sidearm	Empire of Japan		Koishikawa Arsenal; Kokura Arsenal		1921	?		

=== Recoilless rifles ===
Name	Type	Role/s	Origin	Base model/s	Manufacturer/s	Cartridge/s	From (year)	Estimated wartime quantity	Unloaded mass (kg)	Notes
Type 4 70 mm AT rocket launcher	rocket launcher	Anti-tank / Anti-material / Breaching	Empire of Japan			72x359mm	1944	~3,500	8	
Type 5 45 mm AT rocket launcher	rocket launcher	Anti-tank / Anti-material / Breaching	Empire of Japan					?		
81mm recoilless rifle	rocket launcher	Anti-tank / Anti-material / Breaching	Empire of Japan					?		300 produced in 1944 and used up in battle for Okinawa
10.5 cm recoilless rifle	rocket launcher	Anti-tank / Anti-material / Breaching	Empire of Japan					?		

=== Flamethrowers ===
Name	Type	Role/s	Origin	Base model/s	Manufacturer/s	From (year)	Estimated wartime quantity	Mass (kg)	Notes
Type 93 flamethrowers	Flamethrower	Specialized role	Empire of Japan			1933	?	26 + 4.5	
Type 100 flamethrowers	Flamethrower	Specialized role	Empire of Japan			1940	?	26 + 4	

== Machine guns ==
=== Infantry and dual-purpose machine guns ===
Name	Type	Role/s	Action	Origin	Base model/s	Manufacturer/s	Cartridge/s	Effective firing range (m)	Cyclic rate of fire (round/min)	From (year)	Estimated wartime quantity	Unloaded mass (kg)	Note/s
Type 11 light machine gun	Light machine gun	Fire support / suppression / defence	Gas-operated	Empire of Japan	Hotchkiss M1909 Benét–Mercié	Nambu	6.5×50mm Arisaka	800	500	1922	~29,000 (Pacific Theater)	10.2	
Type 89 flexible	Light machine gun	Fire support / suppression / defence	Gas-operated	Empire of Japan	Type 11 light machine gun	Nambu	7.7x58mmSR Type 89		1,400	1929	?	28	Twin Type 11
Type 89 (special)	Light machine gun	Fire support / suppression / defence	Gas-operated	Empire of Japan	Type 89 flexible	Nambu	7.7x58mmSR Type 89		1,400	1929	?	28	Belt-fed version of Type 89 flexible
Type 89 (modified single)	Light machine gun	Fire support / suppression / defence	Gas-operated	Empire of Japan	Type 89 (special)	Nambu	7.7x58mmSR Type 89		670	1938	?	9.3	Single-barrel version of Type 89 (special) to reduce weight
Type 96 light machine gun	Light machine gun	Fire support / suppression / defence	Gas-operated	Empire of Japan	Zb-26	Nambu	6.5x50mm Arisaka	800	550	1936	41,000~ (Pacific Theater)	9	
Type 97 light machine gun	Light machine gun	Fire support / suppression / defence	Gas-operated	Empire of Japan	Type 96 light machine gun	Nagoya	7.7x58mm Arisaka	540	500	1937	18,000~ (Pacific Theater)	12.4	7.7 mm version of Type 96, widely used on Japanese tanks
Type 99 light machine gun	Light machine gun	Fire support / suppression / defence	Gas-operated	Empire of Japan	Type 97 light machine gun	Hitachi	7.7×58mm Arisaka; 7.62×54mmR (VPA converted)	2,000	800	1939	~53,000 (Pacific Theater)	10.4	Reliability improvements of Type 96/97 (7.7 mm)
Type 21 light machine gun	Light machine gun	Fire support / suppression / defence	Gas-operated	Empire of Japan							?		
Type 3 heavy machine gun	Heavy machine gun	Anti-aircraft / Airspace denial / Fire support / suppression / defence	Gas-operated	Empire of Japan	Hotchkiss M1914	Nambu	6.5x50mm Arisaka; 7×57mm Mauser	1700	400–450	1914	?	55	Also known as 6.5mm Taishō 14 machine gun
Type 92 heavy machine gun	Heavy machine gun	Anti-aircraft / Airspace denial / Fire support / suppression / defence	Gas-operated	Empire of Japan	Type 3 heavy machine gun	Nambu	7.7×58mm Type 92	800	450-500	1934	~45,000 (Pacific Theater)	55.3	7.7mm version of Type 3
Type 1 heavy machine gun	Heavy machine gun	Anti-aircraft / Airspace denial / Fire support / suppression / defence	Gas-operated	Empire of Japan	Type 92 heavy machine gun	Hitachi	7.7x58mm Arisaka	1,400	400–450	1941	?	36.8	Type 92 modified for weight reduction
Type 98 7.7mm water-cooled heavy machine gun	Heavy machine gun	Anti-aircraft / Airspace denial / Fire support / suppression / defence	Recoil-operated	Empire of Japan			7.7×58mm Type 92		500	1940	?	55.5	
Type 38 heavy machine gun	Heavy machine gun	Anti-aircraft / Airspace denial / Fire support / suppression / defence	Gas-operated	Empire of Japan							?		
Lewis gun (Type 92 machine gun)	Light machine gun	Fire support / suppression / defence	Gas-operated	United States			7.7x56R Type 87 IJN	800	600	1932	?	8.5	

=== Vehicle and aircraft machine guns ===
Name	Type	Action	Application/s	Origin	Base model/s	Manufacturer/s	Cartridge/s	From (year)	Unloaded mass (kg)	Note/s
Type 91 machine gun	Light machine gun	Gas-operated	Armoured fighting ground vehicles	Empire of Japan	Type 11 light machine gun		6.5×50mm Arisaka			Type 11 light machine gun modified for automotive use
Type 92 Automotive 13 mm cannon	Autocannon	Gas-operated	Armoured fighting ground vehicles	Empire of Japan			7.7×58mm Type 92	1932		
Type 97 aircraft machine gun	Light machine gun	Short recoil, toggle lock	Nakajima B6N, Yokosuka K5Y, Yokosuka D4Y, Aichi D3A, Aichi E16A, Kawanishi E7K, Kawanishi N1K and its land-based derivative, the N1K-J, Mitsubishi J2M, Mitsubishi F1M2, in addition to the Mitsubishi A6M Zero and its floatplane derivative, the Nakajima A6M2-N.	Empire of Japan	Type 89 FIXED		7.7x56mm R	1937		Modified Type 89 fixed
Type 4 heavy machine gun	Heavy machine gun	Recoil operated		Empire of Japan				1944		Experimental, tested in 1942–1944, but was not accepted by army until surrender of Japan
Ho-103 machine gun	Heavy machine gun	Recoil operated	Nakajima Ki-43; Nakajima Ki-44; Kawasaki Ki-45; Kawasaki Ki-61; Nakajima Ki-84; Kawasaki Ki-100; Mitsubishi Ki-51; Mitsubishi Ki-21; Mitsubishi Ki-67; Kawasaki Ki-48; and various others.	Empire of Japan	M1921 aircraft Browning machine gun		12.7×81mmSR Breda	1941		
Ho-203 cannon	Autocannon	Long recoil	Kawasaki Ki-45; Kawasaki Ki-102	Empire of Japan			37x112mmR	1940		
Ho-5 cannon	Autocannon	Short recoil	Kawasaki Ki-45; Kawasaki Ki-61; Nakajima Ki-84; Kawasaki Ki-100; Mitsubishi Ki-46; Kawasaki Ki-102; Mitsubishi Ki-67; and various others.	Empire of Japan	Ho-103 machine gun		20×94mm			
Type 99 cannon	Autocannon	API blowback	Kawanishi H6K; Kawanishi H8K; Kawanishi N1K; Mitsubishi A6M; Mitsubishi G3M; Mitsubishi G4M; Mitsubishi J2M; Nakajima J1N	Empire of Japan	Oerlikon FF		20×72mmRB	1937		Modified Oerlikon FF.
MG15 (Type 98 turret machine gun)	Light machine gun	Recoil operation	Kawasaki Ki-48; Nakajima Ki-49; Mitsubishi Ki-46; Kawasaki Ki-45; Nakajima C6N; Yokosuka D4Y; Nakajima B6N; and various others.	Weimar Republic			7.92×57mm Mauser	1940		Licensed production of MG15 7.62mm machine gun.
Vickers .303 (Type 89 fixed)	Light machine gun	Short recoil	Nakajima Ki-27, Ki-43, early Ki-44 fighters, the Mitsubishi Ki-30, Ki-51 light bombers, the Kawasaki Ki-32 light bomber and various others.	United Kingdom			7.7x58mmSR Type 89	1929	12.7	License-built Vickers .303 (7.7 mm).

=== Training light machine guns ===
Name	Type	Role/s	Action	Origin	Manufacturer/s	Cartridge/s	From (year)	Estimated wartime quantity	Unloaded mass (kg)	Note/s
Nambu-type training light machine gun	Training light machine gun	Training	Simple blowback	Empire of Japan	Nambu	6.5mm blanks	1920s			Blank-firing training light machine guns used paramilitary training in secondary school paramilitary training. Other variants existed, produced by various manufacturers.

== Artillery ==
=== Infantry mortars ===
- Type 89 grenade discharger, or 'knee mortar,' firing grenades or 50mm shells.
- Type 98 50 mm mortar
- Type 11 70 mm infantry mortar (rifled bore)
- Type 97 81 mm infantry mortar
- Type 99 81 mm mortar – fired by hammer strike
- Type 94 90 mm infantry mortar
  - Type 97 90 mm infantry mortar (simplified version of Type 94 90 mm infantry mortar)
- Type 2 12 cm mortar
- Type 90 light mortar – actually heavy 150mm mortar, 90 made and used in 1932
  - Type 96 150 mm infantry mortar
    - Type 97 150 mm infantry mortar (Type 96 150 mm infantry mortar with recoil absorber removed to save weight)

=== Heavy mortars & rocket launchers ===
- Type 14 27 cm heavy mortar
- Type 98 320 mm mortar
- Type 4 20 cm rocket launcher
- Type 3 300 mm heavy mortar on Type 4 Ha-To SP heavy mortar carrier
- Type 4 40 cm rocket launcher
- Type 5 mortar launcher "Tok"
- Type 10 and Type 3 rocket boosters

=== Field artillery ===
- 7cm mountain gun (75 mm caliber, short bronze barrel)
  - Type 31 75 mm mountain gun (steel version)
- 7 cm field gun (75mm caliber, long bronze barrel)
  - Type 31 75 mm field gun (steel version)
- Type 41 75 mm mountain gun (license-built Krupp M.08 mountain gun)
- Type 94 75 mm mountain gun (Japanese design to replace Type 41 75 mm mountain gun)
- Type 38 75 mm field gun (license-built Krupp gun)
  - Type 41 75 mm cavalry gun (Type 38 75 mm field gun lightened by about 30 kg in weight)
- Type 90 75 mm field gun (Japanese design to replace Type 38 75 mm field gun)
- Type 95 75 mm field gun (lighter weight gun to supersede the Type 90 75 mm field gun)
- Type 99 10 cm mountain gun
- Krupp 10.5 cm cannon (Krupp built gun imported from Germany)
  - Krupp 12 cm howitzer (Krupp built gun imported from Germany)
  - Krupp 15 cm howitzer (Krupp built gun imported from Germany)
  - Type 38 10 cm cannon (license-built Krupp 105mm howitzer M1905)
- Type 91 10 cm howitzer (Japanese design, light-weight howitzer to supplement Type 38 15 cm howitzer)
- Type 14 10 cm cannon (Japanese design, largely unsuccessful)
  - Type 92 10 cm cannon (replacement for Type 14 10 cm cannon)
- 120 mm Krupp howitzer M1905
- Type 38 12 cm howitzer (license-built 120 mm Krupp howitzer M1905)
- Type 38 15 cm howitzer (license-built 150 mm Krupp QF howitzer M1905)
  - Type 4 15 cm howitzer (changes of Type 38 15 cm howitzer to improve portability)
    - Type 96 15 cm howitzer (intended replacement of Type 4 15 cm howitzer and main howitzer used by heavy artillery units)

=== Fortress and siege guns ===
- Type 7 10 cm cannon (early production of Type 14 10 cm cannon)
- Type 45 15 cm coast defense gun (1912) – barbette-mounted coastal defense gun
  - Type 7 15 cm cannon
  - Type 89 15 cm cannon – main heavy gun of Imperial Japanese Army
  - Type 96 15 cm cannon – developed to have a gun with a longer range than the Type 89
- 28 cm howitzer L/10
  - Type 45 24 cm howitzer (1912) – replacement for 28 cm howitzer L/10
    - Type 45 20 cm howitzer (1912) – almost the same as the Type 45 24 cm howitzer, but for the caliber
  - Type 96 24 cm howitzer
- Type 90 24 cm railway gun – built in France
- Type 7 30 cm howitzer (1918) – semi-mobile siege gun
- Experimental 41 cm howitzer – largest Japanese gun produced

=== Infantry guns ===
- Type 11 37 mm infantry gun
- Type 92 70 mm infantry gun (Type 92 battalion gun)

=== Anti-tank guns ===
- Type Ra 37 mm anti-tank gun (German 3.7 cm Pak 36 captured from Chinese)
- Type 94 37 mm anti-tank gun
  - Type 1 37 mm anti-tank gun – same as Type 94 but with a longer barrel
- Type 97 47 mm anti-tank gun – a prototype tested in 1937–1938
  - Type 1 47 mm anti-tank gun
- Type 2 57 mm anti-tank gun – prototype tested in 1941–1943, cancelled because of the appearance of Allied heavy tanks.

== Anti-tank weapons (besides anti-tank guns) ==
- Type 97 automatic cannon
- Type 99 mine
- Type 93 pressure AT, personnel mine
- Type 2 rifle grenade launcher
- Type 3 AT grenade
- Lunge mine
- 57 mm tank cannon
- 37 mm tank cannon
- Type 5 45 mm recoilless gun
- Type 4 70 mm AT rocket launcher

== Anti-aircraft weapons ==
=== Occasional anti-aircraft guns ===
- Type 97 automatic cannon
- Type 11 light machine gun
- Type 96 light machine gun
- Type 99 light machine gun
- Type 92 heavy machine gun
- Type 1 heavy machine gun
- 37mm high elevation angle gun
- modified Type 38 75 mm field gun

=== Light anti-aircraft guns ===
- Type 3 heavy machine gun
- Type 4 heavy machine gun
- 13.2 mm Hotchkiss machine gun
  - Type 92 13mm automotive cannon – used in independent machine gun companies
- Type 98 20 mm AA machine cannon
  - Type 4 20 mm twin AA machine cannon
- Type 2 20 mm AA machine cannon
  - Type 2 20 mm twin AA machine cannon
- Type 96 25 mm AT/AA gun – main IJN gun, over 30,000 units produced
- 70/81mm AA mine discharger

=== Medium & heavy anti-aircraft guns ===
Name	Caliber (mm)	Eff. alt.	From (year)	Estimated quantity	Mass (kg)	Fire rate (RPM)	Note/s
QF 3.7-inch AA gun Mk1	94	7,300	1941	0	9,317	15	captured from British
Type 11	75	6,650	1922	44	2,061	~5	used as railroad gun and in home islands fortresses
Type 14	100	10,500	1925	70	5,194	~5	civil defense in Kyushu only
Type 10	120	10,065	1927	2,000	7,800	11	cheap coastal defense tool, dual-purpose
Type 88	75	7,250	1928	2,000	2,740	18	based on QF 3-inch 20 cwt design, mainstay of civil defense
Type 89 naval gun	127	9,439	1932	1,306	20,300	11	standard heavy AA gun of IJN
Type 99	88	10,420	1938	1,000	6,500	15	2nd most produced after Type 88 for civil defense
8 cm/40 3rd Year Type naval gun	76.2	5,400	1914	69	2,600	13	dual-purpose naval gun, during World War II used on gunboats and for civil air defense
Type 3 12cm	120	13,000	1944	120	19,800	20	the only mass-produced Japanese weapon effective against B-29
Type 4	75	10,000	1944	70	5,850	10	reverse-engineered Bofors gun captured from Chinese, intended to replace Type 88, modified as Type 5 75 mm Tank Gun
Type 5	149.1	16,000	1945	2	9,200	10	had a fire-control electronic computer

== Vehicles ==
=== Tankettes ===
- Carden Loyd Mk.VI
- Type 92 heavy armoured car (also known as Jyu-Sokosha Type 92 cavalry tank)
- Type 94 tankette "TK"
  - Type 97 Te-Ke – improvement of Type 94 "TK"
    - Type 97 Ki-To SPAAG self-propelled AA gun (armed with Type 98 20 mm AA machine cannon)
- Model 94 3/4 ton tracked trailer – towed by tankettes

=== Amphibious tanks ===
- Type 92 A-I-Go (experimental, modified hull of Type 92 heavy armoured car)
- Type 1 Mi-Sha (a/k/a Type 1 Ka-Mi) (experimental)
- Type 2 Ka-Mi (modified hull of Type 95 Ha-Go)
- Type 3 Ka-Chi (modified hull of Type 1 Chi-He)
- Type 5 To-Ku (modified hull of Type 5 Chi-Ri)

Note: Amphibious tanks were used by the IJN.

=== Tanks and related vehicles ===
- Tank Mk IV – British World War I vintage
- Medium Mark A Whippet – British World War I vintage
- Renault FT-17 "Ko" light tank – World War I vintage
- Renault NC27 "Otsu" light tank
- M3 light tank – captured
- Experimental tank – Number 1 (Type 87 Chi-I) 1st prototype leading to the Type 89 I-Go
- Type 89 I-Go medium tank
- Type 91 heavy tank – prototype leading to Type 95 heavy tank
  - Type 95 heavy tank – multi-turret tank; four prototypes completed
    - Hi-Ro Sha SPG – Type 95 heavy tank hull, 105 mm cannon
    - Ji-Ro SPG – Type 95 heavy tank hull, 105 mm cannon
- Type 95 Ha-Go (also known as Type 95 Ke-Go or Type 95 Kyu-Go)
  - Type 98 Ke-Ni (also known as Type 98 Chi-Ni) – replacement model light tank for the Type 95 Ha-Go
    - Type 2 Ke-To – variant of Type 98 Ke-Ni with improved 37 mm cannon
      - Type 2 Ke-To based work vehicle – prototype engineering vehicle with smaller, modified Type 2 Ke-To turret. Equipped with a generator, flood light and a light crane
      - Type 4 work vehicle – production engineering vehicle with Type 2 Ke-To hull. Equipped with a front end dozer blade, a generator and flood light
    - Type 98 Ta-Se – prototype 20 mm AA gun tank with Type 98 Ke-Ni hull
    - Type 98 20 mm AAG tank – prototype with Type 98 Ke-Ni hull and twin Type 2 20 mm AA machine cannon
    - Special number 3 light tank Ku-Ro – airborne light tank carried by glider Ku-6 (early development version known as So-Ra); prototype, mockup only
  - Type 3 Ke-Ri – Type 95 Ha-Go tank with 57 mm main gun. Prototype failed army trials in 1943
  - Type 4 Ke-Nu – Ha-Go hull with a 57 mm main gun in a Chi-Ha turret
  - Type 4 Ho-To SPG – prototype with a Ha-Go hull fitted with Type 38 12 cm howitzer
  - Type 5 Ho-Ru SPATG – prototype based on modified hull of the Ha-Go with a Type 1 47 mm tank gun
- Type 97 Chi-Ha – with Type 97 57 mm tank gun; the most advanced Japanese tank available in numbers at start of the Pacific War
  - Type 97 Shinhoto Chi-Ha – Chi-Ha hull with an enlarged turret and production model Type 1 47 mm tank gun
  - Type 1 Ho-Ni I SPG (tank destroyer) – Chi-Ha hull with Type 90 75 mm field gun
    - Type 1 Ho-Ni II SPG (tank destroyer) – Chi-Ha hull with Type 91 10 cm howitzer
    - Type 3 Ho-Ni III SPG (tank destroyer) – Chi-Ha hull with Type 3 75 mm tank gun, same as Type 3 Chi-Nu tank
  - Type 2 Ho-I Infantry support tank – Type 99 75 mm L/23 gun on hull of Chi-Ha
  - Type 4 Ho-Ro SPG – Chi-Ha hull with Type 38 15 cm howitzer
  - Type 3 Chi-Nu – improved Chi-Ha hull fitted with large new hexagonal turret with Type 3 75 mm tank gun
  - Short barrel 120 mm gun tank (1945) – 120 mm naval gun in a Type 97 Shinhoto Chi-Ha turret on a Chi-Ha hull, for infantry support
  - Long barrel 120 mm SPG (1945) – 120 mm naval gun on a Chi-Ha hull – prototype only
  - Type 5 Ho-Chi SPG – (design study), Chi-Ha hull fitted with a Type 96 15 cm howitzer
  - Type 1 Chi-He – major improvement of the Chi-Ha series with a more powerful engine, thicker armor and using the Type 1 47 mm tank gun
    - Ta-Ha SPAAG – (design study), Type 1 Chi-He hull with twin 37 mm anti-aircraft guns
- Type 98 Chi-Ho – prototype medium tank with an enlarged turret and the then "experimental" Type 1 47 mm tank gun
- O-I (1940), 100-ton tank (design study)
  - O-I (1943), 120-ton tank (unfinished prototype)
- Type 4 Chi-To (2 completed) – up-scaled Type 97 Shinhoto Chi-Ha with Type 5 75 mm tank gun
  - Type 5 Ka-To tank destroyer (unfinished prototype) – Extended Type 4 Chi-To hull fitted with a 105 mm cannon
- Type 5 Chi-Ri – (unfinished prototype) to be fitted with Type 5 75 mm tank gun and later to be up-gunned with an 88 mm main gun
  - Type 5 Ho-Ri tank destroyer (unfinished prototype) – Type 5 Chi-Ri hull fitted with a 105 mm cannon
- Type 5 Ke-Ho (prototype) – intended to be successor of Type 95 Ha-Go
- Type 5 Na-To (tank destroyer) – Type 5 75 mm tank gun on a chassis of a Type 4 Chi-So medium tracked carrier

=== Self-propelled guns ===
==== Tank-based ====
Name	Chassis	Gun	From (year)	Estimated quantity	Role/s
Ji-Ro	Type 95 heavy tank	10 cm	?	1	self-propelled anti-tank gun
Hi-Ro Sha	Type 95 heavy tank	10 cm	?	1	self-propelled anti-tank gun
Type 4 Ho-To	Type 95 Ha-Go	Type 38 12 cm howitzer	1944	1	SPG
Type 5 Ho-Ru	Type 95 Ha-Go	Type 1 47 mm anti-tank gun	1945	1	SP ATG
Type 1 Ho-Ni I	Type 97 Chi-Ha	Type 90 75 mm field gun	1941	26	SP ATG
Type 1 Ho-Ni II	Type 97 Chi-Ha	Type 91 10 cm howitzer	1941	54	SPG
Type 3 Ho-Ni III	Type 97 Chi-Ha	Type 3 75 mm tank gun	1943	31–41	SP ATG
Type 2 Ho-I	Type 97 Chi-Ha	Type 41 75 mm mountain gun	1942	31	SPG
Type 4 Ho-Ro	Type 97 Chi-Ha	Type 38 15 cm howitzer	1944	12	SPG
Short barrel 120 mm gun tank	Type 97 Chi-Ha	120 mm naval gun	1945	12	SPG
Type 5 Ho-Chi	Type 97 Chi-Ha	Type 96 15 cm howitzer	1945	1	SPG
Type 98 Ta-Se	Type 98 Ke-Ni	Type 98 20 mm AA machine cannon	1941	1	self-propelled anti-aircraft gun
Type 98 20 mm AAG tank	Type 98 Ke-Ni	twin Type 2 20 mm AA machine cannon	1944	1	self-propelled anti-aircraft gun
Ta-Ha	Type 1 Chi-He	twin 37 mm high-angle gun	1942	0	self-propelled anti-aircraft gun
Type 5 Na-To	Type 4 Chi-So medium tracked carrier	Type 5 75 mm tank gun	1945	2	SP ATG
Type 5 Ho-Ri	Type 5 Chi-Ri	1x105mm, 1x37mm, 2x20mm (AA)	1945	0	SP ATG/AAG
Type 5 Ka-To	Type 4 Chi-To	1x105mm	1945	0	SP ATG

==== Other ====
Name	Chassis	Gun	From (year)	Estimated quantity	Role/s
Type 97 Ki-To SPAAG	Type 97 Te-Ke	Type 98 20 mm AA machine cannon	1938	1	self-propelled anti-aircraft gun
Type 98 Ko-Hi	half-track prime mover	unarmed	1938	unknown number	towing a Type 4 75 mm AA gun
Type 98 20 mm AA half-track vehicle	Type 98 Ko-Hi half-track	Type 98 20 mm AA machine cannon	1942	1	self-propelled anti-aircraft gun
Type 4 Ha-To	Type 4 Chi-So	Type 3 30 cm mortar	1944	4	self-propelled mortar/rocket launcher

=== Armored cars ===
Name	Armament/s	Rail wheels?	Maker/s	From (year)	Estimated quantity	Comment/s
Austin armoured car	none	No	Austin Motor Company/Nissan	1920s	?	
Vickers Crossley armoured car	2× 7.7mm Vickers .303 MG	No	Crossley	1925	?	
Wolseley armoured car	1× 6.5mm Type 3 MG	No	Sumida (Isuzu) under license from Wolseley Motors	1928	?	
Type 2592 Chiyoda	3x6.5mm Type 11 MG	No	Sumida(Isuzu)	1931	200	Also known as "Chiysda" (misspelled). The version used by the Imperial Japanese Navy was known as the Type 2592
(Chiyoda QSW) "Aikoku"	3x6.5mm Type 11 MG	No	Sumida(Isuzu)	1931	2	
(Chiyoda) "Kokusan"	3x6.5mm Type 11 MG	No	Sumida(Isuzu)	1931	?	
Sumida M.2593	1x 7.7mm machine gun	Yes	Sumida(Isuzu)	1931	1,000	Also known as Type 91 armored railroad car So-Mo and a variant produced was known as the Sumida Model P armored car
Type 95 So-Ki armored APC and railroad car	none	Yes	Mitsubishi	1935	121–135	
Type 93 armoured car	1× 7.7mm Vickers .303 MG & 4x 6.5mm MG	Yes	Osaka Naval arsenal	1933	5	Also known as Type 2593 "Hokoku" or Type 93 "Kokusan" or "Type 92" naval armored car
Manchukyo Type 93 armored car	Type 11 37mm gun, Type 11 MG	No	Daidou (Manchu) automobiles	1933	?	
Type 2598 railroad car	none	Yes	?	1938	?	

=== Armored carriers ===
- Type 94 disinfecting vehicle and Type 94 gas scattering vehicle
- Type 97 disinfecting vehicle and Type 97 gas scattering vehicle
- Type 98 So-Da armored ammunition carrier
- Type 100 Te-Re armored artillery observation vehicle
- Type 98 Ko-Hi half-track
- Type 1 Ho-Ki armored personnel carrier
  - Type TC experimental armored personnel carrier
  - Type TE experimental armored personnel carrier
  - Type TG experimental armored personnel carrier
- Type 1 Ho-Ha half-track
- Type 4 Chi-So armored medium tracked carrier
- Type 4 Ka-Tsu armored tracked resupply transport and amphibious torpedo craft
- Experimental light armored ATG carrier "So-To"

=== Armored trains ===
- Improvised armored train
- Special armoured train
- Type 94 armoured train

=== Railroad vehicles ===
==== Wagons ====
- Wagon-1 reconnaissance wagon
- Wagon-1 protective wagon
- Wagon-2 heavy canone wagon
- Wagon-3 light canone wagon
- Wagon-4 infantry wagon
- Wagon-5 command wagon
- Wagon-6 auxiliary tender
- Wagon-7 materials wagon
- Wagon-7 power supply wagon
- Wagon-8 infantry wagon
- Wagon-9 light canone wagon
- Wagon-10 howitzer wagon
- Wagon-11 protective wagon

==== Locomotives ====
- Locomotives Type 97/98/100

==== Railroad cars ====
Japanese has used routinely road-railroad convertible automobiles. These are covered in "Armoured cars" section

=== Engineering and command ===
See List of Japanese Army military engineer vehicles of World War II

=== Trucks ===
- Type 94 6-wheeled truck
- Type 95 mini-truck
- Type 97 4-wheeled truck
- Type 1 6-wheeled truck
- Type 1 4-wheeled truck
- Type 2 heavy truck
- Toyota KB/KC truck
- Nissan Type 80 truck
- Nissan 180 truck
- Amphibious truck "Su-Ki"
- Isuzu Type 94 truck

=== Tractors & prime movers ===
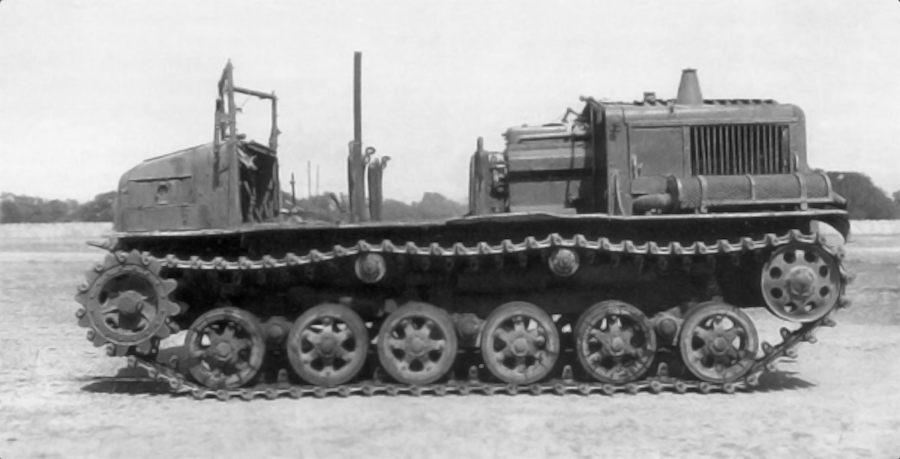
Type 98 6t prime mover Ro-Ke of 1939, towed either the Type 92 10 cm gun or Type 89 15 cm gun

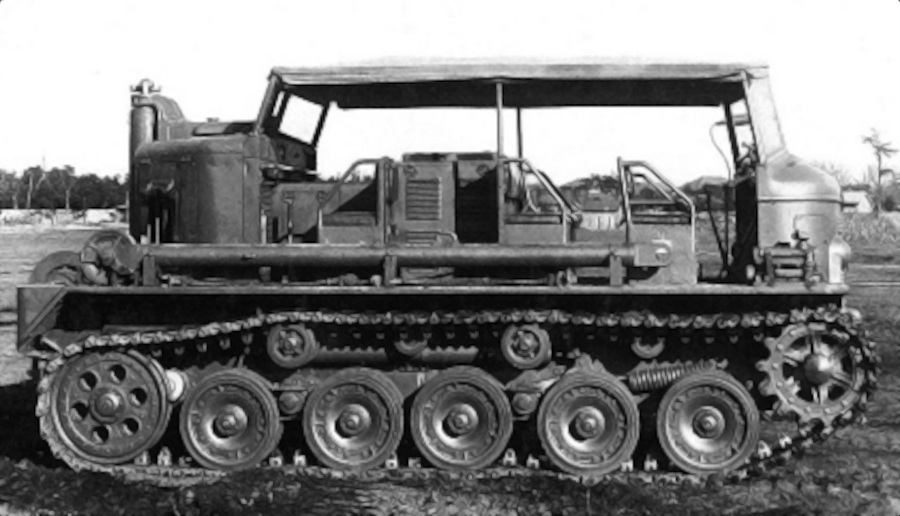
Experimental 16 t prime mover Chi-Ke, developed in 1940/41

- Type 92 5 t prime mover "I-Ke" – Ko model (gasoline engine), introduced in 1931 and weighed 4.6 ton. Otsu model (diesel engine), introduced in 1936 and weighed 5.3 ton. A total of 422 were produced.
- Type 92 8 t prime mover "Ni-Ku" – Ko model (gasoline engine), introduced in 1932 and weighed 8.0 ton. Otsu model (diesel engine), introduced in 1936 and weighed 8.35 ton. A total of 1,657 were produced.
- Type 94 4 t prime mover "Yo-Ke" – introduced in 1934 and weighed 3.55 ton. A total of 133 were produced.
- Type 95 13 t prime mover "Ho-Fu" – Ko model (gasoline engine), introduced in 1935 and weighed 13.0 ton. Otsu model (diesel engine), introduced in 1938 and weighed 13.64 ton. A total of 373 were produced.
- Type 98 4 t prime mover "Shi-Ke" – introduced in 1938 and weighed 4.3 ton. A total of 781 were produced.
- Type 98 6 t prime mover "Ro-Ke" – introduced in 1939 and designed successor of the Type 92 5 t prime mover "I-Ke". It weighed 6.9 ton and a total of 1,983 were produced.
- Experimental 16 t tractor "Chi-Ke" – developed in 1940/1941, it was a heavy prime mover and intended as the designed successor of the Type 95 13 t prime mover "Ho-Fu". It was powered by a diesel engine and had a crane at the backend for light loads. It did not go into production.
- Type 96 AA gun prime mover
- Type 98 20 mm AA machine cannon carrier truck
- Type 98 Ko-Hi half-track prime mover
  - Type 98 20 mm AA half-track vehicle

=== Passenger cars (not armoured) ===
- Toyota AA/AB/AC
- Type 93 6/4-wheeled passenger car
- Small passenger car "Ho-Ya"
- Type 95 passenger car "Kurogane"
- Type 98 passenger car JC
- Model 97 Nissan staff car, Nissan 70

=== Motorcycles ===
- Type 97 motorcycle (licensed Harley-Davidson, Rikuo production)
- Type 1 motorcycle with side car (trike)

=== Miscellaneous vehicles ===
- Type 94 ambulance
- Type 94 repair vehicle

== Army vessels ==
=== River-crossing crafts ===
- Type 95 collapsible boat
- Type 99 pontoon bridge
- Rubber rafts

=== Landing craft ===
- Personnel landing craft "Shohatsu"
- Personnel landing craft "Chuhatsu"
- Vehicle landing craft "Daihatsu"
- Vehicle landing craft "Toku-Daihatsu"
- Vehicle Landing Craft "Mokusei-Daihatsu"

=== Motorboats ===
- Speedboat model Ko
- Speedboat model Otsu
- Suicide-Attack motorboat "Maru-Re"

=== Gun boats ===
- Armored boat "AB-Tei"
- Submarine-chaser "Karo-Tei"

=== IJA Landing craft/aircraft carriers ===
- Hei-class landing craft carrier "Shinshu Maru"
- Hei-class landing craft/aircraft carrier "Akitsu Maru"
- Hei-class landing craft/aircraft carrier "Kumano Maru"
- Ko-class landing craft carrier "Mayasan Maru"
- Ko-class landing craft carrier "Kibitsu Maru"
- Ko-class landing craft carrier "Tamatsu Maru"
- Ko-class landing craft carrier "Hyuga Maru"
- Ko-class landing craft carrier "Settsu Maru"
- Otsu-class landing craft carrier "Takatsu Maru"

=== Transport vessels ===
- Tank landing ship "SS-Tei"
- Fast transport vessel "Yi-Go"
- Transport submarine "Maru-Yu", also referred as Type 3 submergence transport vehicle

== Navy ships and war vessels ==
- List of ships of the Imperial Japanese Navy
- Military production during World War II
- List of ships of the Second World War

== Aircraft ==
- Military production during World War II

== Secret weapons ==
=== Army secret weapons ===
- Remote-control special vehicle "I-Go"
- Unmanned miniature special vehicle "Ya-I"
- Remote-control special working cable car
- Experimental mortar weapon "Ite-Go"
- Remote-control boat "Isu-Go"
- Rocket cannon "Ro-Go"
- Nuclear project "Mishina"
- Engine stopcock "Ha-Go"
- Radio signal jamming device "Ho-Go"
- Electromagnetic anti-tank weapon "To-Go"
- VHF wave application research "Chi-Go"
- High voltage weapon "Ka-Go"
- High voltage obstacle-destroying weapon "Kaha-Go"
- High voltage conductive wire obstacles "Kake-Go"
- High voltage conductive wire net launching rocket "Kate-Go"
- Infrared ray detecting device "Ne-Go"
- Mine-detecting sonar for landing operations "Ra-Go"
- Remote radio-control device "Mu-Go"
- Radio-controlled boat with remote sonar and depth charge deployment device "Musu-Go"
- Device to cause artificial lightning flashes through ray-scattering "U-Go"
- Night vision system "No-Go"
- Microwave heat ray "Ku-Go" (developed at the No. 9 Special Warfare Army Laboratory)
- Infrared homing bomb "Ke-Go"
- Intercontinental balloon bomb "Fu-Go"
- Optical communication device "Ko-Go"
- Rope-launching rocket system "Te-Go"
- Blinding light ray device "Ki-Go"
- Propaganda transmission device "Se-Go"
- Advanced sonar system "Su-Go"
- Anti-tank explosive spear suicide weapon "Shitotsubakurai"
- Experimental armour for machine gunner
- Experimental reconnaissance aircraft "Te-Go"
- Reconnaissance autogyro "Ka-Go"
- Defoliant bacteria bomb
- Ceramic flea-dispersal bomb for plague propagation
- Plan to collapse Chinese economy through introduction of counterfeit yuan

=== Navy secret weapons ===
- I-Go 14 Type Ko-Kai 2 modified A Type 2 I-Go 14 aircraft submarine
- I-Go 15 Type Otsu Type B I-Go 26 aircraft submarine
- I-Go 54 Type Otsu-Kai 2 modified B Type 2 I-Go 54 aircraft submarine
- I-Go 400 Type I-Go 402 aircraft submarine
- Aichi M6A1 Seiran torpedo-bomber (carried in submarines)
- Suicide Attack Diver "Fukuryu"
- "Kaiten" Type 1 suicide attack midget submarine
- "Kairyu" midget submarine
- Nuclear project "F-Go"
- Aircraft battleship class "Ise"

== Radars ==
=== Imperial Japanese Army radars ===
==== Ground-based radar ====
- Ta-Chi 1 ground-based target tracking radar Model 1
- Ta-Chi 2 ground-based target tracking radar Model 2
- Ta-Chi 3 ground-based target tracking radar Model 3
- Ta-Chi 4 ground-based target tracking radar Model 4
- TypeA Bi-static doppler interface detector (high frequency warning device "Ko")
- Ta-Chi 6 Type B fixed early warning device (fixed early warning device "Otsu")
- Ta-Chi 7 Type B mobile early warning device (mobile early warning device "Otsu")
- Ta-Chi 13 aircraft guidance system
- Ta-Chi 18 Type B portable early warning device (portable early warning device "Otsu")
- Ta-Chi 20 fixed early warning device receiver (for Ta-Chi 6)
- Ta-Chi 24 mobile anti-aircraft radar (Japanese Wurzburg radar)
- Ta-Chi 28 aircraft guidance device
- Ta-Chi 31 ground-based target tracking radar Model 4 modified

==== Airborne radar ====
- Ta-Ki 1 Model 1 airborne surveillance radar
- Ta-Ki 1 Model 2 airborne surveillance radar
- Ta-Ki 1 Model 3 airborne surveillance radar
- Ta-Ki 11 ECM device
- Ta-Ki 15 aircraft guidance device receiver (for Tachi 13)

==== Shipborne radar ====
- Ta-Se 1 anti-surface radar
- Ta-Se 2 anti-surface radar

=== Imperial Japanese Navy radars ===
==== Land-based radar ====
- Type 2 Mark 1 Model 1 early warning radar ("11-Go" early warning radar)
- Type 2 Mark 1 Model 1 modify 1 early warning radar ("11-Go" Model 1 early warning radar)
- Type 2 Mark 1 Model 1 modify 2 early warning radar ("11-Go" Model 2 early warning radar)
- Type 2 Mark 1 Model 1 modify 3 early warning radar ("11-Go" Model 3 early warning radar)
- Type 2 Mark 1 Model 2 mobile early warning radar ("12-Go" mobile early warning radar)
- Type 2 Mark 1 Model 2 modify 2 mobile early warning radar ("12-Go" modify 2 mobile early warning radar)
- Type 2 Mark 1 Model 2 modify 3 mobile early warning radar ("12-Go" modify 3 mobile early warning radar)
- Type 3 Mark 1 Model 1 early warning radar ("11-Go" modified early warning radar)
- Type 3 Mark 1 Model 3 small size early warning radar ("13-Go" small size early warning radar)
- Type 3 Mark 1 Model 4 long-range air search radar ("14-Go" long-range air search radar)
- Type 2 Mark 4 Model 1 anti-aircraft fire-control radar (Japanese SCR-268)
- Type 2 Mark 4 Model 2 anti-aircraft fire-control radar (Japanese SCR-268) (S24 anti-aircraft fire-control radar)

==== Airborne radar ====
- Type 3 air Mark 6 Model 4 airborne ship-search radar (H6 airborne ship-search radar) (N6 airborne ship-search radar)
- Type 5 Model 1 radio location night vision device

==== Shipborne radar ====
- Type 2 Mark 2 Model 1 air search radar ("21-Go" air search radar)
- Type 2 Mark 2 Model 2 modify 3 anti-surface, fire assisting radar for submarine ("21-Go" modify 3 anti-surface, fire-assisting Radar)
- Type 2 Mark 2 Model 2 modify 4 Anti-Surface, Fire-assisting Radar for Ship ("21-Go" Modify 4 Anti-Surface, Fire-assisting Radar)
- Type 2 Mark 3 Model 1 anti-surface fire-control radar ("31-Go" anti-surface fire-control radar)
- Type 2 Mark 3 Model 2 anti-surface fire-control radar ("32-Go" anti-surface fire-control radar)
- Type 2 Mark 3 Model 3 anti-surface fire-control radar ("33-Go" anti-surface fire-control radar)

== Missiles & bombs ==
Name	Type	From (year)	Mass (kg)	Role/s	User/s	Comment/s
Kawasaki Ki-147 I-Go Type1 – Ko	guided missile	1944	1,400	air-to-surface	IJA	Radio-guided, also known as I-Go-1A
Mitsubishi I-Go-1B	guided missile	1944	680	air-to-surface	IJA	Radio-guided, also known as Ki-148 or I-Go Type 1-Hei
Ke-Go	guided missile	1944	680	air-to-surface	IJA	IR homing version of Ki-148
Funshin-dan	unguided missile	1943	40	surface-to-air	IJN	used in battle of Iwo Jima
Funryu	guided missile	1943	1,900	surface-to-air	IJN	Radio-guided, models Funryu-1 to Funryu-4
Yokosuka MXY7 Ohka	guided missile	1945	2,140	surface-to-air	IJN	guided by suicide pilot
Type 92 No. 1	bomb	1932	15	air-to-surface	IJA	–
Type 92 No. 25	bomb	1932	250	air-to-surface	IJA	–
Type 92 No. 50	bomb	1932	500	air-to-surface	IJA	–
Type 94 No. 5	bomb	1934	50	air-to-surface	IJA	–
Type 94 Mod. No. 5	bomb	1934	50	air-to-surface	IJA	–
Type 94 No. 10	bomb	1934	100	air-to-surface	IJA	–
Type 94 No. 10 Mod.	bomb	1934	100	air-to-surface	IJA	–
Type 97 No. 6	bomb	1937	60	air-to-surface	IJN	used in Pearl Harbor attack
Type 98 No. 25	bomb	1938	30	air-to-surface	IJN	used in Pearl Harbor attack
Type 99 No. 3 Mod.	bomb	1939	30	air-to-surface	IJA	–
Type 99 No. 80	bomb	1939	800	anti-ship	IJN	used in Pearl Harbor attack
Type 99 No. 25	bomb	1939	30	anti-ship	IJN	used in Pearl Harbor attack
Type 1 No. 5	bomb	1941	50	air-to-surface	IJA	–
Type 1 No. 10	bomb	1941	100	air-to-surface	IJA	–
Type 1 No. 25	bomb	1941	250	air-to-surface	IJA	–
Type 3 No. 10	bomb	1943	100	air-to-surface	IJA	–
Type 3 No. 25	bomb	1943	250	air-to-surface	IJA	Skipping bomb
Type 4 No. 10	bomb	1944	100	anti-ship	IJA	–
Type 4 No. 25	bomb	1944	250	anti-ship	IJA	–
Type 4 No. 50	bomb	1944	500	anti-ship	IJA	–

=== Unclear IJA bombs ===
- Type Ro-3
- Type Ro-5
- Type Ro-7

=== Unclear IJN bombs ===
- Type 3 No.1 28-go bomb Type 2
- Type 3 No.1 28-go bomb Type 2 modify 1
- Type 3 No.1 28-go bomb Type 2 modify 2
- Type 3 No.1 28-go bomb "Maru-Sen"
- No. 6 27-go bomb
- Type 3 No.25 4-go bomb Type 1
- Type 3 No.50 4-go bomb

=== Unclear bomb ===
- Type 4456 100 kg Skipping bomb

== Cartridges and shells ==
=== Cartridges ===
Name	Bullet mass (g)	Bullet type	Velocity (m/s)	Energy (J)
7×20mm Nambu	4	FMJ	240	108
8×22mm Nambu	7	FMJ	290	274
9×22mmR Japanese	9.7	LRN	229	252
6.5×50mmSR Arisaka (9g Ball)	9	FMJ	770	2,666
7.7×56mmR (10g SP)	10	SP	844	3,463
7.7×56mmR (12g SP)	12	SP	783	3,574
7.7×56mmR (11g HPBT)	11	HPBT	761	3,265
7.7×58mm Arisaka (11g Ball)	11	FMJ	740	3,136
7.7x58mmSR (13g Ball)	13	FMJ	670	3,190

=== High explosive anti-tank (HEAT) shells ===
Gun	Caliber (mm)	Mass (kg)	Length (mm)	Penetration (mm)
Type 90/97 tank gun	57	1.80	189	55
Type 92 infantry gun	70	3.38	281	90
Type 41 75 mm mountain gun	75	3.95	297	100
Type 38 12 cm howitzer	120	13.03	387	140
Type 4 15 cm howitzer	149	21.04	524	150

Among them, the HEAT of Type 41 mountain gun was used in action and destroyed several Allied tanks in Burma and other places. The use of the HEAT for other guns is not known.

Other HEAT shell was the projectile of Type 94 mountain gun. The HEAT of Type 94 mountain gun was not produced though it was developed.

== See also ==
- List of World War II weapons
- List of artillery weapons of the Imperial Japanese Navy
- List of infantry weapons of the Imperial Japanese Navy
- List of military aircraft of Japan
- Military production during World War II
