= Type 94 =

Type 94 may refer to:

- Type 94 tankette
- Type 94 8 mm pistol
- Type 94 37 mm anti-tank gun
- Type 94 75 mm mountain gun
- Type 94 90 mm infantry mortar
- Type 94 armoured train
- Type 94 disinfecting vehicle and Type 94 gas scattering vehicle
- 40 cm/45 Type 94 naval gun
- Type 094 submarine
