= List of infantry weapons of the Imperial Japanese Navy =

During their reign of power, the Japanese Imperial Navy utilized many weapons, from their initial formation in 1868 to help defend themselves against rapidly growing neighbors and Western countries, to their ultimate demise in 1945 after Japan surrendered to the Allies in World War II. These weapons consisted of; rifles, Pistols, Submachine guns, Machine guns, infantry mortars, grenades and grande discharges, Light anti-aircraft weapons, Anti-tank weapons, Flamethrower, and Military swords. These weapons were utilized to help build the strength of the Japanese Imperial Navy but also defend and attack against opposing Navies.

== Rifles ==
- Type 38 rifle
- Type 38 cavalry rifle
- Type 44 cavalry rifle
- Type 97 sniper rifle
- Type 99 rifle
- Type 99 sniper rifle
- Type I rifle (not to be confused with TERA Type 1)
- TERA rifles (Type 100 rifle, Type 1 rifle, Type 2 rifle)
- Arisakas (rifle)
- VZ-24 (rifle)

== Pistols ==
- Type 26 9 mm revolver
- Type 14 8 mm Nambu pistol
- Type 94 8 mm pistol

== Sub machine guns ==
- Bergmann sub machine gun
- Type 100 submachine gun

== Machine guns ==
- Type 11 light machine gun
- Type 96 light machine gun
- Type 99 light machine gun
- Type 3 heavy machine gun
- Type 92 heavy machine gun
- Type 1 heavy machine gun

== Infantry Mortars ==
- Type 11 70 mm infantry mortar
- Type 94 90 mm infantry mortar
- Type 96 150 mm infantry mortar
- Type 97 81 mm infantry mortar
- Type 97 90 mm infantry mortar
- Type 97 150 mm infantry mortar
- Type 99 81 mm infantry mortar
- Type 2 120 mm infantry mortar
- Type 98 50 mm stick mortar

== Grenades and grenade dischargers ==
- Type 10 grenade
- Type 91 grenade
- Type 97 grenade
- Type 99 grenade
- Ceramic grenade
- Type 10 grenade discharger
- Type 89 grenade discharger
- Rifle grenade dischargers

== Light anti-aircraft weapons ==
- Type 98 20 mm AA rapid-fire anti-tank machine cannon
- Type 2 20 mm AA machine cannon
- Type 2 20 mm twin AA machine cannon
- Type 4 20 mm twin AA machine cannon
- AA mine discharger

== Anti-tank weapons ==
- Type 97 20 mm AT rifle
- Type 99 AT mine
- Type 2 AT rifle grenade
- Type 3 AT grenade
- Lunge AT mine
- Model 93 pressure anti-tank/personnel mine
- Model 99 magnetic anti-tank mine

== Flamethrower ==
- Type 100 flamethrower

== Military swords ==
- Type 98 military sword
