= Type 98 =

Note: In Japanese military usage, a "Type" number denoted the year it was accepted into production, according to the Japanese calendar but using only the last two digits and a different calendar). Year 98 was 1938 (after Year 99, numbering starts again at 0). Thus, any piece of equipment, from rifles to machine guns to aircraft to artillery and uniforms which was accepted in 1938 is called the "Type 98". (This can be confusing when two pieces of similar equipment share the same designation, such as the Type 89 machine gun, or the Type 1 machine gun, which shared a designation with the Imperial Japanese Army's Ho-103 machine gun.)

Type 98 may refer to:

== Japanese military vehicles ==
- Type 98 20 mm AA half-track vehicle
- Type 98 20 mm AAG tank
- Type 98 So-Da, utility vehicle
- Type 98 Chi-Ho Japanese prototype medium tank
- Type 98 Ke-Ni, a Japanese light tank

== Japanese guns ==
- Imperial Japanese Army's version of the MG 15 machine gun
- 10 cm/65 Type 98 naval gun, a 100mm naval gun used on Japanese destroyers.
- Type 98 20 mm AA machine cannon

== Japanese military aircraft ==
- Aichi E11A, which was designated Type 98 reconnaissance seaplane
- Mitsubishi Ki-15, which was designated Navy Type 98 reconnaissance plane model I
- Tachikawa Ki-36, which was designated Type 98 direct co-operation aircraft

== Other Japanese war material ==
- Type 98 officers sword, called "Shin gunto".
- Type 98 grenade
- Various Japanese naval bombs, see List of Japanese World War II navy bombs
- A Japanese explosive, see List of Japanese World War II explosives
- a Japanese uniform, see Imperial Japanese Army Uniforms

== Chinese war material ==
- Type 99 and Type 98 Chinese tanks
- Type 98 120 mm recoilless anti-tank rocket of the People's Liberation Army
