= List of artillery weapons of the Imperial Japanese Navy =

This is a list of heavy artillery weapons of the Imperial Japanese Navy of World War II.

== Anti tank guns ==
- Type 94 37 mm Anti-Tank Gun
- Model 96 25 mm AT/AA Gun
- Type 1 37 mm Anti-Tank Gun
- Type 1 47 mm Anti-Tank Gun

== Light anti-aircraft gun ==
- Type 93 13.2 mm AA machinegun

== Medium anti-aircraft gun ==
- Model 96 25 mm Dual Purpose Anti-Tank/Anti-Aircraft Gun
- Vickers Type 40 mm AT/AA Gun
- Type 4 75 mm AA Gun
- Type 11 75 mm AA Gun
- Type 88 75 mm AA Gun

== Heavy anti-aircraft gun ==
- Type 3 12 cm AA Gun
- Type 3 80 mm Anti-Aircraft Gun
- Type 5 15 cm AA Gun (project)
- Type 10 120 mm AA Gun
- Type 14 10 cm AA Gun
- Type 99 88 mm AA Gun

== Rocket launcher (ground use) ==
- 25 mm Rocket Gun Launcher
- 80 mm Anti-Tank Rocket Launcher
- 100 mm Anti-Tank Rocket Launcher
- 120 mm Rocket Launcher
- 120 mm Six-Rocket Launcher
- 200 mm Rocket Launcher Model 1
- 200 mm Rocket Launcher Model 2
- 200 mm Rocket Launcher Model 3
- 450 mm Heavy Rocket Launcher
- Type 6 Ground Use Bomb Projection Rocket Launcher Model 11
- Type 6 Ground Use Bomb Projection Rocket Launcher Model 13
- Type 3 Rocket Launcher Model 1
- Type 3 Rocket Launcher Model 2
- Type 3 Rocket Launcher Model 2Modify 1

== Rocket launcher (carrier-based) ==
- 75 mm Blast-Off Rocket Launcher
- 120 mm Rocket Launcher
- Type 5 12 cm Rocket Launcher
- 120 mm 30-Rocket Launcher
- 150 mm Rocket Depth Bomb Launcher

== See also ==
- List of Japanese military equipment of World War II
