= Hōyo Fortress =

- Bungo Channel, Japan
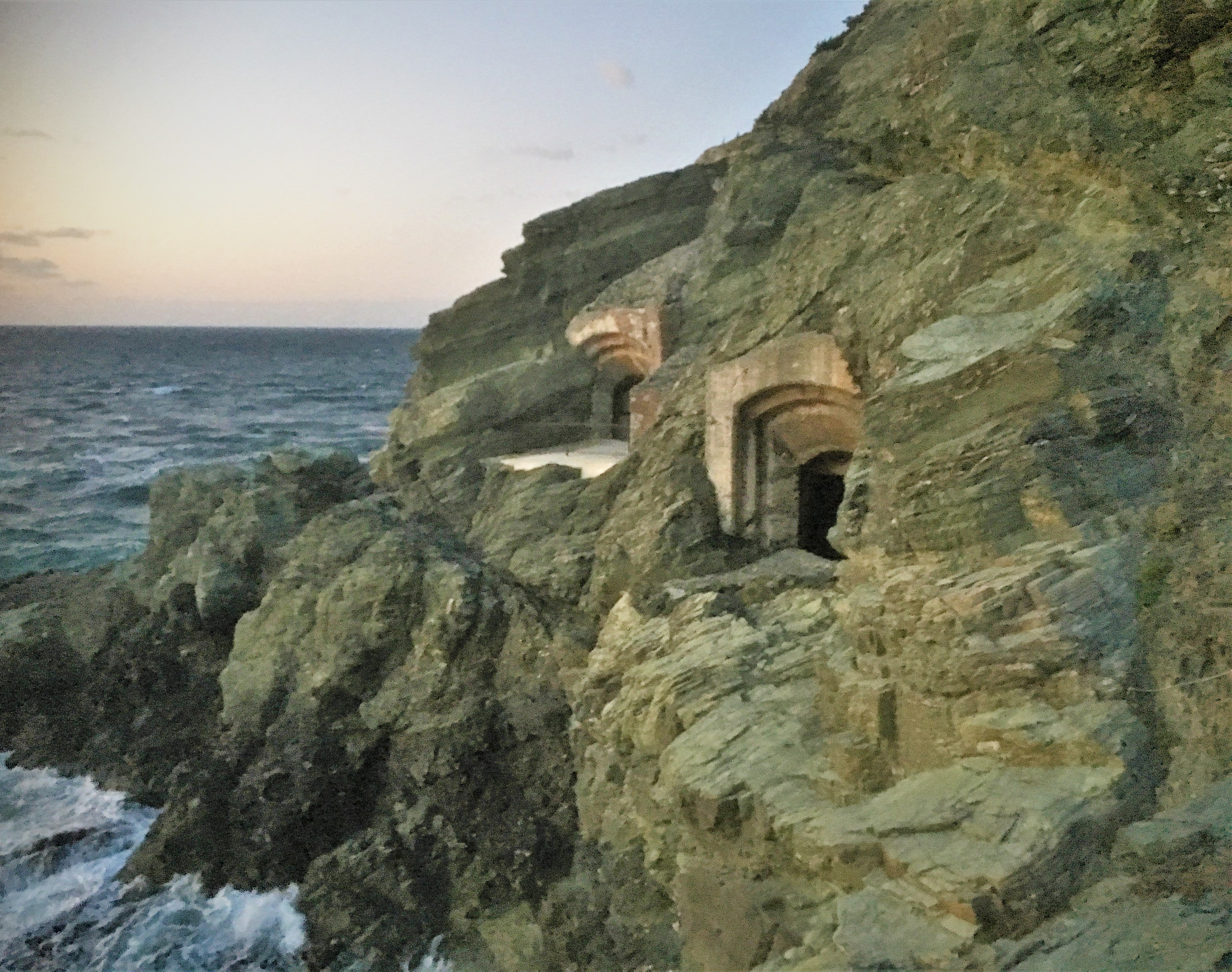
- ruins of Sadamisaki Battery

Site information
- Type: Defensive fortification
- Controlled by: Empire of Japan
- Condition: ruins

Location
- Coordinates: 33.3438°N 132.0126°E

Site history
- Built: 1920–1945
- Materials: Concrete; Wood; Steel
- Demolished: 1946
- Battles/wars: World War II

Garrison information
- Occupants: Imperial Japanese Army

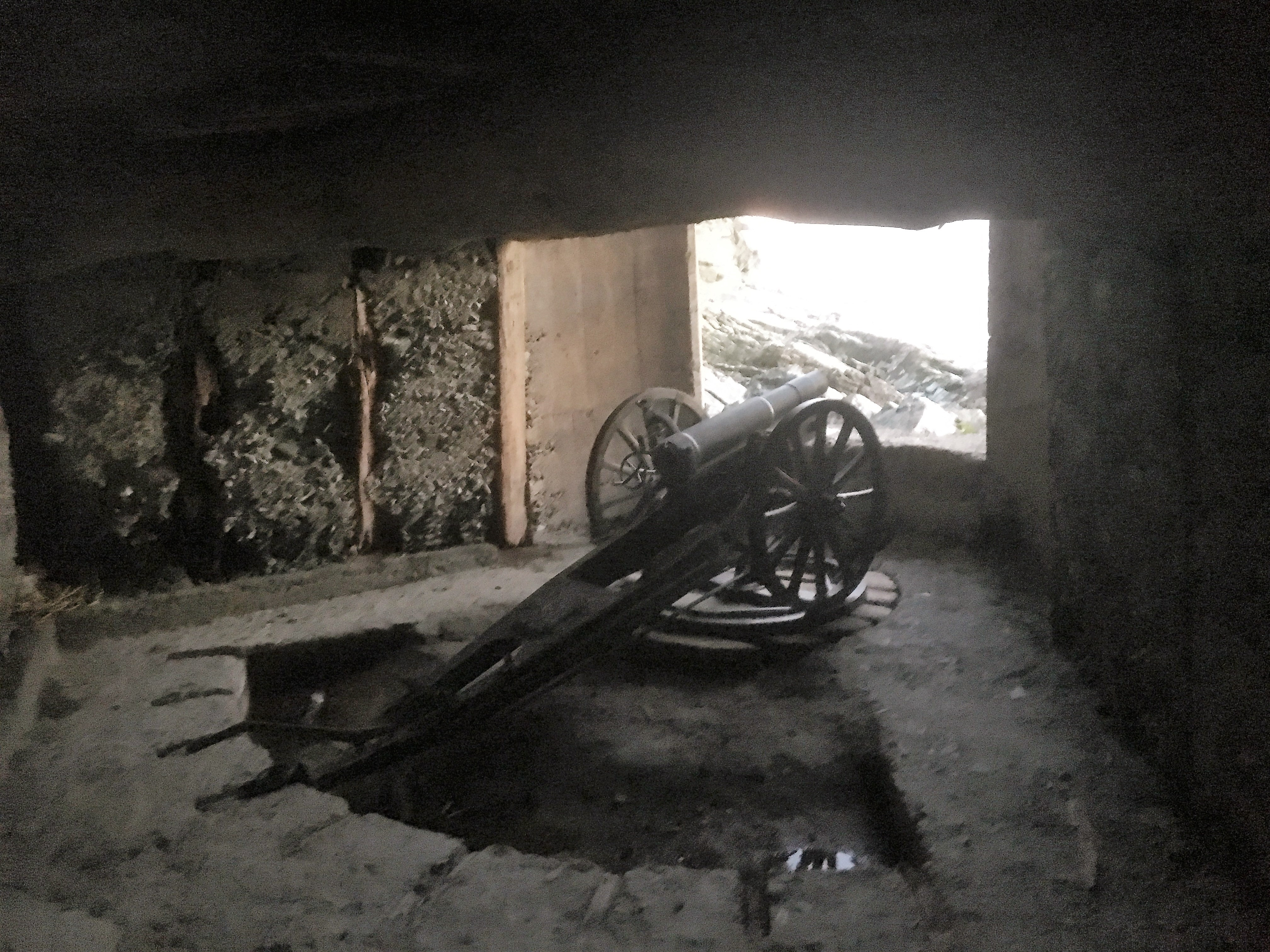
ruins of Sadamisaki Battery

Hōyo Fortress (豊予要塞, Hōyo yōsai) was the name of a group of coastal fortifications built to guard the Hōyo Strait at the entrance to Bungo Channel between the Japanese islands of Kyushu and Shikoku and this the western entrance to the Seto Inland Sea. These gun batteries and fortifications ceased to be used after the end of World War II.

== History ==
After the Meiji restoration, the primary threats to the new Empire of Japan were perceived to be Qing China's Beiyang fleet, followed by the Russian Empire's Pacific Fleet. The Meiji government ordered the construction of a set of coastal fortifications to protect the strategic waterway and approaches to major coastal cities. Initially, the Hiroshima Port Fortress was constructed to protect the city of Hiroshima, which was the location of the Imperial General Headquarters in the First Sino-Japanese War and the Geiyō Fortress was constructed to control the Kurushima Strait, a narrows in the Seto Inland Sea between Hiroshima and Shikoku, which blocked the western approaches to Kobe and Osaka.

From 1920, construction began on coastal fortifications to control the much wider Bungo Channel. Geiyō Fortress was abolished in 1924 and Hiroshima Bay Fortress in 1926. A second groups of batteries were completed between 1930 and 1934. The fortifications were in five groups: the island of Takashima and Cape Sekizaki (both in the city of Ōita, Cape Tsuru (in Saiki, Ōita), Saganoseki Saganoseki, Ōita, and Cape Sada (Ikata, Nishiuwa District, Ehime).

The largest guns installed were 28-cm howitzers of the same type which were under during the Russo-Japanese War at the Siege of Port Arthur to get effect against the Russian Pacific Fleet. From the 1920s and 1930s, many surplus guns of the Imperial Japanese Navy, which had been made available due to the reduction of capital warships per the London Naval Treaty and the Washington Naval Treaty, were reused in these coastal artillery installations.

With the approach of World War II, efforts were made to modernize and strength these coastal batteries. In particular, at the Taga Battery in Saiki, Oita, the EOC 12-inch 45-calibre naval guns formerly used as the main battery of the scrapped cruiser Ibuki were installed. During a training exercise in January 1942, one of these guns exploded due to a turret breach, killing 16 men and injuring 18 others.

All fortifications were dismantled at the end of World War II.

== Gun emplacements ==
=== Takashima Island ===
- Takashima No.1 Battery (2x 12cm rapid fire guns)
- Takashima No.2 Battery (4x 30cm howitzers)
- Takashima No.3 Battery (4x 12-cm rapid fire cannons)

=== Cape Sekizaki ===
- Sekizaki Battery (15cm rapid fire cannon)

=== Cape Sada ===
- Sadamisaki No.1 Battery (4x 15cm howitzer, removed 1944)
- Sadamisaki No.2 Battery (4x cannon, removed 1944)
- Sadamisaki No.3 Battery (2x Type 38 12 cm howitzer, installed 1945)
- Sadamisaki No.4 Battery (2x Type 38 12 cm howitzer, installed 1945)

=== Cape Tsurumisaki ===
- Taga 1st Battery (26 x 30cm cannon, damaged January 1942)
- Tsurumisaki No.1 Battery (4x 15cm cannon)
- Tsurumisaki No.2 Battery (4x 12cm howitzer)

=== Saganoseki ===
- Shiroki Main Magazine

== See also ==
- Western District Army (Japan)
- Second General Army (Japan)
- Japanese Sixteenth Area Army
