= Type 98 Ko-Hi =

Type 98 Ko-Hi half-track (short version)
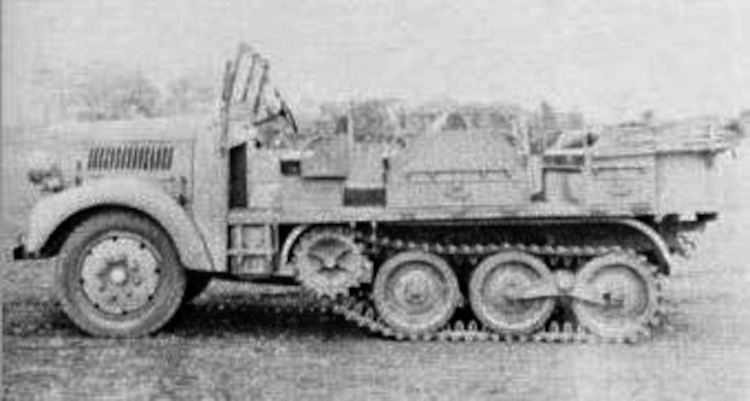
- Place of origin: Empire of Japan

Specifications
- Mass: 5.281 ton
- Length: 5.3 m (17 ft)
- Width: 2.0 m (6.6 ft)
- Height: 2.2 m (7.2 ft)
- Crew: 15
- Engine: air-cooled diesel 110 PS (81 kW)
- Power/weight: 32.5 HP/tonne
- Suspension: bellcrank
- Operational range: 200 km
- Maximum speed: 30 mph (48 km/h)

The Type 98 Ko-Hi a/k/a Type 98 half-tracked prime mover "Ko-Hi" was a half-track used by the Imperial Japanese Army (IJA). There were two versions produced, beginning in 1938. The Type 98 Ko-Hi half-track (short version) and the Type 98 Ko-Hi half-track (long version). They were used during the Second Sino-Japanese War and World War II.

== History ==
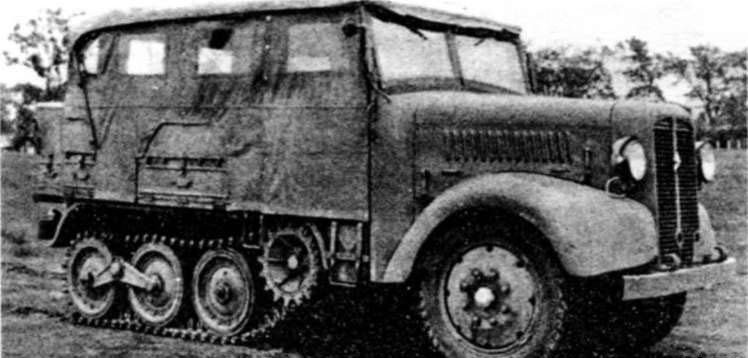
Front angle view of Type 98 Ko-Hi half-track (short version) with canvas cover

During the 1920s, the Imperial Japanese Army (IJA) used several types of trucks to transport Anti-aircraft guns. In 1936 the Type 96 AA gun prime mover (a/k/a "gun tractor") was developed from the Type 94 6-wheeled truck. The Type-94 prime mover on which it was based had shown to be a reliable vehicle.

Additional efforts were made by the Imperial Japanese Army to produce greater anti-aircraft mobilization. This effort included the Type 98 half-tracks, which were introduced into service in 1938. They were considered "high speed" prime movers, capable of 48 km/h (30 mph) when loaded. The half-track was given the official designation of the Type 98 half-tracked prime mover Ko-Hi. It had a diesel engine and a crew of 15. The Type 98 Ko-Hi was used to tow a Type 4 75 mm AA gun. The 20 mm AA machine cannon carrier truck was also produced and a prototype variant known as the Type 98 20 mm AA half-track vehicle was made. This Type 98 prototype had a single 20 mm Type 98 AA cannon mounted on the back section of a Type 98 Ko-Hi half-track. The prototype did not enter mass production.

== Versions ==
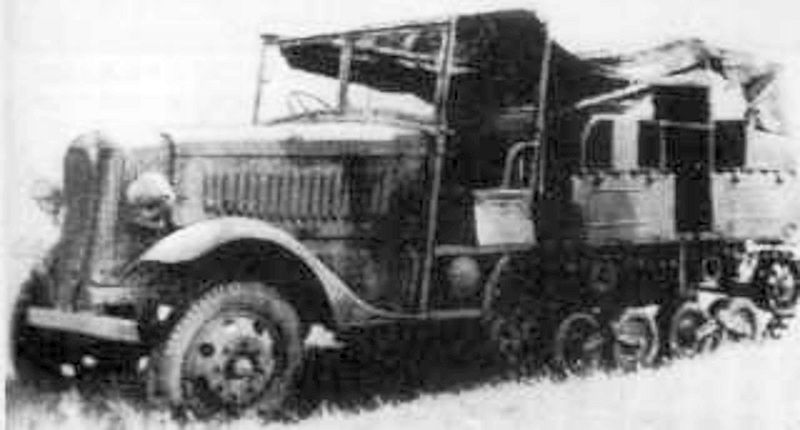
Type 98 Ko-Hi half-track (long version)

Two versions of the Type 98 Ko−Hi half-track prime mover were produced. The Type 98 Ko-Hi half-track (short version) and the Type 98 Ko-Hi half-track (long version). The main differences were in the dimensions of the vehicles and chassis of the vehicles. The "long version" specifications:

- length:5.67 m (18.6 ft)
- width:1.9 m (6.2 ft)
- height:2.3 m (7.5 ft)
- weight:6 ton

The total number of half-tracks built in relation to each of the two versions produced is unknown.

== See also ==
- Type 1 Ho-Ki
- Type 1 Ho-Ha
