= Type 98 Ta-Se =

Type 98 Ta-Se self-propelled anti-aircraft gun
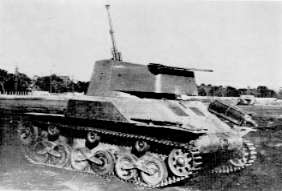
- Type: Self-propelled anti-aircraft gun
- Place of origin: Empire of Japan

Production history
- Designed: 1938
- Produced: 1941
- No. built: 1 prototype

Specifications
- Mass: 22 tons
- Length: 4.78 m (15 ft 8 in)
- Width: 2.19 m (7 ft 2 in)
- Height: 2.58 m (8 ft 6 in)
- Crew: 5
- Armor: 6–16 mm
- Main armament: Type 98 20 mm AA machine cannon
- Engine: petrol 130hp
- Suspension: bellcrank
- Operational range: 300 km (190 mi)
- Maximum speed: 42 km/h (26 mph)

The experimental Type 98 Ta-Se was a Japanese self-propelled anti-aircraft gun using a Type 98 20 mm anti-aircraft gun. It used the chassis of the Type 98 Ke-Ni light tank. It did not enter production.

== History and development ==
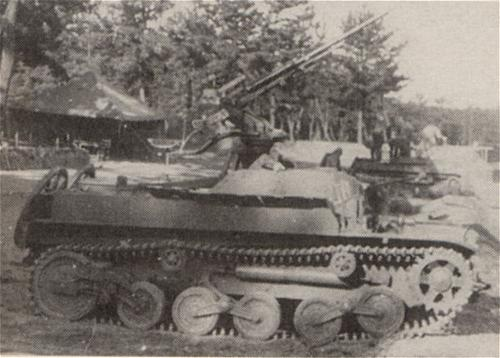
Side view of SPAAG Ki-To

During development of an AA gun tank, the Imperial Japanese Army experimented with various configurations. Prior to the Type 98 Ta-Se, an earlier prototype was produced that was known as the experimental Type 97 Ki-To self-propelled anti-aircraft gun. The original Type 97 Te-Ke tankette turret was removed, and a single Type 98 20 mm AA machine cannon was mounted on the modified chassis without a protective gun shield. It did not enter production.

Thereafter in November 1941, initial development began on a new prototype single gun AA tank that was designated the Type 98 Ta-Se self-propelled anti-aircraft gun. The name was taken from taikū ('anti-air') sensha ('tank'). The conventional turret was removed from the hull and a new open-top cylindrical shaped turret was installed. It was equipped with a single converted Type 98 20 mm AA machine cannon. During trials, it was determined that the chassis used for the Ta-Se was too small to be a stable "firing platform". It did not enter production.

== Gallery ==
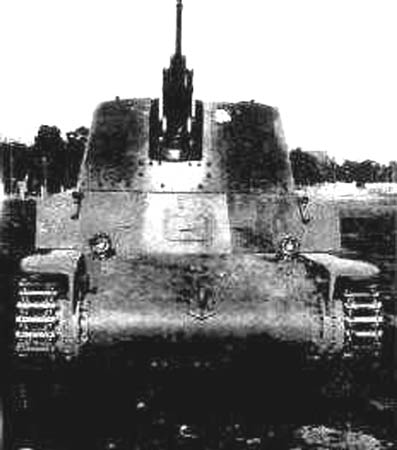
Front view of Type 98 Ta-Se

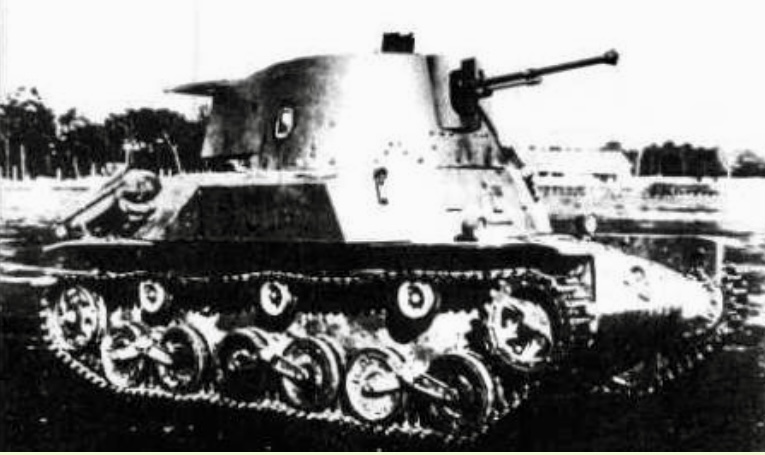
Side angle view of Type 98 Ta-Se

== Twin gun version ==
After the Type 98 Ta-Se SPAAG was abandoned, a prototype known as the Type 98 20 mm AAG tank was produced using the Type 98 chassis. The gun tank was equipped with a modified twin Type 2 20 mm AA machine cannon mounted on a raised platform with a gun shield. It also did not enter mass production after testing.

== See also ==
- Type 98 20 mm AA half-track vehicle
- 20 mm AA machine cannon carrier truck
