= Type 94 armoured train =

1934 Japanese armoured train

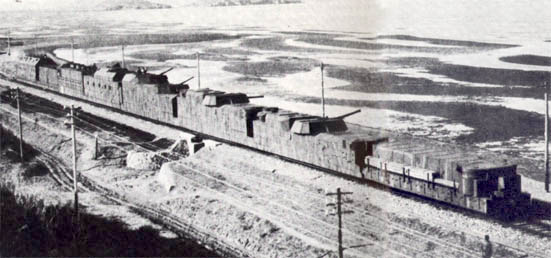
Type 94 armoured train

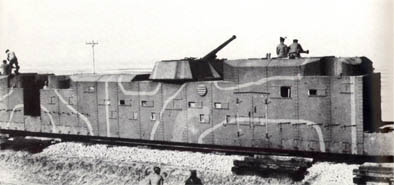
Close up of Type 94 armoured train artillery car

The Type 94 armoured train was built in 1934 and used by the Imperial Japanese Army forces during World War II. It originally consisted of 8 cars and later added an additional car, for a total of 9. For armament, it had two Type 14 10 cm AA guns and two Type 88 75 mm AA guns. The Type 94 armoured train was part of the 1st Armoured Train Unit in Manchuria.
