= Inagaki pistol =

- Type: Semi-automatic pistol
- Place of origin: Empire of Japan

Service history
- Used by: Imperial Japanese Army; Imperial Japanese Navy
- Wars: World War II

Production history
- Designer: Iwakichi Inagaki
- Designed: 1937
- Produced: 1941-1943
- No. built: Approx. 500

Specifications
- Cartridge: .32 ACP; 8x22mm Nambu
- Action: Blowback
- Feed system: 8-round detachable box magazine

The Inagaki pistol is a semi-automatic pistol, designed by Iwakichi Inagaki, a retired employee from the Koishikawa Arsenal. Only 500 pistols were produced which were used both by Imperial Japanese Army and Imperial Japanese Navy (in small quantities). Production ceased in 1943 as the company focused on making pistol that could fire 8x22mm Nambu cartridge but they did not succeed. Only three pistols for 8mm Nambu were produced.

== Design details ==
The Inagaki is a simple blowback pistol with a very peculiar appearance. The weapon's safety lever is located on the left side of the weapon, although it is slightly odd in that the fire mode the weapon is in is determined by the marking not covered by the lever. When the weapon is in safe, the slide cannot be pulled back fully.

The slide is held in place only by the trigger guard, which makes disassembly of the weapon extremely simple; rotate the trigger guard and simply pull the slide and barrel off the weapon.
