= Type 4 70 mm AT rocket launcher =

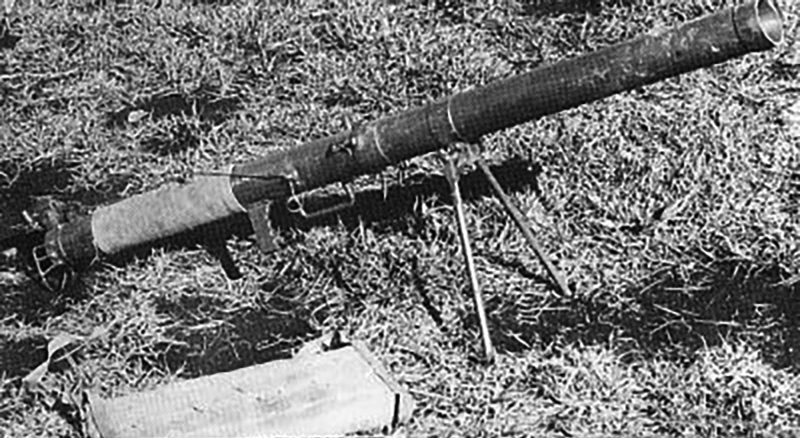
- Type: Rocket launcher
- Place of origin: Empire of Japan

Service history
- Used by: Imperial Japanese Army
- Wars: World War II

Production history
- Designed: 1944
- No. built: 3,500

Specifications
- Mass: 8 kg /17.64 lb
- Length: 1.5 m /4.92 ft
- Cartridge: 72x359 mm
- Caliber: 74 mm
- Muzzle velocity: 160 m/s

The Type 4 70 mm AT rocket launcher was a Japanese rocket launcher used during the last year of World War II. It was to be used in the Japanese mainland in case of an invasion by the Allies. It was comparable to the German Panzerschreck and the American bazooka.

== History ==
By 1944 the Americans were using M1 bazooka anti-tank rocket launchers in the Pacific Theater against the Japanese. In response, the Japanese began development of the Type 4 rocket launcher. Unlike the US rocket, that used fins to stabilize it in flight, the Japanese rocket had angled venturis in the base to spin the rocket for stability, in a similar manner to the 20 cm (8 in) HE rocket.

When the Chinese reverse engineered the American M20 Super Bazooka in the Korean War to produce the Type 51 90 mm rocket launcher, they used the data of the experimental Type 4 AT rocket launcher left at the 52nd Military Arsenal in Shenyang. (formerly the IJA South Manchuria Arsenal)

== Development ==
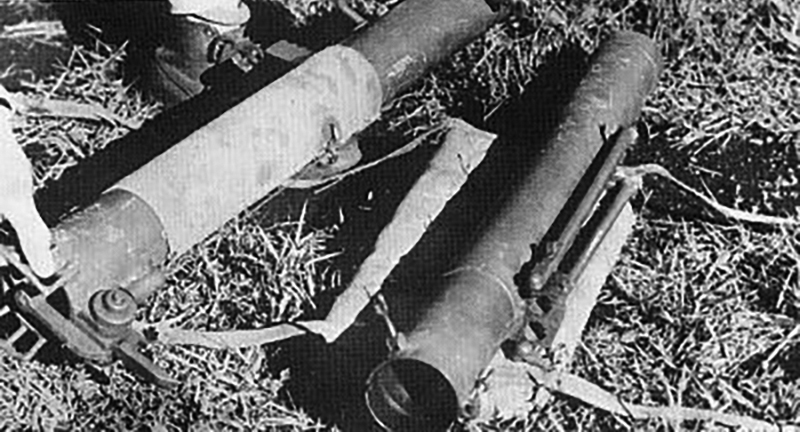
Type 4 70 mm AT rocket launcher, disassembled

The launcher was made in two parts that were joined in the middle, similar to the US 3.5-inch rocket launcher. It was designed to be fired by a soldier while prone. The weapon itself had a bipod similar to the one on the Type 99 LMG. The gunner lay with his body at approximately a 45-degree angle to the bore on the left side while the loader was similarly positioned on the other side. The pistol grip and trigger mechanism were attached to the rear half of the launcher. A cable ran from the trigger to the rear of the launcher where the hammer was located. The hammer and firing pin was mounted on an arm. The arm was above the bore and out of the way of loading the rocket when it was in the cocked position. Pulling the trigger pulled the pin holding the arm in position and the arm swung around under spring pressure, striking the primer and igniting the rocket.

The 70 mm rocket, like the 20 cm model, used a mortar fuze. There would be no set back when the rocket was fired to arm an artillery fuze. The Japanese mortar fuze for the 81 mm and 90 mm used a shear wire to make it bore safe. The wire went through the brass body and aluminum firing pin plunger. Upon impact the plunger was forced back, shearing the wire and freeing the plunger to strike the firing pin and detonate the round.

== See also ==
- Type 5 45mm recoilless rifle
