= Type 2 rifle grenade launcher =

Japanese gun attachment

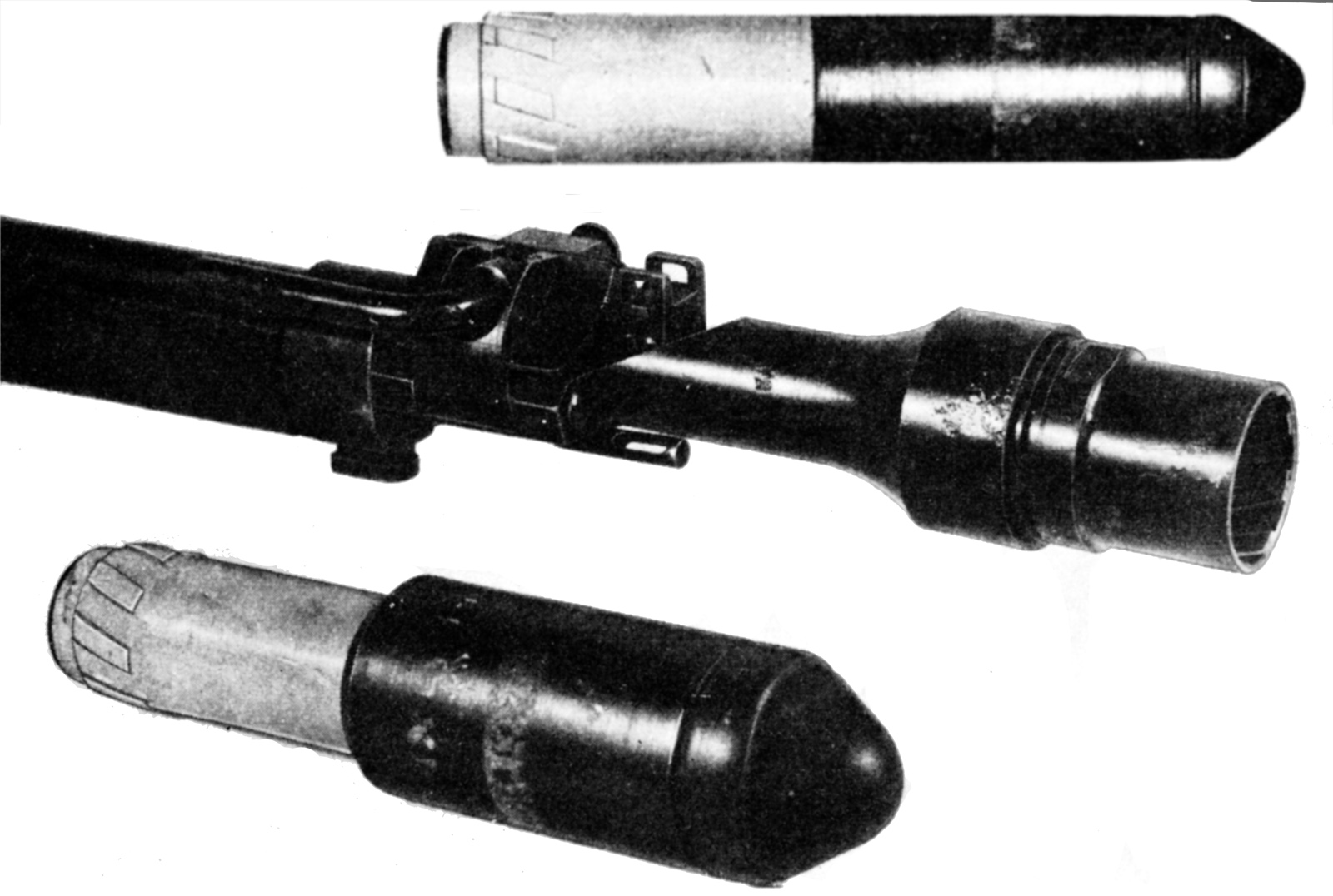
A Type 2 rifle grenade launcher, with a 30 mm Type 2 grenade (top), and a large 40 mm Type 2 grenade (bottom).

The Type 2 rifle grenade launcher was an attachment for the Japanese Type 38 and Type 99 rifles that allowed them to fire special hollow charge grenades. It was a version of the German Schiessbecher grenade launcher. Two grenades were produced for the launcher: a 30 mm calibre grenade and a larger 40 mm calibre grenade, both designated Type 2. The launcher sits over the end of the barrel, held in place with a clamping device. A special crimped blank cartridge or wooden bullet is used to fire the grenades.

The rear of the grenades is pre-rifled to mate with the rifling in the launcher. The rifling ensures that the grenade is spun in flight, giving it stability and arming the rotational fuze. Both grenades use a largely identical fuze, which makes up the rear part of the grenade. On impact, momentum carries the striker assembly forward, overcoming the resistant force of a creep spring into the detonator.

	30 mm grenade	40 mm grenade
Length	160 mm (6.3 in)	180 mm (7.1 in)
Length of upper body	96 mm (3.8 in)	107 mm (4.2 in)
Diameter of upper body	30 mm (1.2 in)	40 mm (1.6 in)
Length of lower body	74 mm (2.9 in)	
Weight	230 g (8.1 oz)	370 g (13 oz)
Explosive content	50 g (1.8 oz)	100 g (3.5 oz)
Explosive type	50% TNT / 50% RDX	
Armor penetration	30mm	50mm
