= Type 98 320 mm mortar =

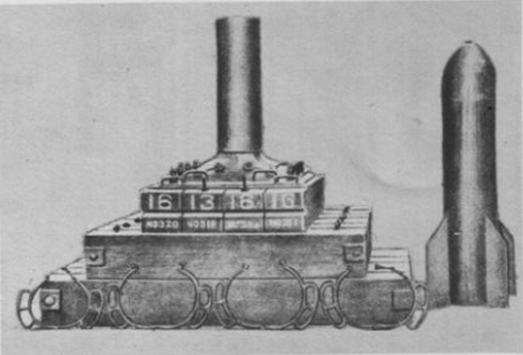
- Japanese Type 98 320 mm mortar schema
- Type: Spigot mortar
- Place of origin: Empire of Japan

Service history
- In service: 1939–1945
- Used by: Imperial Japanese Army
- Wars: World War II

Production history
- Designed: 1937–1938
- No. built: unknown

Specifications
- Shell weight: 300 kg (660 lb)
- Caliber: 320 mm (12.6 in)

The 320 mm Type 98 mortar (Japanese: 九八式臼砲, Hepburn: kyūhachi-shiki-kyūhō, literally "nine eight type mortar"), known by the nickname "Ghost rockets", was an artillery weapon used by the Japanese military throughout World War II. The Type 98 mortar was designed in the late 1930s to support assault on fortifications; however, it would see the majority of its use as a fixed weapon emplaced in gun pits for close-in defense. Productions records for the Type 98 mortar are unknown but it may have been moderate given the types use in multiple theatres.

The Type 98 mortar was first utilized during the Battle of Singapore in 1942. It later saw action during the Battle of Iwo Jima, Okinawa, and the Soviet invasion of Manchuria. According to Japanese sources its destructive firepower was roughly equivalent to a 203mm heavy conventional artillery piece.

== Specifications ==
The mortar consists of a steel tube closed at one end by a steel base-plate, which rests on a wooden platform. The 300 kg (660 lb), 1.5 m (4 ft 11 in), 330 mm (13 in) shells fit around and on top of the tube, instead of being dropped inside, making this a spigot mortar. The range of each shot was adjusted by adding different size powder charges at the base of the round. The barrels could handle only five or six shots apiece before becoming damaged and unusable. When used in large groups, as was often done, it produced a fearsome effect known as the "screaming missile" to U.S. Marines. To absorb the massive recoil caused by firing their projectiles, the mortar tubes were almost always placed up against a mound of dirt.

== Use ==
During World War II the Type 98 was first deployed during the Battle of Singapore. The Japanese Imperial Army deployed somewhere between one and two dozen 320 mm mortars on Iwo Jima, as well as two dozen on Bataan. The weapon was also used on Okinawa. One Type 98 was captured by British forces at Imphal. According to Japanese sources the Type 98 was utilized against Soviet forces during the 1945 invasion of Manchuria.

=== Iwo Jima ===
Japanese officers believed the 320 mm spigot mortar's most effective method of employment was to inflict psychological damage on the American troops instead of inflicting casualties. The 300 kg (660 lb) shells left craters 2.5 m (8 ft 2 in) deep and 4.5 m (15 ft) wide, but caused relatively few casualties due to minimal fragmentation. The mortars were operated mainly by the 20th Independent Mortar Battalion.

During the Iwo Jima campaign, many of the 12 to 24 launchers were placed inside the mouths of caves to protect them from American artillery bombardment, requiring the gun crews to live in the caves that housed their guns, like the infantry. Due to the relative difficulty involved in moving such a massive weapon system, their locations usually remained fixed during battles.

== Photo Gallery ==
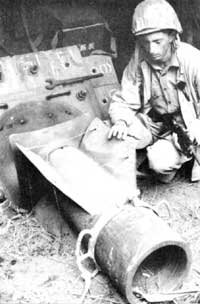
Japanese Type 98 mortar base-plate and 320 mm mortar shell (minus warhead) captured during the Battle of Iwo Jima.

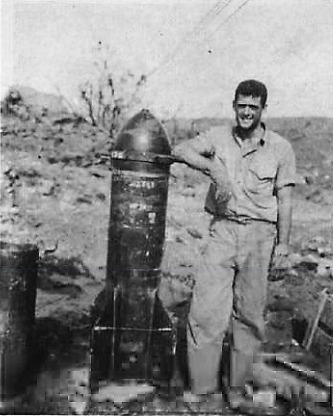
A complete 320 mm mortar shell captured during the Battle of Iwo Jima.

== Bibliography ==
- Alexander, Joseph. "CLOSING IN: Marines in the Seizure of Iwo Jima". Archived from the original on 24 January 2009.
- Journal of the United States Artillery. United States Coast Artillery Training Center, Fort Monroe, VA. 1919. p. 460.
- "Japanese Antitank Tactics" (PDF). Archived from the original (PDF) on 27 March 2009.
- "The High Cost of Faulty Intel -Page 2". Military.com. February 2005. p. 2. Archived from the original on 10 March 2009.
- Appleman, Roy E.; James M. Burns; Russell A. Gugeler; John Stevens. "Chapter IV: Where Is The Enemy". CENTER OF MILITARY HISTORY, UNITED STATES ARMY. Archived from the original on 13 January 2009.
- Clancy, Patrick (1954). "HyperWar: Iwo Jima: Amphibious Epic (Chapter 4)". Hyper War. Archived from the original on 1 March 2009.
- "History". Durr International. Archived from the original on 10 January 2008.
