= 120 mm Krupp howitzer M1905 =

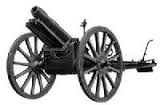
- Type: Howitzer
- Place of origin: German Empire

Service history
- Used by: Imperial Japanese Army; Ottoman Empire
- Wars: World War I

Production history
- Designer: Krupp
- Designed: 1905
- Manufacturer: Krupp

Specifications
- Mass: 1,125 kg (2,480 lb)
- Barrel length: 1.445 m (4 ft 9 in) L/12
- Shell: 120 x 147mm R
- Shell weight: 20 kg (44 lb)
- Caliber: 120 mm (4.72 in)
- Breech: Horizontal sliding-block
- Recoil: Hydro-spring
- Carriage: Box trail
- Elevation: 0° to +42°
- Traverse: 5°
- Muzzle velocity: 275 m/s (900 ft/s)
- Maximum firing range: 5.8 km (3.6 mi)

The 120 mm Krupp howitzer M1905 was a howitzer used by Turkey, Japan and a few smaller armies including during World War I. After the Ottoman Empire entered World War I in 1914 on the side of the Central Powers, it realized that it needed to modernize its artillery. The Model 1905 was a "stock gun" from Krupp that could be supplied from parts on hand on short notice, with minor alterations to suit customers' needs. The Model 1905 was a conventional artillery piece for its time, except for the lack of a gun shield to protect the crew. This was not a major liability, as most artillery quickly moved into concealed positions after the first few months of war.

== Bibliography ==
- Hogg, Ian. (2000). Twentieth-Century Artillery. New York: Barnes & Nobles. ISBN 0-7607-1994-2.
