= Chuhatsu-class landing craft =

Japanese landing craft

Class overview
- Name: Chuhatsu Class, Landing Craft
- Operators: during World War II: Imperial Japanese Navy

General characteristics (Chuhatsu-class landing craft)
- Type: Landing Craft
- Tonnage: 8.5 tons
- Length: 42.8 ft (13.05 m)o/a
- Beam: 9.6 ft (2.93 m)
- Draught: 2.3 ft (0.70 m)
- Speed: 8 knots (14.8 km/h)
- Capacity: 60 men or 10 tons cargo
- Complement: 6
- Armament: 1 machine gun

The Chuhatsu (中発) or 13m landing craft was a type of landing craft, used by the Imperial Japanese Navy during World War II. It was a smaller version of the Daihatsu Class, with a bow ramp that was lowered to disembark cargo upon riding up onto the beach.

It was utilised by the Imperial Japanese Navy as a liberty and supply boat for cruisers, and as a lighter for transporting aircraft.
