= 7×20mm Nambu =

Pistol cartridge

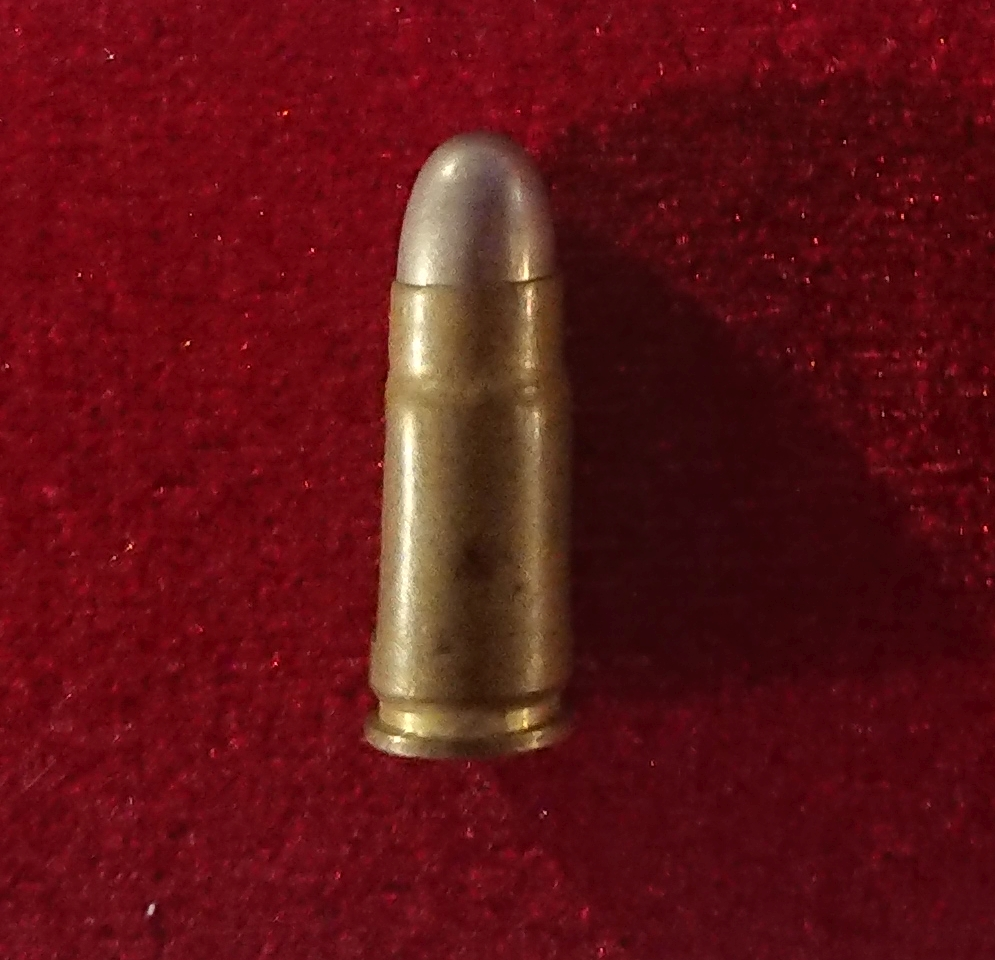
- 7×20mm Baby Nambu
- Type: Pistol
- Place of origin: Japan

Service history
- In service: 1903–1945
- Used by: Japan
- Wars: World War II

Production history
- Designer: Kijiro Nambu
- Designed: 1902
- Manufacturer: Type B Nambu Pistol 1. Tokyo Artillery Arsenal, Koishigawa, Tokyo 1903–1923 and 2. Tokyo Gas and Electric Co., Ltd., Tokyo 1923–1929. Was ammunition made in the same factories?
- No. built: Pistols - Possibly less than 6,500. 1. Tokyo c. 5,900 and 2. TGE c. 550. Number of 7×20mm rounds made is unknown but today they are a quite rare collector's item occasionally found in WW2 boxes of 50 rounds.
- Variants: At least 5, including a dummy. Variations mainly occur in type of bullet crimping, jacket type and rim thickness.

Specifications
- Case type: Bottleneck rimless
- Bullet diameter: 7.08 mm (0.279 in)
- Neck diameter: 7.64 mm (0.301 in)
- Shoulder diameter: 8.62 mm (0.339 in)
- Base diameter: 8.91 mm (0.351 in)
- Rim diameter: 9.11 mm (0.359 in)
- Rim thickness: 0.98 mm (0.039 in)
- Case length: 19.80 mm (0.780 in)
- Overall length: 26.80 mm (1.055 in)
- Primer type: Small pistol

Ballistic performance
Bullet mass/type	Velocity	Energy
56 gr (4 g) FMJ	240 m/s (790 ft/s)	108 J (80 ft⋅lbf)
- Test barrel length: 83 mm (3.25 in)

The 7×20mm Nambu is a rimless, bottleneck handgun cartridge designed in Japan for use in the Type B or "Baby" model Nambu pistol. The cartridge is a scaled-down version of the 8×22mm Nambu used in all other Nambu pistol models. It has a muzzle energy greater than that of the .25 ACP and closer to the .32 ACP.
