= Type 98 20 mm AA half-track vehicle =

Type 98 20 mm AA half-track
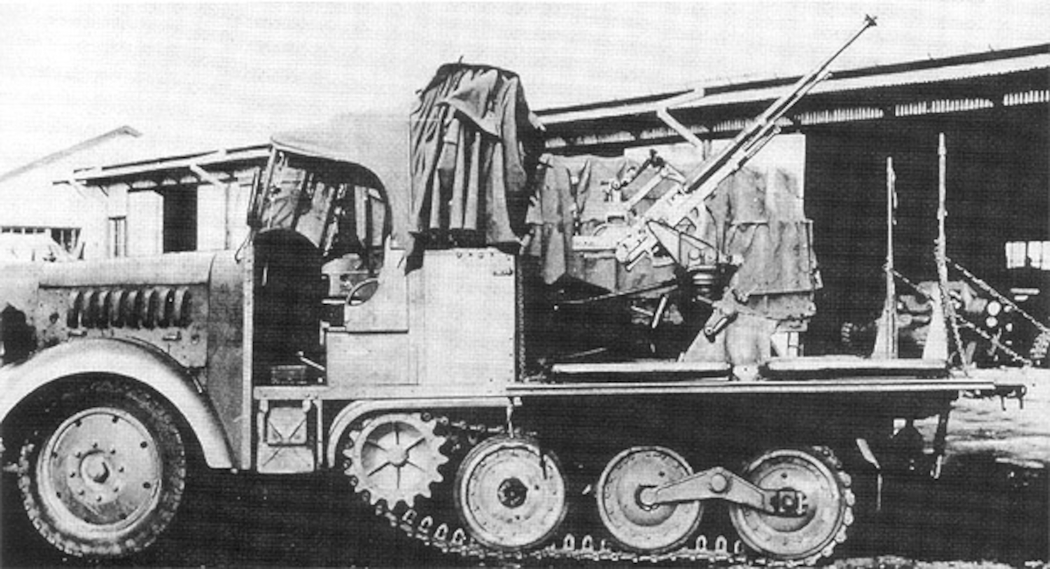
- Type: Self-propelled anti-aircraft gun
- Place of origin: Empire of Japan

Specifications
- Mass: 5 ton
- Length: 5.3 m (17 ft)
- Width: 2.0 m (6.6 ft)
- Height: 2.2 m (7.2 ft)
- Crew: 15
- Main armament: Type 98 20 mm AA machine cannon
- Engine: air-cooled diesel 110 PS (81 kW)
- Power/weight: 32.5 HP/tonne
- Suspension: bellcrank
- Operational range: 200 km
- Maximum speed: 30 mph (48 km/h)

The Type 98 20 mm AA half-track vehicle was an experimental Japanese self-propelled anti-aircraft gun. It had a single 20 mm Type 98 AA machine cannon mounted on the back section of a Type 98 Ko-Hi half-tracked prime mover. The Type 98 Ko-Hi half-track was first manufactured in 1938.

The Type 98 half-tracks were considered "high speed" prime movers, capable of 48 km/h (30 mph) when loaded. It was powered by a diesel engine and had a crew of 15. The rear-mounted Type 98 20 mm AA autocannon was the most common light anti-aircraft gun of the Imperial Japanese Army. It had a range of 5,500 m (18,000 ft), altitude of 3,500 m (11,500 ft) and could fire up to 300 rounds per minute. The Type 98 20 mm AA half-track vehicle was not mass-produced.

== See also ==
- 20 mm AA machine cannon carrier
- Type 98 Ta-Se
- Type 98 20 mm AAG tank
