= Type 98 20 mm AAG tank =

Type 98 anti-aircraft gun tank
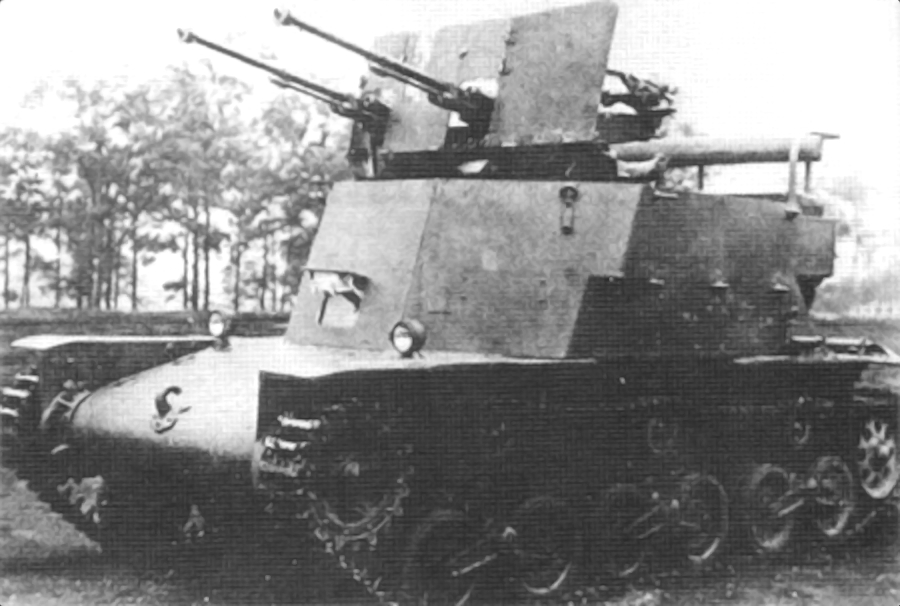
- Place of origin: Empire of Japan

Production history
- No. built: 1 prototype

Specifications
- Mass: 22 tons
- Length: 4.78 m (15 ft 8 in)
- Width: 2.19 m (7 ft 2 in)
- Height: 2.58 m (8 ft 6 in)
- Crew: 5
- Armor: 6–16 mm
- Main armament: 2x Type 2 20 mm AA machine cannon
- Engine: petrol 130hp
- Suspension: bellcrank
- Operational range: 300 km (190 mi)
- Maximum speed: 42 km/h (26 mph)

The Type 98 20 mm AAG (anti-air gun) tank (Japanese: 試製対空戦車 ソキ) was a Japanese self-propelled anti-aircraft gun using a twin Soki Type 2 20 mm anti-air gun. It utilized the chassis of the Type 98 Ke-Ni light tank.

== History and development ==
=== Original single gun variant ===
During development of an AA gun tank, the Imperial Japanese Army experimented with various configurations. In November 1941, development began on an anti-aircraft gun tank based on the Type 98 Ke-Ni light tank chassis with a 20 mm AA gun. A prototype AA gun tank was produced and designated the Type 98 Ta-Se self-propelled anti-aircraft gun. It mounted a single converted Type 98 20 mm AA machine cannon in a cylindrical turret. During trials, it was determined that the configuration created an unstable "firing platform" and so it did not enter production.

=== Twin gun version ===
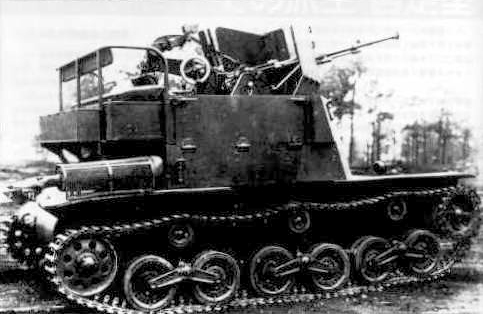
Rear angle view of the Type 98 20 mm AAG tank with twin Type 2 machine cannon

This prototype version, known as the Type 98 20 mm AAG tank was equipped with a modified twin Type 2 20 mm AA machine cannon. The twin gun was similar to the Type 98 anti-aircraft cannon, but these could be elevated to 95 degrees and had a central fire-control system. The rate of fire was 300 rpm, and they had a maximum range of 5,500 m.

The gun crew worked from a raised platform with a modest amount of protection from the sides; the pivoting twin 20 mm gun fired through a large gun shield that gave further protection for the crew from that direction. The gunner sat in the seat right behind the gun. The platform allowed 360 degrees of rotation for both the gunner and the gun. A Type 100 air-cooled inline six-cylinder diesel engine was used to output 130 horsepower. Forward transmission included four stages, with one reverse speed. The Type 98 Ke-Ni chassis and engine, on which the prototype was based, managed a speed of 42 km/h. It also did not enter mass production. In addition, no single AA gun configuration of the AAG tank was produced.

== See also ==
- Type 98 20 mm AA half-track vehicle
- 20 mm AA machine cannon carrier truck
