= Type 38 12 cm howitzer =

Japanese Type 38 12 cm howitzer
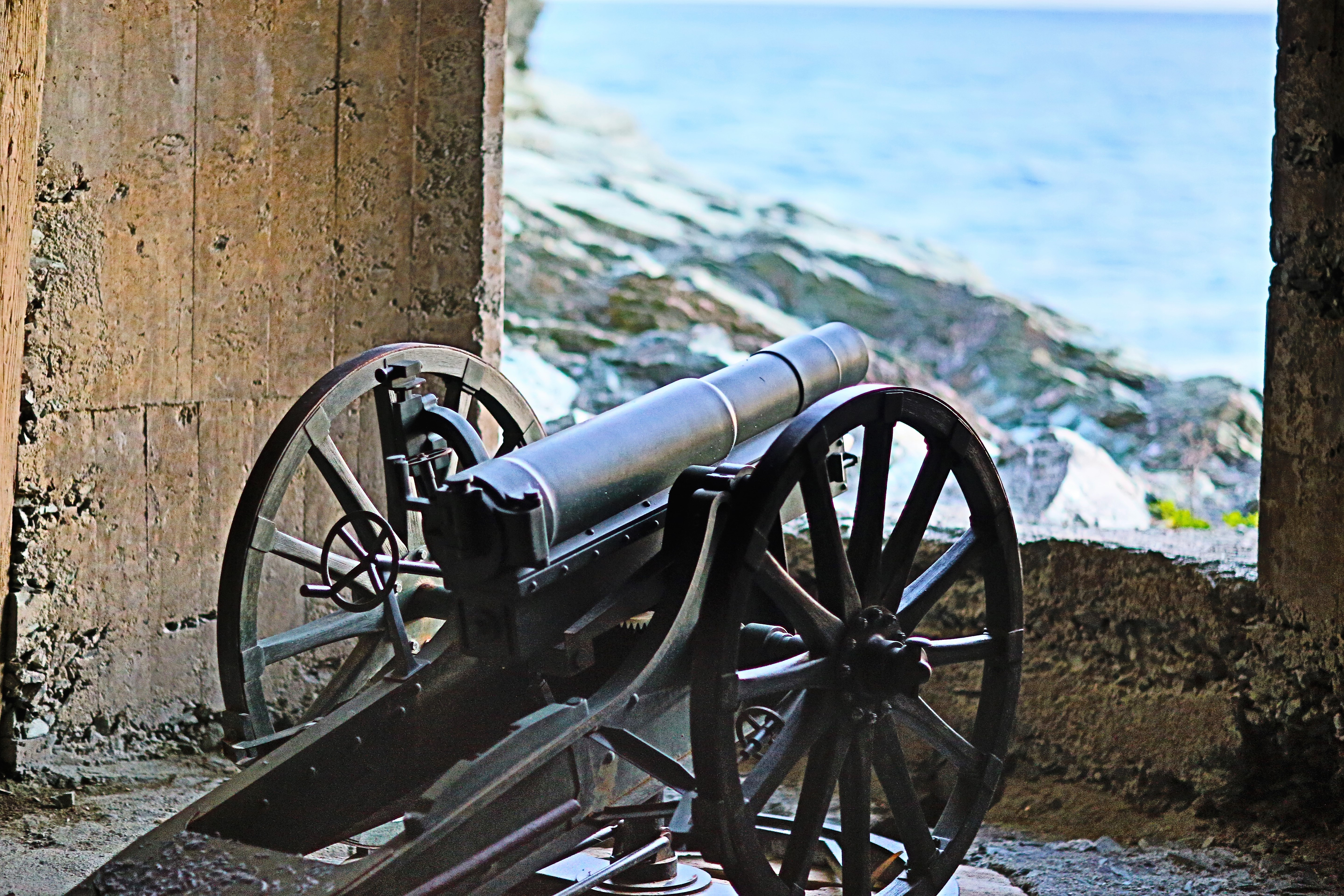
- Type 38 120mm Howitzer of the 4th Battery at Geiyo Fortress in Ehime Prefecture.
- Type: Howitzer
- Place of origin: Empire of Japan

Service history
- In service: 1905–1945?
- Used by: Imperial Japanese Army
- Wars: World War I Second Sino-Japanese War; World War II

Production history
- No. built: 187

Specifications
- Mass: Travel: 2,164 kg (4,771 lb); Firing: 1,260 kg (2,770 lb)
- Length: Travel: 4.90 m (16 ft 1 in); Firing: 3.76 m (12 ft 4 in)
- Barrel length: 1.32 m (4 ft 4 in)
- Width: 1.47 m (4 ft 10 in)
- Height: 1.80 m (5 ft 11 in)
- Caliber: 120 mm (4.72 in)
- Breech: Interrupted screw
- Recoil: Hydro-spring
- Carriage: Box trail
- Elevation: -5° to +43°
- Traverse: -2° to +2°
- Muzzle velocity: 276 m/s (910 ft/s)
- Maximum firing range: 5.6 km (3.5 mi)

The Type 38 12 cm howitzer (1905) is an obsolete Japanese field piece used by the Imperial Japanese Army during World War I, Second Sino-Japanese War, and World War II. The Type 38 designation was given to this gun as it was accepted in the 38th year of Emperor Meiji's reign (1905). It was encountered by Allied forces for the first time on Iwo Jima, and it may have been used as an emergency or substitute weapon.

== Description ==
It is characterized by a very short barrel, box trail, and large wooden wheels. It has an interrupted screw breech block and Hydro-spring recoil-mechanism. No gun shield is used with this weapon.

Elevating and traversing hand wheels, and panoramic sight are at the left of the breech. The firing mechanism is a lanyard actuated percussion type.

Armor-piercing, Armor-piercing High Explosive, HEAT, and Shrapnel shells have been recovered. The projectiles have the usual color markings and are similar in appearance to 75mm APHE and shrapnel shells. The APHE shell weighs 20 kg (44 lb) while the shrapnel shell contains 300 lead balls.

== Gallery ==
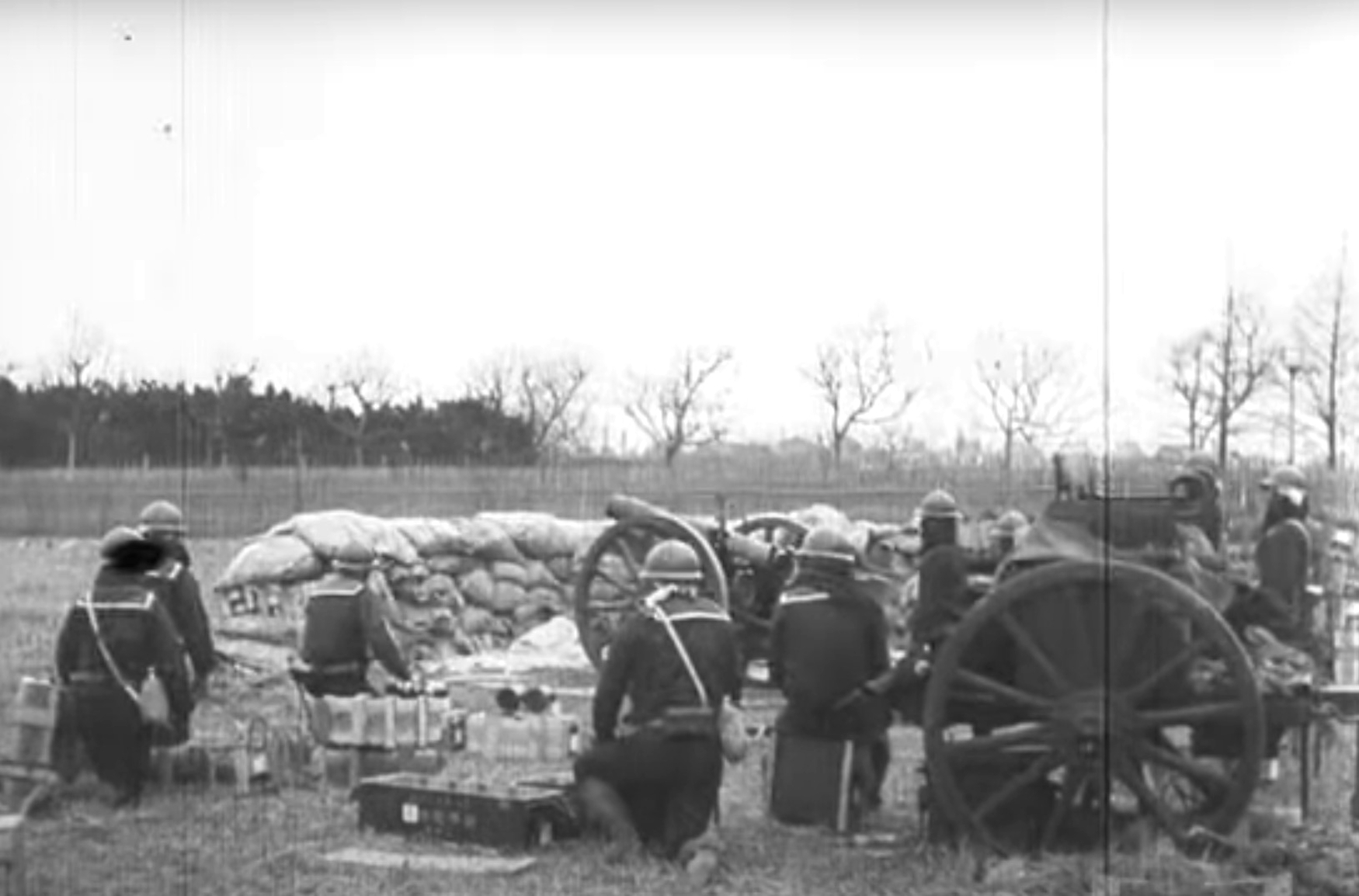
Naval Type 38 12-cm-howitzer, Shanghai 1932

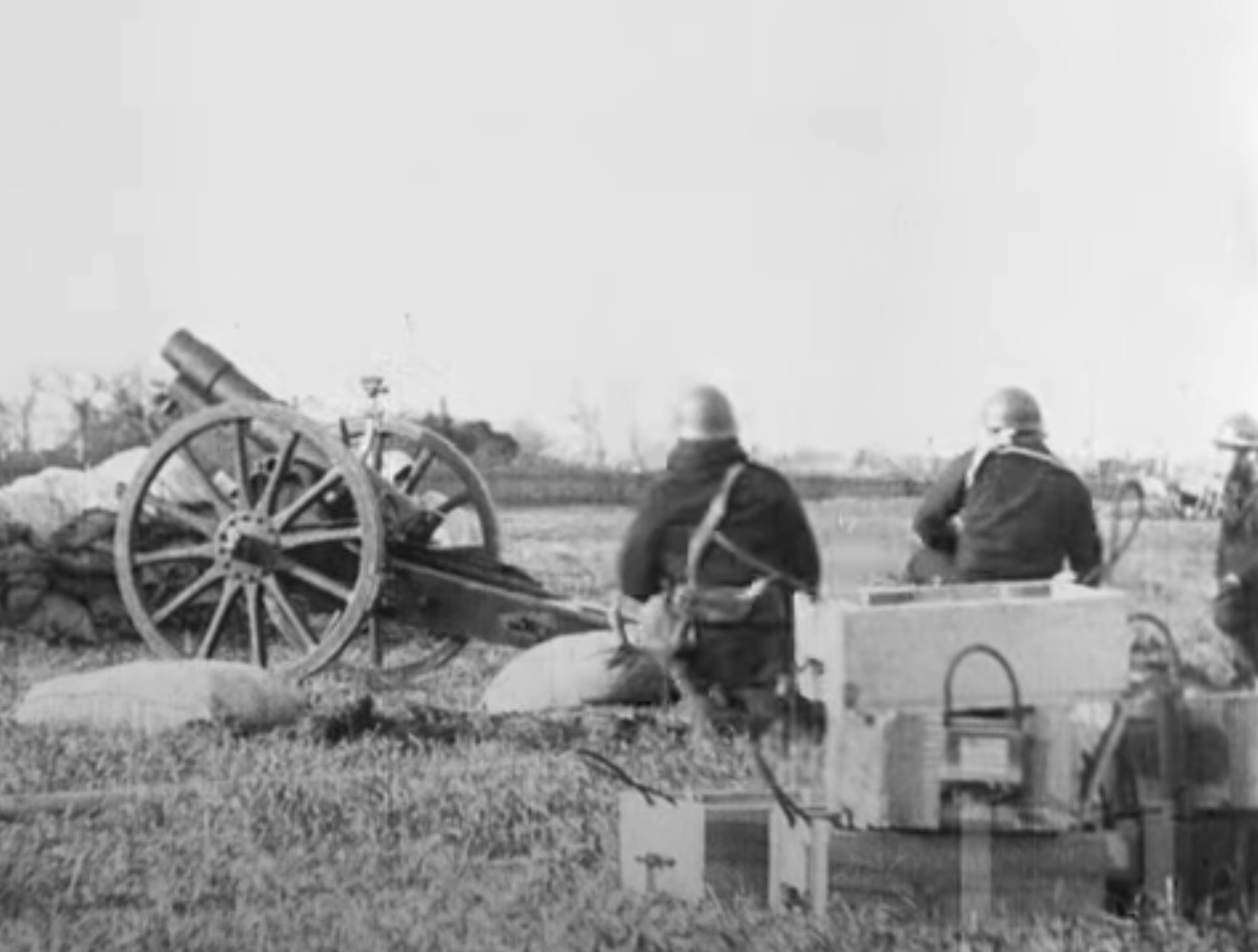
Naval Type 38 12-cm-howitzer with high firing angle, Shanghai 1932
