= Type 94 disinfecting vehicle and Type 94 gas scattering vehicle =

Type 94 disinfecting and gas scattering vehicle
- Type: Armored military vehicle (chemical/biological warfare)
- Place of origin: Empire of Japan

Service history
- Used by: Imperial Japanese Army

Production history
- Designed: 1933/34

Specifications
- Armor: 8–12 mm (.47 in)
- Engine: Mitsubishi Franklin air-cooled inline 4-cylinder gasoline
- Suspension: 2-wheel bogie

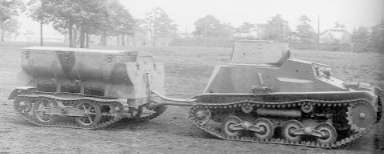
Type 94 disinfecting vehicle

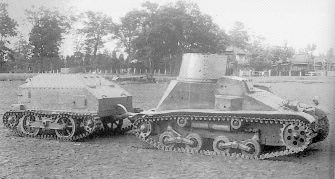
Type 94 gas scattering vehicle

The Type 94 disinfecting vehicle and Type 94 gas scattering vehicle were variants of the Type 94 tankette adapted to chemical warfare by the Imperial Japanese Army. The Type 94 disinfecting vehicle and Type 94 gas scattering vehicle were configured as either an independent mobile liquid dissemination chemical vehicle or a respective mobile disinfecting anti-chemical agents vehicle to support the Japanese chemical infantry units in combat.

== Operation ==
These special vehicles for chemical warfare were developed in 1933–1934. The Type 94 tankette was modified and used as a "tractor"; closed for protection against these agents. It pulled either a configured independent tracked mobile liquid dissemination chemical vehicle or a respective tracked mobile disinfecting anti-chemical agents vehicle.

The gas scattering vehicle version could scatter a mustard gas chemical agent within an 8 m width and the disinfecting vehicle version scattered "bleaching powder to counteract the poison gas" or pathogenic agents.

In a similar way, the Soviet Red Army developed chemical and biological warfare special protection armored vehicles, including using medium or light tanks with modified turrets with dispersers or gas scatterers, liquid or powder dissemination systems and special armor protection against agents for their respective chemical and biological units in the years prior to and during World War II. (Note: Though the Soviets tested at least one experimental chemical tank based on a heavy tank chassis, the KV-12 (Object 232).) One example of this was the chemical and flame tank versions of the T-26. Other major powers also had their own versions of vehicles designed to deliver chemical and biological weapons on the battlefield, usually using light or infantry tanks as their basis.

Also produced for the Imperial Japanese Army were the Type 97 disinfecting vehicle and Type 97 gas scattering vehicle. They were based on the Type 97 Te-Ke tankette chassis, but had Type 94 turrets. They operated in the same way as the Type 94 tankette-based versions. They used the same type of towed liquid dissemination chemical vehicle trailer or tracked mobile disinfecting anti-chemical agents vehicle trailer as the Type 94 versions.

== See also ==
- Teletank
