= Type 4 20 mm twin AA machine cannon =

Type 4 20mm twin AA machine cannon
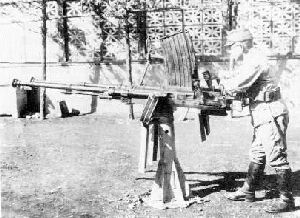
- Type: Autocannon
- Place of origin: Empire of Japan

Service history
- In service: 1944–1945
- Used by: Japan
- Wars: World War II

Production history
- No. built: approximately 500 (an alternate source states 616 units produced)

Specifications
- Barrel length: 1.4 m (4 ft 7 in) L/70
- Shell: 20×142 mm
- Caliber: 20 mm (0.79 in)
- Action: Gas operated
- Rate of fire: 600 rounds/min (maximum)
- Muzzle velocity: 950 m/s
- Maximum firing range: 5,500 m (18,000 ft) (horizontal); 3,500 m (11,500 ft) (altitude)
- Feed system: 2x 20 round box

Type 4 20 mm twin AA machine cannon was an Imperial Japanese Army (IJA) anti-aircraft gun. It consisted of two Type 98 20 mm AA machine cannon. It was introduced in 1944 and approximately 500 to 616 guns were produced. It was mainly designed for use against ground targets, but was only used in an anti-aircraft role.

The Type 98 20 mm AA machine cannon was the most common light anti-aircraft gun of the Japanese military and the IJA used it until the end of World War II.
