= 20 mm AA machine cannon carrier truck =

Type 98 20 mm AA machine cannon carrier
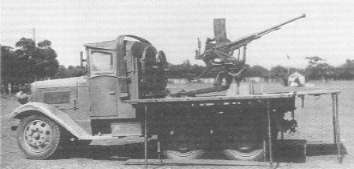
- Place of origin: Empire of Japan

Specifications
- Mass: 5.3 tons
- Length: 5.40m
- Width: 1.90m
- Main armament: Type 98 20 mm AA machine cannon
- Engine: air-cooled diesel 70 hp
- Suspension: wheeled
- Operational range: 200 km
- Maximum speed: 60 km

The AA machine cannon carrier truck was a self-propelled anti-aircraft gun of the Imperial Japanese Army. It consisted of the Type 98 20 mm AA machine cannon mounted on the back of a Type 94 six-wheeled truck. The Type 94 truck was first produced in 1934 by Isuzu, and used for prototypes. It was known to be reliable and was produced in "large numbers".

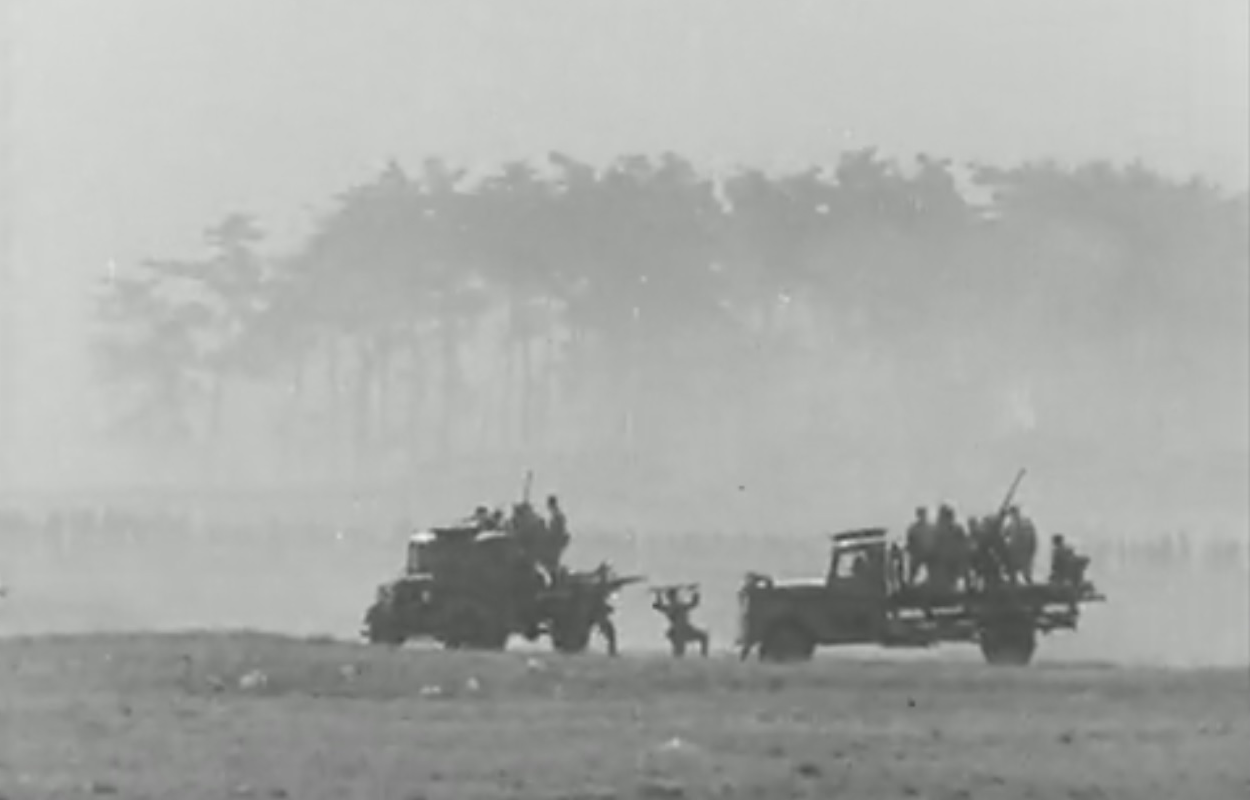
Type 98 20 mm anti-aircraft machine cannon carrier trucks

The Type 98 20 mm AA autocannon was the most common light anti-aircraft gun of the Imperial Japanese Army. It had a range of 5,500 meters, altitude of 3,500 meters and could fire up to 300 rounds per minute. The gun could be fired from the rear platform of the truck or be unloaded and fired from the ground. These carrier trucks were deployed in the air defense units of the four Japanese tank divisions.

== See also ==
- Type 98 20 mm AA half-track vehicle
- Type 98 Ta-Se
- Type 98 20 mm AAG tank
