= Type 2 20 mm AA machine cannon =

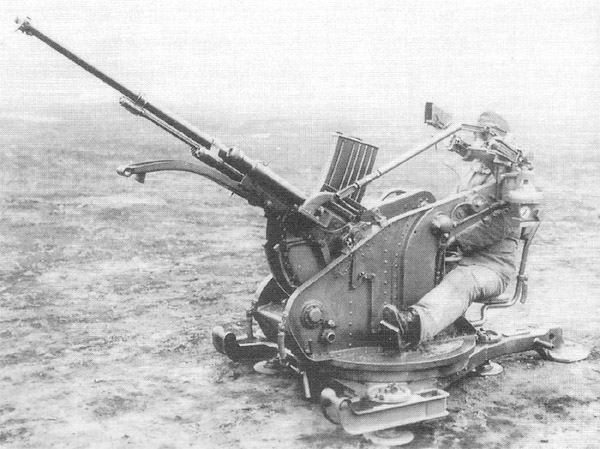
- Type: Autocannon
- Place of origin: Empire of Japan

Service history
- In service: 1942–1945
- Used by: Imperial Japanese Army
- Wars: World War II

Production history
- Produced: 1942–1945
- No. built: 16
- Variants: 20 mm Twin AA machine cannon

Specifications
- Mass: 550 kg (1,210 lb)
- Barrel length: 1.4 m (4 ft 7 in) L/70
- Shell: 20 x 142 mm
- Caliber: 20 mm (0.79 in)
- Barrels: 1
- Action: Gas operated
- Elevation: -15° to +95°
- Traverse: 360°
- Rate of fire: 420 to 480 rounds/min (maximum)
- Muzzle velocity: 950 m/s (3,100 ft/s)
- Maximum firing range: 5,500 m (18,000 ft) (horizontal); 3,500 m (11,500 ft) (altitude)
- Feed system: 20 round box

The Type 2 20 mm AA machine cannon was a Japanese-designed anti-aircraft gun. It entered service in 1942.

== Design ==
Introduced in 1942, compared to the earlier Type 98 20 mm AA machine cannon, Type 2 20 mm had higher maximum rate of fire, could be elevated to 95 degrees and had a central fire-control system. The central fire-control system developed for the Type 2 could control and direct six of the guns at once. The gun was based on the German 2 cm Flak 30/38/Flakvierling. It was driven by electric motors, obtaining its power from a generator trailer. The Type 2 number was designated for the year the gun was accepted, 2602 in the Japanese imperial year calendar, or 1942 in the Gregorian calendar.

== Variant ==
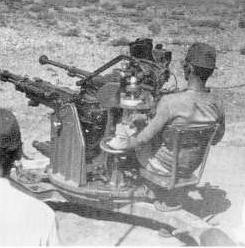
Type 2 20 mm twin AA machine cannon

Two of the guns mounted together formed a variant known as the Type 2 20 mm twin AA machine cannon. The prototype Type 98 20 mm AAG tank was equipped with this twin Type 2 variant as its main armament. The Type 98 20 mm AAG tank did not enter production.
