= Type 14 10 cm AA gun =

Imperial Japanese Army anti-aircraft gun

Japanese Type 14 10cm AA gun
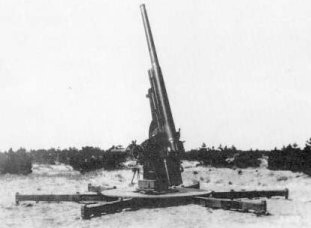
- Type 14 10 cm AA gun
- Type: Anti-aircraft gun
- Place of origin: Empire of Japan

Service history
- In service: 1925–1945
- Used by: Imperial Japanese Army
- Wars: Second Sino-Japanese War; World War II

Production history
- Designed: 1925
- No. built: 70

Specifications
- Mass: 5.194 ton
- Barrel length: 4.2 m (13 ft 9 in) L/40
- Shell: 105 x 565mm .R
- Caliber: 105 mm (4.1 in)
- Barrels: single
- Breech: Sliding-block
- Recoil: Hydro-pneumatic
- Elevation: 0° to +85°
- Traverse: 360°
- Muzzle velocity: 700 m/s (2,300 ft/s)
- Effective firing range: 10,500 m (34,400 ft)
- Maximum firing range: 16,300 m (53,500 ft)

The Type 14 10 cm AA gun (十四年式10cm高射砲, Jyūyonen-shiki jissenchi Koshahō) was an anti-aircraft gun used by the Imperial Japanese Army after World War I. The Type 14 number was designated for the year the gun was accepted, the 14th year of Emperor Taishō's reign, 1925 in the Gregorian calendar. Only a small number were produced, and it was superseded by the Type 88 75 mm AA gun in production before the start of World War II.

== History and development ==
Due to combat experience at the Battle of Tsingtao against the German Luftstreitkrafte’s fledgling squadron of combat aircraft, planners on the Imperial Japanese Army General Staff quickly realized that this new technology posed a threat which required countermeasures. This evaluation was further reinforced by reports from military observers on the European front in World War I.

After the introduction of the Type 11 75 mm AA gun into front-line combat service, the Imperial Japanese Army quickly realized that it was underpowered and lacked the range necessary for civil defense of Japanese cities from enemy air raids. A larger version, designated the Type 14 10 cm AA gun was placed into production in 1925. However, only 70 units were completed before production was terminated.

== Design ==
The Type 14 10 cm AA gun had a single piece gun barrel with a horizontal sliding breechblock, and a hydro-pneumatic recoil system mounted on a central pedestal. The firing platform was supported by six legs, each of which (along with the central pedestal) had adjustable screwed foot for leveling. The gun came with detachable wheels for transport, which were removed when in the firing position. Thirty to 45 minutes were required to prepare the gun for action.

It fired a 16 kilograms (35 lb) projectile to an effective altitude of 10,500 metres (34,400 ft), which was a dramatic improvement over the Type 11 75 mm AA gun, but its rate of fire was still slow, and units were later retrofitted with an autoloader.

== Combat record ==
All of the Type 14 10 cm AA guns were assigned to the IJA 4th Anti-Aircraft Artillery Division, based in Kyūshū during the Pacific War. Some units were based in Kyūshū cities for defense against American air raids, but most were based at the Yawata Steel Works in Kitakyūshū city.
