= Type 94 90 mm infantry mortar =

Japanese army weapon of the 1930s

Type 94 90 mm mortar
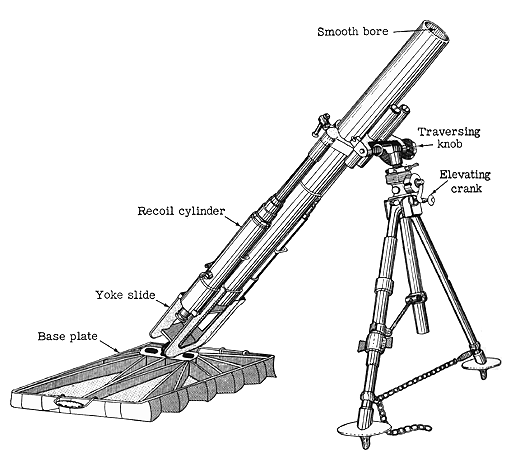
- Japanese Type 94 90 mm mortar
- Place of origin: Empire of Japan

Service history
- Used by: Imperial Japanese Army
- Wars: World War II

Production history
- Produced: 1934-1940
- No. built: 518

Specifications
- Mass: 159 kg (350.5 lb)
- Barrel length: 1.27 m (4 ft 2 in)
- Shell weight: 5.22 kg (11 lb 8 oz)
- Caliber: 90 mm (3.5 in)
- Action: Manual
- Elevation: +45 to +80 degrees
- Traverse: -29.18 to +26.5 degrees
- Muzzle velocity: 227 m/s (745 ft/s)
- Effective firing range: 3.8 km (2.4 mi)

The Type 94 90 mm mortar was a 90 mm smoothbore mortar, introduced in 1935, used by the Japanese in World War II. The Type 94 designation was given to this gun as it was accepted in the year 2594 of the Japanese calendar (1934).

Japanese 90mm, 120mm, and 150mm mortars were labeled as "trench mortars" and were effectively controlled by Imperial Japanese Army artillery units instead of infantry units. Initially Japanese trench mortars where primarily developed as chemical-delivery weapons, but would mainly see service in conventional roles during the Greater East Asia War. The Type 94 90mm mortar was replaced in production by the similar but lighter Type 97 90mm mortar, which removed unnecessary recoil mechanisms.

== Design ==
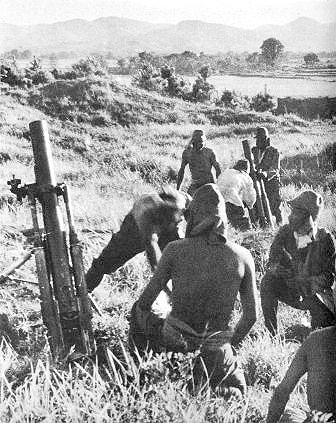
Two Type 94 infantry mortar in action.

By giving the Type 94 an especially heavy and stable mount and bipod, a massive shock absorber group, a powerful projectile, and a lengthy tube and heavy powder charge capacity for long range, Japanese designers intended the weapon to serve as a substitute field or artillery piece that could be hauled in pieces to remote locations, a useful attribute for an army short on transport as well as modern towed large-caliber field howitzers and artillery. The Type 94 had a range of some 4000 yards.

== Combat record ==
The Type 94 was encountered throughout the war in China. In the Pacific campaign, it was first used against U.S. forces in the Philippines, and later at the Battle of Guadalcanal. Because of its weight, it was normally employed in static siege or defense situations. Japanese forces sometimes went to great lengths to transport these heavy mortars to remote jungle locations when preparing defensive works.
