= Type 1 Ho-Ni I =

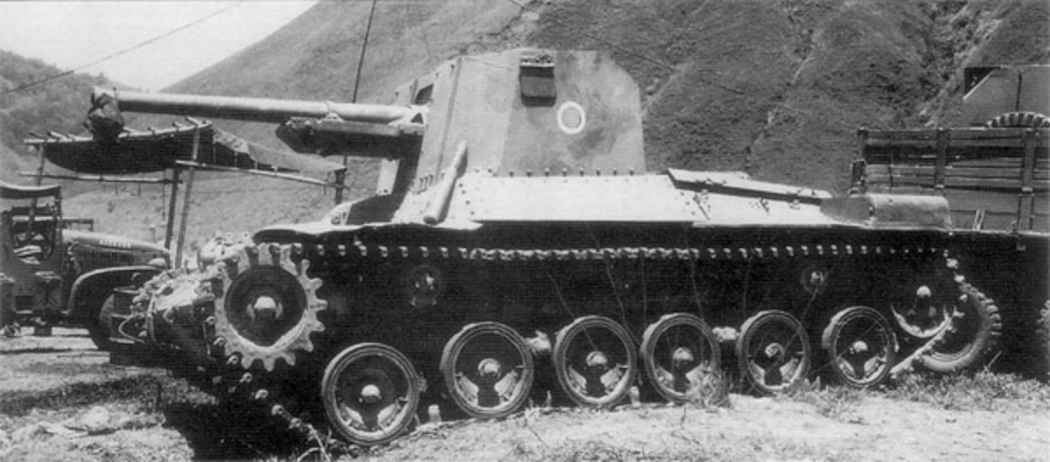
- Type 1 Ho-Ni I tank destroyer
- Type: Self-propelled anti-tank gun
- Place of origin: Empire of Japan

Production history
- Produced: 1942
- No. built: 26 of Type I 54 of Type II 31 to 41 of Type III

Specifications
- Mass: 15.4 tons
- Length: 5.9 m (19 ft 4 in)
- Width: 2.29 m (7 ft 6 in)
- Height: 2.39 m (7 ft 10 in)
- Crew: 5
- Armor: 25–51 mm
- Main armament: 75mm Type 90 gun
- Engine: Mitsubishi SA12200VD air-cooled V-12 diesel (21.7 litres); 170 hp at 2000 rpm
- Power/weight: 11.0 hp/t
- Suspension: bellcrank
- Operational range: 200 km (120 mi)
- Maximum speed: 38 km/h (24 mph)

The Type 1 gun tank Ho-Ni I (一式砲戦車 ホニ I, Isshiki ho-sensha Ho-Ni I) was a tank destroyer and self-propelled artillery developed by the Imperial Japanese Army for use during World War II in the Pacific theater. It saw limited combat action, being first deployed at the Battle of Luzon in the Philippines in 1945. There were two variant models known as the Ho-Ni II and Ho-Ni III. All three types were only produced in limited numbers.

== History and development ==
The Type 1 Ho-Ni I was the first self-propelled gun design of this particular type. They were meant to be self-propelled artillery and tank destroyers for armored divisions. The plan was for the Type 1 Ho-Ni I gun tank to form part of a fire support company in each of the tank regiments. The first conversion took place in June, 1941. The production model that followed had a larger fighting compartment due to enlarged side armor plates. Further, the periscope and rangefinder were removed and the gun mantlet was revised. Production of the Type 1 Ho-Ni I took place during 1942. Only a total of 26 Type 1 Ho-Ni I units were produced.

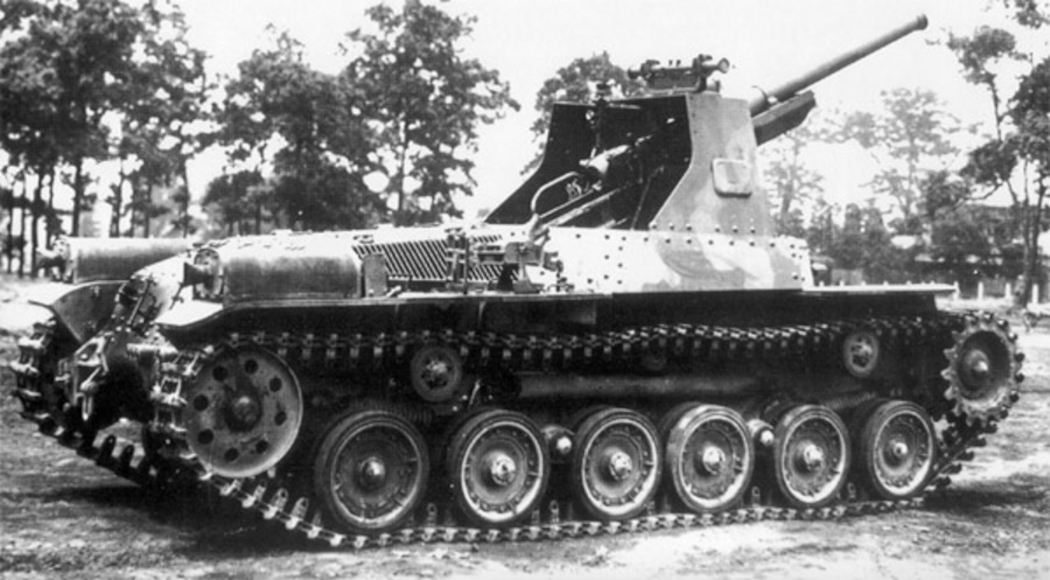
Prototype Type 1 Ho-Ni I

The Type 1 Ho-Ni I was developed by using the existing Type 97 chassis and engine, and replacing the gun turret with a Type 90 75 mm field gun mounted in an open casemate with frontal and side armour only. The gun could elevate from -5 to +25 degrees; the gun mounting could also traverse up to 20 degrees either side, so the entire vehicle did not have to be turned. The Type 1 Ho-Ni I carried 54 rounds of ammunition.

They were designed to operate as self-propelled artillery at ranges of up to 12,000 metres (7.5 mi). The design had no provision for a defensive machine gun, which together with the open structure made it vulnerable in close combat.

The Type 97 chassis, suspension and diesel engine were used unchanged. The Type 90 75 mm field gun was protected on three sides by 51 mm thick armored plate. The hull armored plate was 25 mm on the sides and 20 mm on the rear.

== Variants ==
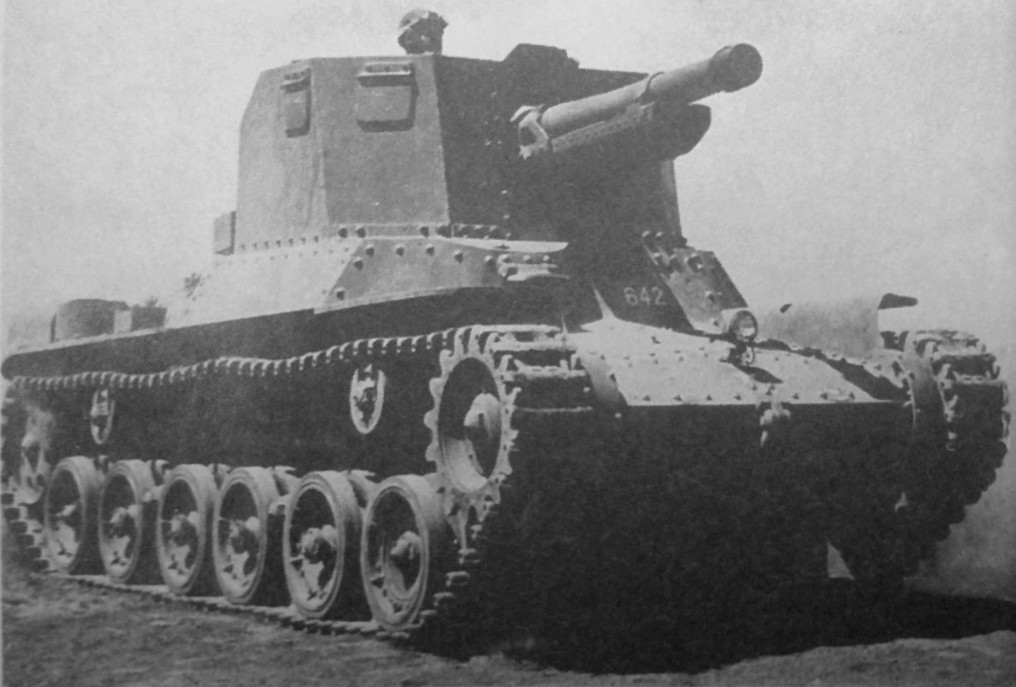
Type 1 Ho-Ni II

The Type 1 Ho-Ni II was one variant. It mounted a Type 91 105 mm howitzer and had a slightly changed superstructure as far as the design of the side armor with re-positioned observation visors. The main gun could traverse 10 degrees to each side, but only had an elevation of 22 degrees due to the recoil of the gun. A prototype was built in July, 1942. Production of the Type 1 Ho-Ni II did not begin until 1943. A total of 54 units were produced.

The other variant was the Type 3 Ho-Ni III, which mounted a Type 3 75 mm tank gun in a completely enclosed armored casemate to address the issue of crew protection in close combat. The welded superstructure had sloped armor and the gun mount had additional stamped armor plate. A total of 31 to 41 units were produced through March 1945.

== Combat history ==
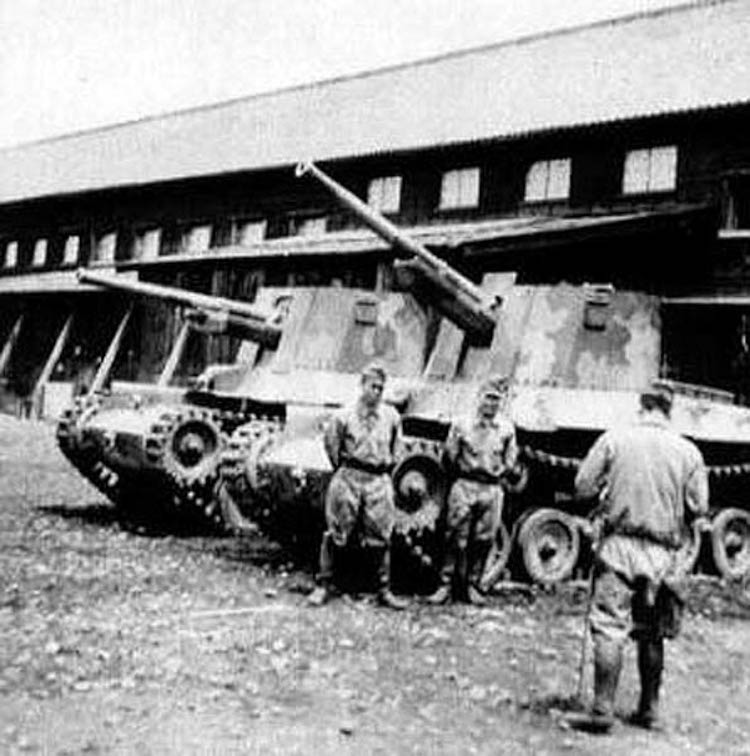
Type 1 Ho-Ni I gun tanks

The Type 1 Ho-Ni I was first deployed in combat at the Battle of Luzon in the Philippines in 1945, with some deployed in static entrenched positions. However, like the rest of the Japanese armor of the 2nd Tank Division, they were defeated in action against superior US Army forces. In addition, the Type 1 Ho-Ni were not available in sufficient numbers to make an impact on the Battle of the Philippines. Type 1 Ho-Ni were also used by the Japanese Army in Burma during the Burma campaign.

The Type 1 Ho-Ni I was produced in small quantities in 1942, when it was superseded by the Type 1 Ho-Ni II and then the Type 3 Ho-Ni III. The total number produced of all three types in the Ho-Ni series were 111 units. Most of the Ho-Ni units were retained within the Japanese home islands to form part of the defenses against the projected American invasion, and did not see combat before the surrender of Japan.

== Survivors ==
A Type 1 Ho-Ni I from the IJA 2nd Tank Division, 2nd Armored Artillery Regiment was captured by the US Army 37th Infantry Division on Luzon on April 6, 1945. The vehicle is currently at the US Army Field Artillery Museum in Fort Sill, Oklahoma
