= Type 3 Ho-Ni III =

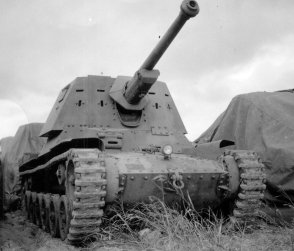
- Type 3 Ho-Ni III tank destroyer
- Type: Self-propelled anti-tank gun
- Place of origin: Empire of Japan

Production history
- No. built: 31 to 41

Specifications
- Mass: 17 tons
- Length: 5.52 m (18 ft 1 in)
- Width: 2.29 m (7 ft 6 in)
- Height: 2.39 m (7 ft 10 in)
- Crew: 5
- Armor: 12–25 mm
- Main armament: Type 3 75 mm tank gun
- Secondary armament: -
- Engine: Mitsubishi air-cooled V12 diesel 170 hp
- Power/weight: 10 hp/ton
- Suspension: bellcrank
- Operational range: 200 km (120 mi)
- Maximum speed: 38 km/h (24 mph)

The Type 3 gun tank Ho-Ni III (三式砲戦車 ホニIII, San-shiki hōsensha) was a tank destroyer and self-propelled artillery of Imperial Japanese Army in World War II. The Type 3 Ho-Ni III superseded the Type 1 Ho-Ni I and its variant the Type 1 Ho-Ni II in production, and gave better protection to the crew by having a completely enclosed superstructure. It was also meant to replace the Type 2 Ho-I for fire support.

== History and development ==
Previous gun tanks, Type 1 Ho-Ni I and Type 2 Ho-I, were not really optimized designs. Type 1 Ho-Ni I and Type 1 Ho-Ni II both used an open casemate with frontal and side armour only for the main gun, which made the crew vulnerable in close combat situations. The Type 2 Ho-I, despite its enclosed rotating turret, was armed with a low-velocity howitzer more suitable against gun emplacements and fortifications. The fully enclosed and armored casemate of the Type 3 Ho-Ni III with the more powerful Type 3 75 mm tank gun was intended to address these issues, and an order of 57 was placed with Hitachi. Although production began in 1944, it was hampered by material shortages, and by the bombing of Japan in World War II. Only 31 to 41 units were completed by the time the war ended.

== Design ==
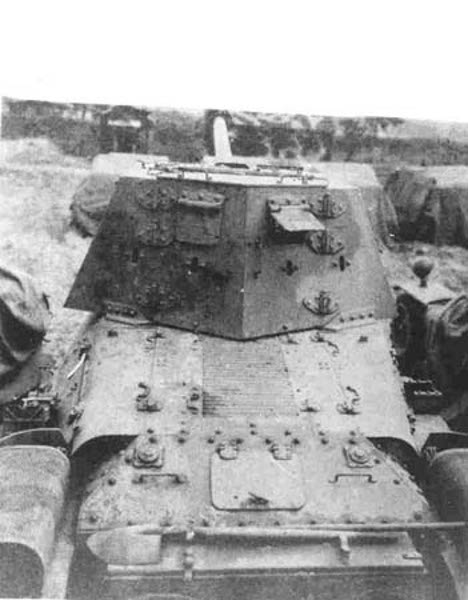
Rear view of Type 3 Ho-Ni III with its superstructure hatches closed

The Type 3 Ho-Ni III utilized the Type 97 chassis. The main armament of the Type 3 Ho-Ni III was a Type 3 75 mm tank gun, which was based on the 75 mm Type 90 field gun; the field gun itself was loosely based on the French Schneider et Cie Canon de 85 mle 1927. The Type 3 75 mm tank gun was also used in the Type 3 Chi-Nu medium tank. The Type 3 Ho-Ni III 75 mm main gun was mounted in a fully enclosed fighting compartment with its flanks protruding beyond the hull sides, giving the appearance of a gun turret, although in reality it was incapable of rotation. The welded superstructure had sloped armour and the gun mount had additional stamped armor plate. The superstructure had very small observation slits and a small observation hatch on each side. There was a top roof hatch in the superstructure and its rear armour plate formed a double hatch that opened to each side. There was no provision for secondary armament, and no front hull machine-gun.

== Service record ==
Although the Type 3 Ho-Ni III were assigned to various combat units, most were stationed within the Japanese home islands to defend against the projected Allied Invasion. As the surrender of Japan occurred before that planned invasion, there is no record of the Type 3 Ho-Ni III being used in actual combat.

== Tanks of comparable role, performance and era ==
- Germany: Marder II, Marder III, StuG III
- Great Britain: Archer
- Hungary: Toldi Páncélvadász
- Italy: Semovente 75/34
- Japan: Type 1 Ho-Ni I
- Romania: TACAM T-60, TACAM R-2
- Soviet Union: SU-76
- Sweden: Ikv 72, Pvkv m/43
- United States: M10 GMC and M18 Hellcat
