= Tank destroyer =

Anti-tank type of armoured fighting vehicle

Tank destroyer
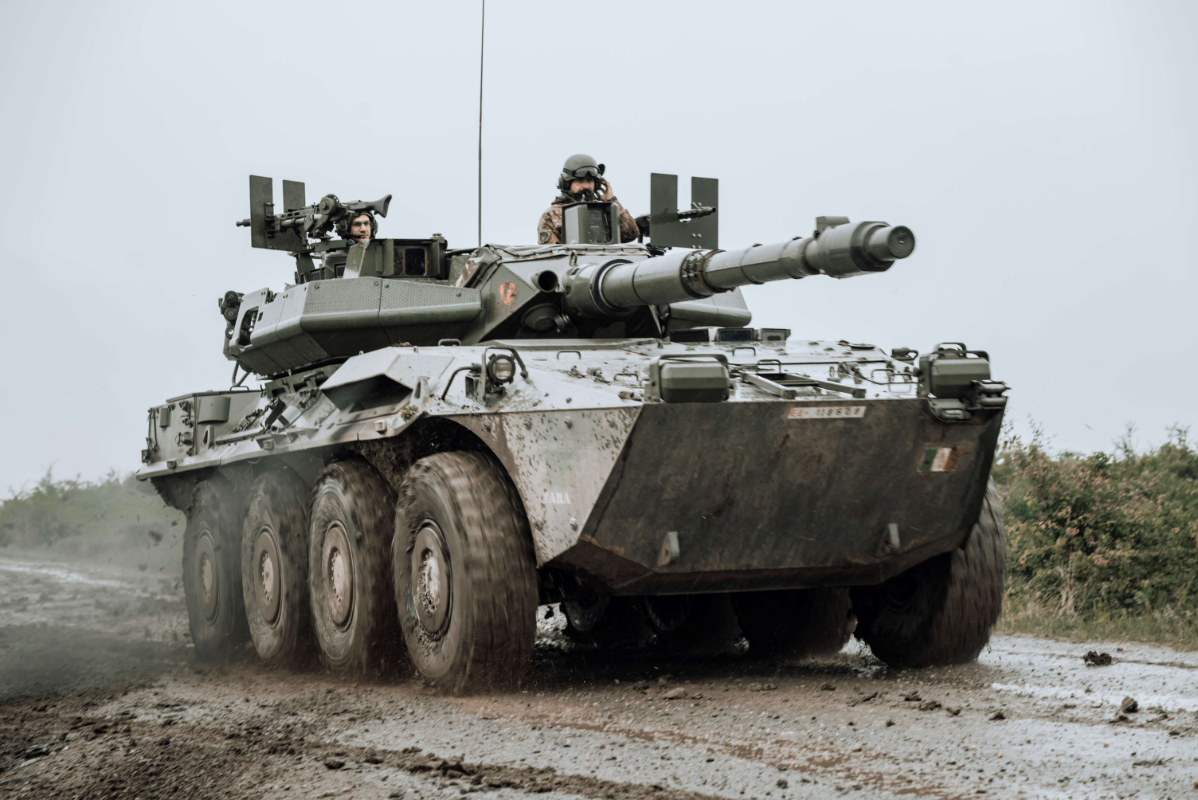
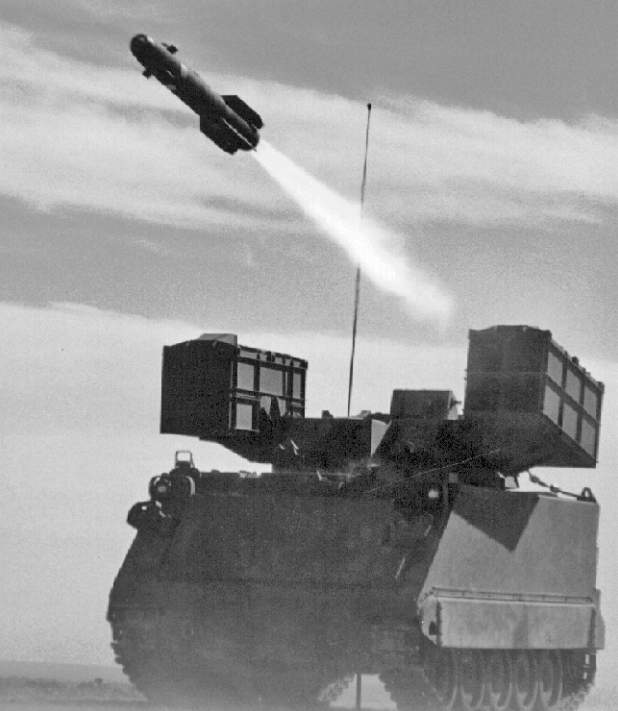
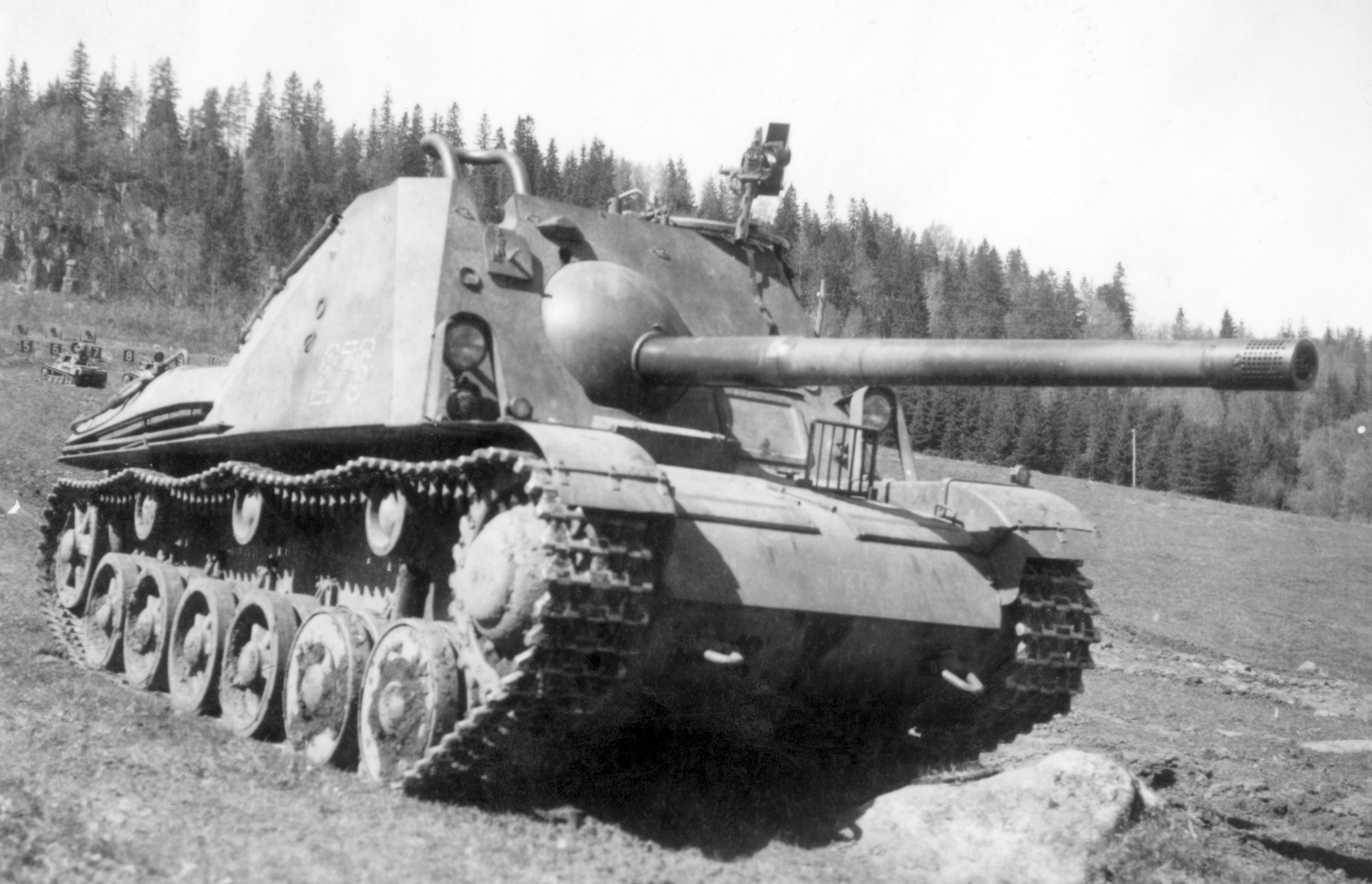
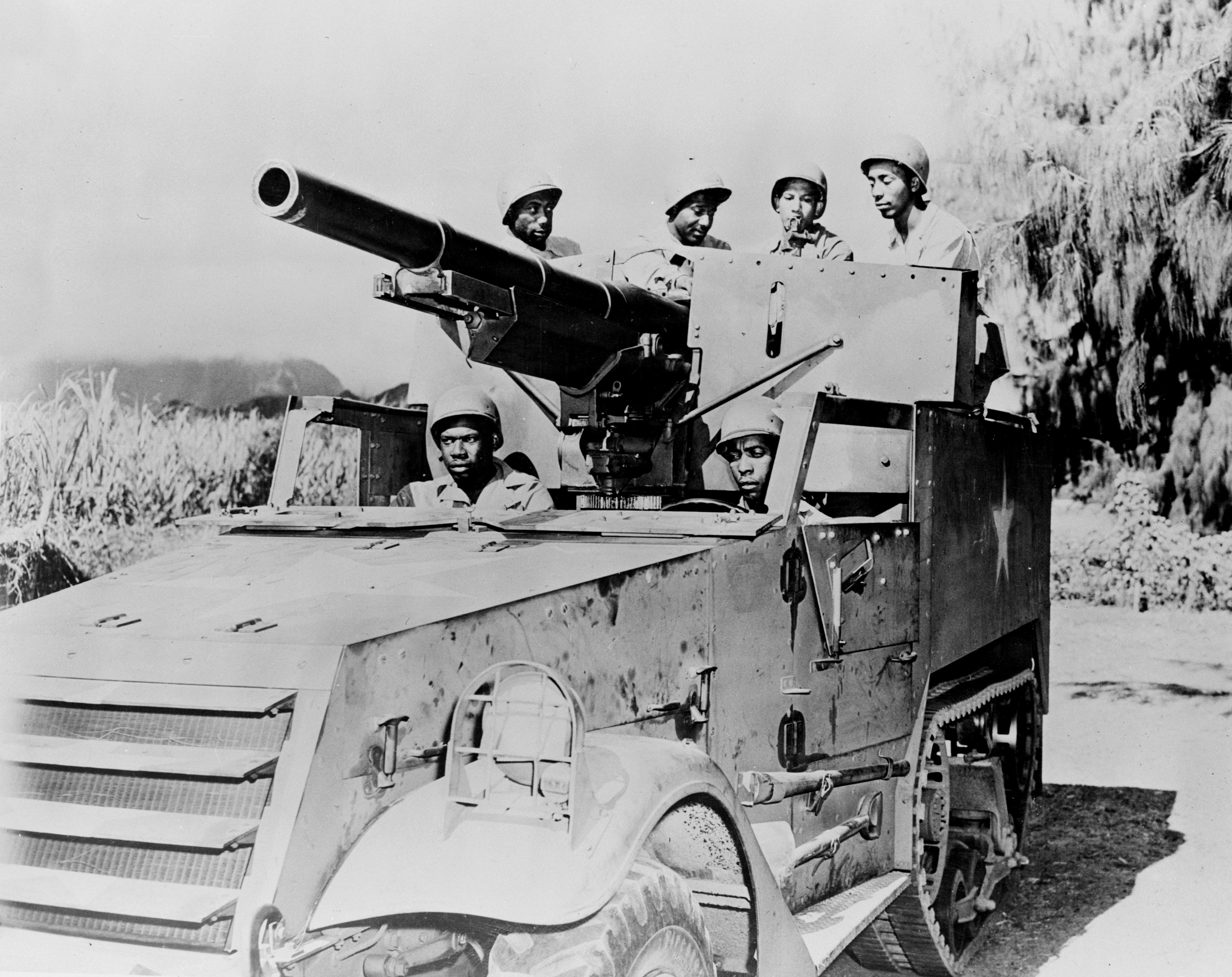
- Upper left: Italian B1 Centauro turreted wheeled tank destroyer, armed with a 105 mm tank gun
- Upper right: US M901 GLH-H (Ground Launched Hellfire-Heavy) anti-tank guided missile tank destroyer
- Lower left: Swedish pvkv m/43 casemate tank destroyer, armed with a 75 mm anti-tank gun
- Lower right: US M3 Gun Motor Carriage half-track tank destroyer, armed with a 75 mm field gun

A tank destroyer, tank hunter or tank killer is a type of armoured fighting vehicle, predominantly intended for anti-tank duties. They are typically armed with a direct fire artillery gun, also known as a self-propelled anti-tank gun, or missile launcher, also called an anti-tank missile carrier. The vehicles are designed specifically to engage and destroy enemy tanks, often with limited operational capacities beyond its intended role.

While tanks are designed for front-line combat, combining operational mobility and tactical offensive and defensive capabilities and performing all primary tasks of the armoured troops, the tank destroyer is specifically designed to take on enemy tanks and other armoured fighting vehicles. Many are based on a tracked tank chassis, while others are wheeled.

Since World War II, gun-armed powerful tank destroyers have fallen out of favor as armies have favored multirole main battle tanks. However, lightly armoured anti-tank guided missile (ATGM) carriers are commonly used for supplementary long-range anti-tank work. The resurgence of expeditionary warfare in the first two decades of the 21st century saw the emergence of gun-armed wheeled vehicles, sometimes called "protected gun systems", which may bear a superficial resemblance to tank destroyers, but are employed as direct fire support units typically providing support in low-intensity operations, as was done in wars in Iraq and Afghanistan.

== World War II ==
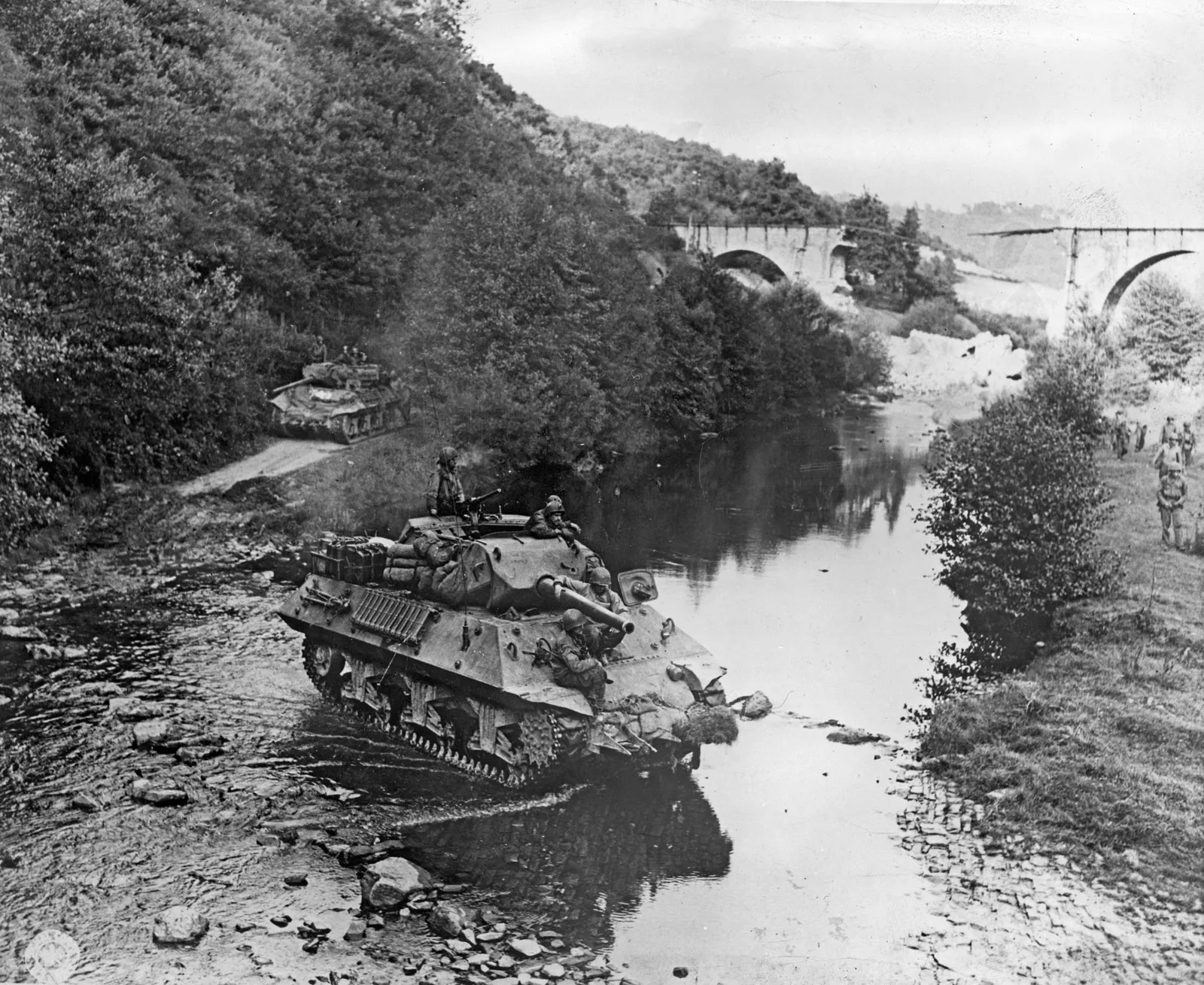
Two American M10 tank destroyers in Belgium during World War II

Dedicated anti-tank vehicles made their first major appearance in the Second World War as combatants developed effective armoured vehicles and tactics. Some were little more than stopgap solutions, mounting an anti-tank gun on a tracked vehicle to give mobility, while others were more sophisticated designs. An example of the development of tank destroyer technology throughout the war is the Marder III and Jagdpanzer 38 vehicles, which were very different in spite of being based on the same chassis: Marder was straightforwardly an anti-tank gun on tracks, whereas the Jagdpanzer 38 traded some firepower for better armour protection and ease of concealment on the battlefield.

Except for most American designs, all tank destroyers were turretless vehicles with fixed or casemate superstructures. When a tank destroyer was used against enemy tanks from a defensive position such as by ambush, the lack of a rotating turret was not particularly critical, while the lower silhouette was highly desirable. The turretless design allowed accommodation of a more powerful gun, typically a dedicated anti-tank gun (in lieu of a regular tank's general-purpose main gun that fired both anti-tank and high explosive ammunition) that had a longer barrel than could be mounted in a turreted tank on the same chassis. The lack of a turret increased the vehicle's internal volume, allowing for increased ammunition stowage and crew comfort. Eliminating the turret let the vehicle carry thicker armour, and also let this armour be concentrated in the hull. Sometimes there was no armoured roof (only a weather cover) to keep the overall weight down to the limit that the chassis could bear. The absence of a turret meant that tank destroyers could be manufactured significantly cheaper, faster, and more easily than the tanks on which they were based, and they found particular favor when production resources were lacking.

=== Germany ===
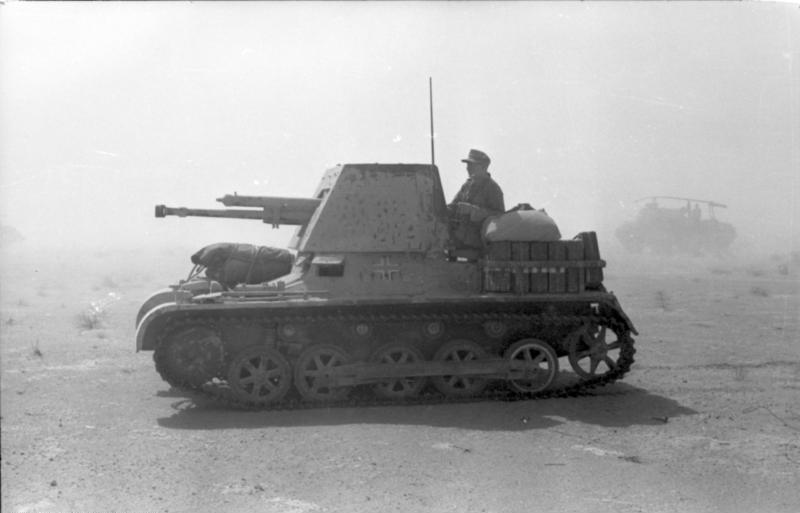
Panzerjäger I

The first German tank destroyers were the Panzerjäger ("Tank Hunters"), which mounted an existing anti-tank gun on a convenient chassis for mobility, usually with just a three-sided gun shield for crew protection. For instance, 202 obsolete Panzer I light tanks were modified by removing the turret and were rebuilt as the Panzerjäger I self-propelled 4.7 cm PaK(t). Similarly, Panzer II tanks were used on the Eastern Front. Captured Soviet 76.2 mm anti-tank guns were mounted on modified Panzer II chassis, producing the Marder II self-propelled anti-tank gun. The most common mounting was a German 75 mm anti-tank gun on the Czech Panzer 38(t) chassis; this combination was deemed the Marder III. The Panzer 38(t) chassis was also used to make the Jagdpanzer 38 casemate style tank destroyer. The Panzerjäger series continued up to the 88 mm equipped Nashorn.

German tank destroyers based on the Panzer III medium tank and later German tanks had more armour than their tank counterparts. One of the more successful German tank destroyers was designed as a self-propelled artillery gun, the Sturmgeschütz III. Based on the Panzer III tank chassis, the Sturmgeschütz III was originally fitted with a short barreled low-velocity howitzer-like gun, and was assigned to the artillery arm for infantry fire support as an assault gun. Later, after encountering Soviet tanks, it was refitted with a comparatively short-barreled high-velocity anti-tank gun, usually with a muzzle brake, enabling it to function as a tank destroyer. The Sturmgeschütz III from its 1938 origin used a new casemate-style superstructure with an integrated design, similar to the later Jagdpanzer vehicle designs' superstructure, to completely enclose the crew. It was employed in infantry support and offensive armoured operations as well as in the defensive anti-tank role. The StuG III assault gun was Germany's most-produced fully tracked armoured fighting vehicle during World War II, and second-most produced German armoured combat vehicle of any type after the Sd.Kfz. 251 half-track.

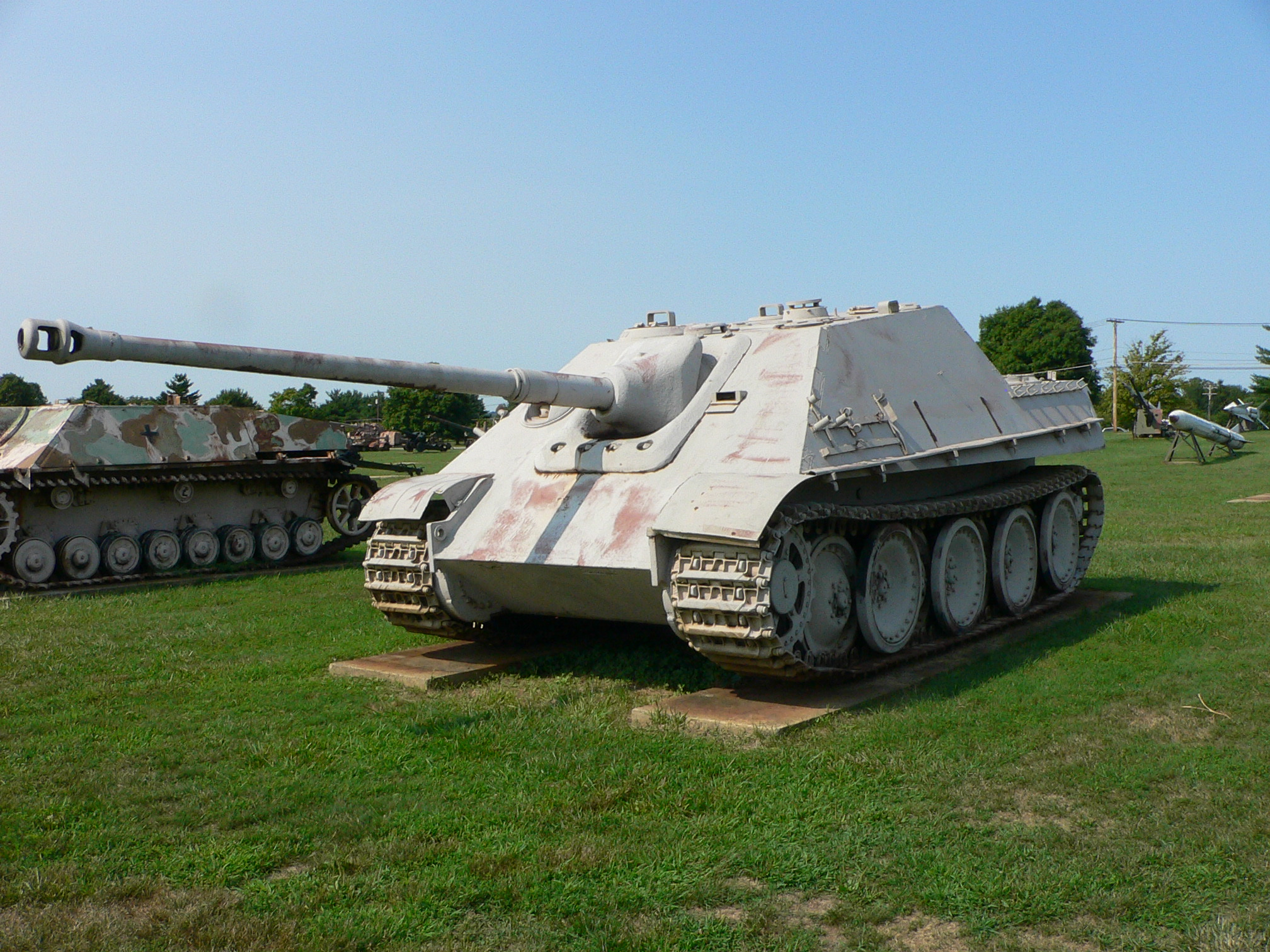
Jagdpanther

Although early German Panzerjägers carried more effective weapons than the tanks on which they were based, they were generally lacking in protection for the crew, having thinly armoured open-topped superstructures. The "open-topped" design format of the Panzerjäger vehicles was succeeded by the Jagdpanzer ("hunting tanks"), which mounted the gun in true casemate-style superstructures, completely enclosing the crew compartment in armour usually integral to the hull. The first of these Jagdpanzers was the 70-ton Ferdinand (later renamed Elefant), based on the chassis, hulls, and drive systems of ninety-one Porsche VK4501 (P) heavy tanks, (Note: The hulls had been built by Porsche in expectation of selection as a heavy tank but had been rejected in favour of what became the Tiger I.) and a long-barreled 88 mm cannon mounted in an added casemate. Like the Panzerjägers before it, the Ferdinand received additional armour for the gun crew, but also completely enclosed gun and crew within the added casemate, as later purpose-built Jagdpanzers would. However, the Ferdinand was mechanically unreliable and difficult to maneuver, and once all ninety-one unturreted "Porsche Tiger" hulls/drive systems were converted, no more were built. The German Army had more success with the Jagdpanther. Introduced in mid-1944, the Jagdpanther, of which some 415 examples were produced, was considered the best of the casemate-design Jagdpanzer designs. It featured the same powerful PaK 43 88 mm cannon used on the unwieldy Elefant, now fitted to the chassis of the medium Panther tank, providing greatly improved armour-penetrating capability in a medium-weight vehicle.

Facing an increasingly defensive war, the German Army turned to larger and more powerfully armed Jagdpanzer designs, and in July 1944 the first Jagdtiger rolled off the production line; it was the heaviest German armoured fighting vehicle to go into active service. The Jagdtiger was based on the Tiger II heavy tank and featured a very large 128 mm PaK 44 cannon and heavy armour protection. Only 88 Jagdtiger vehicles were produced, barely matching the total number of the earlier Ferdinand/Elefant vehicles. They were first deployed to combat units in September 1944.

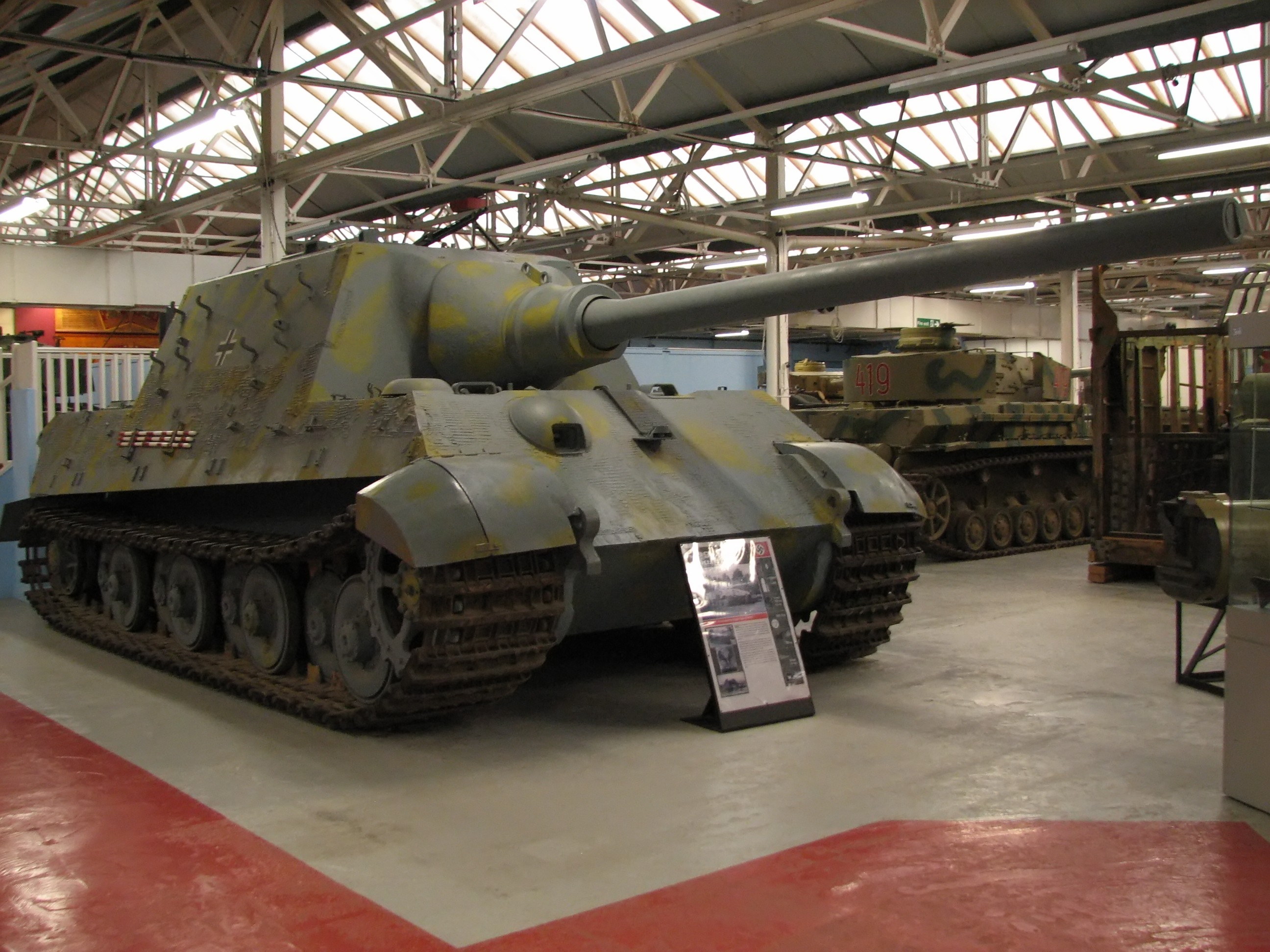
Jagdtiger

The decision to use a casemate-style superstructure for all tank destroyers had the advantage of a reduced silhouette, allowing the crew to more frequently fire from defilade ambush positions. Such designs were also easier and faster to manufacture and offered good crew protection from artillery fire and shell splinters. However, the lack of a rotating turret limited the gun's traverse to a few degrees. This meant that the driver normally had to turn the entire tank onto its target, a much slower process than simply rotating a powered turret. If the vehicle became immobilized due to engine failure or track damage, it could not rotate its gun to counter opposing tanks, making it highly vulnerable to counterfire. This vulnerability was exploited by opposing tank forces. Even the largest and most powerful of German tank destroyers were found abandoned on the field after a battle, having been immobilized by one or more hits by high explosive (HE) or armour-piercing (AP) shells to the track or front drive sprocket.

=== Italy ===
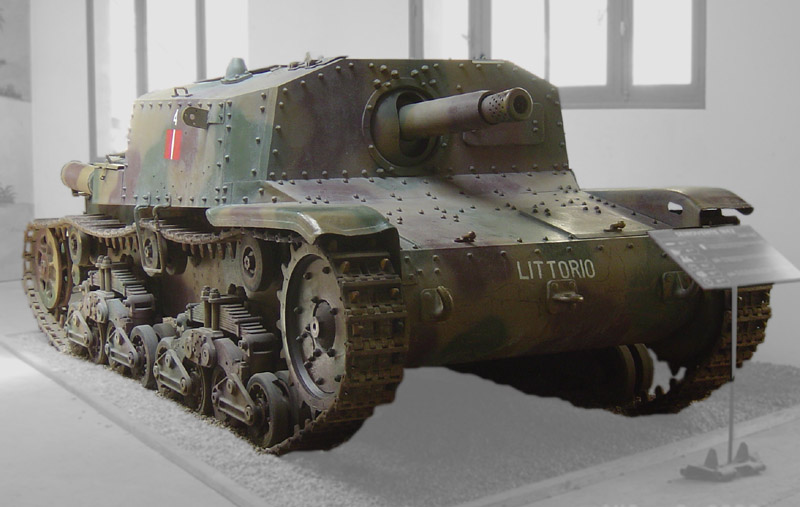
Semovente da 75/18

The most famous Italian tank destroyer of the Second World War was a self-propelled gun. The Semovente da 75/18, based on the M13/40 frame, was developed to support front-line infantry, and therefore had fixed armament: a 75 mm gun in casemate. However, thanks to its low height (185 cm) and the caliber of its gun the 75/18 also had good results in anti-tank combat, fighting against British and American (but not Soviet) units. After the Armistice of 1943, the 75/18 remained in use by German forces.

Built on the same frame, the Semovente da 105/25 was equipped with a 105 mm gun and known as "bassotto" (Italian for dachshund) due to its lower height. As manufacturing began in 1943, the 105/25 was used by German forces. A further development was the Semovente da 75/46, which had a longer gun than the 75/18 and inclined armour 100 mm thick, making it similar to Sturmgeschütz III. Only 11 of these were manufactured. Before the Semovente da 75/18, the L40, built on an L6/40 light tank chassis, saw action in Africa and in Russia, but with disappointing results.

=== Japan ===
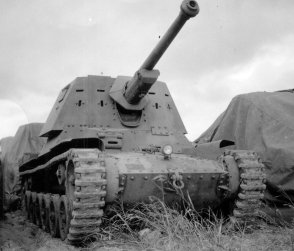
Type 3 Ho-Ni III

The Type 1 Ho-Ni I was the first self-propelled gun design of the Imperial Japanese Army. They were meant to be self-propelled artillery and tank destroyers for armoured divisions. The plan was for the Type 1 Ho-Ni I gun tank to form part of a fire support company in each of the tank regiments. The Type 1 Ho-Ni I was developed by using the existing Type 97 Chi-Ha medium tank chassis and engine, and replacing the gun turret with a Type 90 75 mm field gun mounted in an open casemate with frontal and side armour only. They entered service in 1942 and were first deployed in combat at the Battle of Luzon in the Philippines in 1945. Some were used in static entrenched positions.

A variant, known as the Type 1 Ho-Ni II mounted a Type 91 105 mm howitzer and had a slightly changed superstructure as far as the side armor with re-positioned observation visors. Production began in 1943, with only 54 completed.

The other variant produced was the Type 3 Ho-Ni III, which mounted a Type 3 75 mm tank gun in a completely enclosed armored casemate to address the issue of crew protection in close combat. The welded superstructure had sloped armour and the gun mount had additional stamped armour plate. The total number produced of all three types in the Ho-Ni series were 111 units. Most of the Ho-Ni units were retained within the Japanese home islands to form part of the defenses against the projected American invasion, and did not see combat before the surrender of Japan.

The Type 2 Ho-I Gun tank used the Type 1 Chi-He medium tank chassis. It was designed as a self-propelled howitzer, mounting a short barreled Type 99 75 mm gun to provide close-in fire support. For deployment, the gun tank was intended to be used in a fire support company for each of the tank regiments. No Type 2 Ho-I gun tanks are known to have engaged in combat prior to Japan's surrender. The prototype was built in 1942 and 31 units were produced in 1944.

The Type 4 Ho-Ro self-propelled artillery used a modified Type 97 chassis. On to this platform, a Type 38 150 mm howitzer was mounted. The main gun could fire Type 88 APHE rounds and HEAT rounds. Given its breech loader, the maximum rate of fire was only 5 rounds per minute. The gun's elevation was restricted to 30 degrees by the construction of the chassis. Other design issues included the fact that although the gun crew was protected by a gun shield with armour thickness of 25 mm at the front, the shield only extended a very short distance on the sides; leaving the rest of the sides and back exposed. They were rushed into service, deployed and saw combat during the Philippines Campaign in the last year of World War II. Remaining units were deployed to Okinawa in ones and twos for island defense during the Battle of Okinawa, but were severely outnumbered by American artillery.

=== Soviet Union ===
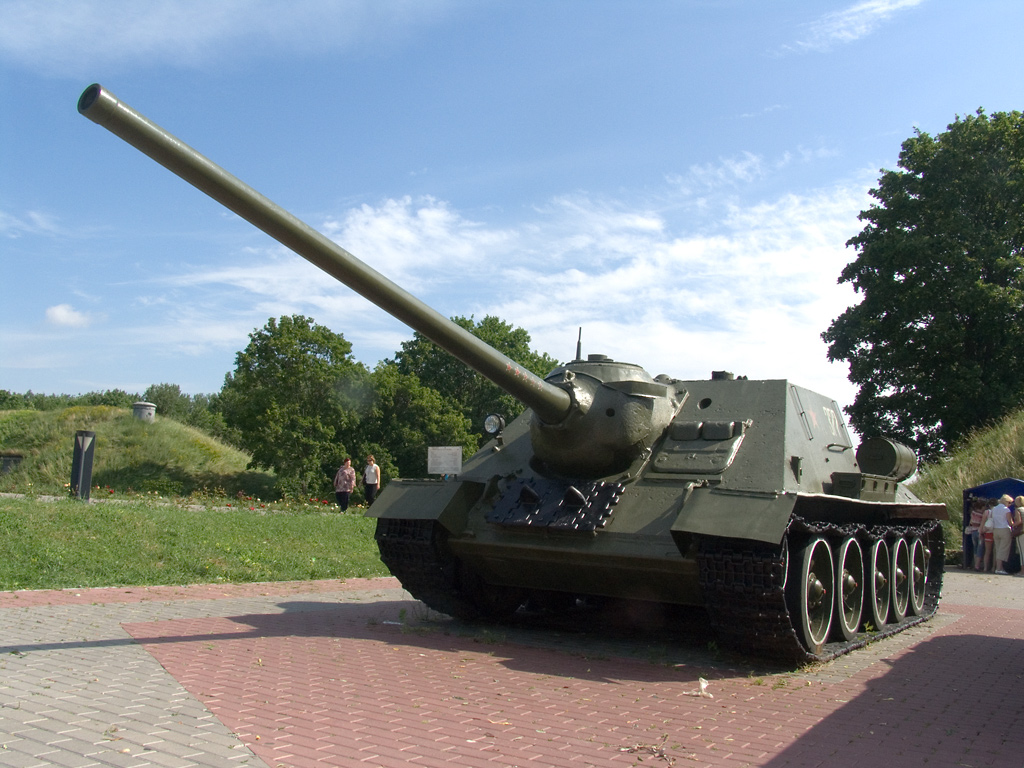
Soviet SU-100

As with the Germans of 1943, most of the Soviet designs mounted anti-tank guns, with limited traverse in casemate-style turretless hulls, in a general design format looking much like the Germans' own Jagdpanzer vehicles. The results were smaller, lighter, and simpler to build weapons that could carry larger guns than any contemporary tank, including the King Tiger. The Soviets produced high numbers of the 85 mm SU-85 and 100 mm SU-100 self-propelled guns based on the same chassis as the T-34 medium tank; the heavier-duty powertrain and hull of the IS-2 heavy tank were instead used to produce the heavier-hitting 122 mm-armed ISU-122 and 152 mm-armed ISU-152, both of which had impressive anti-tank capabilities earning each of them the Russian nickname Zveroboy ("beast killer") for their ability to destroy German Tigers, Panthers and Elefants. The predecessor of the ISU 152 was the SU-152, built on the KV-1s chassis and shared many similarities (including its gun) with the ISU-152. The ISU-152 built as a heavy assault gun, relied on the weight of the shell fired from its M-1937/43 howitzer to defeat tanks. In 1943, the Soviets also shifted all production of light tanks like the T-70 to much simpler and better-armed SU-76 self-propelled guns, which used the same drive train. The SU-76 was originally designed as an anti-tank vehicle, but was soon relegated to the infantry-support role.

=== United States ===
U.S. Army and counterpart British designs were very different in conception. U.S. doctrine was based, in light of the fall of France, on the perceived need to defeat German blitzkrieg tactics, and U.S. units expected to face large numbers of German tanks, attacking on relatively narrow fronts. These were expected to break through a thin screen of anti-tank guns, hence the decision that the main anti-tank units—the Tank Destroyer (TD) battalions—should be concentrated and very mobile. In practice, such German attacks rarely happened. Throughout the war, only one battalion ever fought in an engagement like that originally envisaged (the 601st, at the Battle of El Guettar). The Tank Destroyer Command eventually numbered over 100,000 men and 80 battalions each equipped with 36 self-propelled tank destroyers or towed guns.

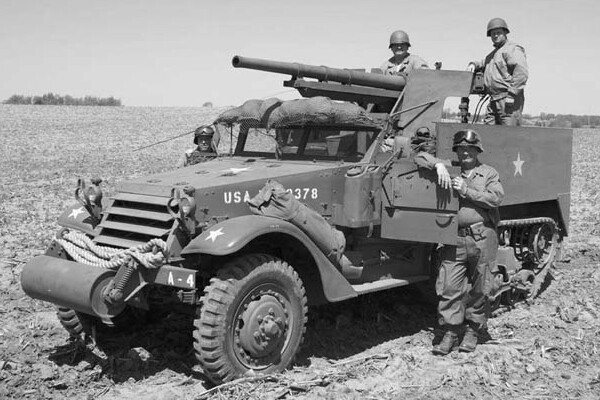
The first US tank destroyer was a 75 mm gun on a half-track chassis

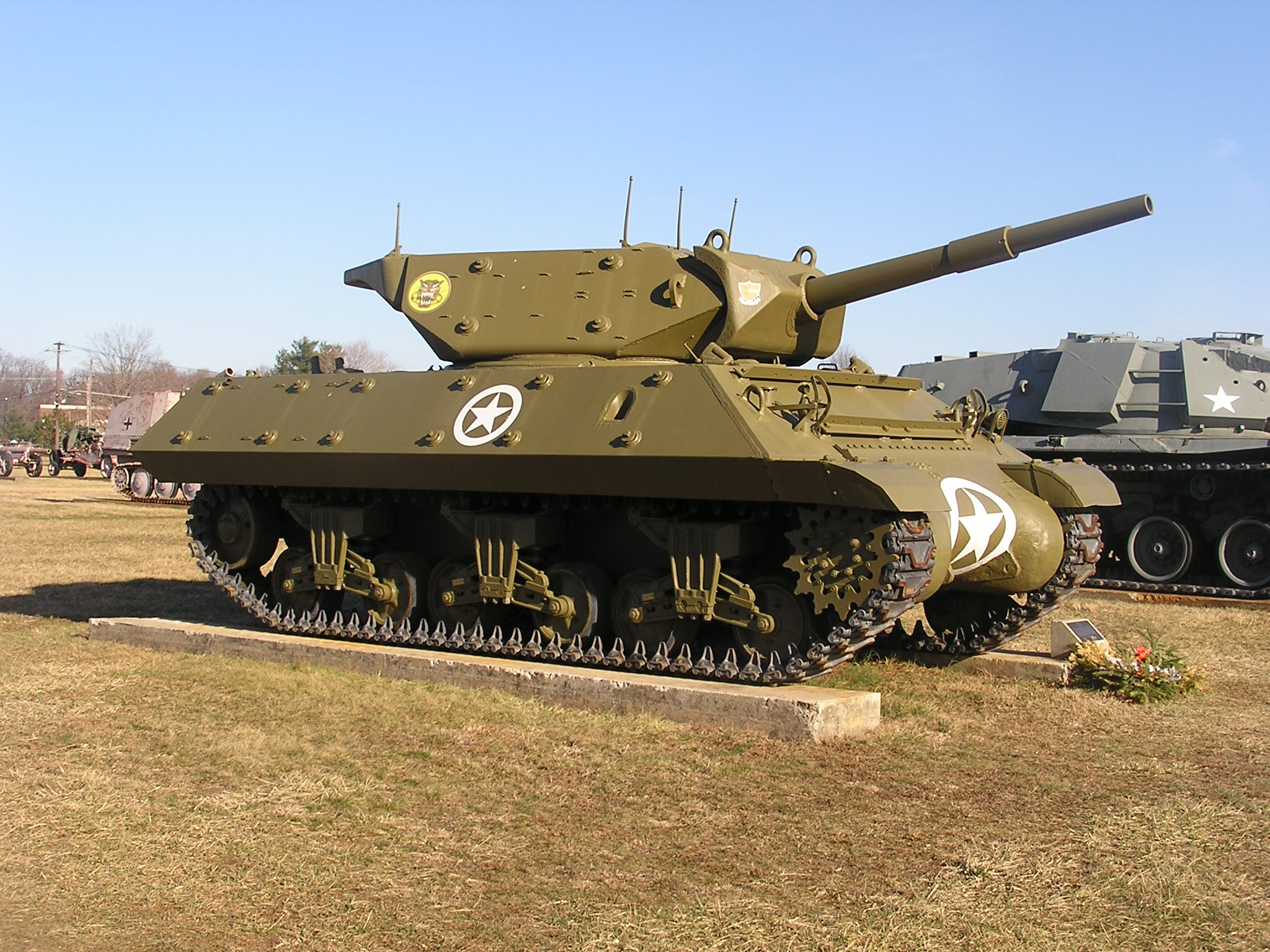
M10 tank destroyer

Only a few shots were expected to be fired from any firing position. Strong reconnaissance elements were provided so that TDs could use pre-arranged firing positions to best advantage. Flanking fire by TDs was emphasized, both to penetrate thinner enemy side armour, and to reduce the likelihood of accurate enemy return fire.

All American tank destroyers were officially known by exactly the same collective term used for American self-propelled artillery ordnance, "gun motor carriage". The designs were intended to be very mobile and heavily armed. Most tank-hull based designs used special open-topped turrets which differed from the design used for the original tank model. These custom turrets were intended to reduce weight and accommodate larger guns. The earliest expedient design involved mounting a 75 mm M1897 field gun in a limited-traverse mount onto an M3 half-track; the result was designated the 75 mm gun motor carriage M3. Another, considerably less successful, early design was the M6 gun motor carriage, which mounted the US 37 mm anti-tank gun facing to the rear on the bed of a Dodge 3/4-ton light truck.

The M3 was first used against the Japanese in the Philippines and then in the Tunisian campaign of the war in North Africa. Some were supplied to British units who used them within armoured car reconnaissance regiments for fire support. The M6 GMC was unarmoured and the 37 mm gun was ineffective against most enemy tanks by the time it entered service.

By far the most common US design, and the first that was fully tracked and turreted (which became the American hallmark of World War II tank destroyer design) was the 3-inch gun motor carriage M10, later supplemented by the 90 mm gun motor carriage M36—both based on the M4 Sherman hull and powertrain—and the 76 mm gun motor carriage M18 (Hellcat), based on a unique hull and powertrain design, with a slight visual resemblance to what was used for the later M24 Chaffee light tank. The M18 came closest to the US ideal; the vehicle was very fast, small, and mounted a 76 mm gun in a roofless open turret. The M36 Jackson GMC possessed the only American-origin operational gun that could rival the German 8.8 cm Pak 43 anti-tank gun and its tank mounted variant, the 90 mm M3 gun, and the M36 remained in service well after World War II. The only dedicated American casemate hull design fighting vehicle of any type built during the war, that resembled the German and Soviet tank destroyers in hull and general gun mounting design, was the experimental T28 super-heavy tank, which mounted a 105 mm T5E1 long-barrel cannon. This gun had a maximum firing range of 12 miles (20 km), and the vehicle was originally designed as a very heavily armoured self-propelled assault gun to breach Germany's Siegfried Line defenses.

Of these tank destroyers, only the 90 mm gun of the M36 proved effective against the frontal armour of Germany's larger armoured vehicles at long range. Their open tops and light armour made these tank destroyers vulnerable to anything greater than small-arms fire. As the number of German tanks encountered by American forces steadily decreased throughout the war, most battalions were split up and assigned to infantry units as supporting arms, fighting as assault guns or used essentially as tanks. In this sense they were an alternative to the independent tank battalions that were attached to various infantry divisions.

The expectation that German tanks would be engaged in mass formation would prove incorrect. In reality, German attacks effectively used combined arms on the ground, fighting cohesively. American tank destroyer battalions comprised three tank destroyer companies supported by nine security sections. The single-purpose tactics of the tank destroyer battalion failed to account for non-tank threats.

In the 1950s the goal of providing airborne forces with a parachute-capable self-propelled anti-tank weapon led to the deployment of the M56 Scorpion and M50 Ontos. The concept later led to the M551 Sheridan light tank of the mid-1960s.

=== United Kingdom ===
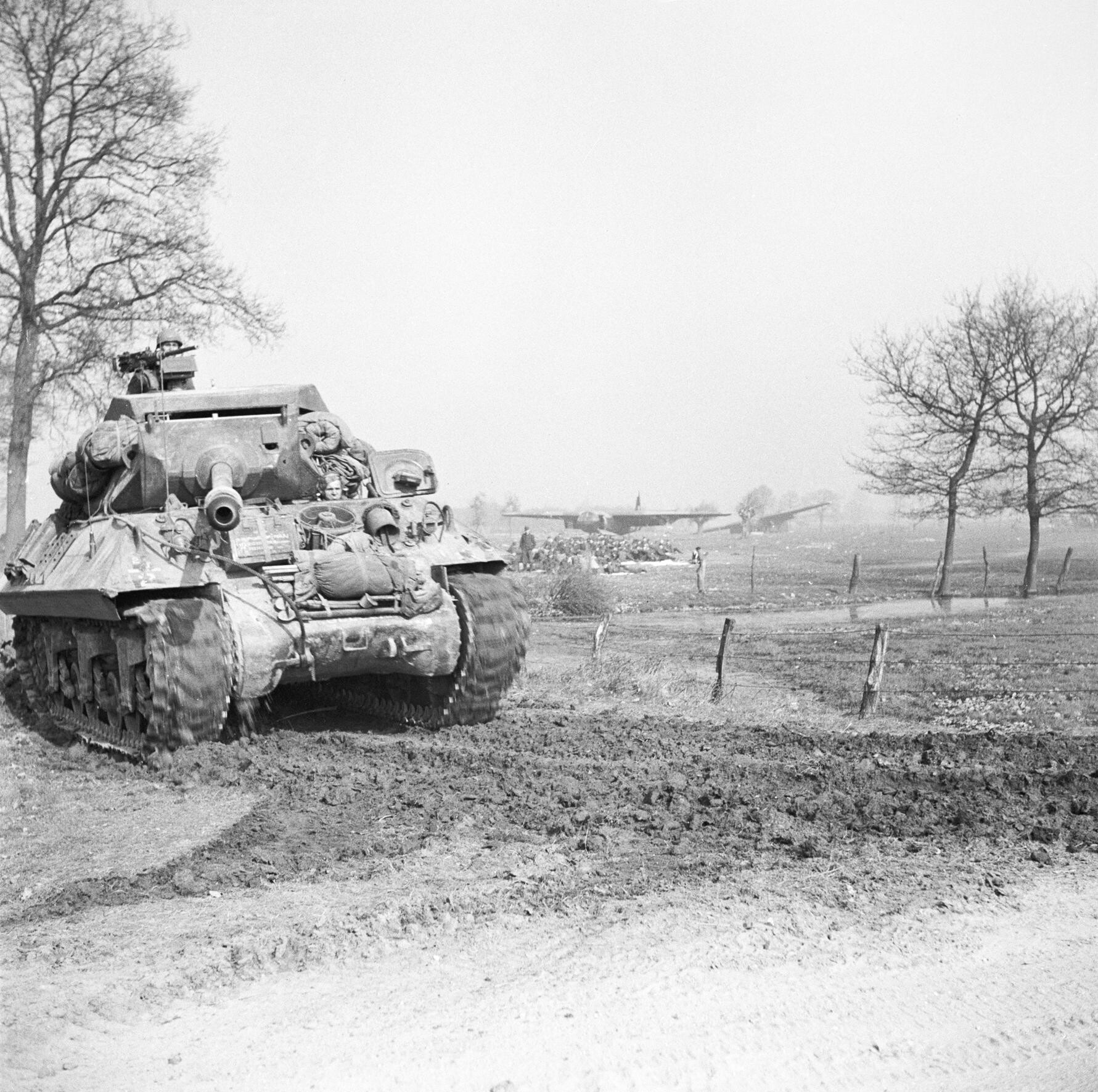
A British Achilles self-propelled anti-tank gun on the east bank of the Rhine following Operation Plunder

Except for the pre-war Matilda I design, British tanks in the early years of the war, including both infantry tanks and cruiser tanks, were armed with the 40 mm Ordnance QF 2 pounder and therefore capable against enemy tanks. They would be upgraded to the 57 mm Ordnance QF 6 pounder when that became available. There was extra impetus given to the development of anti-tank weaponry, culminating in the 76mm Ordnance QF 17 pounder, among the best anti-tank guns of the war.

Towed anti-tank guns were the domain of the Royal Artillery and vehicles adapted to mount artillery, including anti-tank self-propelled guns such as the Deacon (6pdr on an armoured wheeled truck chassis) and Archer (17pdr on tracked chassis) and US-supplied vehicles, were their preserve rather than the Royal Armoured Corps.

The self-propelled guns built in the "tank destroyer" mould came about through the desire to field the QF 17 pounder anti-tank gun and simultaneous lack of suitable standard tanks to carry it. As a result, they were of a somewhat extemporized nature. Mounting the gun on the Valentine tank chassis in a fixed superstructure gave the Archer, resembling the light-chassis German Marder III. The 17 pounder was also used to re-equip the US-supplied M10 tank destroyer, replacing the American 3-inch gun to produce the 17pdr SP Achilles.

In 1942 the General Staff agreed on investigating self-propelled mountings of the 6-pounder, 17-pounder, 3-inch 20cwt guns and the 25-pounder field gun/howitzer on the Matilda II, Valentine, Crusader and Cavalier (Cruiser Mark VII) tank chassis. In October 1942 it was decided to progress using the Valentine chassis with a 17-pdr (which would become Archer) and 25-pdr (which entered service as Bishop).

While there was a general move to a general-purpose gun usable against both tanks and in supporting infantry, there was a need to put the 17 pdr into a tank for use against the enemy's heavy tanks. The Cruiser Mk VIII Challenger was a project to bring a 17 pdr tank into use to support the Cromwell cruiser tank. Delays led to it being outnumbered in use by the Sherman Firefly—but a derivative of Challenger was the more or less open-topped variant Avenger, which was delayed until post war before entering service. A cut-down 17 pdr, the 77mmHV was used to equip the Comet tank in the final year of the war.

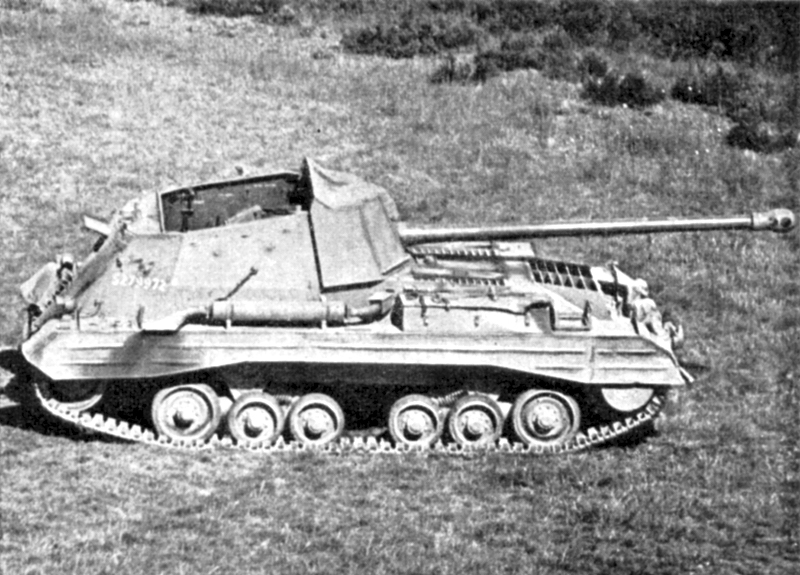
Self-propelled 17pdr, Valentine, Mk I, Archer. The gun faced to the rear.

The closest the British came to developing an armoured tank destroyer in the vein of the German Jagdpanzers or Soviet ISU series was the Churchill 3-inch gun carrier. A Churchill tank chassis with a boxy superstructure in place of the turret, it was equipped with a 3-inch anti-aircraft gun. Although a number were ordered and fifty delivered in 1942, they were not put into service as the immediate threat passed. The design was rejected in favor of developing a 17 pdr-armed Cromwell variant, ultimately leading to the Comet tank. The Tortoise "heavy assault tank", intended for breaking through fixed defensive lines, was well-armoured and had a very powerful 32-pounder (94 mm) gun, but did not reach service use.

By 1944, a number of the Shermans in British use were being converted to Sherman Fireflies by adding the QF 17 pounder gun. Initially this gave each troop (platoon) of Shermans one powerfully armed tank. By war's end—through the production of more Fireflies and the replacement of Shermans by British tanks—about 50% of Shermans in British service were Fireflies. The Sherman Firefly, however, is not considered a tank destroyer since it could still perform the other duties of the regular M4 Sherman, albeit the Firefly was less capable due to the late development of a HE round for the QF 17 pounder.

=== Romania ===
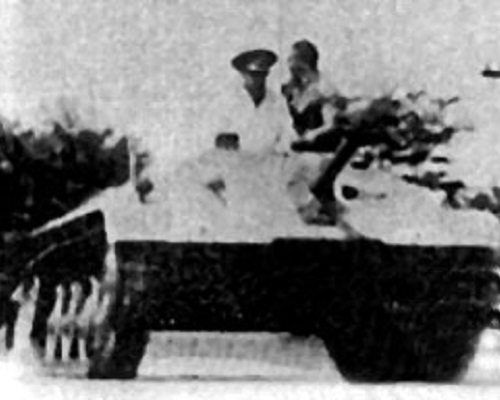
The Romanian Mareșal tank destroyer, developed starting in late 1942, is proposed to have inspired the German Hetzer's design.

Until 1942, the Romanian tank force was equipped exclusively with obsolete R-1, R-2 and R35 tanks. Having struggled against Soviet T-34 and KV-1 tanks on the Eastern Front, Romanian Army leadership sought to improve its anti-tank capabilities. The initial plan was the creation of a tank comparable to the T-34; instead, Romania went for a number of tank destroyers, since they were more suitable for its industry.

The Mareșal is probably the best known Romanian AFV from the war; historians Steven Zaloga and Mark Axworthy state that it inspired the design of the German Hetzer. A mere 1.5 m in height, the Mareșal was lightly armored and highly mobile, making it difficult to hit. It was armed with the Romanian 75 mm Reșița M1943 anti-tank gun, which proved to be among the best of its class during World War II, according to Mark Axworthy. During tests, the Mareșal proved superior in many aspects to the StuG III G, against which it competed. Those facts suggest that the Mareșal would have been an effective tank destroyer. There were, however, also critics of the vehicle, especially among high-ranking Romanian officials. It never saw combat, as the invasion by the Soviet army halted its production.

Other Romanian tank destroyers include the TACAM R-2 and TACAM T-60, which were converted from R-2 and T-60 light tanks respectively. Both of them saw action. One TACAM R-2 survives today and is displayed at the National Military Museum in Bucharest. Another conversion was the VDC R-35, Romania's only turreted tank destroyer. Two other proposed tank destroyers existed: the TACAM R-1 and TACAM T-38.

=== Poland ===
Variants of the Polish TKS and TK-3 tankettes up-armed with 20 mm gun (23–26 vehicles) were operationally deployed in the invasion of Poland. They were used as an anti-tank component of the reconnaissance units. There were also 37 mm armed TKS-D (2 experimental vehicles) and 47 mm armed TKD (4 experimental vehicles). It is not certain whether they were used operationally at all.

=== France ===
Due to the quick defeat of France, few French vehicles were built. The Laffly W15 TCC (Chasseur de chars) was an attempt to quickly build a light tank destroyer by mounting a 47 mm SA37 anti-tank gun onto a lightly armoured Laffly W15T artillery tractor. Other French tank destroyers were being developed, including the SOMUA SAu-40, ARL V39 and various ad hoc conversions of the Lorraine 37L.

== Subsequent developments ==
=== Missile-based tank destroyers (ATGM-carriers) ===
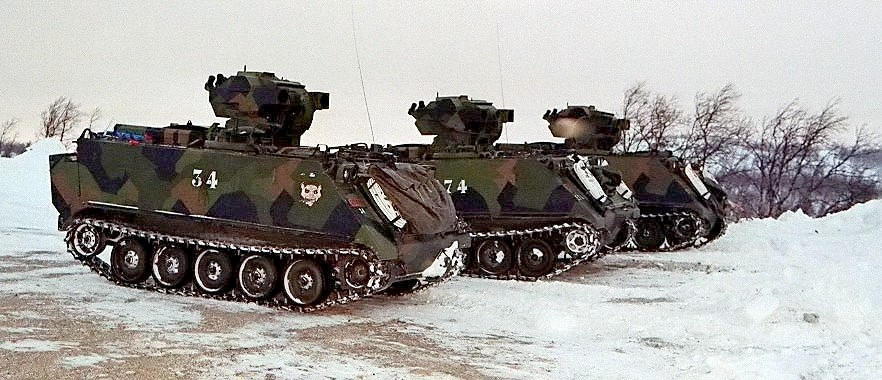
A Norwegian anti-tank platoon equipped with NM142 TOW missile launchers

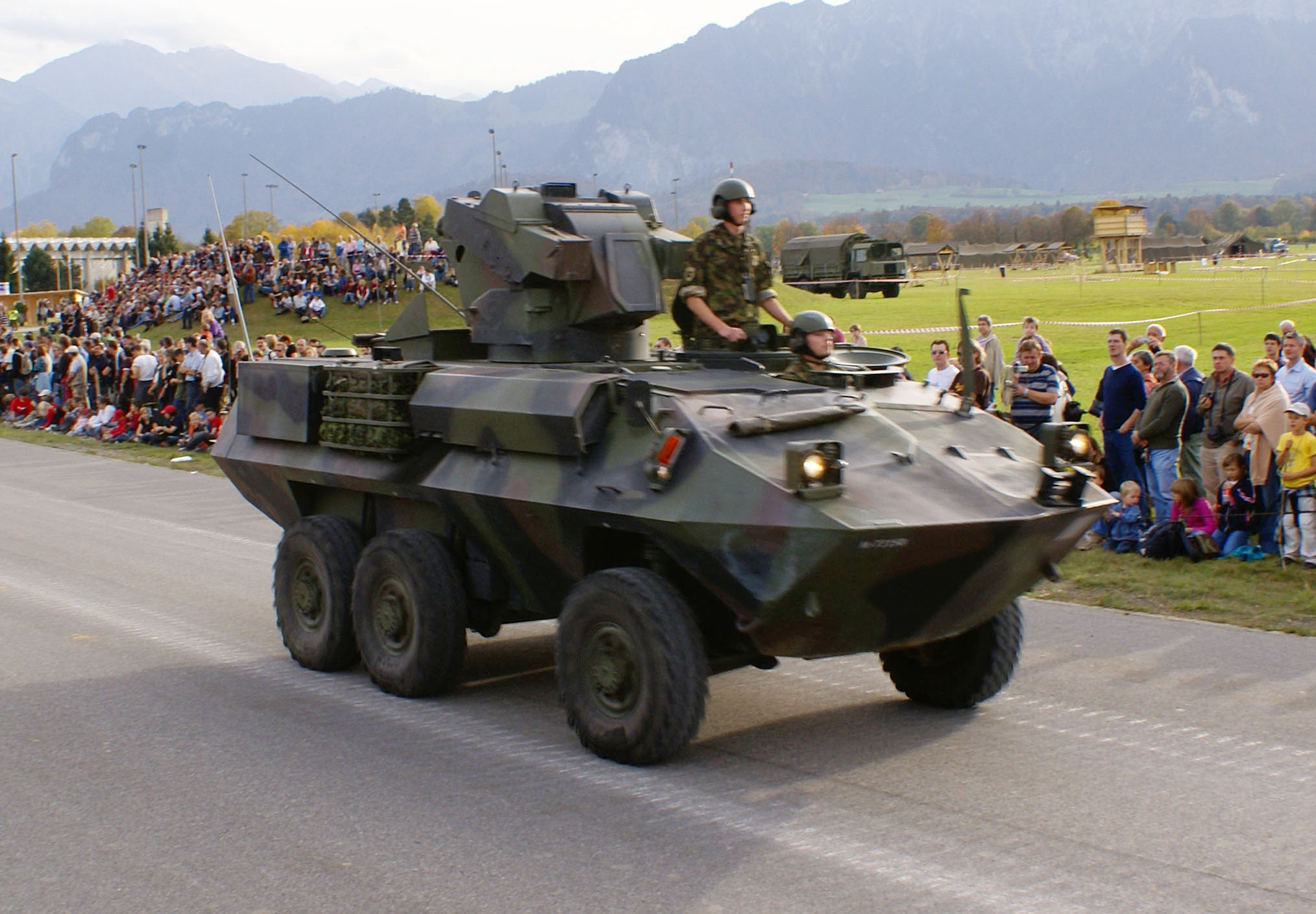
Mowag Piranha–based, TOW-armed ATGM carrier of the Swiss Army

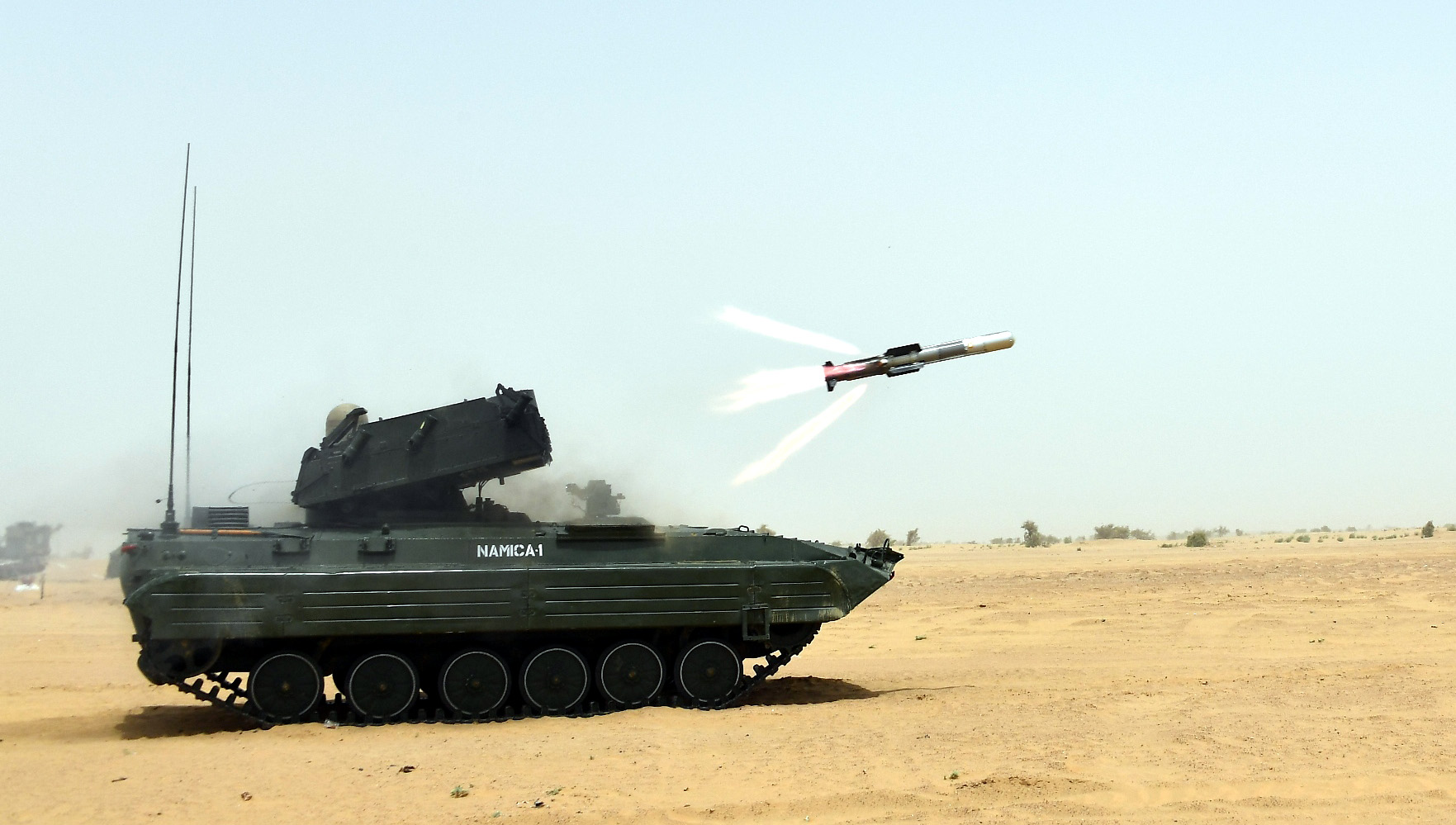
NAMICA, a contemporary Indian tank destroyer based on the BMP-2 chassis and equipped with the NAG anti-tank missiles.

In the face of the Warsaw Pact, a general need for extra firepower was identified. In the late 1960s, West Germany developed the Kanonenjagdpanzer, essentially a modernized World War II Jagdpanzer mounting a 90 mm gun. As Soviet designs became more heavily armoured, the 90 mm gun became ineffective and the Kanonenjagdpanzers were retrofitted for different roles or retired. Some provisions were made for the fitting of a 105 mm cannon, and many vehicles were modified to fire HOT or TOW missiles in place of a main gun. These upgraded variants remained in service into the 1990s.

With the development of flexible anti-tank missiles, which could be installed on almost any vehicle by the 1960s, the concept of the tank destroyer has morphed into light vehicles with missiles. With the weight of main battle tanks growing to the forty to seventy-tonne range, airborne forces were unable to deploy reasonable anti-tank forces. The result was a number of attempts to make a light vehicle, including the conventional ASU-85, M56 Scorpion, the recoilless rifle-armed Ontos, and missile-armed Humber Hornet armoured truck and Sheridan light assault vehicle. More recent examples include the 2S25 Sprut-SD, armed with a current-issue 125 mm tank gun also capable of launching missiles like the 9M119 Svir, and Israeli-modified Pandur IIs, which are to enter service with the Philippine Army by 2022 armed with an Elbit Turret and a 105 mm gun.

Many forces' infantry fighting vehicles (IFVs) carry anti-tank missiles in every infantry platoon, and attack helicopters have also added anti-tank capability to the modern battlefield. But there are still dedicated anti-tank vehicles with very heavy long-range missiles, and ones intended for airborne use.

There have also been dedicated anti-tank vehicles built on ordinary armoured personnel carrier or armored car chassis. Examples include the U.S. M901 ITV (Improved TOW Vehicle) and the Norwegian NM142, both on an M113 chassis, several Soviet ATGM launchers based on the BRDM reconnaissance car, the British FV438 Swingfire and FV102 Striker and the German Raketenjagdpanzer series built on the chassis of the HS 30 and Marder IFV. India fields the NAMIS (Nag Missile System) equipped with Nag missiles on certain modified BMP-2 IFVs called NAMICA.

A US Army combined arms battalion has two infantry companies with TOW missile-armed Bradley IFVs and can bring a large concentration of accurate and lethal fire to bear on an attacking enemy unit that uses AFVs. They can be complemented by mobile units of AH-64 Apache helicopters armed with Hellfire anti-tank missiles.

Missile carrying vehicles are often referred to as anti-tank missile carriers instead of tank destroyers.

=== Postwar gun-based tank destroyers ===
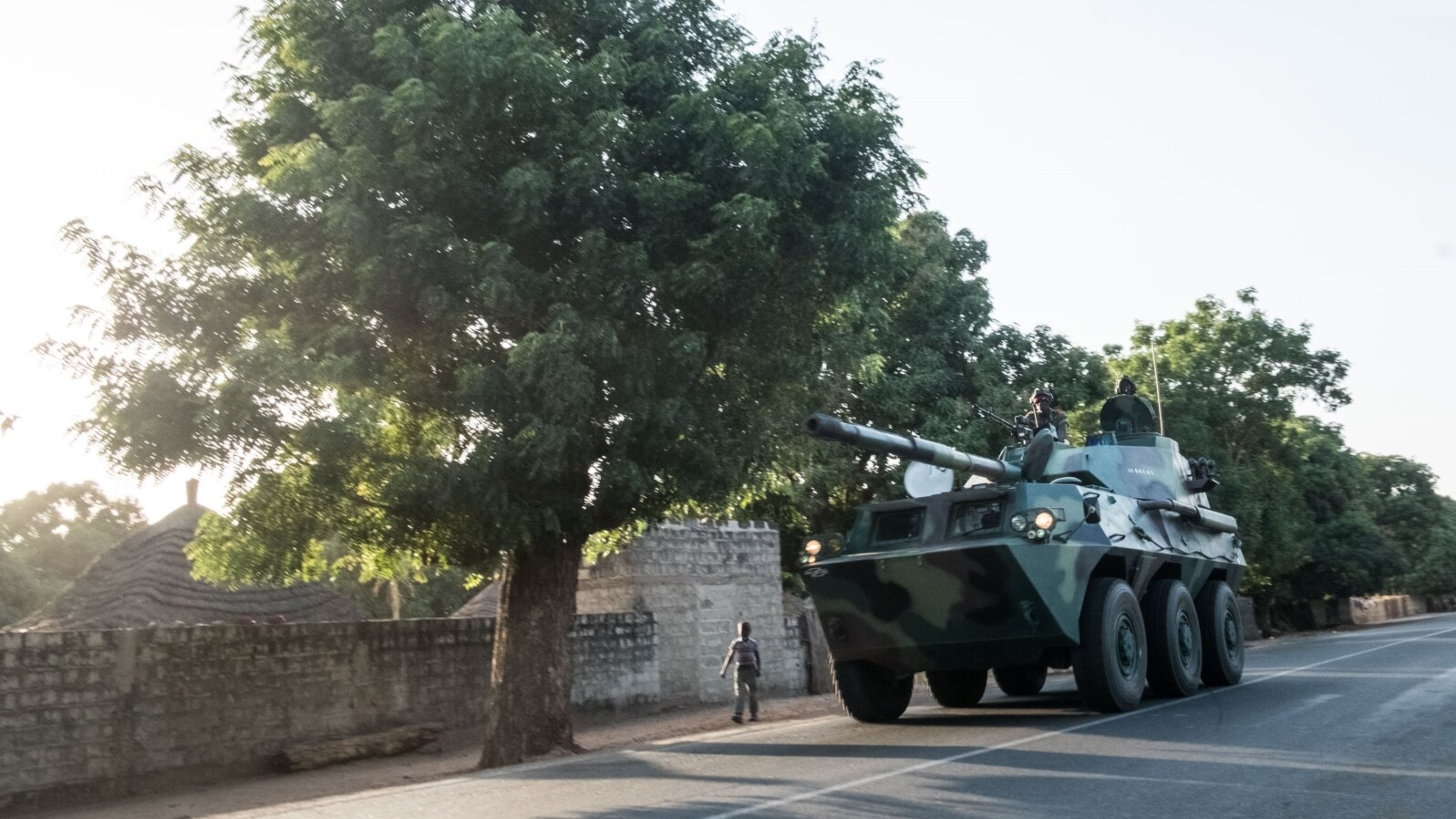
Chinese-built PTL-02 tank destroyer armed with a 100 millimeters (3.9 in) cannon, being used by the Senegalese military near the Gambian border in 2017.

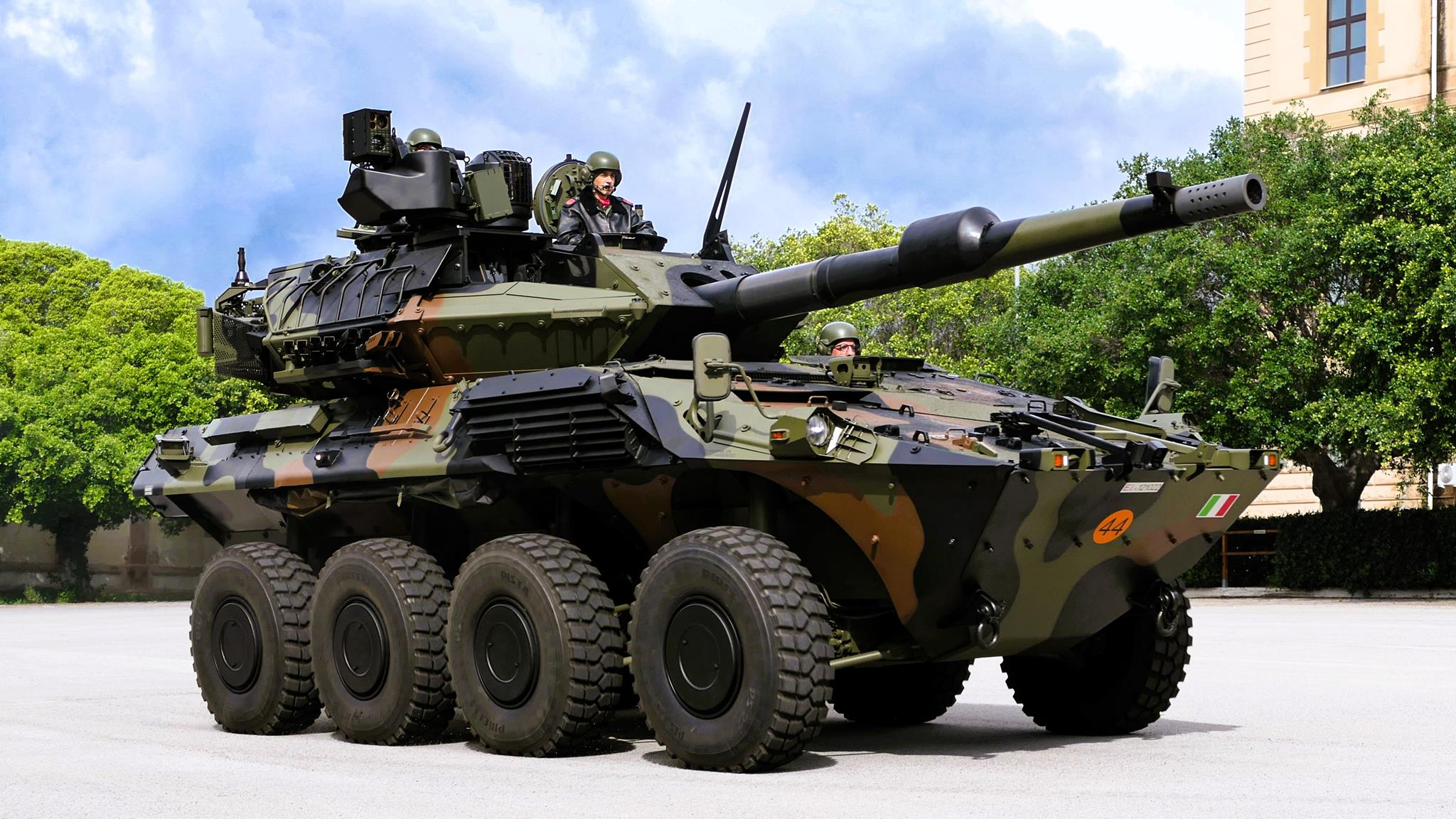
Italian Centauro II wheeled turreted tank destroyer, armed with a 120 mm gun

Despite the proliferation of ATGMs, some gun-armed tank destroyers remain in use. China has developed the tracked PTZ89 and the wheeled PTL02 tank destroyers. The PTZ89 is armed with a 120 mm smoothbore cannon while the PTL02, developed by NORINCO for the PLA's new light (rapid reaction) mechanized infantry divisions, carries a 100 millimeters (3.9 in) one (a version armed with a 105 mm rifled gun is available for export). The PTL02 is built on the 6×6 wheeled chassis of the WZ551 APC.

Italy and Spain use the Italian-built B1 Centauro, a wheeled tank destroyer with a 105 mm cannon.

Russia, meanwhile, uses the Russian-built 2S25 Sprut-SD, operating as an amphibious light tank/tank destroyer armed with a 125 millimeters (4.9 in) cannon.

The Sabrah Pandur II is a wheeled tank destroyer variant of the Sabrah light tank developed by the Elbit Systems of Israel for the Philippine Army's future combat systems.

== See also ==
- Armoured warfare
- Self-propelled anti-aircraft weapon
- Self-propelled artillery
