= 4th Tank Division (Imperial Japanese Army) =

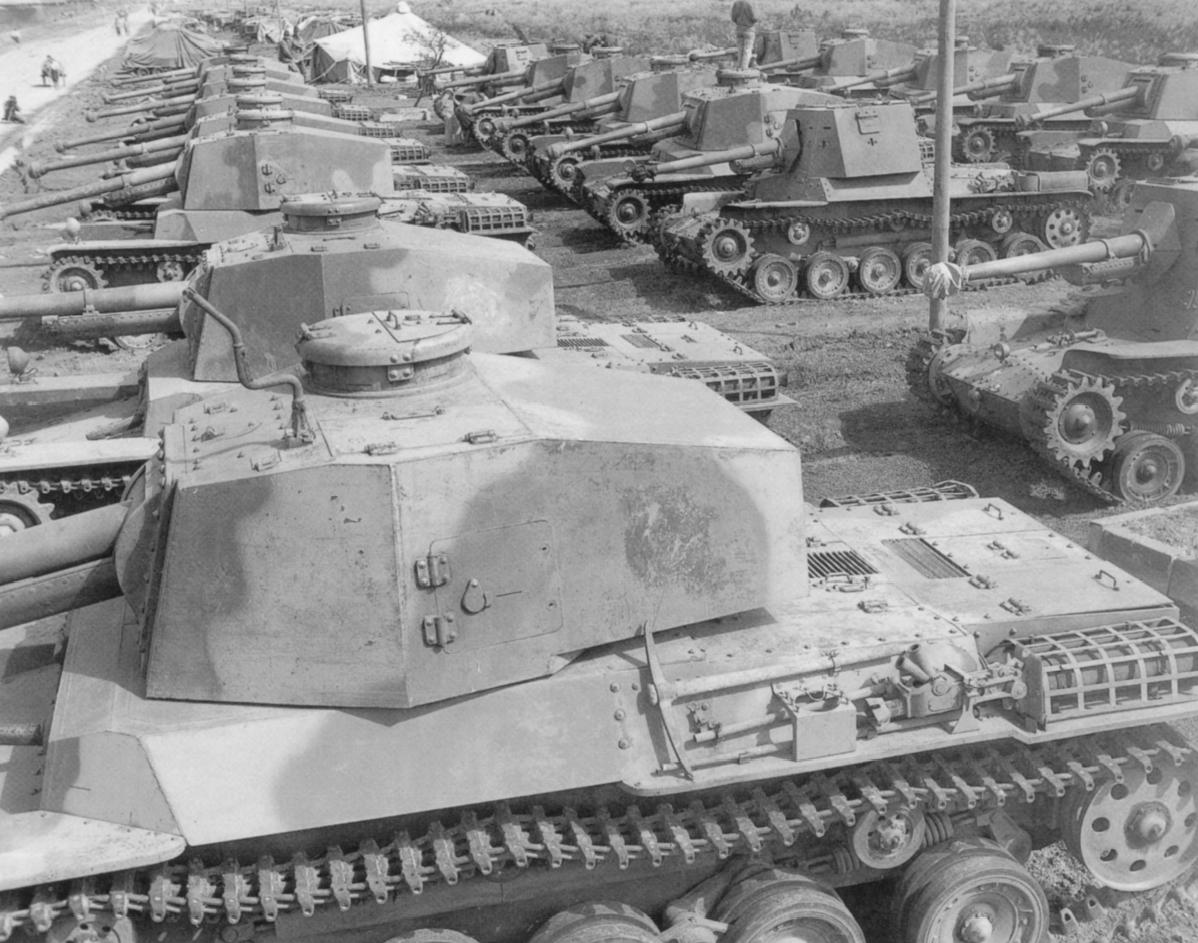
- Type 3 Chi-Nu tanks of the 4th Tank Division, with Type 3 Ho-Ni III self-propelled guns among them
- Active: 1944–1945
- Country: Empire of Japan
- Branch: Imperial Japanese Army
- Type: Armored division
- Garrison/HQ: Chiba (city), Japan
- Nickname: 鋼=Hagane (Steel)
- Engagements: World War II

The 4th Tank Division (戦車第4師団, Sensha Dai-yon Shidan), was one of four armored divisions of the Imperial Japanese Army in World War II.

== History ==
The 4th Tank Division was raised on July 6, 1944, in Chiba, near Tokyo. It lacked both infantry and self-propelled gun regiments. Similar to the German Panzer-Lehr-Division, it was created out of the training departments of the Armor School, Cavalry School, Field Artillery School and Military Engineering School of the Imperial Japanese Army Academy, its remaining students and staff. Assigned to the IJA 36th Army Corps, it was designated for the defense of the Japanese home islands against the projected Allied invasion.

The 4th Tank Division was based in Fukuoka on Kyushu. It was equipped with the finest and most advanced armaments, including a "significant" number of Type 3 Chi-Nu medium tanks and Type 3 Ho-Ni III tank destroyers; these being available at its depot before the end of the war. Following Japan's surrender on Sept 3, 1945, the 4th Tank Division was officially demobilized with the rest of the Imperial Japanese Army, without having seen combat.

== Commanding officer ==
	Name	From	To
1	Lieutenant General Shiori Nagura	8 July 1944	12 August 1945
2	Major General Prince Kan'in Haruhito	12 August 1945	16 August 1945
3	Lieutenant General Shiori Nagura	16 August 1945	30 September 1945

== Structure (1945) ==
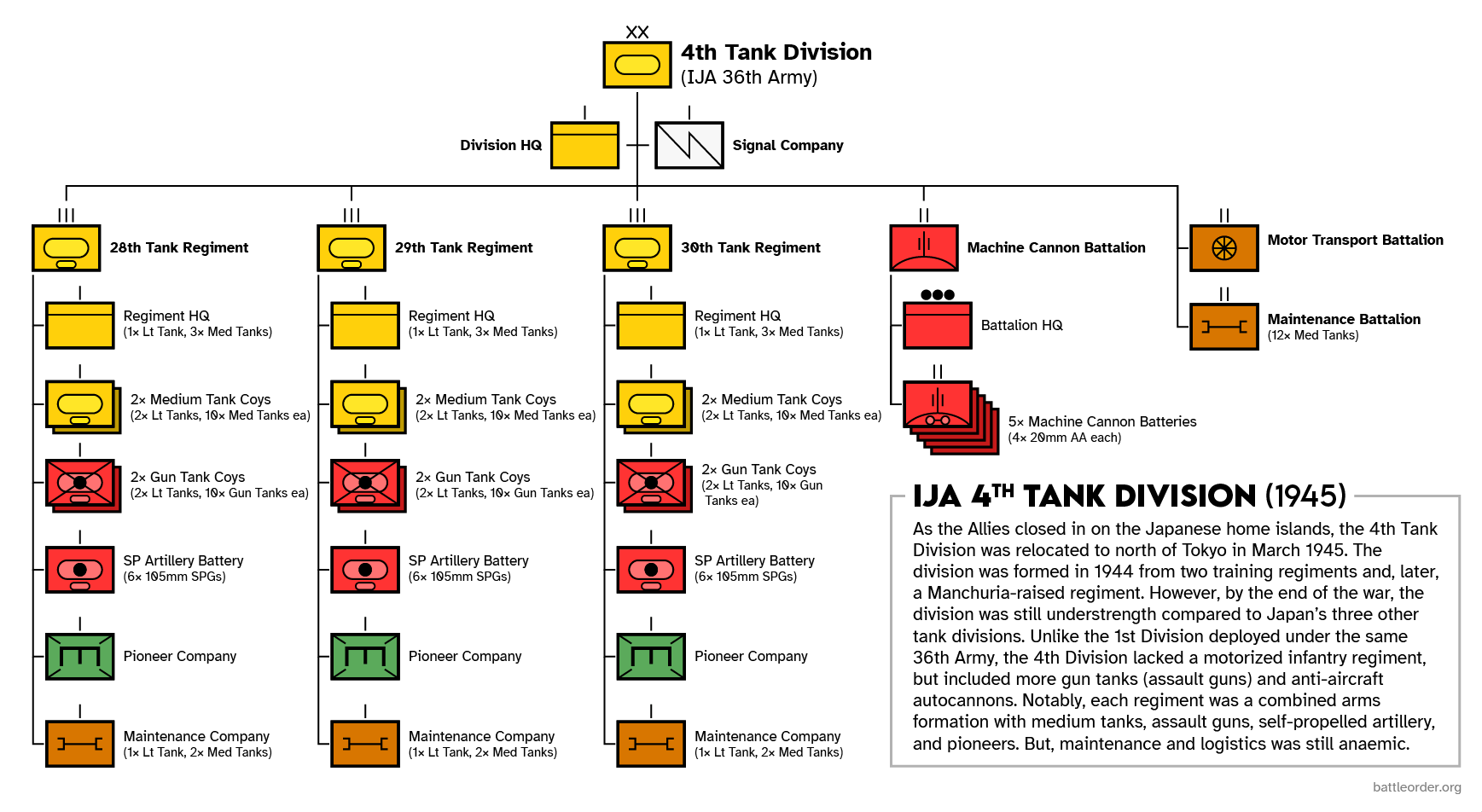
4th Tank Division (IJA) organization, 1945

The 4th Tank Division, after being relocated to Japan in 1945, consisted of a division headquarters, three tank regiments (roughly battalion-sized), one machine gun cannon battalion (anti-aircraft), one motor transport battalion, and one signal company.

- Division Headquarters
- 28th Tank Regiment
- 29th Tank Regiment
- 30th Tank Regiment
- Machine Gun Cannon Battalion (20mm AA)
- Motor Transport Battalion
- Signal Company

== See also ==
- List of Japanese armored divisions
