= Type 3 75 mm tank gun =

Japanese tank gun

The Type 3 75 mm tank gun was used as the main armament of the Imperial Japanese Army Type 3 Chi-Nu medium tank. It was one of the largest guns ever to be fitted on a World War II Japanese tank.

== Design and use ==
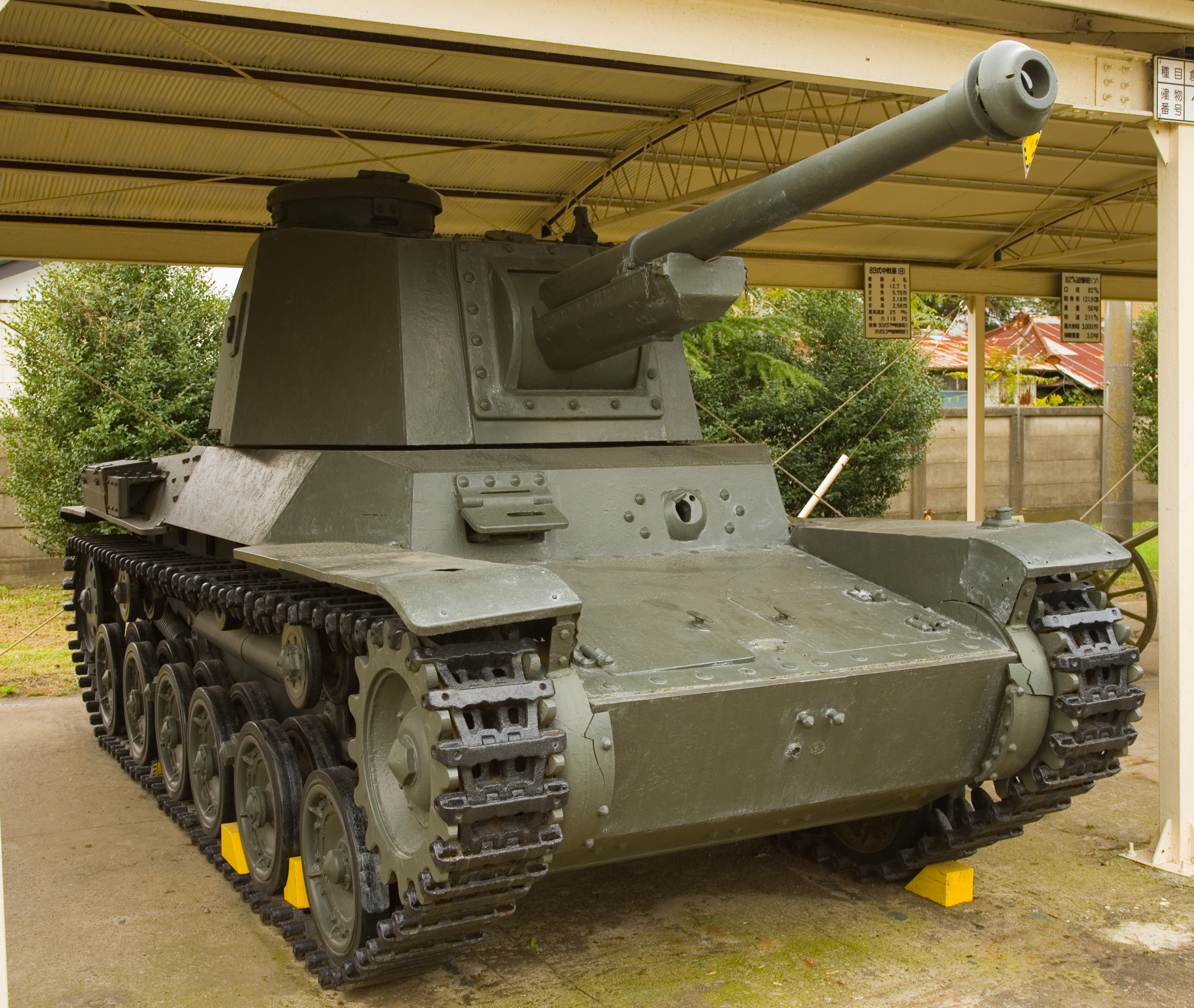
Type 3 Chi-Nu medium tank with the Type 3 75 mm tank gun

The Type 3 had a caliber of 75 mm (3.0 in), barrel length of 2.850 m (9 ft 4.2 in) (L/38). As fitted to the Type 3 Chi-Nu medium tank, elevation was from -10 to +25 degrees. Firing a shell at a muzzle velocity of 680 m/s (2,200 ft/s) it gave an armor penetration of 90 mm (3.5 in) at 100 m (110 yd) and 65 mm (2.6 in) at 1,000 m (1,100 yd). It shot a 6.6 kilogram projectile. This gun was based on the Japanese Type 90 field gun which in turn was loosely based on the French Schneider et Cie Canon de 85 mle 1927. The Type 3 gun was license-built by the Osaka Arsenal.

The Type 3 Chi-Nu, in which the gun was mounted, was the most powerful tank in regular series production for the Imperial Japanese Army during World War II. The Type 3 Chi-Nu was developed to cope with the M4 Sherman. By 1943, the low priority given to tank production meant that the Type 3 did not actually enter production until 1944. By that time, the material and industrial shortages faced by Japan caused production of the tank to be delayed. These tanks were allocated to the Japanese home islands to defend against the projected Allied Invasion. As the surrender of Japan occurred before that invasion, the Type 3 was never used in combat.

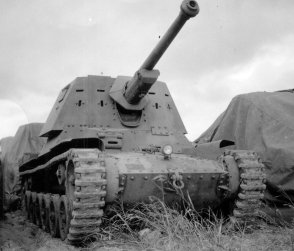
Type 3 Ho-Ni III with the Type 3 75 mm tank gun

Between 1944 and 1945, a total of 144 to 166 Type 3 Chi-Nu tanks were produced. One surviving Type 3 medium tank with its Type 3 75 mm tank gun is on display at the Japan Ground Self-Defense Force Military Ordnance Training School at Tsuchiura, Ibaraki, Japan.

The Type 3 tank gun was also the main armament for the Type 3 Ho-Ni III. The Ho-Ni III "gun tank" served as both self-propelled artillery and tank destroyer. It had a fully enclosed heptagonal armored casemate to address the issue of crew protection in close combat.
