= Type 90 75 mm field gun =

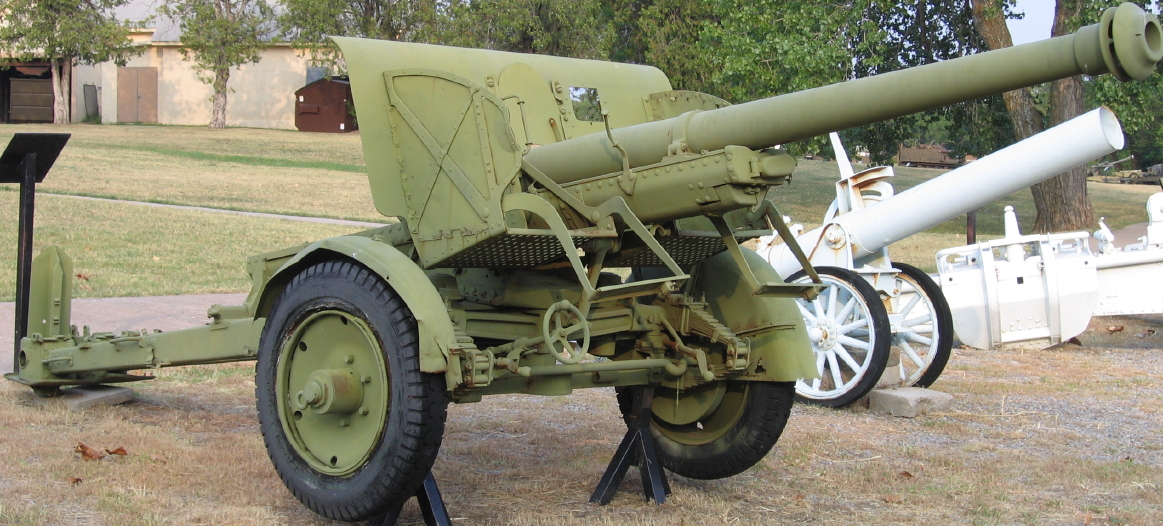
- Type 90 75 mm field gun (Motorized model) at the U.S. Army Field Artillery Museum, Ft. Sill, OK
- Type: Field gun
- Place of origin: Empire of Japan

Service history
- In service: 1932–1945
- Used by: Imperial Japanese Army
- Wars: Second Sino-Japanese War; Soviet-Japanese Border Wars; World War II

Production history
- Unit cost: Motorized model: 18,000 yen ($4,837 USD) in August 1939
- Produced: 1932–1945
- No. built: 786

Specifications
- Mass: 1,400 kg (3,086 lb) (firing); 2,000 kg (4,409 lb) (travel)
- Length: 5.23 m (17 ft 2 in) (firing); 3.8712 m (12 ft 8.41 in) (traveling)
- Barrel length: 2.883 metres (9 ft 6 in) L/38.4
- Width: 1.50 m (4 ft 11 in) Track; 1.75 m (5 ft 9 in) Maximum
- Height: 1.65 m (5 ft 5 in)
- Shell: 75 x 424mm R
- Shell weight: 6.56 kilograms (14.5 lb)
- Caliber: 75 mm (2.95 in)
- Action: Manual
- Breech: Horizontal sliding-block
- Recoil: Hydro-pneumatic
- Carriage: Split trail
- Elevation: -8° to +43°
- Traverse: 25° left, 25° right
- Rate of fire: 2 minutes 15 rpm, 15 minutes 4 rpm Continuous 100-120 rph
- Muzzle velocity: 683 m/s (2,241 ft/s)
- Maximum firing range: 14,960 metres (16,360 yd)
- Sights: panoramic

The Type 90 75 mm field gun (九〇式野砲, Kyūmaru-shiki yahō) was a field gun used by the Imperial Japanese Army during the Second Sino-Japanese War, Soviet-Japanese Border Wars and World War II. The Type 90 designation was given to this gun as it was accepted in the year 2590 of the Japanese calendar (1930). It was intended to replace the Type 38 75 mm field gun in front line combat units, but due to operational and budgetary constraints, the Type 38 continued to be used.

== History and development ==
Prior to World War I, the Imperial Japanese Army was largely equipped with Krupp cannons from Germany. After the Versailles Treaty, the Japanese switched to the French Schneider company, and purchased numerous examples for test and evaluation. With an army rearmament program starting in 1931, a new 75 mm field gun loosely based on the French Schneider et Cie Canon de 85 mle 1927 built for Greece was introduced, and labeled the "Type 90".

However, few units were built, and the design never achieved its intended purpose of replacing the Type 38 75 mm field gun. The Schneider design was very complex and expensive to build, requiring very tight dimensional tolerances that were beyond the limits of Japanese industry at the time. In particular, the recoil system required a high amount of complex maintenance, which was difficult to sustain in front line combat service.

== Design ==
The Type 90 75 mm field gun was unique among Japanese artillery pieces in that it had a muzzle brake. The carriage was of the split trail type. The Type 90 was built in two version: one with wooden wheels suitable for animal (horse) draft, and another with solid rubber tires and a stronger suspension for towing by motor vehicles. The latter variant was designated as the Motorized Type 90 75 mm field gun (機動九〇式野砲, Kidō Kyūmaru-shiki yahō) and weighed 200 kilograms (440 lb) more.

The Type 90 75 mm field gun was capable of firing high-explosive, armor-piercing, shrapnel, incendiary, smoke and illumination shells. Its range of 15,000 metres (16,000 yd) for a weight of 1,400 kilograms (3,100 lb) compared well with its contemporaries.

== Combat record ==
The Type 90 75 mm field gun was issued primarily to units based in Manchukuo, and was rarely deployed to the Pacific theatre of operations. Its initial use in combat was against the Soviet Red Army at the Battle of Nomonhan. When deployed later against Allied forces, it was often used as an anti-tank gun, as its high speed shells were effective against armored vehicles. It was also used at the Battle of the Philippines, Battle of Iwo Jima and Battle of Okinawa, often deployed together with armored units. The Type 90 continued to be used as field artillery until the surrender of Japan.

== Variants ==
The Type 90 formed the basis for the Type 3 75 mm tank gun used in the Type 3 Ho-Ni III Gun tank and Type 3 Chi-Nu medium tank.
