= Canon de 85 modèle 1927 Schneider =

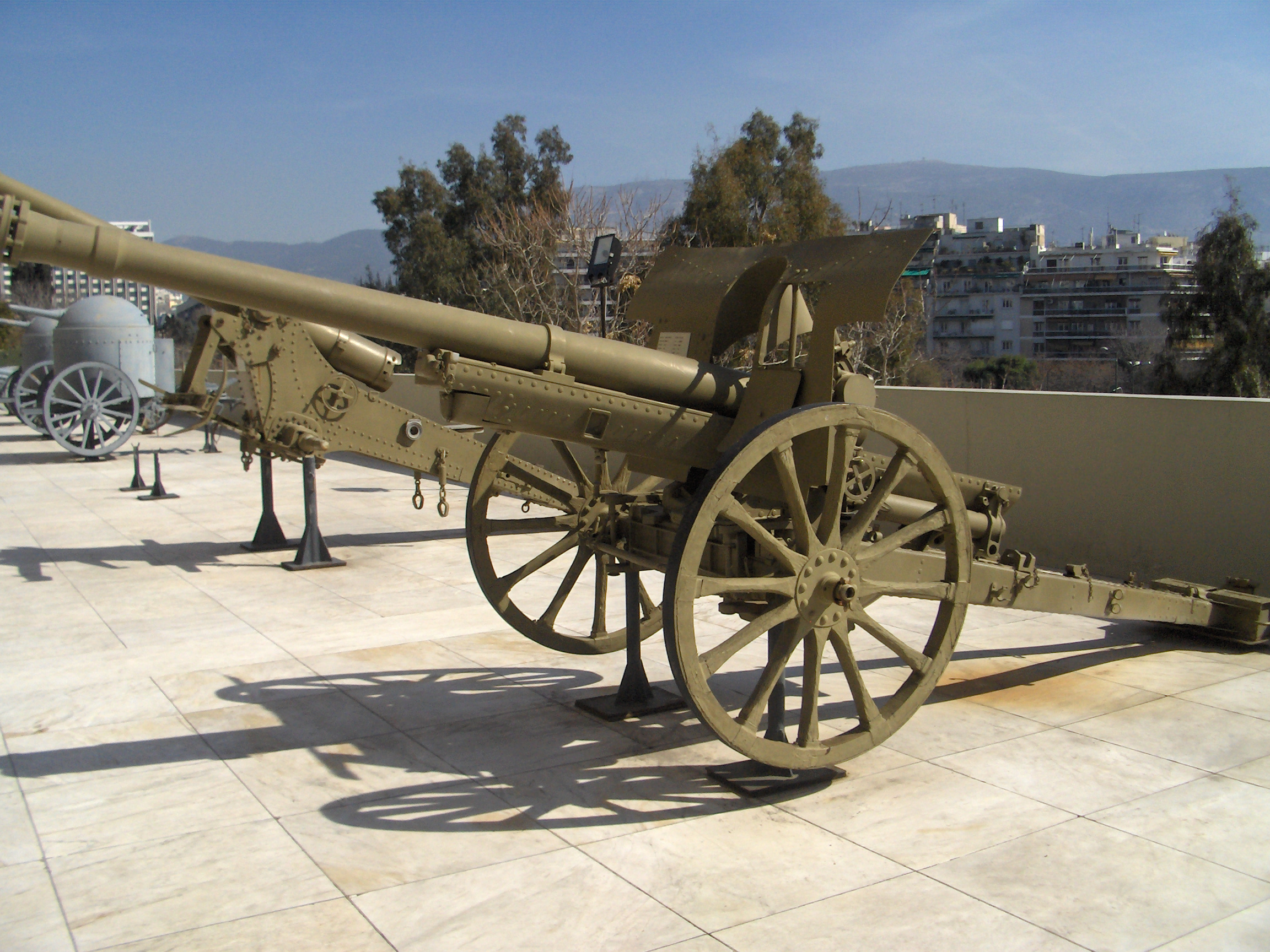
- At the War Museum in Athens
- Type: field gun
- Place of origin: France

Service history
- In service: 1927–1941
- Used by: Greece
- Wars: World War II

Production history
- Designer: Schneider
- Manufacturer: Schneider

Specifications
- Mass: 1,985 kilograms (4,376 lb)
- Barrel length: 2.96 metres (9 ft 9 in) L/34.8
- Shell: 10 kilograms (22 lb)
- Caliber: 85 mm (3.34 in)
- Carriage: Split trail
- Elevation: -6° to +65°
- Traverse: 54°
- Muzzle velocity: 670 m/s (2,198 ft/s)
- Maximum firing range: 15,150 metres (16,570 yd)

The Canon de 85 modèle 1927 Schneider (Greek: Πεδινό Πυροβόλο Σνάιντερ 85χιλ. (υπόδειγμα 1927); English: Schneider Field Gun 85 mm (model 1927)) was a field gun used by Greece during World War II. After the occupation of Greece, the Germans allotted this gun the designation of 8.5 cm Kanonehaubitze 287(g), but it is unknown if they actually used them themselves.

After the Versailles Treaty The Japanese switched to the French Schneider company, and purchased numerous examples for test and evaluation. With an Army rearmament program starting in 1931, a new 75 mm field gun loosely based on the Canon de 85 modèle 1927 Schneider was introduced, known as the Type 90 75 mm Field Gun.

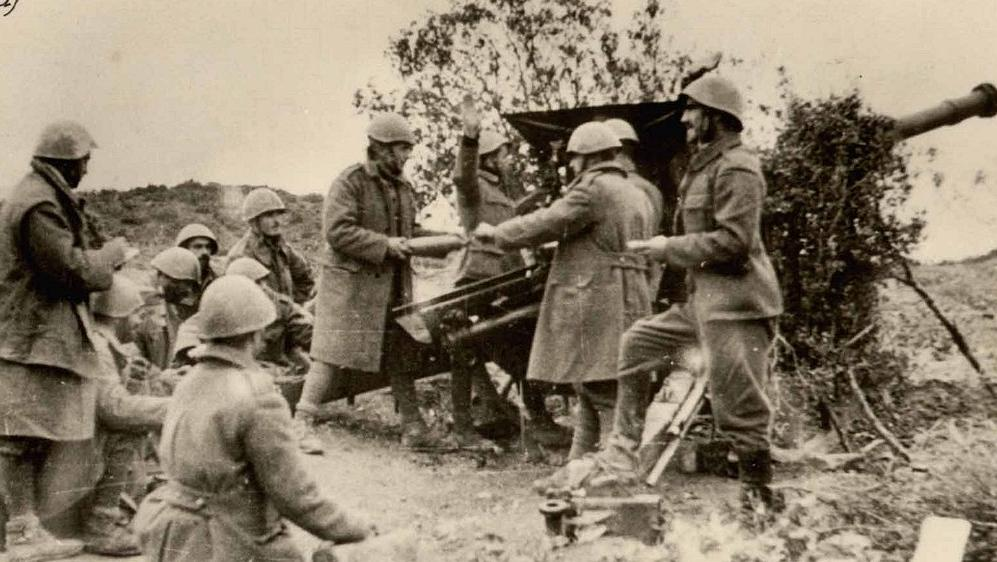
The Schneider 85 mm gun in action during the Greco-Italian War.
