= Type 3 Chi-Nu medium tank =

Type 3 Chi-Nu
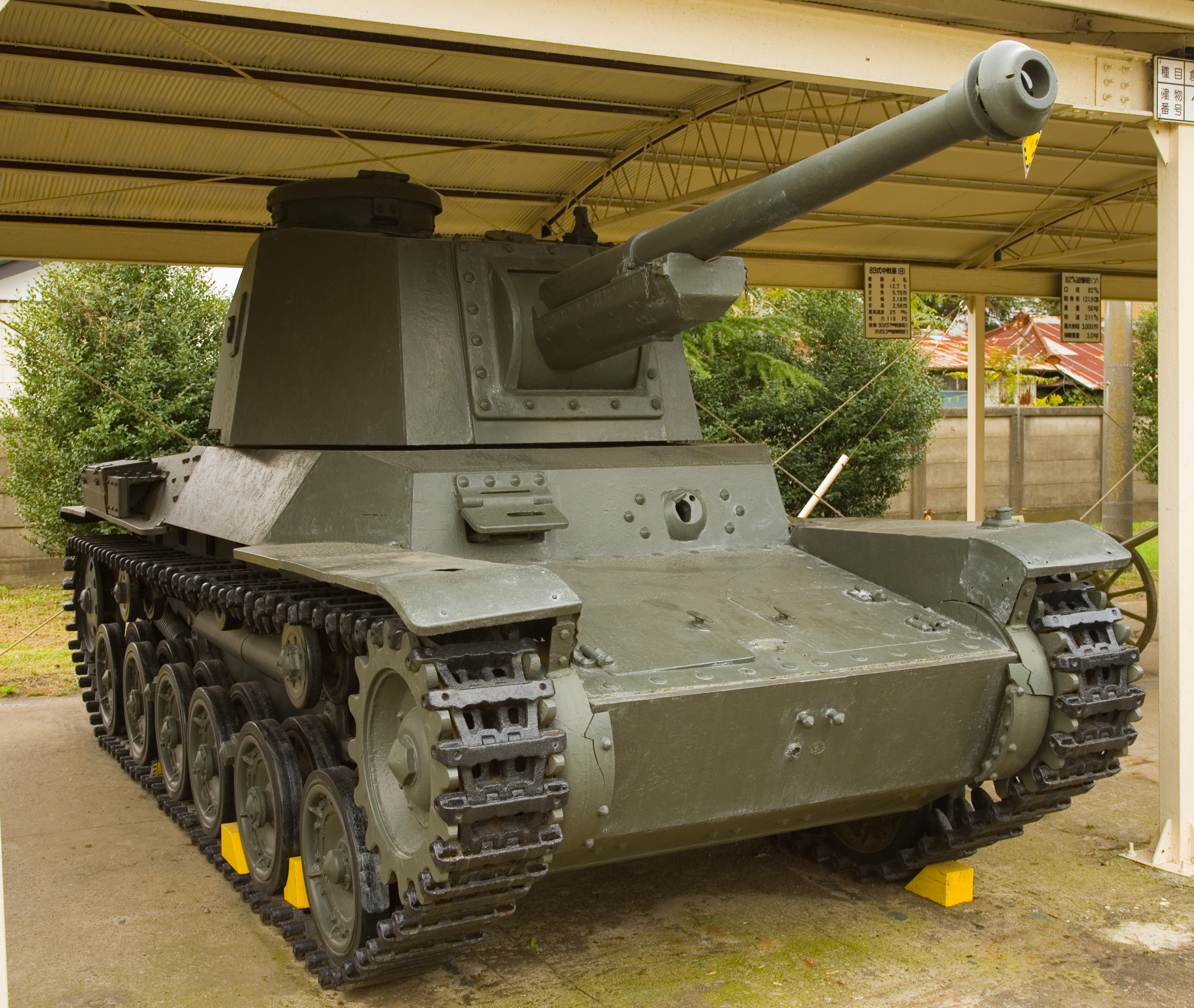
- A Type 3 Chi-Nu at the JGSDF Ordnance School in Tsuchiura, Japan
- Type: Medium tank
- Place of origin: Empire of Japan

Production history
- Designed: 1943
- Produced: 1944–1945
- No. built: 144 to 166

Specifications
- Mass: 19 tonnes (21 tons)
- Length: 5.64 m (18 ft 6 in)
- Width: 2.41 m (7 ft 11 in)
- Height: 2.68 m (8 ft 10 in)
- Crew: 5
- Armor: 20–50 mm
- Main armament: Type 3 75 mm tank gun (L/38) (Armor penetration: 90 mm at 100 m, 65 mm at 1,000 m)
- Secondary armament: 1 x 7.7 mm Type 97 machine gun
- Engine: Mitsubishi Type 100; 21.7 L V-12 diesel 240 hp (179 kW) at 2,000 rpm (12.63 hp/tonne)
- Suspension: bellcrank
- Operational range: 210 km (130 mi)
- Maximum speed: 39 km/h (24 mph)

Type 3 medium tank Chi-Nu (三式中戦車 チヌ, San-shiki chū-sensha Chi-nu; "Imperial Year 2603 Medium tank Model 10") was a medium tank of the Imperial Japanese Army in World War II. Like the Type 1 Chi-He, this tank was an improved version of the Type 97 Chi-Ha. It incorporated a Type 3 75 mm tank gun, one of the largest Japanese tank guns during the war.

The Chi-Nu did not see combat during the war. All produced units were retained for the defense of the Japanese Homeland in anticipation of an Allied invasion.

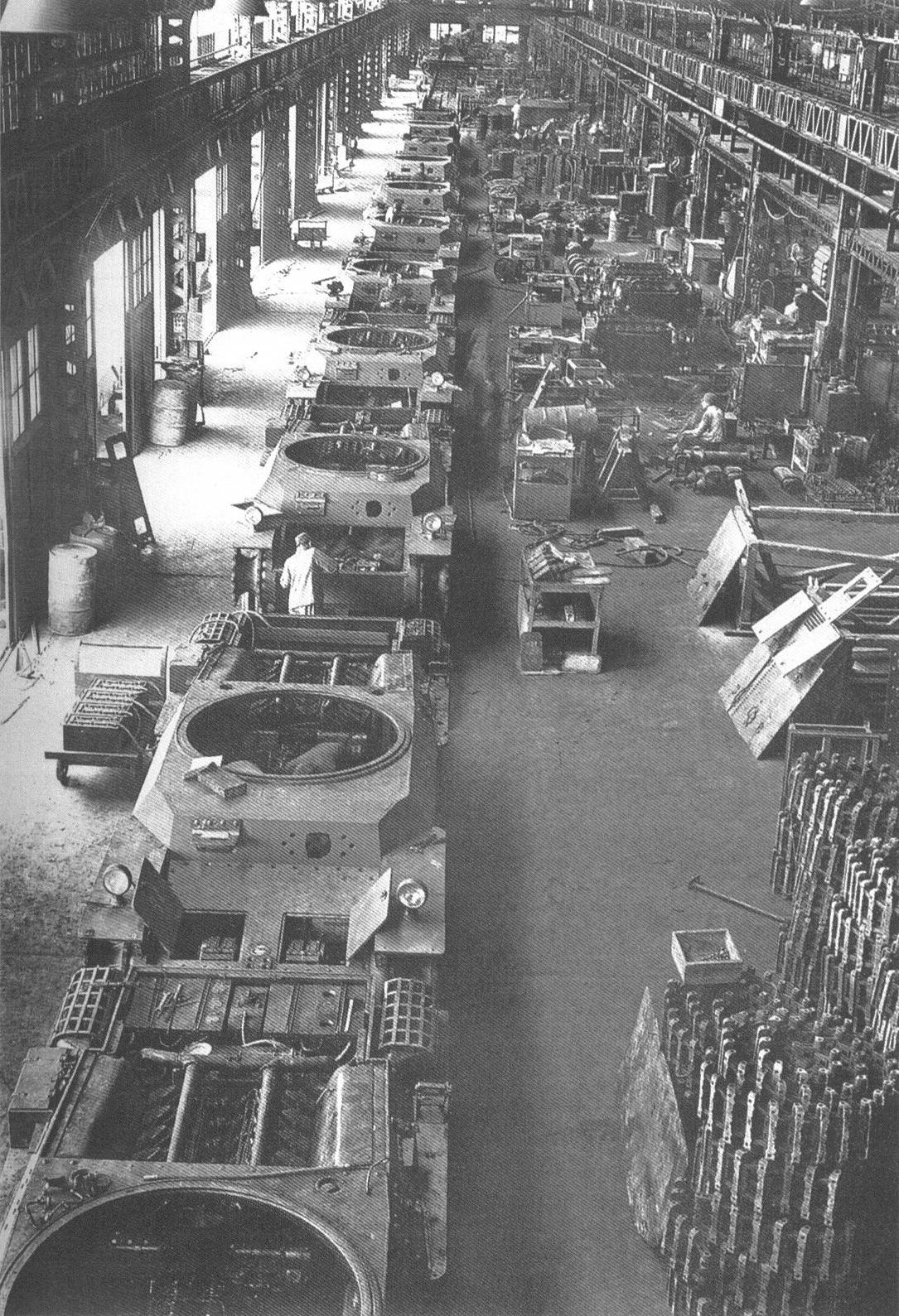
Type 3 Chi-Nu tank production line, 1945

== History and development ==
At the outbreak of the Pacific War, the Type 97 Chi-Ha medium tank and Type 95 Ha-Go light tank designs comprised the mainstay of the armored units of the Imperial Japanese Army. As the war progressed, these tanks started to face significant challenges posed by Allied tanks. In the Burma and Philippines Campaigns, the firepower of the 57 mm cannon mounted on the Type 97 was proven to be insufficient against Allied tanks. The Imperial Japanese Army therefore developed the Type 1 47 mm tank gun, which used a lighter high-explosive round with greater armor penetrating power. This gun was mounted on Type 97 Shinhoto Chi-Ha and Type 1 Chi-He medium tanks.

At the later stages of the war, large numbers of American M4 Sherman tanks arrived at the front line and increased pressure on Japanese armored forces. The Imperial General Headquarters (大本営, Daihon'ei) decided to develop a new medium tank to counter the enemy threat as well as a replacement for the Type 97.

The Army Technical Bureau had been working on the Type 4 Chi-To medium tank as the counter to the M4 Sherman, but there were problems and delays in the program. As a result, a stopgap tank was required. The Type 3 medium tank Chi-Nu was developed to cope with the M4 Sherman. Development of the Type 3 Chi-Nu occurred in 1943. The low priority given to tank production meant that the Type 3 did not actually enter production until 1944, by which time raw materials were in very short supply, and in 1945 much of Japan's industrial infrastructure had been destroyed by American strategic bombing. This led to its production run being severely curtailed. Only a total of between 144 and 166 units were produced. The Type 3 Chi-Nu was the last tank that was fielded by the Imperial Japanese armed forces, and was still in production at the end of the war.

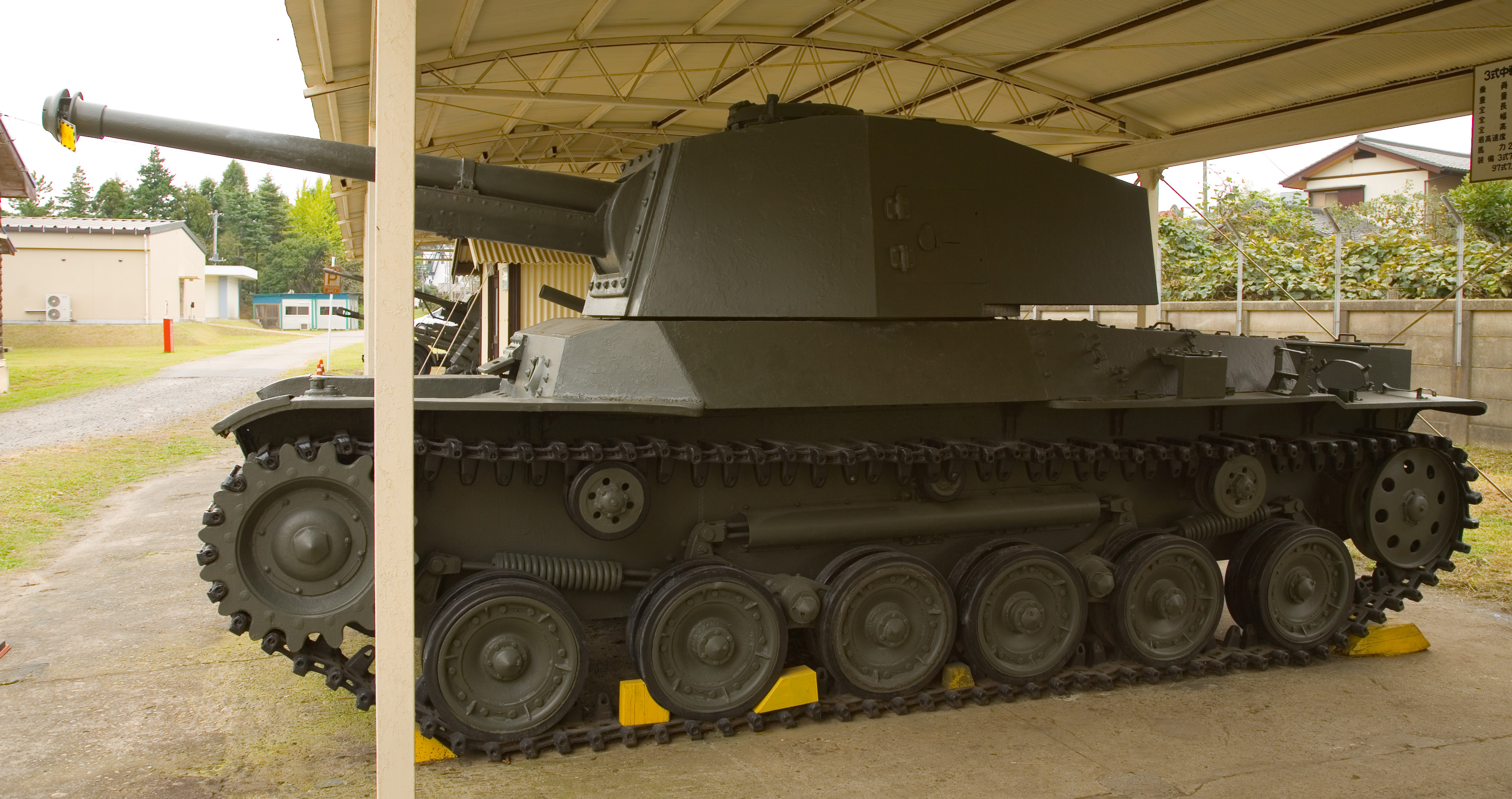
Side view of Type 3 Chi-Nu

== Design ==
=== Armor and protection ===
The Type 3 Chi-Nu retained the same chassis and suspension of the Type 1 Chi-He, but with the addition of an enlarged turret ring for the new large hexagonal gun turret with a commander's cupola. It was the last design based directly on Type 97 lineage. The thickest armor used was 50 mm on the front hull; it also had 25 mm on the turret, 25 mm on the sides and 20 mm on the rear deck.

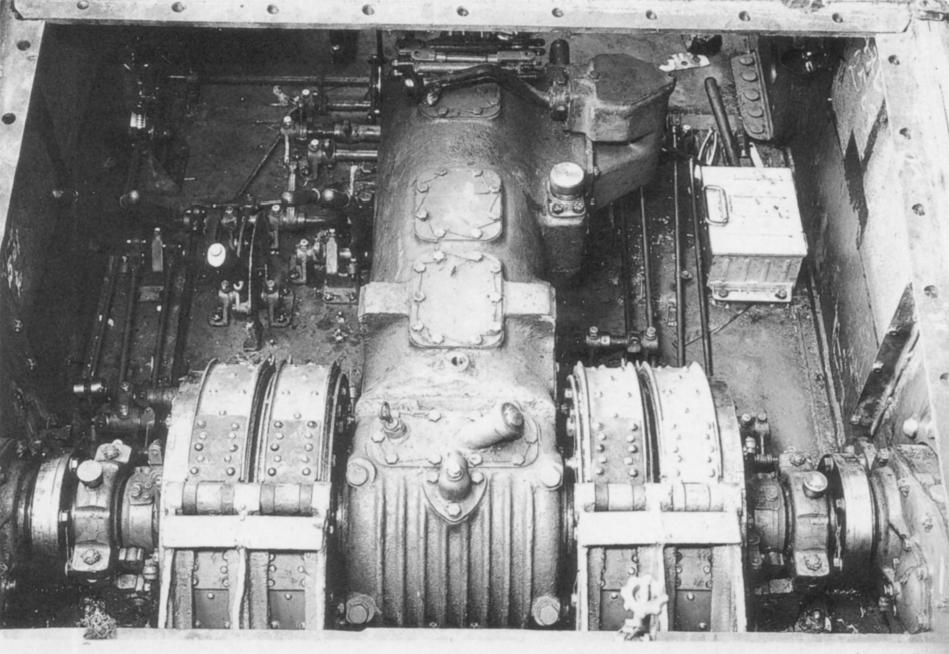
Type 3 Chi-Nu during assembly process, showing its transmission and partially installed controls

=== Armament ===
The main armament of the Type 3 Chi-Nu was the 75 mm Type 3 tank gun. The gun could be elevated between -10 and +25 degrees. Firing a shell at a muzzle velocity of 680 m/s (2,200 ft/s) it gave an armor penetration of 90 mm (3.5 in) at 100 m (110 yd) and 65 mm (2.6 in) at 1,000 m (1,100 yd). Secondary armament was a 7.7 mm Type 97 machine gun.

=== Mobility ===
The Chi-Nu had the same engine as the Type 1 Chi-He, producing 240 hp and a top speed of 39 km/h.

== Service record ==
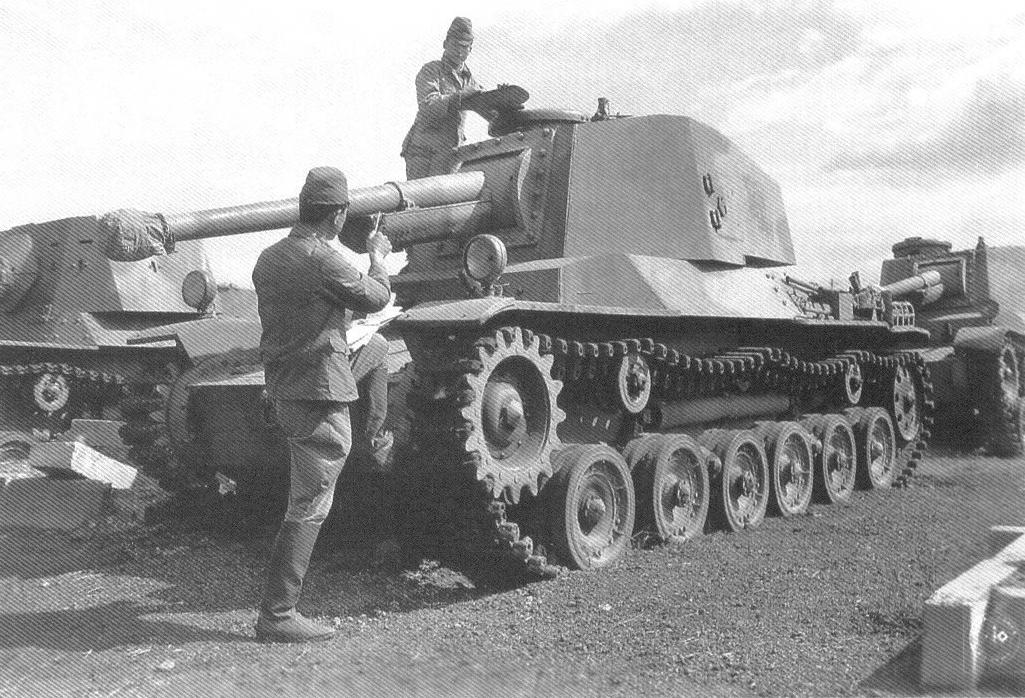
Type 3 Chi-Nu in 1945

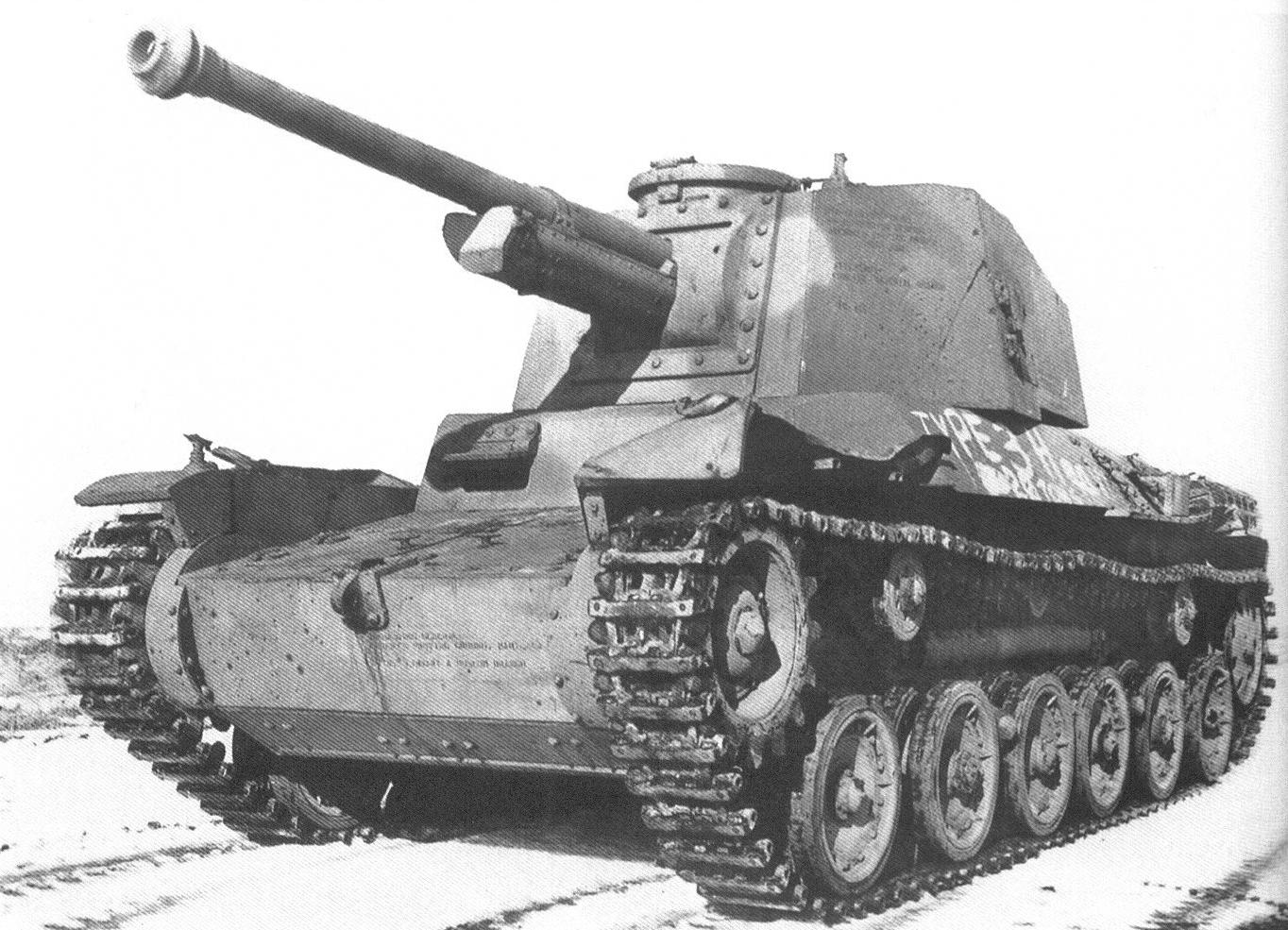
A Type 3 Chi-Nu captured by the Americans after the surrender

The Type 3 Chi-Nu was allocated to the Japanese home islands to defend against the projected Allied Invasion. They were to be part of the "Mobile Shock Force" to be used for counter-attacks against the Allied invasion. As the surrender of Japan occurred before that invasion, the Type 3 was never used in combat operations. The 4th Tank Division based in Fukuoka on Kyushu had a "significant" number of the Type 3 Chi-Nu tanks produced at its depot by the end of the war.

== Survivor ==
One surviving Type 3 medium tank is on display at the Japan Ground Self-Defense Force Military Ordnance Training School at Tsuchiura, Ibaraki, Japan.

== Variant ==
- Type 3 Chi-Nu Kai prototype/Chi-Nu II

A "modification plan" for the Chi-Nu was for it to be up gunned with the Type 5 75 mm tank gun (L/56.4) and a Type 4 Chi-To turret. The exact status on the progress of the Chi-Nu Kai prototype is unknown.

== See also ==
Japanese tanks of World War II

=== Tanks of comparable role, performance, and era ===
- Argentine Nahuel DL 43
- Australian Sentinel
- British Cromwell
- Canadian Ram II
- German Panzer IV
- Hungarian Turán III
- Italian Carro Armato P 40
- Italian P43 (proposal)
- Romanian 1942 medium tank (proposal)
- Soviet T-34
- United States M4 Sherman
