= List of Japanese infantry weapons used in the Second-Sino Japanese War =

This is a list of Japanese infantry weapons in Second Sino-Japanese War.

== Infantry regular artillery ==
- 7cm field gun (75 mm)
- 7 cm mountain gun (75mm)
- Type 31 75 mm field gun
- Type 31 75 mm mountain gun
- Type 41 75 mm mountain gun "Rentai Ho"(regimental artillery)
- Type 41 75 mm cavalry gun
- Type 90 75 mm field gun
- Type 94 75 mm mountain gun
- Type 95 75 mm field gun

== Infantry anti-tank gun ==
- Type 94 37 mm anti-tank gun
- Type 1 37 mm anti-tank gun
- Type 1 47 mm anti-tank gun
- Type Ra 37 mm anti-tank gun (local derivation of German PAK 35/36 captured to Chinese) for use in guadalcanal and Chinese front

== Infantry support gun ==
- Type 11 37 mm infantry gun
- Type 92 70 mm infantry gun "Daitai Ho"(battalion artillery)

== Infantry howitzer ==
- Krupp 12 cm david
- Krupp 15 cm howitzer
- Type 38 12 cm howitzer
- Type 38 15 cm howitzer
- Type 4 15 cm howitzer
- Type 91 10 cm howitzer
- Type 96 15 cm howitzer
- 28 cm howitzer
- Type 45 24 cm howitzer
- Type 7 30 cm david

== Infantry heavy artillery cannons ==
- Krupp 10.5 cm cannon
- Type 38 10 cm cannon
- Type 14 10 cm cannon
- Type 92 10 cm cannon
- Type 45 15 cm cannon
- Type 7 10 cm cannon
- Type 7 15 cm cannon
- Type 11 75 mm cannon
- Type 89 15 cm cannon
- Type 96 24 cm howitzer
- Type 96 15 cm cannon

== Tank guns ==
- Type 97 57 mm tank gun
- 37 mm tank gun
- Type 1 47 mm tank gun

== Infantry mortars ==
- Type 11 70 mm infantry mortar
- Type 94 90 mm infantry mortar
- Type 96 150 mm infantry mortar
- Type 97 81 mm infantry mortar
- Type 97 90 mm infantry mortar
- Type 97 150 mm infantry mortar
- Type 99 81 mm infantry mortar
- Type 2 120 mm infantry mortar
- Type 98 50 mm mortar
- 15 cm heavy mortar
- Type 14 27 cm heavy mortar
- Type 98 32 cm spigot mortar

== Infantry anti-aircraft gun ==
- Type 98 20 mm AA machine cannon
- Type 2 20 mm AA machine cannon
- 20 mm twin AA machine cannon
- Model 96 25 mm dual-purpose anti-tank/anti-aircraft gun
- Vickers Type 40 mm dual purpose anti-tank/anti-aircraft gun
- AA mine discharger (7 or 8 cm)
- Type 11 75 mm AA gun
- Type 88 75 mm AA gun
- Type 4 75 mm AA gun
- Type 99 88 mm AA gun (based on Krupp 88 mm Flak of the German Navy (8.8 cm/45 SK C/30), which was captured in China)
- Type 14 10 cm AA gun

== Infantry rifles ==
- Type 38 rifle
- Type 38 cavalry rifle
- Type 44 cavalry rifle
- Type 97 sniper rifle
- Type 99 rifle
- Type 99 sniper rifle
- TERA rifles (Type 100 rifle, Type 1 rifle, Type 2 rifle)

== Infantry pistols ==
- Type 26 9 mm pistol
- Type 14 8 mm Nambu pistol
- Nambu Type 94 8 mm pistol

== Infantry submachine gun ==
- Bergmann submachine gun
- Type 100 submachine gun

== Infantry machine guns ==
- Type 11 light machine gun
- Type 96 light machine gun
- Type 99 light machine gun
- Type 3 heavy machine gun
- Type 92 heavy machine gun
- Type 1 heavy machine gun
- Type 97 heavy tank machine gun

== Infantry hand grenade ==
- Type 10 grenade
- Type 91 grenade
- Type 97 grenade
- Type 99 grenade
- Type 10 grenade discharger
- Type 89 grenade discharger

== Infantry anti-tank weapons ==
- Type 97 20 mm AT rifle
- Type 93 mine
- Type 99 AT mine
- Type 2 AT rifle grenade
- Rifle grenade dischargers
- Type 3 AT grenade

== Other infantry equipment ==
- Type 100 flamethrower
- Type 98 military sword
- Infantry armor
