= Organization of the Imperial Japanese Army =

This article details the organization of the Imperial Japanese Army.

== Basic organisational structure ==
At the outbreak of the Second World War, the basic structure of the Imperial Japanese Army was as follows:

- Imperial Army (~230,000–250,000 men) – Commanded by Marshal HIH Prince Kan-in-Kotohito
- General Army (総軍 Sō-gun equivalent to the Army Group or Front) – Commanded by a Marshal or General
- Area Army (方面軍 Hōmen-gun 1942–1945 equivalent to the Field Army) – Commanded by a General or Lieutenant-General
- Army (equivalent to the Corps)- Commanded by a Lieutenant-General
- Division (~20,000 men) – Consisted of 3 infantry regiments, 1 cavalry regiment, 1 artillery regiment, 1 engineering battalion and 1 army service corps. Commanded by a Lieutenant-General.
- Independent Brigade (~5600 men) – Consisted of 5 battalions, along with other units. Commanded by a Major-General.
- Regiment (~3,800 men) – Consisted of 3 battalions, each of 1,100 men, along with other units. Commanded by a Colonel.
- Battalion (~1,100 men) – Consisted of 4 companies, each of 180 men, along with other units. Commanded by a Lieutenant-Colonel.
- Company (~180 men) – Consisted of 3 platoons, each of 54 men, and a headquarters unit with 19 men. Commanded by a Captain.
- Platoon (~50 men) – Consisted of 3 sections, each of 15 men. Commanded by a Lieutenant.
- Section (~12–15 men) – Consisted of 3 teams, each of about 4 men. Led by a Corporal.
- Team (4 men) – Led by a Senior Private.

== Army ==
- See article List of Armies of the Japanese Army

In the Imperial Japanese Army (IJA), the term Gun, literally meaning "army", was used in a different way to the military forces of other countries. A So-Gun, meaning "General Army", was the term used in the IJA for an army group. Of a similar but slightly lower status was a Haken Gun, or "Expeditionary Army". A Homen Gun ("Area Army" or "Theatre Army") was equivalent to the field armies of other nations and a Gun ("Army") was equivalent to a corps in other armies.

== Divisional ==
- List of Japanese Armored Divisions
- List of Japanese Infantry Divisions
- List of air divisions of the Imperial Japanese Army

As the IJA was an infantry force the most common type of division was the infantry division. Later four tank and one parachute division were formed. The first 18 infantry divisions were originally formed as square divisions, and after 1938, most of the remainder were formed as triangular divisions with the security divisions being binary divisions. During the course of its existence the IJA organized three Guards Divisions and over 220 infantry divisions of various types (A/Reinforced, B/Standard, C/Counter-insurgency). On 7 December the IJA had two divisions serving in Japan/Korea and 50 serving abroad, most in China. During the war another 117 were raised for foreign service and 56 were raised for national defense. These totaled 223 including the Imperial Guard. Of this total no more than 35, that is one fifth of the IJA infantry division total, fought in the Pacific theatre.

=== Organisation ===
The Standard, or Type "B" division was organised as:

- Headquarters (300)
- Infantry brigade (11600)
  - Headquarters
  - Three infantry regiments, each of:
    - Headquarters
    - Three infantry battalions, each of:
      - Headquarters and escort
      - Four infantry (rifle) companies
      - Machine gun company, with 12 x heavy machine guns
      - Battalion gun platoon, with 2 x 70mm Type 92 Battalion Guns
    - Escort and signal companies
    - Regimental gun company, with 4 x Type 41 75 mm Mountain Guns
    - Regimental anti-tank gun company, with 6 x Type 94 37 mm Anti-Tank Guns or Type 1 47 mm Anti-Tank Guns
- Field artillery regiment (2300)
  - Headquarters and escort
  - Three field artillery battalions, each of:
    - Headquarters and transport
    - Three field artillery companies, each with 4 x 75mm field guns (Type 38, Type 90 or Type 95)
- Cavalry regiment (battalion) (950)
  - Headquarters and escort
  - Three mounted companies
  - Machine gun company, with 6 x heavy machine guns
- Engineer regiment (battalion) (900)
  - Four engineer companies
  - Materials company
- Transport regiment (1800)
  - Up to six companies, with either carts, pack horses, or motor transport
- Divisional signals (250)
- Medical Unit (900)
- Up to four Field Hospitals, each of 250 personnel (1000)
- Epidemic Prevention and Water Purification Department (120)
- Ordnance unit (50)
- Veterinary unit (50)

Total personnel (19,770)

It was common for a Mountain Artillery regiment, with a total of 3400 men and 36 x Type 94 75 mm Mountain Guns, to be substituted for the Field Artillery regiment, especially for operations in rough terrain. A Reconnaissance regiment, with a mix of mounted, motorized infantry and anti-tank companies, could replace the Cavalry regiment.

The Reinforced or Type "A" division generally substituted medium artillery companies with 4 x Type 91 10 cm Howitzer or long-range Type 92 10 cm Cannon for one or more field artillery companies in the field artillery regiment. It might also have an attached medium artillery battalion with three companies each of 4 x Type 96 15 cm Howitzer or long-range Type 89 15 cm Cannon, and an attached tank regiment (battalion). Conversely, the Type "C" division would lack artillery and other supporting arms.

Organisation of the 3 Type divisions
| subdivision | Type A | Type B | Type C |
|---|---|---|---|
| Infantry Regiment | 3 x 5,687 | 3 x 3,845 | 2 x 4,750 |
| Artillery Regiment Or Mountain Artillery Regiment | 1 x 2,379 1 x 3,400 | 1 x 2,480 1 x 3,400 | |
| Medium artillery regiment | 1 x 951 men | | |
| Reconnaissance regiment Or Cavalry regiment | 1 x 730 1 x 950 | 1 x 730 1 x 950 | |
| Tank unit | 1 x 717 | | |
| Engineer Regiment | 1 x 1,012 | 1 x 900 | 1 x 600 |
| Transportation regiment | 1 x 2,729 | 1 x 2,480 | 1 x 1,800 |
| Tankette unit | | 1 x 100 | |
| Weaponry | 10,000 rifles 405 LMGs 112 HMGs 457 Grenade dischargers 40 37 mm anti-tank guns 36 70 mm battalion guns 24 75 mm regimental guns 24 105 mm guns 12 150 mm howitzers 13 tankettes/armoured cars 48 medium tanks | 9,000 rifles 382 LMGs 112 HMGs 340 Grenade dischargers 22 37 mm anti-tank guns 18 70 mm battalion guns 12 75 mm regimental guns 36 75 mm field/mountain guns 7-17 tankettes/armoured cars | 6,950 rifles 110 LMGs 32 HMGs 112 Grenade dischargers 16 light mortars 8 70mm battalion guns |
| Total (as standard) | 29,408 men 9,906 horses 502 vehicles | 20,000 men 7,500 horses | 13,000 men 2,600 horses |

=== Brigades and equivalents ===
The Japanese Imperial Army had two types of Mixed Brigades.

- The divisional Mixed Brigade was the semi-permanent detachment of a brigade from an Infantry Division with various Divisional support units or units attached from its Corps or Army. This provided a combined arms force of infantry, artillery, cavalry and other support units.
  - List of IJA Mixed Brigades
- The Independent Mixed Brigade was a detachment composed of various units detached from other units or independent support units formed together in a brigade. The first two Independent Mixed Brigades, formed by the Kwantung Army in the 1930s were the IJA 1st Independent Mixed Brigade and the IJA 11th Independent Mixed Brigade. Each of these brigades were organized in a unique manner and one of them, the 11th, was later formed into the IJA 26th Division. Later a series of Independent Mixed Brigades were formed for the purpose of garrisoning the large territories of China captured in the early phase of the Second Sino-Japanese War. This variety for China was usually organized with five infantry battalions, an artillery unit, and labor troops. In the Pacific theater they had different and more varied configurations of subordinate units. Towards the end of the Burma Campaign, some were hastily formed from line-of-communication troops, and even naval personnel and conscripted Japanese civilian workers.
  - List of IJA Independent Mixed Brigades
- The Independent Infantry Brigade; several of these were raised as garrison units, mostly for China.
  - List of IJA Independent Infantry Brigades
- The 1st to 4th Amphibious Brigades were formed for use in the Pacific theater. These 5,500 man Sea-Landing Brigades, were used to conduct amphibious assaults on an island but afterwards they stayed to garrison that island.

=== Regiments ===
The IJA maintained two types of Independent Regiments, both were used to provide garrisons in occupied areas.

- Independent Mixed Regiments: contained an infantry regiment with various support elements such as: an artillery company, engineers, supply and services, etc.
- Independent Regiments: the basic IJA infantry regiment without any attachments.

=== Detachments ===
Detachments were particular military formations of the Imperial Japanese Army. Similar to German Kampfgruppen, these detachments were usually a force of infantry, artillery, armor, and other support units which were temporarily assigned for independent action and had a special mission. They were usually named after their commanders or the area in which they were to operate, and could be any size below division.

=== Cavalry ===
Cavalry units were formed in regiments most were either operating attached to infantry divisions or directly under a brigade attached to an army prior to the formation of the IJA Cavalry Group on 21 April 1933. There were three cavalry brigades: the IJA 1st Cavalry Brigade, IJA 3rd Cavalry Brigade, and IJA 4th Cavalry Brigade.

=== Other units ===
==== Unit 731 ====
Unit 731 were covert medical experiment units which conducted biological warfare research and development through human experimentation during the Second Sino-Japanese War (1937–1945) and World War II. Unit 731 responsible for some of the most notorious war crimes. Initially set up as a political and ideological section of the Kempeitai military police of pre-Pacific War Japan, they were meant to counter the ideological or political influence of Japan's enemies, and to reinforce the ideology of military units.

==== Kempeitai Auxiliary units ====
Kempeitai Auxiliary units consists of regional ethnic forces in occupied areas. Troops supplemented the Kempeitai and were considered part of the organization but were forbidden by law to rise above the rank of Shocho (Sergeant Major). According to United States Army's TM-E 30-480 Handbook On Japanese Military Forces, there were over 36,000 regular members of the Kempeitai at the end of the war; this did not include the many ethnic "auxiliaries". As many foreign territories fell under the Japanese military occupation during the 1930s and the early 1940s, the Kempeitai recruited a large number of locals in those territories. Taiwanese and Koreans were used extensively as auxiliaries to police the newly occupied territories in Southeast Asia, although the Kempeitai recruited French Indochinese (especially, from among the Cao Dai religious sect), Malaysians and others. The Kempeitai may have trained Trinh Minh The, a Vietnamese nationalist and military leader. Some sources report that the Kempeitai recruited criminals as law enforcers.

== Recruitment ==
=== Conscription ===
Conscription of all able-bodied males aged 17 (in practice from the age of 20) to 40 was instituted in 1873 and revised in 1927. Once called up, candidates were given a medical examination and classified as one of the following:

- Class I-A: "fit for active service"
- Class II:
  - B-1: "fit for active service with minor reservations"
  - B-2: "fit for active service with reservations"
- Class III-C: "unfit for active service, but fit for national service"
- Class IV-D: "physically unfit; exempted from all service" (after two successive examinations) or automatically exempted from all service
- Class V-E: "fitness undetermined; examination postponed to later date"

Upon receiving their classifications, peace-time Class I-A recruits were enlisted by lottery into either the jobi hei-eki (Regular Army and Imperial Navy) category, consisting of the gen-eki (active service) and the yobi-eki (primary reserve service) sub-categories, or into the kobi hei-eki (secondary reserve service) category. Those in the "gen-eki" sub-category would serve for two years in the army or three in the navy. After this period, they would be placed on the primary reserve service list (yobi-eki) for five years and four months in the army or four years in the navy, and would be subsequently placed on the secondary reserve service list after 10 years in the army (five in the navy) before being placed on the national service list (kokumin hei-eki) after 17 years and four months of army service (or 12 years of naval service). A similar but less stringent path was set out for those enlisted into the primary or secondary reserve categories; they would also end their service on the national service list. The least rigorous path was for those enlisted into the hoju hei-eki (replenishment territorial army and naval volunteer reserve), who would end their service on the national service list.

In peace-time, Class II recruits were not recruited, but were assigned to national service. In wartime, Class II B-1 and Class II B-2 recruits were enrolled into the hoju hei-eki category, with II B-1 recruits enlisted into the first supplementary territorial army and naval volunteer reserve and II B-2 recruits enlisted into the second supplementary territorial army and naval volunteer reserve, respectively. II B-1 recruits would serve for two years and four months in the territorial army or one year in the naval volunteer reserve; II B-2 recruits would serve for 12 years and four months in the territorial army or 11 years and four months in the naval volunteer reserve. Upon reaching the age of 40 in peace-time, all soldiers in Classes I and II would be placed on the national service list and released from regular duties.

In practice, total conscription of the available population was only instituted during the Second World War. Before then, only a proportion of the secondary reserve service had been called to active duty, during the Russo-Japanese War. Class III-C recruits were automatically assigned to national service if necessary. Conscripts classified as Class IV-D were reexamined the following year; if they could not be reclassified into any of the first three classes, they were officially exempted from all military service. Sole supporters of families and criminals sentenced to over six years penal servitude were automatically listed as Class IV-D and exempted from all service. Students at certain higher secondary schools were classified as Class V-E until they had finished their studies or upon reaching the age of 27, whichever came first. Japanese students studying abroad were also classed as Class V-E until reaching the age of 37.

From December 1927, conscripts who had completed a course of study with the requisite marks at a government-run Young Men's Training Institute ("Seinen Kunrenshou"), the curriculum of which included 200 hours of military training, could have their period of active service reduced to 18 months. Normal-school graduates with the requisite marks had their active service reduced to five months. Graduates of middle and higher schools who had completed courses in military training with the requisite marks were required to serve one year for middle-school graduates or for 10 months for higher-school graduates.

=== Salaries, benefits and pensions ===
Salaries and pensions for Imperial soldiers and sailors were very low by Western standards. On the eve of the Second World War, the yen had a value of $0.23. No true exchange rate existed for the yen during the war years, and wartime inflation reduced the yen to a fraction of its pre-war value.

Officer cadets were paid a yearly salary of ¥670 ($154.10 in 1941 dollars). Second lieutenants were paid ¥850 yearly ($195.50), lieutenants ¥1020–1130 ($234.60–259.90) and captains ¥1470–1900 ($338.10-437). Majors were paid ¥2330 yearly ($535.90), lieutenant-colonels ¥3220 ($740.60) and colonels ¥4150 ($954.60). Major-generals were paid ¥5000 yearly ($1150), lieutenant-generals ¥5800 ($1334) and full generals ¥6600 ($1518).

== Arsenals ==
The Imperial Japanese Army managed various Arsenals:

- Japanese Army Sagami Arsenal: with Mitsubishi, developed and manufactured tanks
- Japanese Army Osaka Arsenal: with Mitsubishi and Hitachi manufactured tanks and artillery
- Japanese Army Sasebo Arsenal: with Mitsubishi, manufactured tanks
- Japanese Army Heijo Arsenal: with Nambu, manufactured hand and long infantry weapons
- Japanese Army Mukden Arsenal: with Nambu, manufactured infantry weapons
- Japanese Army Kokura Arsenal: with Nambu, manufactured small arms and Machine Guns
- Japanese Army Tokyo Arsenal: the Army administrative and testing center related with light and heavy weapons production
- Japanese Army Tachikawa Arsenal: dedicated to develop and manufacture aircraft for the Imperial Japanese Army Air Service
- Japanese Army Koishikawa Arsenal (Tokyo)
