= Type 38 =

Type 38 may refer to the following Japanese weapons:

- Type 38 rifle
- Type 38 cavalry rifle
- Type 38 75 mm Field Gun
- Type 38 10 cm Cannon
- Type 38 15 cm howitzer
