= Type 95 =

Type 95 can refer to:

- Kawasaki Ki-10, Allied reporting name "Perry", a Japanese fighter also designated the Army Type 95 Fighter
- Nakajima E8N, Allied reporting name "Dave", a Japanese scout plane also designated the Navy Type 95 Reconnaissance Seaplane Model 1
- QBZ-95, Chinese assault rifle
- Type 95 Collapsible Boat, used by the Imperial Japanese Army
- Type 95 Ha-Go, a Japanese light tank
- Type 95 heavy tank, a Japanese heavy tank
- Type 95 reconnaissance car, used by the Japanese from 1937
- Type 95 SPAAA, a Chinese anti-aircraft vehicle
- Type 95 torpedo, a torpedo used by the Imperial Japanese Navy
- Type 95 75 mm field gun, a field gun used by the Imperial Japanese Army from 1936 to 1945

== See also ==
- 95 (disambiguation)
- T95 (disambiguation)
