= Type 14 10 cm cannon =

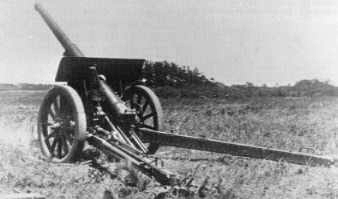
- Type 14 10 cm cannon
- Type: Field gun
- Place of origin: Empire of Japan

Service history
- In service: 1925–1945
- Used by: Imperial Japanese Army
- Wars: World War II

Production history
- Designer: Osaka Arsenal
- Produced: 1925–?
- No. built: 60

Specifications
- Mass: 1,500 kilograms (3,300 lb) Firing; 1,979 kg (4,363 lb) Traveling
- Length: 4.72 m (15 ft 6 in) Firing; 8.94 m (29 ft 4 in) Traveling
- Barrel length: 3.556 metres (11 ft 8 in) L/34.2
- Width: 1.57 m (5 ft 2 in) Track; 1.84 m (6 ft 0 in) Maximum
- Height: 1.73 m (5 ft 8 in)
- Shell: 105 x 464mm R
- Shell weight: 15.77 kilograms (34 lb 12 oz)
- Caliber: 105 mm (4.13 in)
- Breech: interrupted screw
- Recoil: hydro-pneumatic
- Carriage: split trail
- Elevation: -5° to +33°
- Traverse: 15° right, 15° left
- Rate of fire: 6-8 rounds/minute
- Muzzle velocity: 620 m/s (2,034 ft/s)
- Maximum firing range: 13,265 metres (14,507 yd)
- Sights: Panoramic

The Type 14 10 cm cannon (十四式十糎加農砲, Jyūyon-shiki Kanōhō) was the first medium caliber cannon totally of Japanese design and the first with a split trail carriage. The Type 14 designation was given to this gun as it was accepted in the 14th year of Emperor Taishō's reign (1925). It was used by the Imperial Japanese Army but was not considered successful and was replaced by the Type 92 10 cm cannon.

== History and development ==
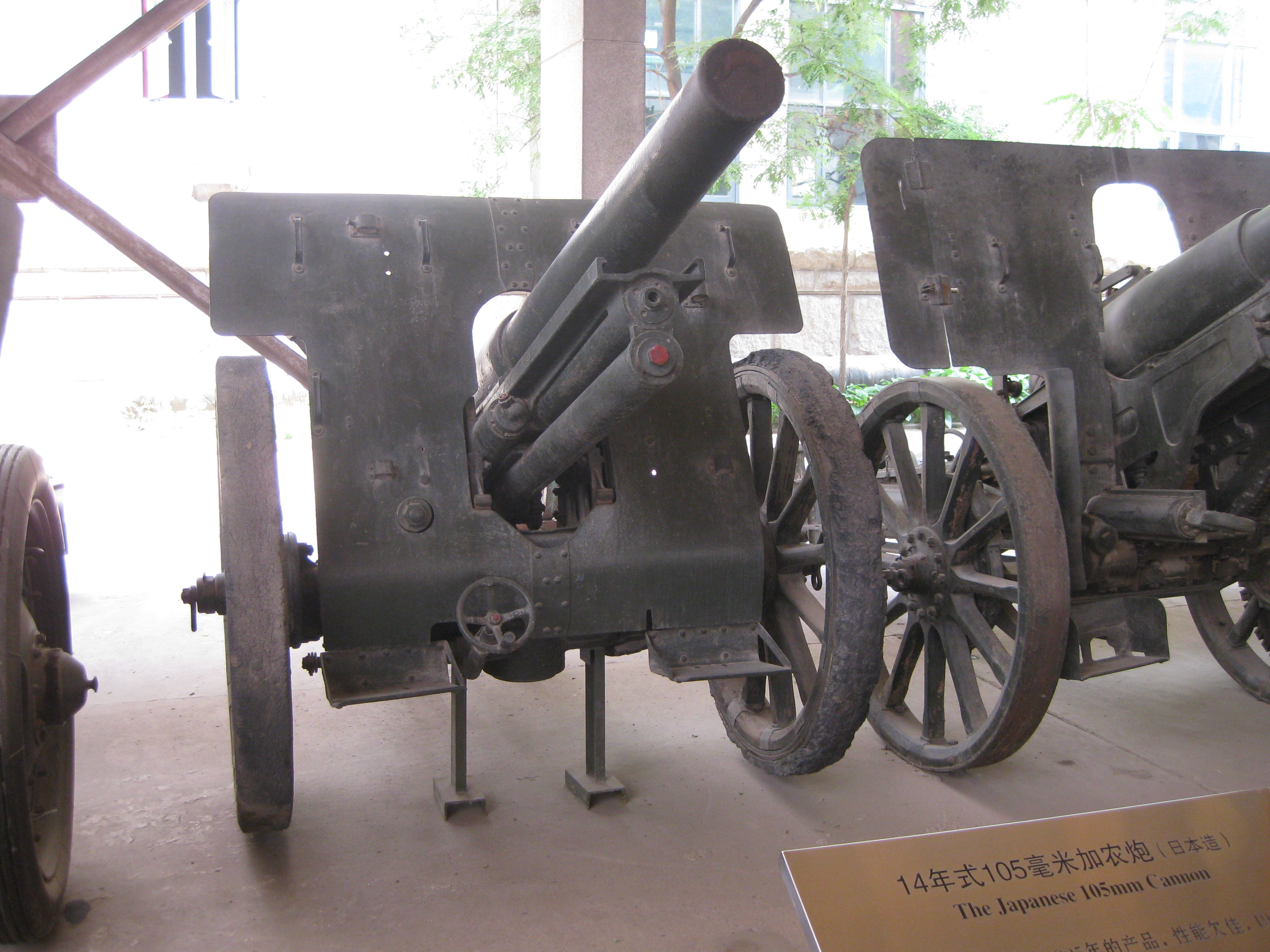
In the Military Museum of the Chinese People's Revolution, Beijing

Following reports based on first-hand observation of European artillery tactics in World War I by Japanese military observers, the Imperial Japanese Army General Staff instructed the Army Technical Bureau to begin work on new designs to modernize Japan's largely antiquated artillery. One priority was the development of a medium caliber artillery piece that would be able to provide greater firepower than the standard 75mm artillery currently in front line service. However, Japan lacked much of the technical expertise or industrial infrastructure to develop such as weapon, and initial prototypes issued as the "Type 7 10cm cannon" and the "Type 12 10cm cannon" were rejected as unsatisfactory.

However, with the incorporation of advancement in design taken from contemporary Schneider designs, the Type 14 10 cm cannon was finally accepted into service in 1925. However, due to technical and budgetary issues, only a total of 60 units were produced.

== Design ==
The Type 14 10 cm cannon was similar in design to the earlier Type 38 10 cm cannon, which was in turn based on a 1905 Krupp design, but is notable in that it was the first design done independently in Japan. It had an interrupted screw breechblock, a hydro-pneumatic recoil mechanism, heavy wooden wheels, and a split trail.

Ammunition was semifixed, with high-explosive, armor-piercing, shrapnel, and gas shells, and time fuzes for smoke and incendiary projectiles.

It was designed to be transportable by a team of eight draft horses. However, in 1931, a tractor was designed for use with the Type 14, with a 50-horsepower diesel engine, which greatly increased its transportability, albeit at a top speed of eight miles per hour.

== Combat record ==
The Type 14 10 cm cannon proved disappointing in terms of range and accuracy, and was not regarded as a successful design. The completed cannons were assigned to reserve and training units in the Japanese home islands, and were not deployed overseas in World War II.

== Gallery ==
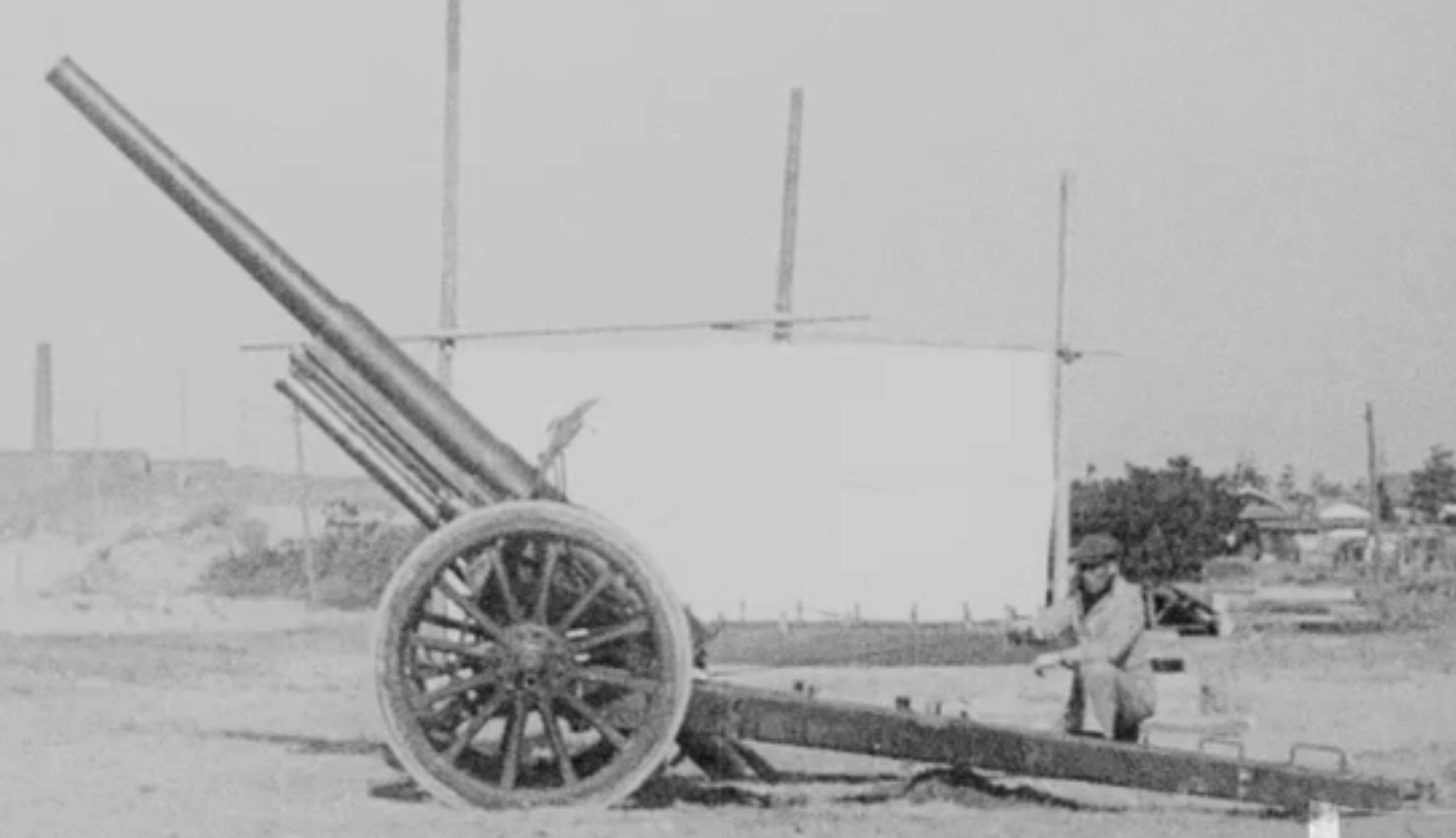
A prototype of the Type 14 10 cm cannon during firing tests in 1923

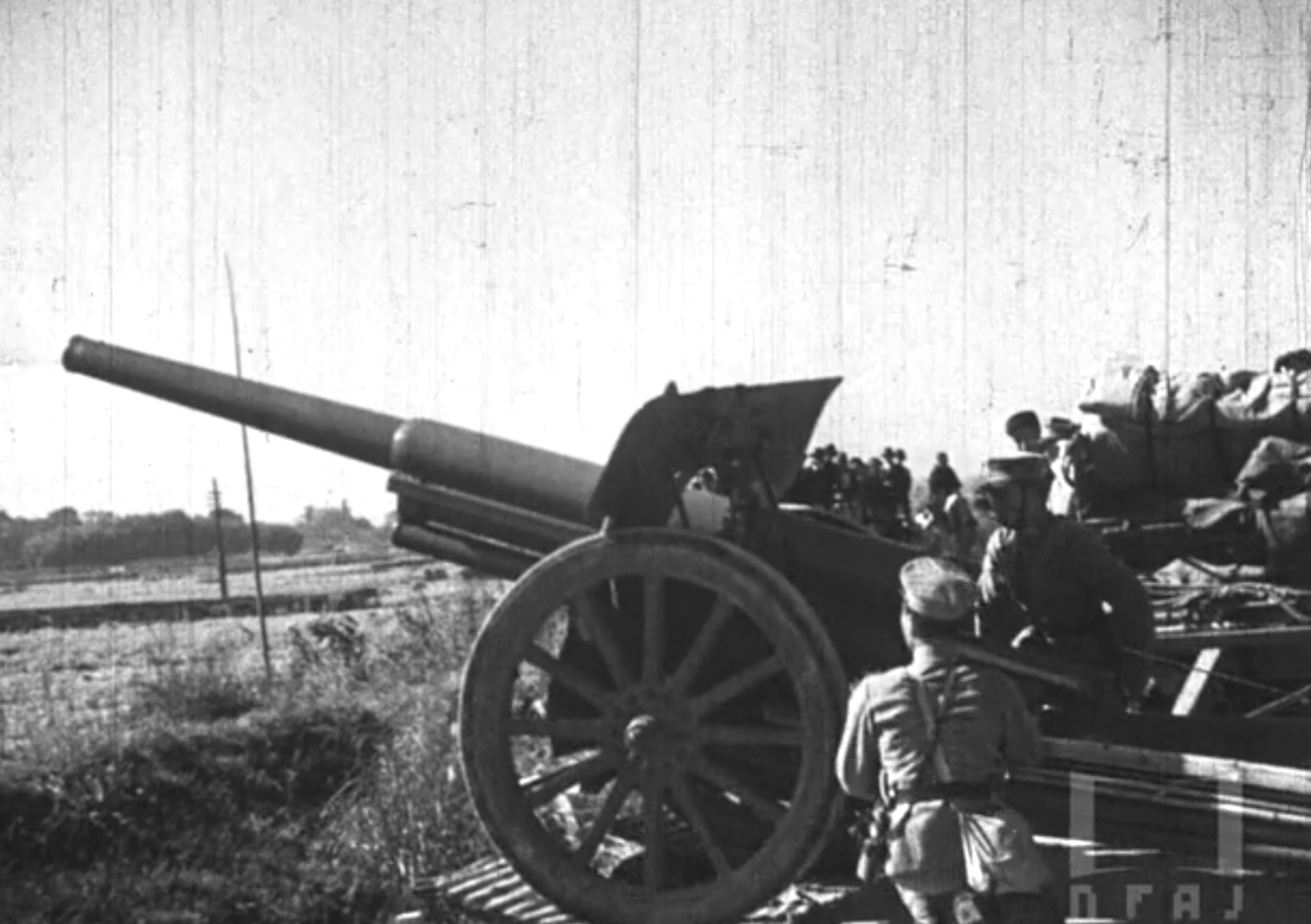
A Type 14 10 cm cannon 1932

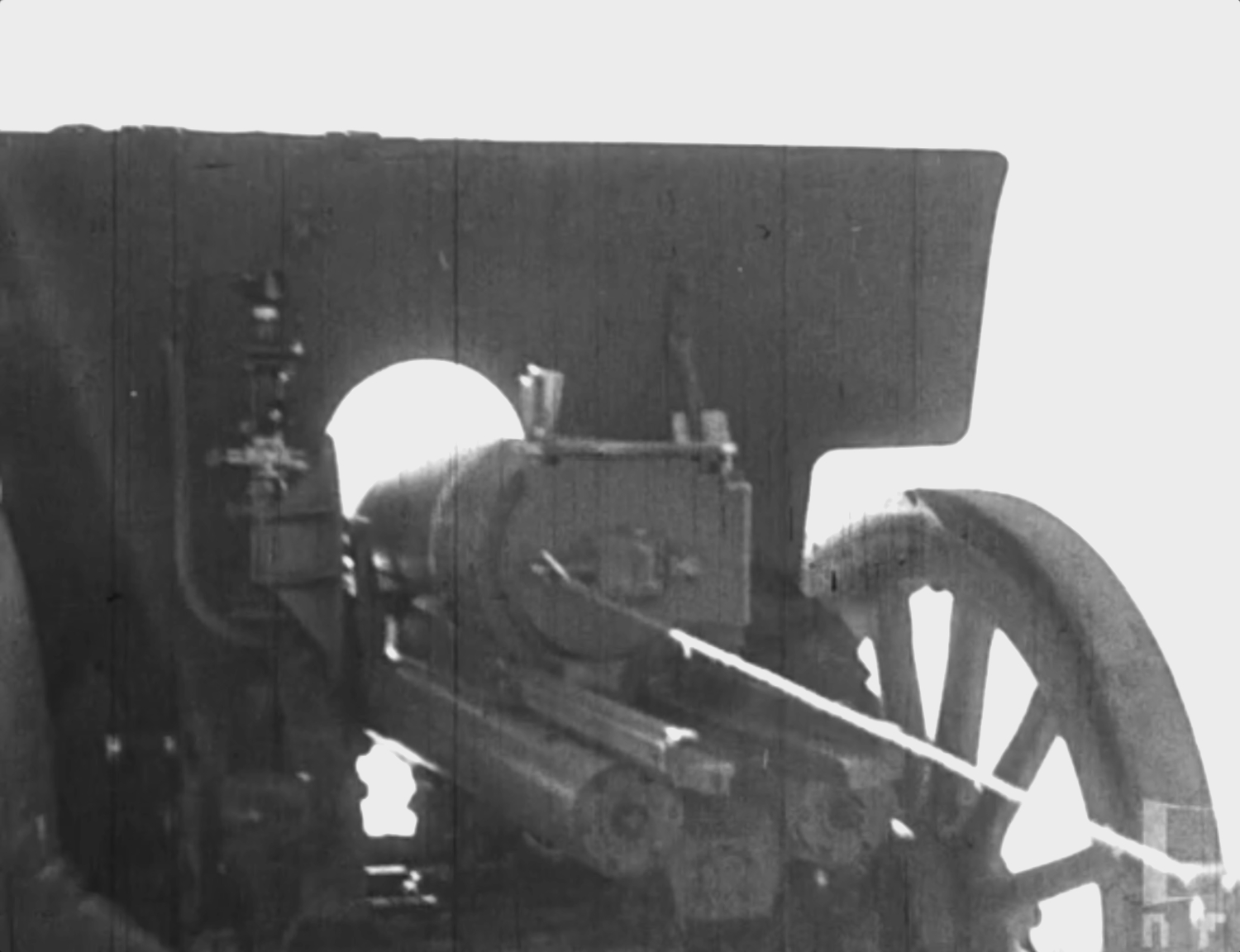
Detained rear view of a Type 14 10 cm cannon in 1932
