= Type 31 75 mm mountain gun =

Type 31 75 mm quick-firing gun
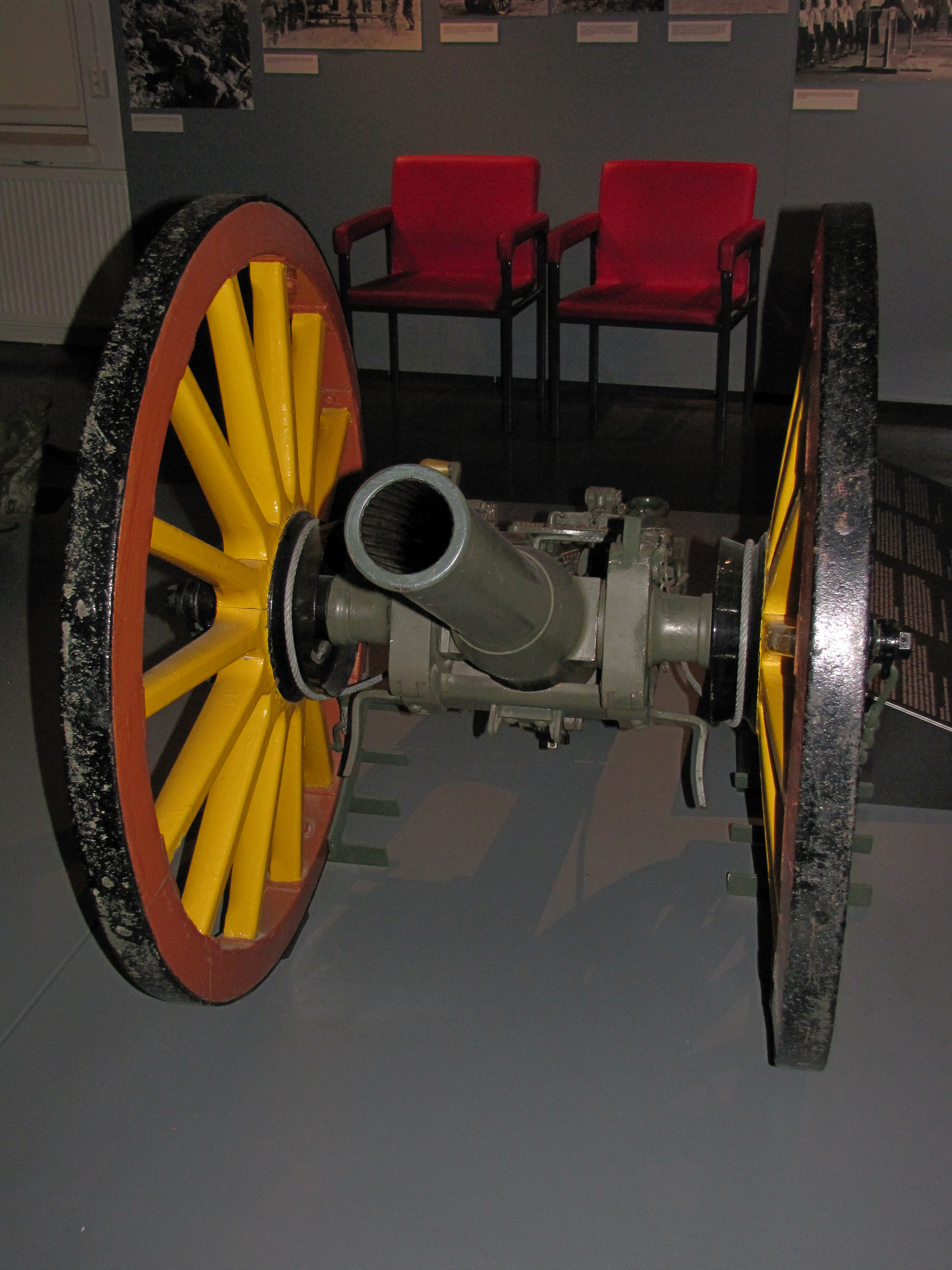
- Type 31 75 mm quick-firing at the Hämeenlinna military museum
- Type: Field gun mountain gun
- Place of origin: Empire of Japan

Service history
- Used by: Imperial Japanese Army; Russian Empire; Finland; Spain
- Wars: Russo Japanese War; World War I Spanish Civil War; World War II

Production history
- Designer: Arisaka Nariakira
- Produced: 1898
- No. built: Approximately 620 (Field Gun variant)

Specifications
- Mass: .330 tonnes (730 lb)
- Barrel length: 1.06 m (3 ft 6 in) L/13.3
- Shell: 6 kilograms (13 lb)
- Caliber: 75 millimetres (3.0 in)
- Recoil: Semi-rigid cable/spring system
- Carriage: Pole trail
- Elevation: -5° to +38°
- Rate of fire: 2–3 rounds/minute
- Muzzle velocity: 487 m/s (1,600 ft/s)
- Maximum firing range: 6,500 m (7,100 yd)

The Type 31 75 mm quick-firing gun (三十一年式速山砲, Sanjūichinen-shiki Sokusanhō) was the main field gun deployed by the Imperial Japanese Army in the Russo-Japanese War of 1904–1905. Like its predecessor the 7 cm gun, both mountain and field gun variants were produced.

== Description ==
The Type 31 was introduced in 1898, with the "Type 31" designation indicating that the gun was developed in 31st year of reign of Emperor Meiji. Designed by Colonel Arisaka Nariakira, it had a barrel made of steel, which improved the range and accuracy of the gun over the earlier 7 cm mountain gun, which had a bronze barrel. The Type 31 used smokeless powder cartridge shots, and had a semi-rigid recoil system using cables connected to a set of springs. It had a range of approximately 7,800 meters, using a 6 kilogram explosive shot. The Type 31 also came in a lighter mountain gun version, which had a shorter range (4,300 meters). Approximately 620 of the field gun models were produced and deployed to combat units by 1902, while production numbers for the mountain gun model are unknown.

The gun remained in service to the end of World War II where it was held in reserve. The Type 31 was only encountered by US troops during the post-surrender occupation of Korea.

== Foreign users ==
About one hundred Type 31 guns were sold to the Russian Empire in 1916. About 50 of these later surfaced in the Red Army during Finnish Civil War, and ultimately 44 guns were appropriated by Finland when the hostilities ceased. These guns were designated 75 VK 98. Forty-two of these guns, together with 28,000 shells, were sold again in 1937 to republican Spain in the ongoing Spanish Civil War. The chartered Estonian transport Yorbrook, carrying guns and ammunition, was intercepted in the Bay of Biscay by the Spanish cruiser Canarias shortly before the Battle of Cape Machichaco on 5 March 1937. During the battle, the Yorbrook was escorted by republican forces to enter the port of Bermeo, but it is unknown if the guns were dumped at sea or offloaded in Bermeo.
