= Type 41 75 mm cavalry gun =

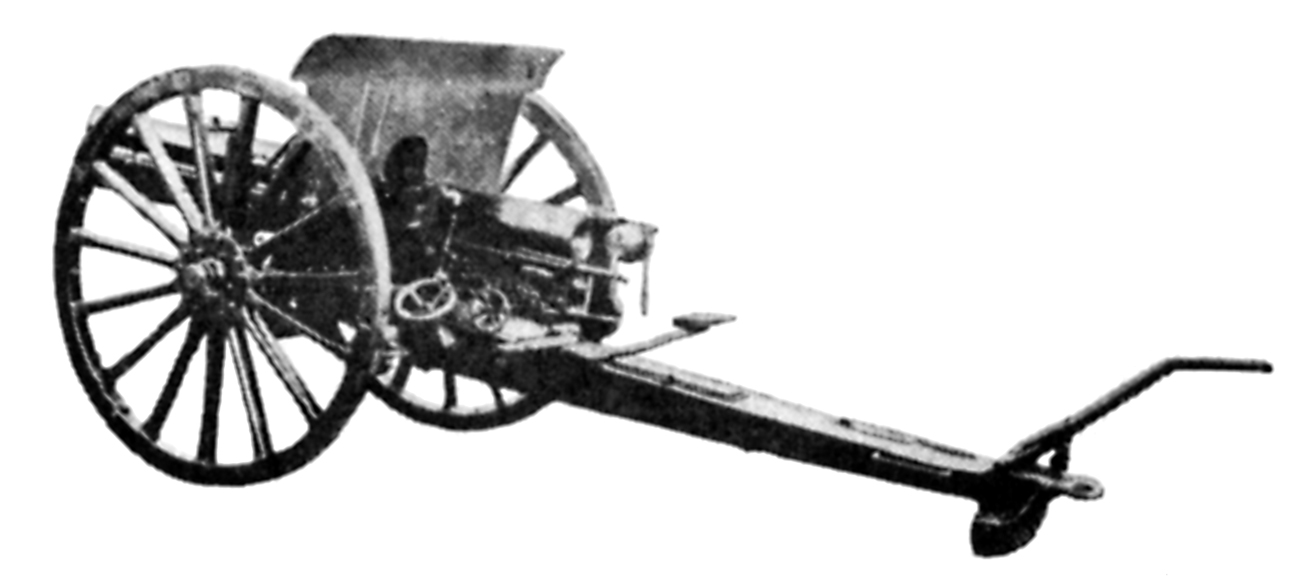
- Rear view of a Type 41 cavalry gun
- Type: Light field gun
- Place of origin: Empire of Japan

Service history
- In service: 1908–1945
- Used by: Imperial Japanese Army
- Wars: World War I, 2nd Sino-Japanese War, World War II

Specifications
- Mass: 915.76 kg (2,019 lb) firing 1,499.58 kg (3,306 lb) traveling
- Length: 4.39 m (14 ft 5 in) firing 8.05 m (26 ft 5 in) traveling
- Barrel length: 2.174 metres (7 ft 2 in) L/29.27
- Width: 1.37 m (4 ft 6 in) track, 1.57 m (5 ft 2 in) maximum
- Height: 1.57 m (5 ft 2 in)
- Shell: 75 x 185 mm R
- Shell weight: 6.025 kilograms (13.28 lb)
- Caliber: 75 mm (2.95 in)
- Breech: Interrupted screw
- Recoil: Hydrospring
- Carriage: Fixed box trail
- Elevation: -8° to +16° 30'
- Traverse: 6° right 6° left
- Rate of fire: 8 rpm
- Muzzle velocity: 510 m/s (1,673 ft/s)
- Maximum firing range: 8,380 metres (9,160 yd)

The Type 41 75 mm cavalry gun was a Japanese field gun first accepted into service in 1908. The Type 41 designation was given to this gun as it was accepted in the 41st year of Emperor Meiji's reign (1908). It was a slightly lightened version of the Type 38 75 mm field gun that was based on a 1905 Krupp design. It was the primary weapon of artillery units attached to cavalry formations. Although effectively obsolete by the start of World War II, it was used in limited numbers despite nominally being replaced by the Type 95 75 mm field gun.

== Design ==
This Schneider type gun was especially constructed to give artillery support to cavalry regiments. Its design is almost identical with that of the original Model 38 75 mm gun. It is somewhat lighter than the Model 38 improved 75 mm gun, the corresponding direct-support artillery in the infantry division. In 1944, Japanese cavalry brigades had not yet been in combat against U. S. forces, it was not certain whether this old-fashioned gun with unmodified box trails and hydrospring recoil remained in general use or if it had been superseded by a more modern weapon. It can readily be differentiated from the Model 38 75 mm gun by its interrupted thread breechblock.

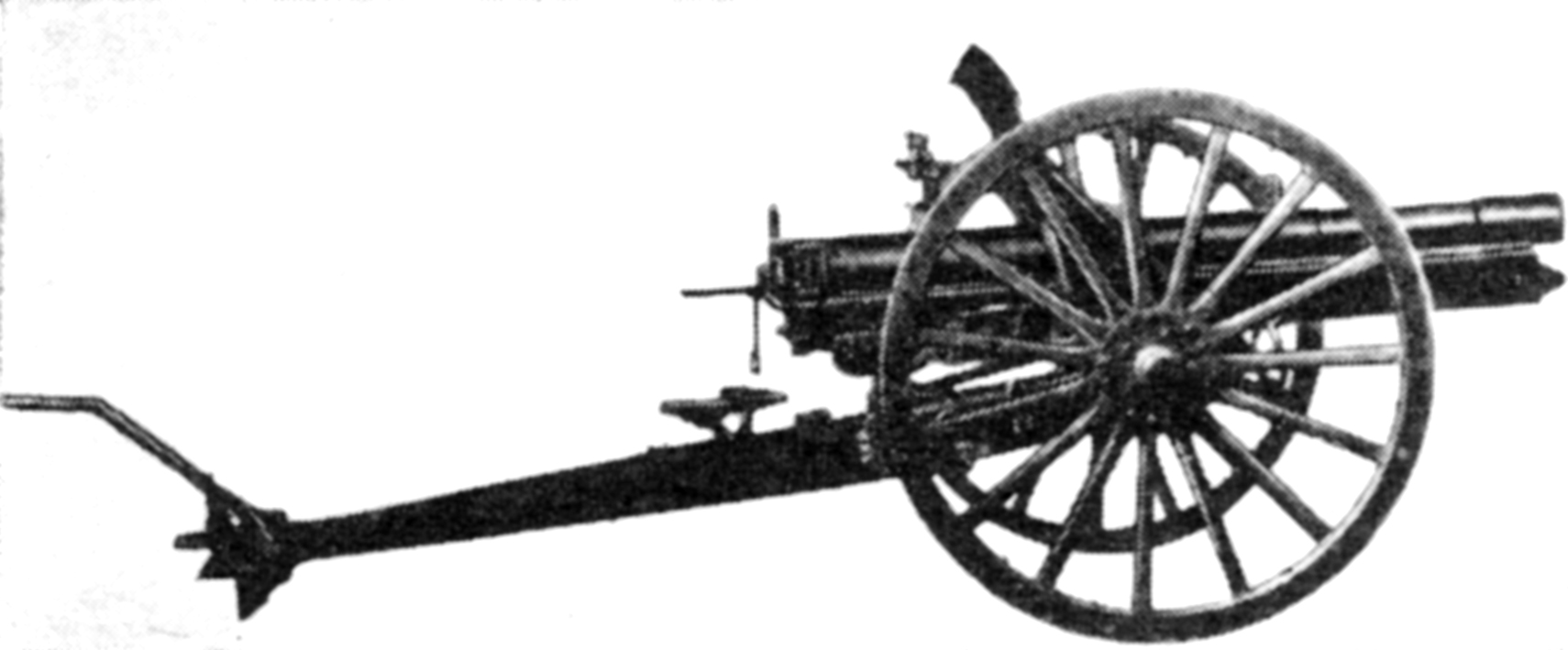
A Type 41 cavalry gun seen from the side

== See also ==
- Type 41 75 mm mountain gun
