= List of IJA Independent Infantry Brigades =

The Japanese Imperial Army had Independent Infantry Brigades, which were formed as garrison units mostly in China late in World War II.

List of Japanese Imperial Army Independent Infantry Brigades

- 1st Independent Infantry Brigade
- 2nd Independent Infantry Brigade
- 3rd Independent Infantry Brigade
- 4th Independent Infantry Brigade
- 5th Independent Infantry Brigade
- 6th Independent Infantry Brigade
- 7th Independent Infantry Brigade
- 8th Independent Infantry Brigade
- 9th Independent Infantry Brigade
- 10th Independent Infantry Brigade
- 11th Independent Infantry Brigade
- 13th Independent Infantry Brigade
- 14th Independent Infantry Brigade

== Sources ==
- 抗日战争时期的侵华日军序列沿革 (Order of battle of the Japanese army that invaded China during the Sino Japanese War)
