= Type 95 75 mm field gun =

Field gun used by the Imperial Japanese Army

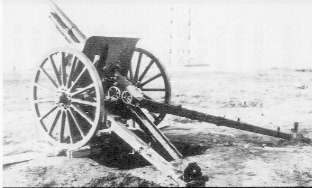
- Type 95 75 mm field gun
- Type: Field gun
- Place of origin: Empire of Japan

Service history
- In service: 1936–1945
- Used by: Imperial Japanese Army
- Wars: World War II

Production history
- Designer: Osaka Arsenal
- Manufacturer: Osaka Arsenal
- Unit cost: 18,700 yen ($5,025 USD) in August 1939
- Produced: 1936, forward
- No. built: 261

Specifications
- Mass: 1,106.6 kilograms (2,440 lb) Firing; 1,929 kg (4,253 lb) Traveling
- Length: 4.47 m (14 ft 8 in) Firing; 8.86 m (29 ft 1 in)Traveling
- Barrel length: 2.278 metres (7 ft 6 in) L/30.67
- Width: 1.5 m (4 ft 11 in) Track; 1.78 m (5 ft 10 in) Maximum
- Height: 1.60 m (5 ft 3 in)
- Shell: 6.33 kilograms (14.0 lb)
- Caliber: 75 mm (2.95 in)
- Action: manual
- Breech: Horizontal sliding-wedge
- Recoil: Hydro-pneumatic, constant
- Carriage: Split-trail, demountable spade plates, fixed trail blocks
- Elevation: -8° to +43°
- Traverse: 25° right, 25° left
- Rate of fire: 10-12 rpm
- Muzzle velocity: 500 m/s (1,640 ft/s)
- Maximum firing range: 10,970 meters (12,000 yd)
- Feed system: manual
- Sights: Panoramic

The Type 95 75 mm field gun (九五式野砲, Kyūgo-shiki yahō) was a field gun used by the Imperial Japanese Army during World War II. It was intended to replace the Type 38 75 mm field gun and the Type 41 75 mm cavalry gun in front line combat units but, due to operational and budgetary constraints, only a small number were produced, and the Type 38 and Type 41 continued to be used. The Type 95 number was designated for the year the gun was accepted, 2595 in the Japanese imperial year calendar, or 1935 in the Gregorian calendar.

== History and development ==
Prior to World War I, the Imperial Japanese Army was largely equipped with Krupp cannons from Germany. After the Versailles Treaty, the Japanese Army switched to the French Schneider company, and developed the Type 90 75 mm field gun loosely based on the Schneider et Cie Canon de 85 mle 1927. However, the Schneider design was very complex and expensive to build, requiring very tight dimensional tolerances which were beyond the limits of Japanese industry to sustain at the time. Maintenance was also difficult to sustain in front line combat service. The Army Technical Bureau, following combat experience gained in the invasion of Manchuria and the Soviet-Japanese Border Wars reverted to a simpler and more rugged design for the Type 95 field gun, which entered production in 1935. The Type 95 75 mm gun has an appearance similar to the Model 90 75 mm gun. It is derived from the Model 1933 Schneider 75, which it closely resembles. Only a total of 261 units were produced, and the Type 38 75 mm field gun and the Type 41 75 mm cavalry gun continued to be used by front line combat units until the surrender of Japan.

== Design ==
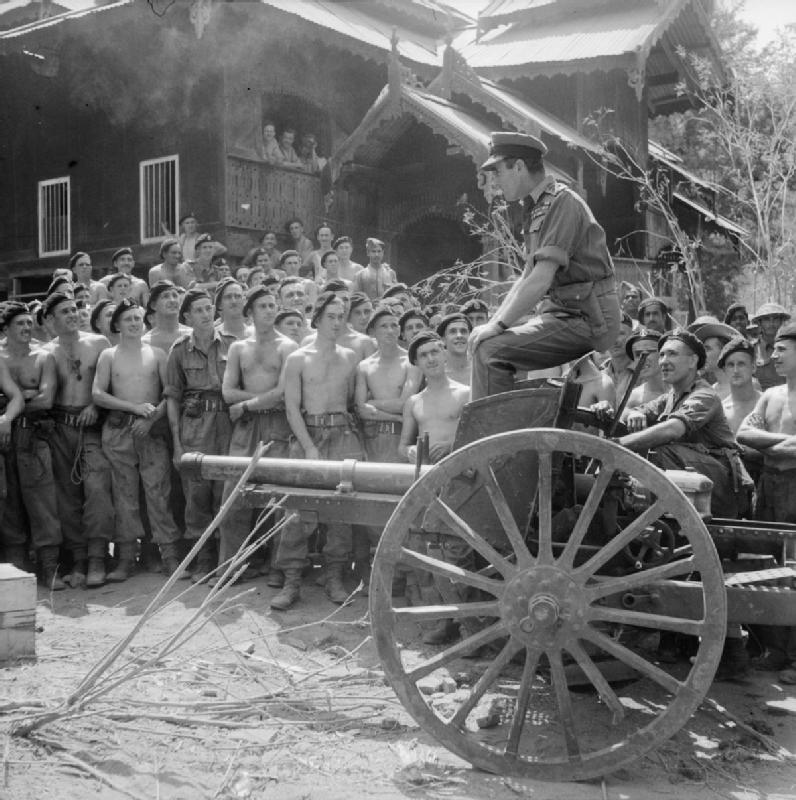
Admiral Lord Louis Mountbatten, Supreme Allied Commander South East Asia, sits astride a captured Japanese 75 mm gun while addressing men of the Royal Armoured Corps in Mandalay, 21 March 1945

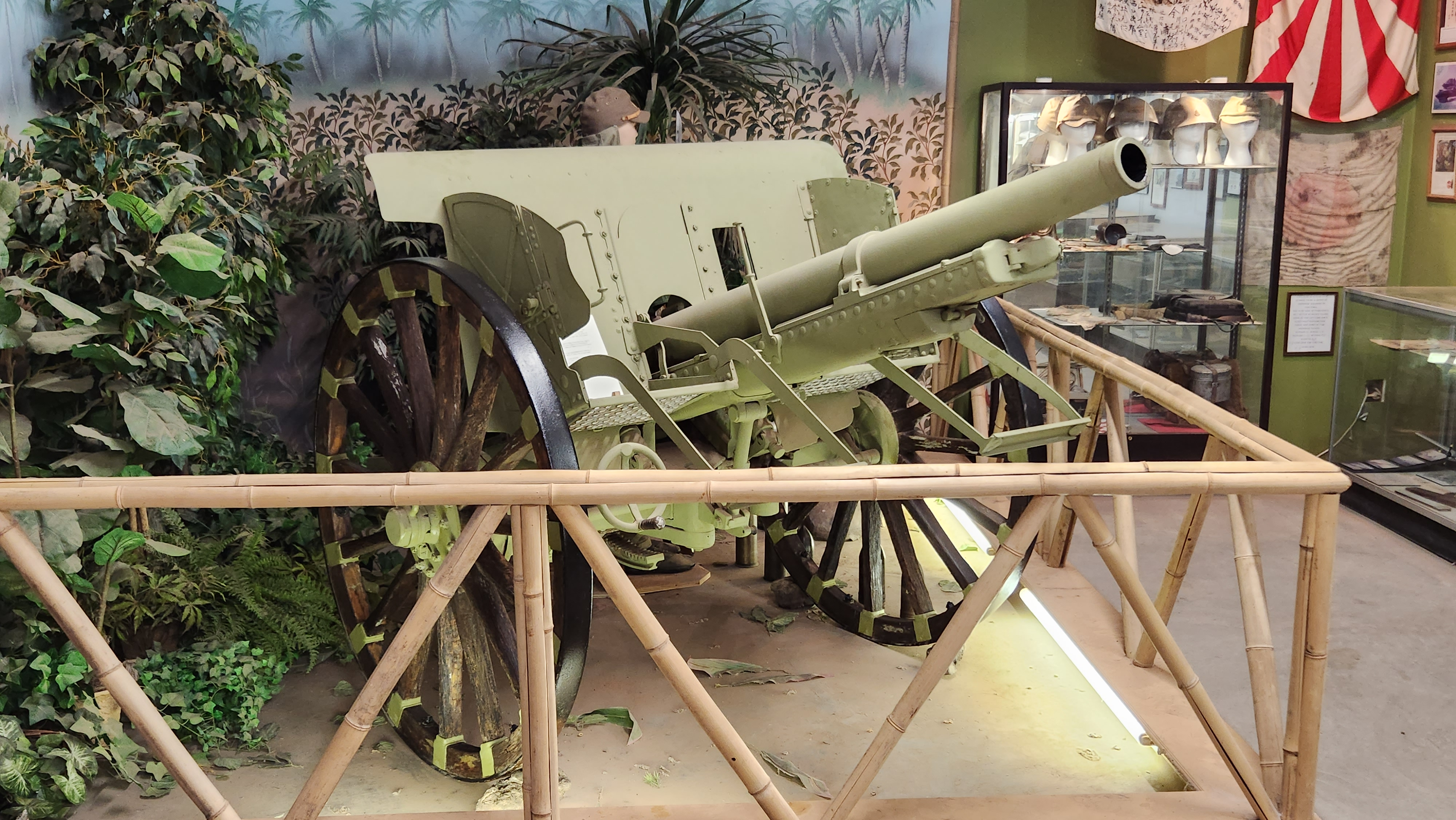
Japanese Type 95 Field Gun on display at the Texas Air Museum in Slaton, Texas.

Although occasionally mentioned as a copy of the French Schneider et Cie Canon de 75 Mle 1933, this connection is dubious. The Type 95 essentially utilized the Model 38 (improved) weapon with sliding-wedge type breechblock and hydro-pneumatic recoil mechanism on the split trail carriage used on the Type 90. This hybrid design addressed the issue of the heavy weight of the Type 90, which had created problems with field commanders, as well as the need for a simpler, more rugged design that could be transported by a team of six horses. As with the Type 90, the Type 95 was built in two versions: one with wooden wheels suitable for animal draft, and another with solid rubber tires and a stronger suspension for towing by motor vehicles.

Since it weighs only 400 pounds more than the Model 41 cavalry gun, it is possible that the Model 95 may have been intended to replace that weapon. However, its use on Saipan and its close resemblance to the heavier Model 90 may indicate that the latter weapon was too heavy for efficient horse-draft, and too complex for the capabilities of Japanese industry. Though the Model 95 was split-trailed, it actually weighed less than the improved Model 38 75 mm gun. The Model 95 was much lighter than its Schneider prototype, and had a sliding-wedge rather than an interrupted thread breechblock. It incorporated all features of modern Japanese design.

== Combat record ==
The appearance of the Type 95 75 mm field gun caused considerable confusion with both Allied military intelligence and with Japanese troops. The Type 95 was inferior in technology and performance to its predecessor, with less range and lower muzzle velocity. Although cheaper to build and to maintain, and less in weight, it was not well received by field commanders. It was primarily assigned to units in China.
