= Type 92 10 cm cannon =

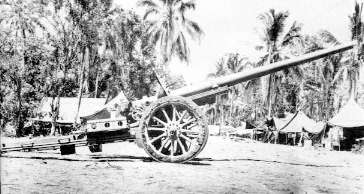
- Type 92 10 cm cannon
- Type: Field gun
- Place of origin: Empire of Japan

Service history
- In service: 1932–1945
- Used by: Imperial Japanese Army
- Wars: Second Sino-Japanese War; Soviet-Japanese Border Wars; World War II

Production history
- Designer: Schneider, Osaka Arsenal
- Manufacturer: Osaka Arsenal
- Unit cost: 37,250 yen ($10,009 USD) in August 1939
- Produced: 1933–1943
- No. built: 180 to 202

Specifications
- Mass: 3,732.3 kilograms (8,228 lb) Firing; 4,364 kg (9,621 lb) Traveling
- Length: 7.92 m (26 ft 0 in) Firing; 9.78 m (32 ft 1 in) Traveling
- Barrel length: 4.681 metres (15 ft 4 in) L/45
- Width: 1.5 m (4 ft 11 in) Track; 1.88 m (6 ft 2 in) Maximum
- Height: 1.8 m (5 ft 11 in)
- Shell: 105 x 737mm R
- Shell weight: 15.77 kilograms (34 lb 12 oz)
- Caliber: 105 mm (4.13 in)
- Recoil: Hydro-pneumatic
- Carriage: Split trail
- Elevation: -5° to +45°
- Traverse: 36°
- Rate of fire: 6–8 rpm
- Muzzle velocity: 760 m/s (2,493 ft/s)
- Maximum firing range: 18,300 metres (20,000 yd)
- Sights: panoramic

The Type 92 10 cm cannon (九二式十糎加農砲, Kyūni-shiki Jyū-senchi Kannohō) (105 mm) was a field gun used by the Imperial Japanese Army during the Second Sino-Japanese War and World War II. The Type 92 number was designated for the year the gun was accepted, 2592 in the Japanese imperial year calendar, or 1932 in the Gregorian calendar. The Type 92 cannon was intended to supersede the Type 14 10 cm cannon in front-line combat service. Like the Type 90 7.5 cm field gun and the Type 96 15 cm howitzer, the French company Schneider aided with the design. The Type 92 10cm cannon proved to be a modern and capable design, with its faults including a lack of provision for high-speed towing and weakness in the sealing of the recoil system in the early models.

== History and development ==
The Type 92 10 cm cannon was developed from 1923–1924, as a long-range alternative to the Imperial Japanese Army's existing 75 mm field artillery. Production was delayed due to technical issues, notably a desire by the army to reduce the weight of the weapon to a minimal level, and additional requirements issued by the army in 1927 to increase the range of the yet-to-be-completed weapon to 17,500 metres (19,100 yd). The French defense company Schneider aided with the design based on 1927 contracts with the Imperial Japanese Army. A suitable prototype was finally completed in 1932, and, after extensive testing, went into production and combat service in 1934. A total of between 180 and 202 units were produced.

The Type 92 10 cm cannon appears to have almost completely replaced the Type 14 10 cm cannon. It has all the standard features of the 1930–1936 period of Japanese gun design. In traveling position the tube is retracted by means of a winch and locked to the cradle. The most remarkable fact about the Type 92, aside from its appearance, is the great range that it attains with a 35-pound shell in proportion to its unusually low weight. It has been reported in US documentation that the weapon was rarely fired at extreme ranges, which required the use of a supercharge, because of malfunctions in the recoil system caused thereby. Weaknesses in the sealing of the recoil system were largely fixed during the period of 1939 to 1940.

The Type 92 10 cm cannon also had problems with weak trails when the cannon was fired near the limits of its traverse, leading to a number of broken trails during the Battle of Nomonhan. Broken trails were also reported in 1942 during the Battle of Guadalcanal. Late production models fixed this problem.

== Design ==
Readily recognized by its long slender gun barrel and split carriage trail, the Type 92 10 cm cannon was designed particularly for long-range fire. The recoil system was hydro-pneumatic and it had a distinctive three-step interrupted thread breechblock. It fired a 35 pounds (16 kg) shell up to 14,200 yards (13,000 m) with standard high-explosive shells, and also had provisions for special long-range shells that could reach 20,000 yards (18,000 m), as well as chemical, armor-piercing, smoke and incendiary shells.

The gun barrel was extremely long, making field transport very cumbersome. The gun was normally tractor-drawn using its large wooden wheels with solid rubber tires, but could also be pulled by a five-ton truck. Its greatest drawback was that it had spade plates on each trail leg that had to be pounded into the ground to anchor the gun in place.

The most common projectile was the Type 91 HE round, which was also used in other Japanese 105 mm weapons. The ammunition was propelled by that provided flexibility in trajectories.

== Combat record ==
Despite design issues with transportability, the Type 92 10 cm cannon was very successful and was used for long-range counter-battery and bombardment roles. It was first used in combat with the IJA 7th Independent Heavy Field Artillery Regiment at the Battle of Nomonhan against the Soviet Red Army. It later was used in the Battle of the Philippines in 1942 during the assaults on Bataan and Corregidor Island, and it was transported to Guadalcanal and used in the bombardment of Henderson Field.

== Surviving examples ==
There are multiple known surviving examples.

A surviving gun is displayed in front of the Veterans Hall in Arcata, California. It has the serial number 136 and was made at the Osaka Infantry Armory in 1941.

A surviving gun is located in front of VFW Post 4911 in Floyd county, Georgia. It has the serial number 33 and was made in Osaka, Japan. This gun, which is known as "Pistol Pete," was captured at Guadalcanal in December 1942.

A surviving gun is located at The Istana, Singapore. It was presented to the leader of the returning victorious British forces to Singapore, Lord Louis Mountbatten, following the official Japanese surrender to the British in 1945 at the end of WWII.

A surviving gun is located outside of American Legion Post 926 in Aston, Pennsylvania.

A surviving gun is located at the Blackdown Cadet Training Centre located in CFB Borden, Ontario.

A surviving gun is located at Camp Bowie Memorial Park in Brownwood, Texas.

== Photo Gallery ==
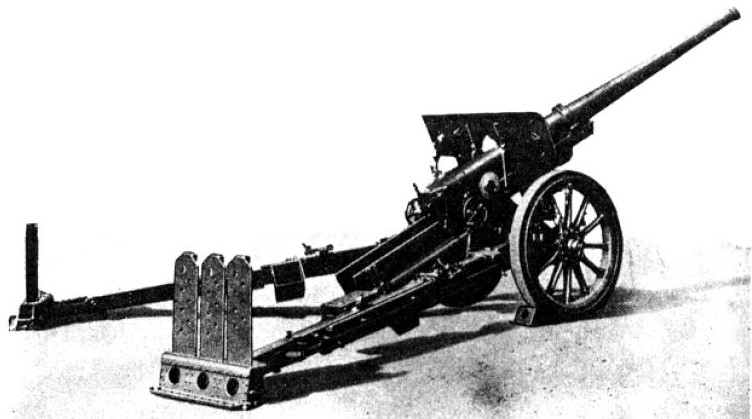
Type 92 carriage.

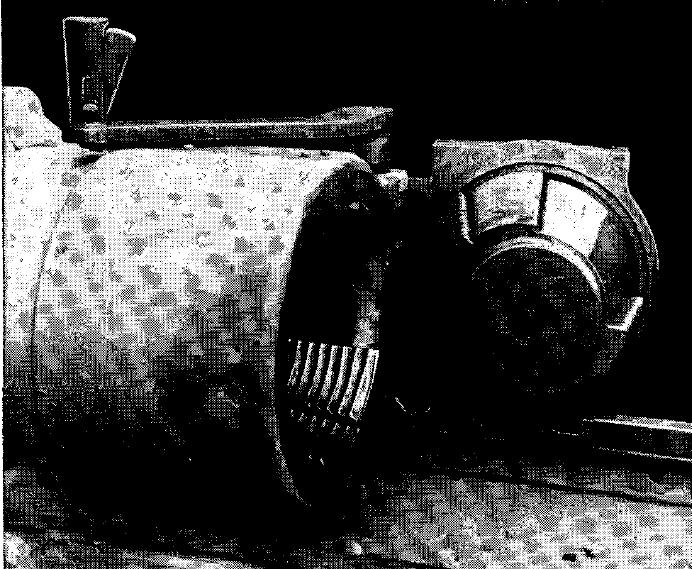
Type 92 breech.

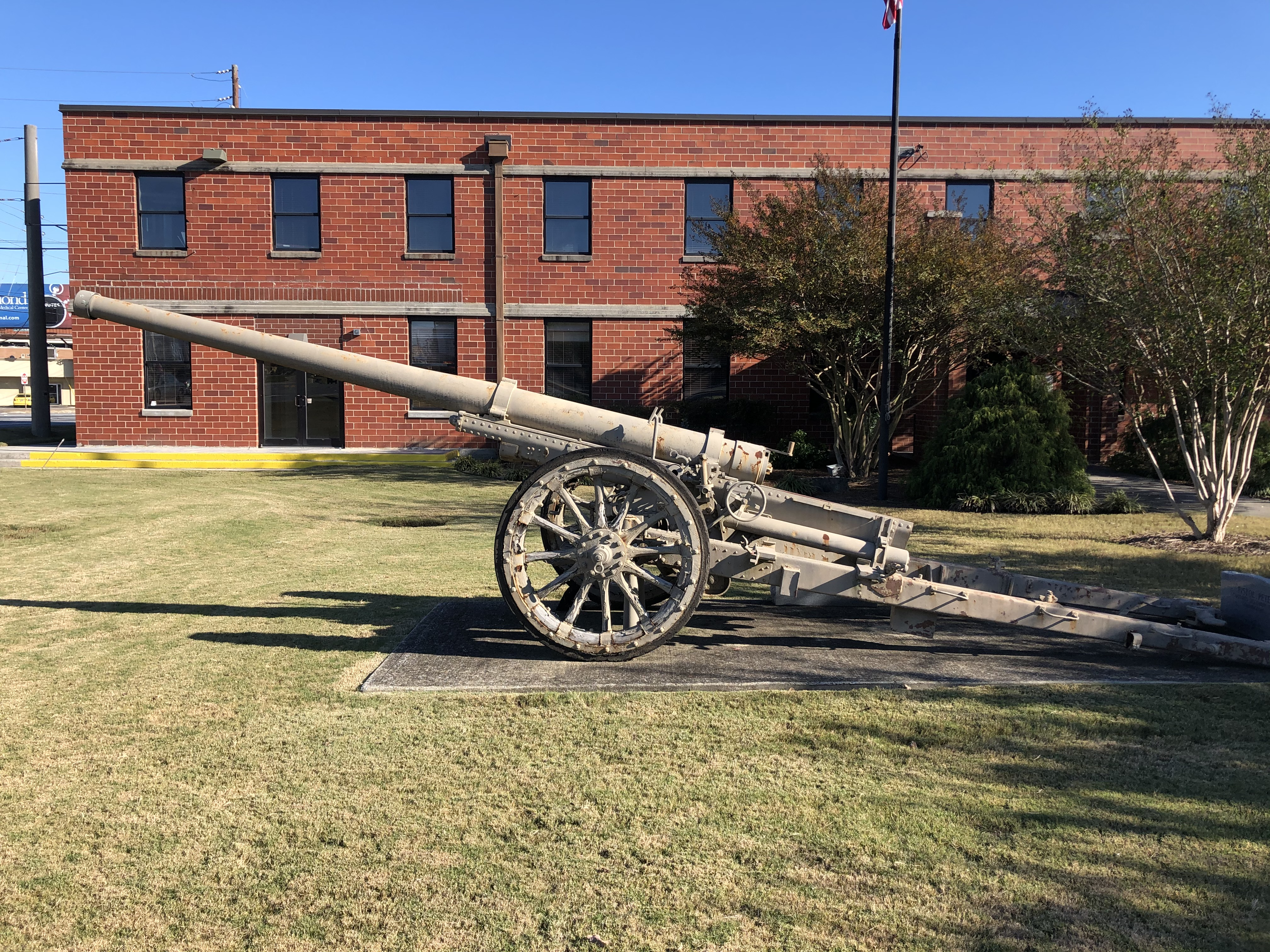
Type 92 at its former location in Rome, Georgia.

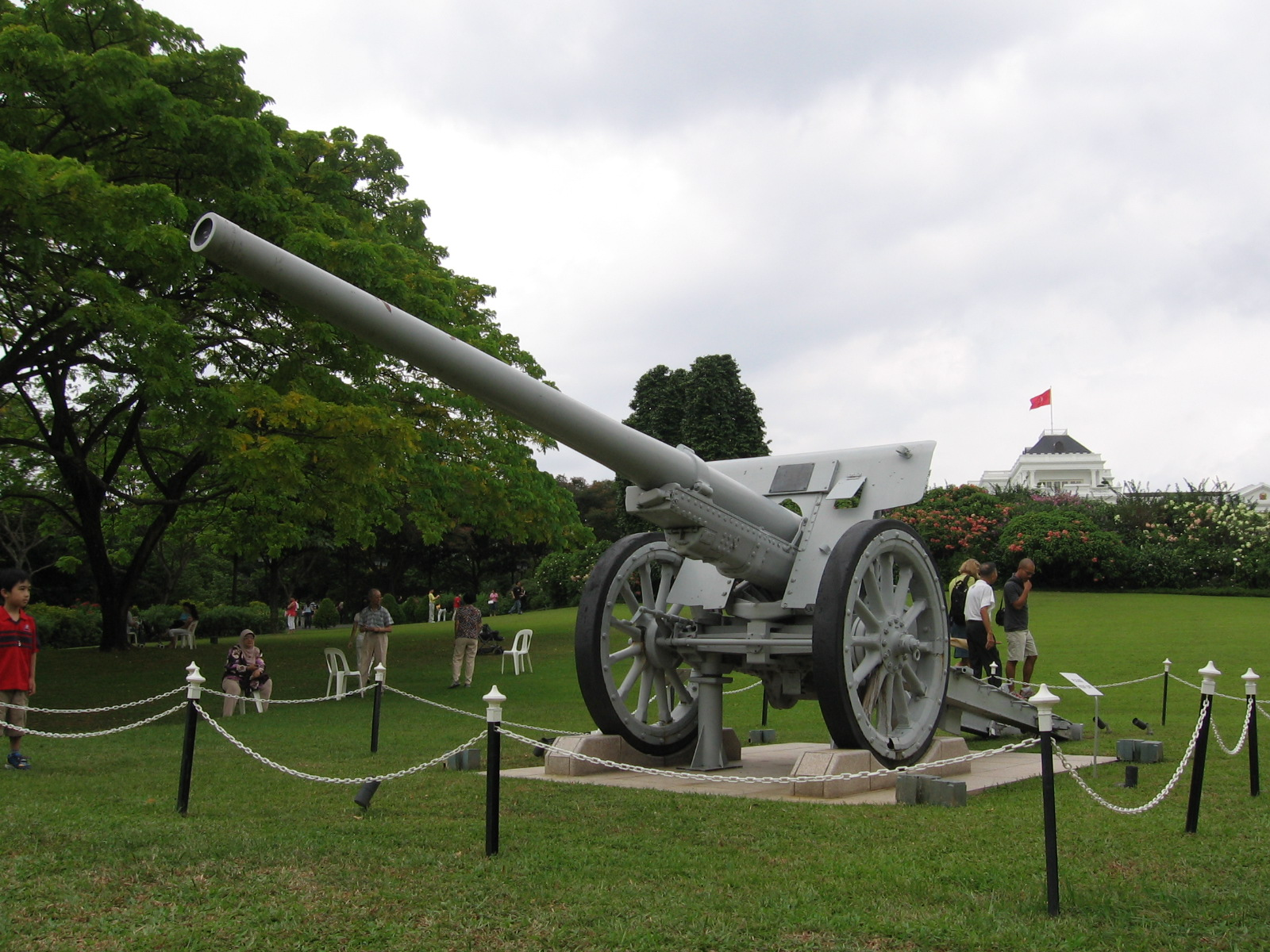
Type 92 located on The Istana grounds, Singapore.
