= Type 45 15 cm cannon =

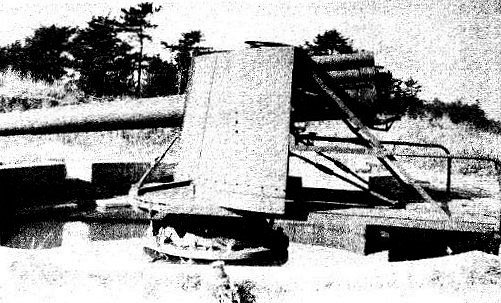
- A Type 45 in a sunken concrete gun emplacement.
- Type: Coastal defense gun Field artillery
- Place of origin: Empire of Japan

Service history
- In service: 1912–1945
- Used by: Imperial Japanese Army
- Wars: World War II

Production history
- Designed: 1912
- Unit cost: 165,000 yen ($44,336 USD) in August 1939
- No. built: 80

Specifications
- Mass: 22.9 t (22.5 long tons; 25.2 short tons)
- Barrel length: 7.5 m (24 ft 7 in) L/50
- Shell: Separate loading cased charge and projectile
- Shell weight: 41 kg (90 lb)
- Caliber: 149.1 mm (5.87 in)
- Breech: Interrupted screw
- Recoil: Hydro-spring
- Carriage: Center pivot
- Elevation: 1912: +8° to +30° 1934: +8° to +43°
- Traverse: 360°
- Muzzle velocity: 860 m/s (2,800 ft/s)
- Maximum firing range: 22.5 km (14 mi)

The Type 45 15 cm cannon (四五式十五糎加農砲) was a coastal defense gun and heavy artillery used by the Imperial Japanese Army during World War II. The designation Type 45 indicates the year of its introduction, the 45th year of the Meiji period or 1912 according to the Gregorian calendar.

== Design ==
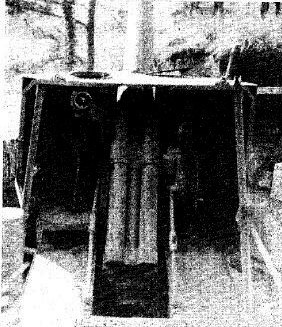
A rear view of the Type 45 showing its hydro-spring recoil system.

The Type 45 was a built-up gun made from steel with an interrupted-screw breech which fired separate loading cased charges and projectiles. The barrel was trunnioned near its center, with a gun shield to protect the gun crew and a hydro-spring recoil system above the barrel. Although classified as a heavy field artillery piece and coastal defense gun by the Imperial Japanese Army, in reality, it was only used as a coastal defense gun because no gun carriage was provided for transport. In order to emplace the gun, a pit needed to be excavated and a concrete apron laid to support the mount. As originally built the Type 45 was intended for a direct fire role with a maximum elevation of +30° and was probably capable of firing a projectile farther than what its optical fire direction equipment could accurately target. A modification program in 1934 increased its maximum elevation to +43° which increased its range and gave it an indirect fire capability.

== History ==
During the 1920s the Type 45 was augmented but never replaced by the Type 7 15 cm coast defense gun. Both the Type 45 and Type 7 used the same projectiles. At that same time large numbers of naval guns were declared surplus and placed in storage for use as coastal defense guns when the ships they armed were scrapped due to the Washington Naval Disarmament Treaties. This glut of suitable coastal defense guns meant that the Type 45 and Type 7 were only produced in limited numbers during the 1920s. Due to the type 45's weight, few numbers and limited mobility, it saw only limited use outside of the Japanese home islands and against land targets.
