= Handbook on Japanese Military Forces =

Military handbook of Japan

Later printing

War Department Technical Manual TM-E 30-480 Handbook On Japanese Military Forces dated 15 September 1944 was the US Army's guide to the Japanese armed forces for the use of troops in the field. The "E" stands for "enemy."

It was 8" × 10½", bound in two removable olive pasteboard covers to facilitate the addition and deletion of material. It was originally 401pp., with 412 illustrations including diagrams, photos, charts. color plates of uniforms & medals. It detailed most of the known information about the Imperial Japanese Military as of the publication date. It superseded the original TM E 30-480 dated 14 May 1941 and the second edition dated 21 September 1942. The handbook was classified "Restricted" (the lowest of the four wartime security classifications) to enable its dissemination to the widest possible audience.

Readers should take care when consulting TM-E 30-480 as there are many inaccuracies shown by post war research. It is a wartime publication subject to the limitations of wartime intelligence collection and dissemination.

TM-E 30-480 has been reprinted several times by several different publishers. The 1995 edition includes an Introduction by David Isby and an afterword by Jeffrey Ethell, Louisiana State University Press, Baton Rouge Louisiana 70803, ISBN 0-8071-2013-8, 403 pp., illus, in colour and b/w, maps, wraps. None of these editions is complete.

== Contents ==
CHAPTER I. RECRUITMENT AND TRAINING.

- Section I. General
- Section II. Conscription system
- Section III. Procurement of officers
- Section IV. Training
- Section V. Promotion, pay and awards
- Section VI. Morale, discipline, and efficiency

CHAPTER II. JAPANESE MILITARY SYSTEM.

- Section I. The Japanese High Command
- Section II. Territorial organizations, including depot divisions
- Section III. Field replacement system

CHAPTER III. FIELD ORGANIZATION.

- Section I. Major organizations
- Section II. Arms (nondivisional)
- Section III. Services (nondivisional)
- Section IV. Military Intelligence
- Section V. Reorganization

CHAPTER IV. JAPANESE AIR SERVICE.

- Section I. General
- Section II. Organization of the Japanese Army Air Service
- Section III. Strategic doctrine
- Section IV. Japanese air tactics
- Section V. Equipment

CHAPTER V. Special Forces.

- Section I. Naval land forces
- Section II. Task forces and special defense units

CHAPTER VI. JAPANESE MILITARY POLICE.

- Section I. Administration
- Section II. Recruiting
- Section III. Uniform and Equipment
- Section IV. Strength
- Section V. Units
- SectionVI. Distribution According to Areas
- SectionVII. Military Police Dutied in the Field
- SectionVIII. Morale and Value for War of the Military Police

CHAPTER VII. TACTICS OF THE JAPANESE ARMY.

- PART I. General tactical doctrine
  - Section I. General
  - Section II. Offensive
  - Section III. Defensive
  - Section IV. Retrograde movements
  - Section V. Employment of tanks and mechanized units
- PART II. Application of tactics
  - Section VI. Antiaircraft
  - Section VII. Antitank defense
  - Section VIII. Jungle warfare
  - Section IX. Small island defense
  - Section X. Coastal defense
  - Section XI. Japanese joint operations
  - Section XII. Japanese parachute troops

CHAPTER VIII. SUPPLY, MOVEMENTS, AND EVACUATION.

- Section I. Supply
- Section II. Movements
- Section III. Evacuation

CHAPTER IX. WEAPONS.

- Section I. Introduction
- Section II. Infantry weapons
- Section III. Artillery
- Section IV. Tanks and armored cars
- Section V. Chemical warfare

CHAPTER X. EQUIPMENT.

- Section I. Introduction
- Section II. Infantry equipment
- Section III. Artillery equipment
- Section IV. Signal equipment
- Section V. Engineer equipment
- Section VI. Cavalry and reconnaissance
- Section VII. Automotive and land transport equipment
- Section VIII. Tentage
- Section IX. Medical equipment

CHAPTER XI. UNIFORMS, PERSONAL EQUIPMENT, AND INSIGNIA

- Section I. Standard Uniforms
- Section II. Uniforms for Special Arms
- Section III. Special cold and hot weather clothing
- Section IV. Individual equipment
- Section V. Insignia, Decorations, and Awards

CHAPTER XII. CONVENTIONAL SIGNS AND ABBREVIATIONS

- Section I. Introduction
- Section II. Geographic signs
- Section III. Military signs
- Section IV. Military abbreviations

CHAPTER XIII. MILITARY TERMS AND CHARACTERS

- Section I. Japanese Year Dates
- Section II. Japanese Weights, Measures, and Moneys
- Section III. Method of Numbering Models

APPENDIX SUPPLEMENTAL DATA

== Changes ==
TM E 30-480 Handbook on Japanese Military Forces had five Changes which were as follows:

1. Change 1: Japanese Airforces (1 January 1945); 39 pages,
2. Change 3: Field Organization (1 June 1945); 94 pages,
3. Change 4: Japanese Fortifications (1 July 1945); 68 pages,
4. Change 5: Naval Ground Units (1 July 1945); 11 pages,
5. Change 6: Weapons (15 September 1945); 228 pages,
6. Change 7: Japanese Military Police (15 August 1945);
