= T95 =

T95 or T-95 may refer to:

== Tanks ==
- T-95, a Russian prototype main battle tank
- 105 mm Gun Motor Carriage T95, an American experimental tank later renamed T28 Super Heavy Tank
- T95 medium tank, an American prototype tank

== Other uses ==
- KICT-FM, a radio station in Wichita, Kansas
- Tanfoglio T95, a pistol
