= Type 98 50 mm mortar =

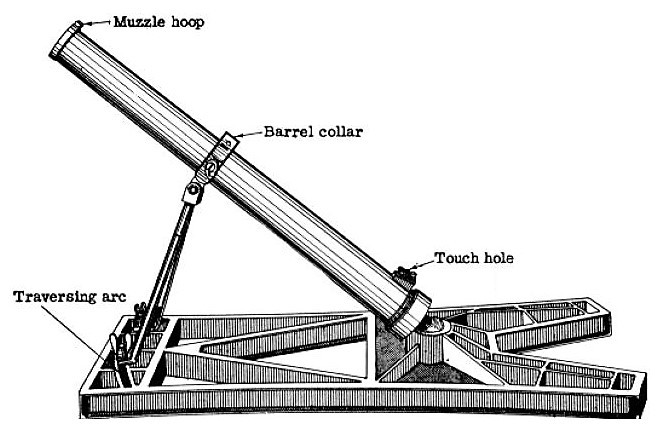
- Place of origin: Empire of Japan

Service history
- Used by: Imperial Japanese Army
- Wars: World War II

Specifications
- Mass: 21.77 kg (50 lb)
- Barrel length: 650 mm (2 ft 2 in)
- Diameter: 50mm
- Shell weight: 6.4 kg (14 lb 2 oz) Stick bomb
- Caliber: 50 mm (1.97 in)
- Action: Manual
- Elevation: +40° Fixed
- Traverse: 7°
- Maximum firing range: 455 m (498 yd)
- Feed system: manual
- Sights: none

The Type 98 50 mm mortar was a Japanese smooth-bore, muzzle-loading weapon of the mid 20th century. The Type 98 designation was given to this weapon because it was accepted in the year 2598 of the Japanese calendar (1938)

The Type 98 was used by Imperial Japanese Army engineers to destroy obstacles via a spigot bomb or bangalore torpedo. Given its specialized role, productions seems to have been limited, lasting from 1939 to 1940.

== Design ==
The Type 98 50 mm mortar could be identified by the rectangular, sectionalized base plate, the fixed position of the bipod, the V slots painted white and located at 12 o'clock on both the barrel collar, and the projection of the muzzle hoop and the marking on the outside of the container in which the weapon is packed. (This marking, which read "Kyuhachi Shiki Totekiki" from right to left, meant "98 Type discharger.")

The propelling charge consisted of black-powder increments packed in small silk bags. Each increment was approximately 3.75 inches long and 1.25 inches in diameter. A pull-type friction primer, 0.88 inch in length, equipped with a loop lanyard, was designed to fit into the primer seat, or touch hole.

The mortar consisted of three main parts: the base plate, the bipod, and the barrel. It had a fixed elevation of about 40 degrees. Limited provision was made for traverse. At the base of the tube was an offset primer seat. Two links, one on each side, extended from the barrel collar. A range slide, graduated from 0 to 60, could be clamped to the muzzle of the mortar.

== Firing procedure ==
To use the weapon, the loader would first insert one or more powder increments in the muzzle, then place the stick of the stick bomb in the tube. To aim, the graduated range slide would be adjusted to the desired distance, which regulated the length of the stick extending into the barrel of the mortar – the more the stick extended into the barrel, the greater the range. (This is similar to aiming the older Type 89 50mm grenade discharger.) To traverse, the mortarman would loosen the two wing nuts that secured the bipod and swing the bipod feet around the area in front of the base plate.

To arm the explosive charge, two friction-type pull igniters were inserted in the holes provided in the base, and each igniter was connected by cord to one of the two links extending one each side from the barrel collar of the mortar. A pull-type friction primer was inserted in the primer seat, which was on the side of the barrel near the base. To fire, the mortarman would pull a loop lanyard attached to the friction primer.

== Maintenance ==
A cleaning brush which was attached to the underside of the carrying box cover. The mortar was easy to disassemble, by unscrewing the thumb screws and removing the bipod feet from the traversing plate, then removing the barrel assembly ball out of the socket in the base plate. Finally, the collar which attaches the bipod to the barrel was removed.

== Ammunition ==
The Type 98 was able to fire at least three different types of projectiles: a finned Bangalore Torpedo and two kinds of stick bombs. The stick bombs were composed of a 48 mm (1.9 in) diameter hardwood stick that fitted into the barrel of the launcher and was reinforced with a metal cap at the bottom to withstand the stress of firing. The other end of the stick fitted into a flange on the bottom of a rectangular head made from sheet steel which was fastened with nails or screws. The head was filled with either a rectangular block of picric acid or with black powder. Two friction igniters would be fitted into holes in the base of the stick bomb and the cords for these fastened to either side of the launcher. When the mortar was fired, the friction igniters were lit and a black-powder delay train started giving a 7 second delay.

Type	Length	Warhead size	Weight	Explosive weight	Explosive type
Bangalore Torpedo	1.96 m (6 ft 5 in)	Diameter: 48 mm (1.9 in)	8.2 kg (18 lb)	2.9 kg (6 lb 5 oz)	Picric acid
Small Stick Bomb	69 cm (2 ft 3 in)	Length: 171 mm (6.75 in) x Width: 110 mm (4.5 in) x Height: 110 mm (4.5 in)	7.1 kg (15 lb 11 oz)	3.2 kg (7 lb)	Picric acid
Large Stick Bomb	65 cm (2 ft 1.5 in)	Length: 110 mm (4.5 in) x Width: 159 mm (6.25 in) x Height: 159 mm (6.25 in)	7.7 kg (17 lb)	4.5 kg (10 lb)	Black powder

50 mm Bangalore Torpedo.

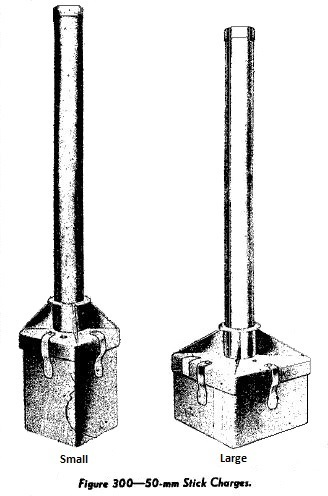
50 mm Stick Bombs.
