= Type 38 10 cm cannon =

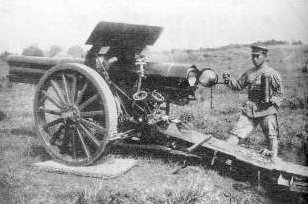
- Type 38 10 cm cannon
- Type: Field gun
- Place of origin: German Empire

Service history
- In service: 1911–1949?
- Used by: See users
- Wars: World War I Russian Civil War; Second Sino-Japanese War; Spanish Civil War; World War II; Chinese Civil War

Production history
- Designer: Krupp
- Designed: 1905
- Manufacturer: Osaka Arsenal
- Produced: 1911-?
- No. built: 102

Specifications
- Mass: Travel: 3,214 kg (7,085 lb); Firing: 2,594 kg (5,719 lb)
- Length: 5 m (16 ft 5 in)
- Barrel length: 3.294 m (10 ft 10 in) L/31.67
- Width: 1.35 m (4 ft 5 in)
- Shell: 105 x 283mm R
- Shell weight: 17.98 kg (39 lb 10 oz)
- Caliber: 105 mm (4.13 in)
- Breech: Interrupted screw
- Recoil: Hydro-spring
- Carriage: Box trail
- Elevation: -2° to +15°
- Traverse: 6°
- Muzzle velocity: 540 m/s (1,772 ft/s)
- Maximum firing range: 10,800 m (11,800 yd)

The Type 38 10 cm cannon (三八式十糎加農砲, Sanhachishiki Jyūsenchi Kanōhō) was a field gun used by the Imperial Japanese Army during World War I, the Second Sino-Japanese War and World War II. It was a licensed copy of a 1905 Krupp design. The Type 38 designation was given to this gun as it was accepted in the 38th year of Emperor Meiji's reign (1905). By 1941 it was thoroughly obsolete and relegated to second-line service.

== History and development ==
Interest in the Krupp 105mm field gun was expressed by the Imperial Japanese Army General Staff in November 1904, during the height of the Russo-Japanese War. As warship production in Japan had priority during the 1890s, the technology and industrial infrastructure to construct medium or large caliber weapons was reserved for the Imperial Navy, as a consequence, the first twenty units were imported from Germany in 1905. Further units were produced under license in Japan by the army's Osaka Arsenal under the direction of arms designer General Arisaka Nariakira from 1907, and began appearing in front line combat units from 1911.

After experience in the First World War, the Type 38 was upgraded to the "C" version, with a lengthened bore and modified carriage to permit a higher angle of fire. This modified version was already obsolete by the start of the Second Sino-Japanese War, but continued to be used by reserve and second-line forces through the end of World War II.

== Design ==
The Type 38 105mm field gun was a conventional design, with crew seats on the gun shield and a solid box trail. It had a hydro-spring recoil system, interrupted screw type breechblock, and 1/16-inch gun shield.

It was designed to be towed by a team of eight horses, or by an arms tractor.

The Type 38 105 mm field gun was capable of firing high-explosive, armor-piercing warhead, shrapnel, incendiary, smoke and illumination and gas shells.

== Japanese Use ==
Type 38 10 cm field gun was initially at the Battle of Tsingtao in China during World War I. It was later used in rear echelon formations in the puppet state of Manchukuo and in various campaigns in mainland China during the Second Sino-Japanese War in the 1930s. Due to its obsolescence, it was not encountered by Allied forces in the Pacific. Some units were also used for shore defense in coastal artillery batteries in the Boso Peninsula, and Tokyo Bay in the Japanese home islands.

== Chinese Use ==
Weapons captured by the Chinese remained in use in China by both the National Revolutionary Army of the Kuomintang government and Chinese Red Army of the Chinese Communist Party government at least through the Chinese Civil War.At the beginning of 1934, Japan will provide twelve copies to the Imperial Army of Manchukuo to complete an artillery regiment.

== Russian and Spanish Use ==
In 1914, 120 guns were ordered by Russian Empire, converted to use 4.2-inch (107mm) Russian munitions for the 107 mm gun M1910. They received the designation 42-line quick-firing gun Model 1905. These guns continued service in the Soviet Red Army until World War II (there were still 88 such guns in 1936). The Soviets later sold 74 guns to the Second Spanish Republic during the Spanish Civil War where they were often used for counter battery fire.

== Users ==
- Imperial Japanese Army
- (Russian Empire) Imperial Russian Army
- (Soviet Union) Soviet Red Army
- (Second Spanish Republic) Spanish Republican Army
- (Taiwan) National Revolutionary Army
- (China) People's Liberation Army
- Manchukuo Imperial Army
