= 7 cm mountain gun =

Japanese ordnance first used in 1883

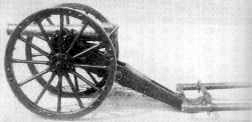
- Type: Mountain gun
- Place of origin: Empire of Japan

Service history
- Used by: Imperial Japanese Army
- Wars: Russo Japanese War; First Sino-Japanese War

Specifications
- Mass: .256 tonnes (560 lb)
- Barrel length: 1 m (3 ft 3 in) L/13.3
- Shell: 4.28 kilograms (9.4 lb)
- Caliber: 7.5 centimetres (3.0 in)
- Elevation: -10° to +21°
- Muzzle velocity: 255 m/s (840 ft/s)
- Maximum firing range: 3,000 m (3,300 yd)

The 7 cm mountain gun was a Japanese ordnance first used in 1883. It was used in the First Sino-Japanese War as the main artillery, and was used again in the Russo-Japanese War by second-line troops .

== History ==
From 1880, the Imperial Japanese Army wanted to produce guns on its own. With Italian help, the army designed new 75 mm guns. Because steel was expensive as a raw material in Japan at the time, bronze was used to produce the gun barrel.
