= Type 38 75 mm field gun =

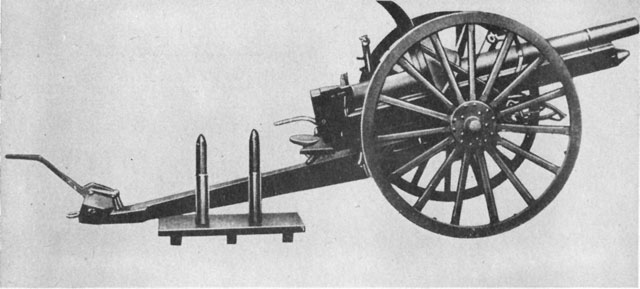
- Side view of the Type 38 with its ammunition
- Type: Field gun
- Place of origin: Empire of Japan

Service history
- In service: 1905–1945
- Used by: Imperial Japanese Army, North Vietnam, Taiwan (Kuomintang), China,
- Wars: World War I Second Sino-Japanese War; Soviet-Japanese Border Wars; World War II; First Indochina War

Production history
- Designer: Krupp
- Manufacturer: Osaka Arsenal
- No. built: ~3,059 all types.
- Variants: Type 38 (improved)

Specifications
- Mass: 947 kg (2,088 lb) (Type 38); 1,135.7 kg (2,504 lb) (improved Type 38)
- Length: 5.2 m (17 ft 1 in) (Firing); 8.94 m (29 ft 4 in) (traveling)
- Barrel length: 2.286 m (7 ft 6 in) L/31
- Width: Track 4 ft 6 in (1.37 m) maximum. 5 ft 2 in (1.57 m)
- Height: 4 ft 10 in (1.47 m)
- Shell: Fixed QF 75 x 294mm R
- Shell weight: 6 kg (13 lb)
- Caliber: 75 mm (2.95 in)
- Breech: Interrupted screw (Type 38) horizontal sliding-wedge (improved Type 38)
- Recoil: Hydro-spring
- Carriage: Box trail
- Elevation: -8° to +16° 30' (Type 38) -8° to +43° (improved Type 38)
- Traverse: 3°30' right, 3°30' left
- Rate of fire: 2 minutes 15 rpm 15 minutes 4 rpm continuous 100-120 rph
- Muzzle velocity: 510 m/s (1,673 ft/s)
- Effective firing range: 8,350 m (9,130 yd) (Type 38)
- Maximum firing range: 11,600 m (12,700 yd) (improved Type 38)
- Feed system: Hand
- Sights: Panoramic

The Type 38 75 mm field gun (三八式野砲, Sanhachi-shiki yahō) was a 1905 German design which was purchased by the Empire of Japan as the standard field gun of the Imperial Japanese Army at the end of the Russo-Japanese War. The Type 38 designation was given to this gun as it was accepted in the 38th year of Emperor Meiji's reign (1905).

== History and development ==
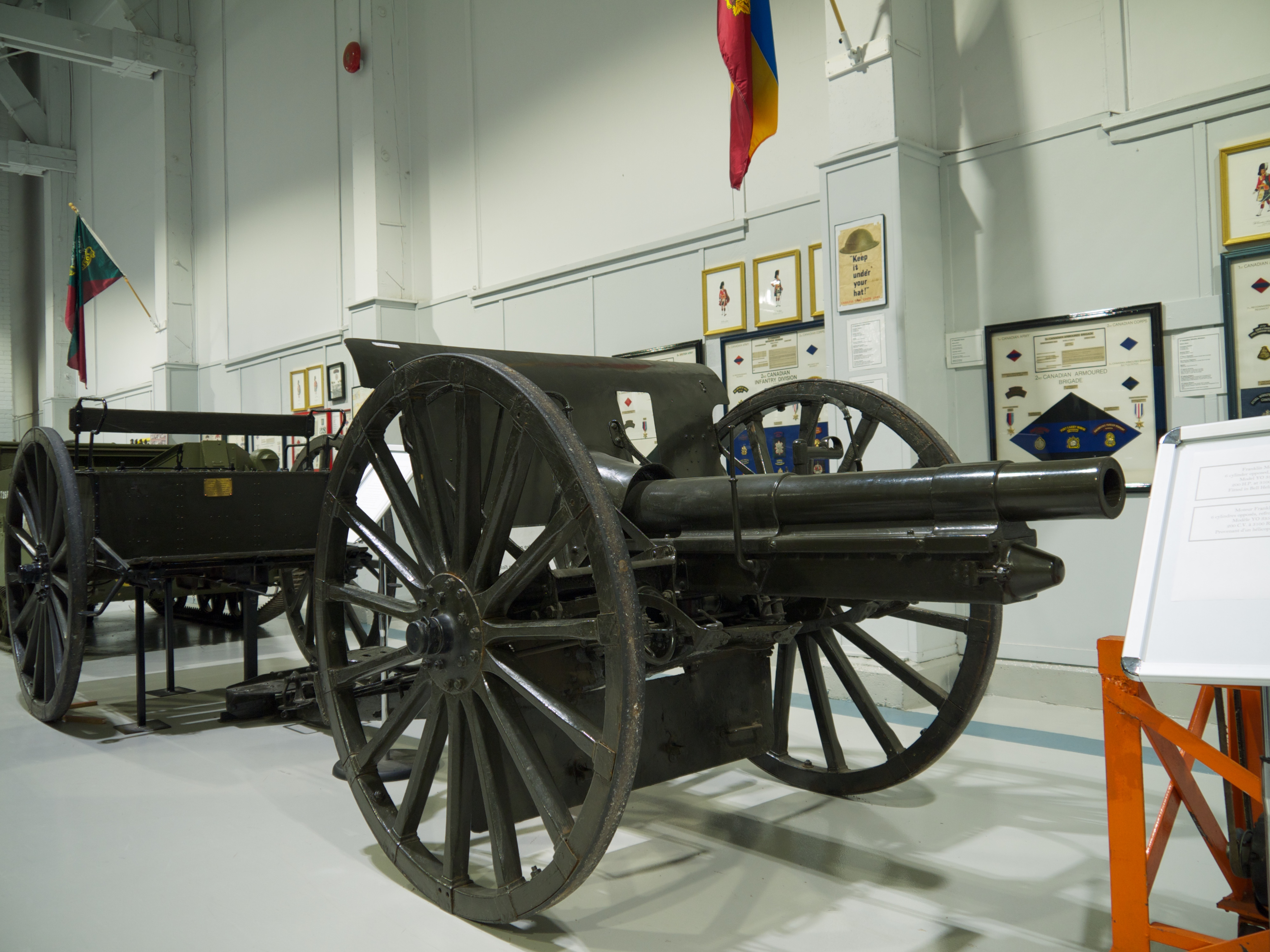
Type 38 75 mm field gun at Base Borden Military Museum

Although Japan had extensive experience with artillery, as the result of its war with Russia in 1904-05, and had the technology and industrial infrastructure to construct medium or large caliber naval weapons prior to World War I, planners at the Imperial Japanese Army General Staff turned to Krupp in Germany, for the latest trend in artillery design. Initial units of Krupp 7.5 cm Model 1903 were imported, and then eventually over 2,000 units, designated "Type 38" in Japan, were produced under license by the army’s Osaka Arsenal.

The original Type 38 gun had a conical interrupted screw, a single box type trail which limited gun elevation to only 16°30'. Also, there were no equilibrators as the trunnions were at the gun barrel's center of balance. All of these shortcomings were remedied with a redesign following World War I.

After World War I, these weapons were considered largely obsolete. However, by this time, Japanese production capabilities had improved, and the Type 38 underwent a re-design in Japan to improve the carriage, with a corresponding increase in elevation, range and rate of fire to 10-12 rounds per minute.

== Design ==
The Type 38 75 mm field gun was a thoroughly conventional design for its day, complete with crew seats on the gun shield and a solid box trail. It had a hydrospring recoil system, interrupted screw type breechblock, and a 1/16-inch gun shield.

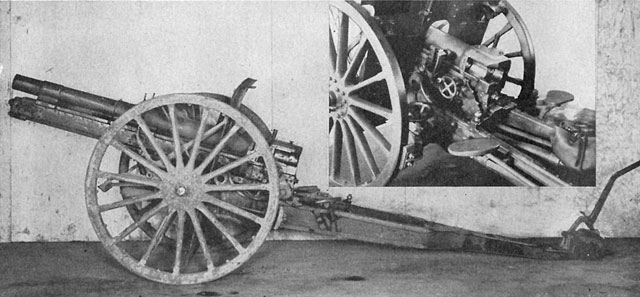
Side view of the improved Type 38 with an inset shot of the breech

Many Type 38 field guns were extensively modified at the Osaka arsenal between 1926 and 1935. The piece was trunnioned forward and equilibrators were added to compensate for muzzle heaviness. It was given a hollow box trail that allowed elevation to 43°. The new version was called the "improved Type 38". Some 400 units were produced in Japan, and it is unclear exactly how many Type 38s were upgraded to the improved version. However, both types were still in service by the start of World War II, despite efforts to replace the design with the Type 90 75 mm field gun.

The Type 38 75 mm field gun (improved) was capable of firing high-explosive, armor-piercing warhead, shrapnel, incendiary, smoke and illumination and gas shells.

Shaped charge anti-tank rounds were developed specifically for the Type 38 75mm field gun during World War II, however, it is unclear if the HEAT round actually entered service before the end of the war.

== Combat record ==
Despite its obsolescence, the Type 38 75 mm field gun was found in theatres of operation in the Second Sino-Japanese War, Soviet-Japanese Border Wars and in the Pacific War.
