= Osaka Arsenal =

Coordinates: 34.687°N 135.534°E

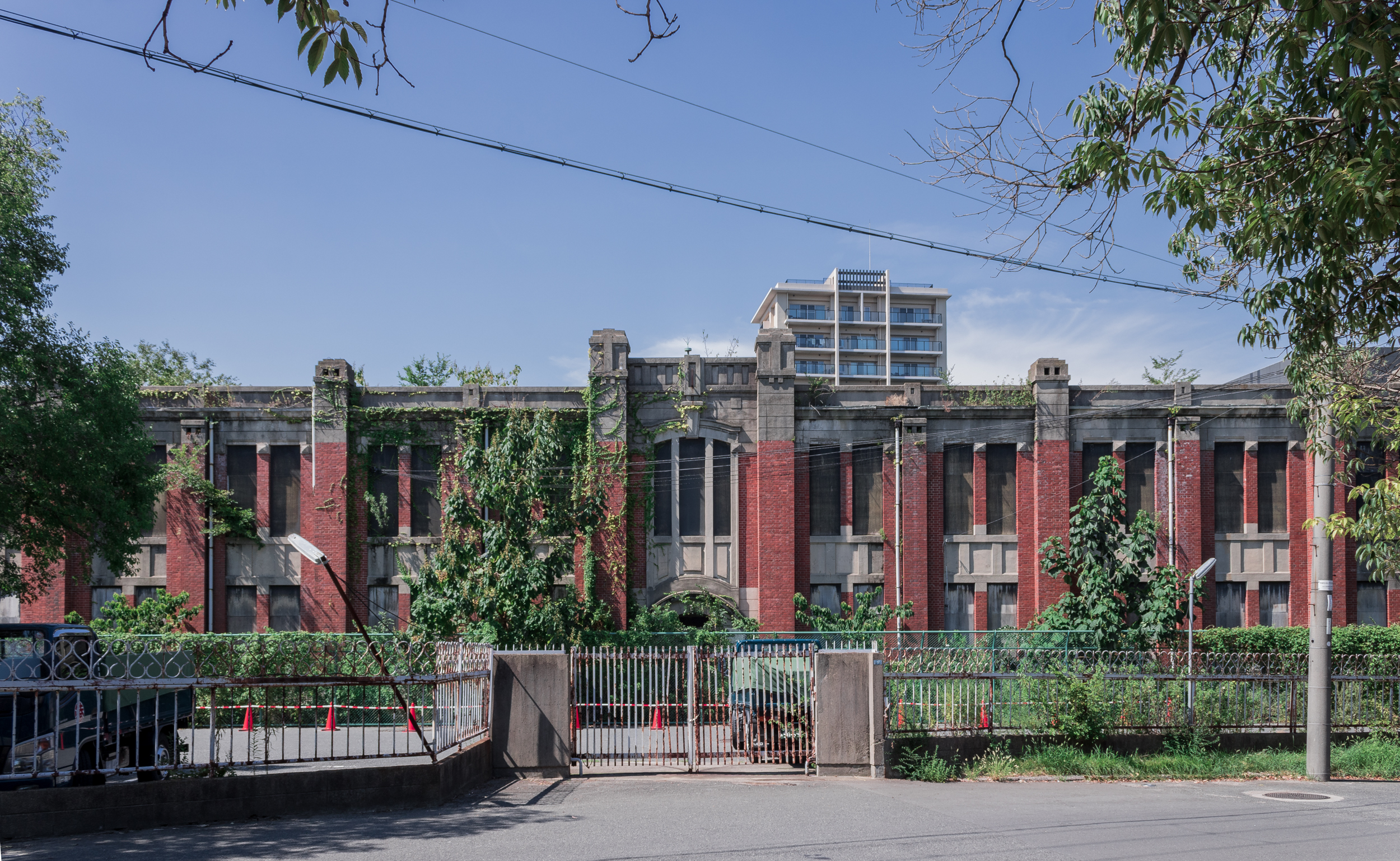
Ruins of the Osaka Arsenal Chemical Laboratory

Map of the roads and rail lines surrounding Osaka Castle. The Osaka Arsenal was located in the red area.

The Osaka Arsenal was a state weapons factory of the Imperial Japanese Army in Osaka during the period from 1870 to 1945.

In the Meiji period, the self-supply of the armed forces with modern weapons was a high concern for the government. The Japanese military leader Ōmura Masujirō proposed to build a garrison with gun and ammunition production facilities at Osaka Castle. The central location of Osaka favored transport routes over land and water. Although Ōmura was the victim of an attack in November 1869, his proposal was nevertheless accepted.

In February 1870 an office for weapons production (造兵司, Zōheishi) was established, and in March of that year the first employees moved into an empty rice warehouse in the northeastern part of Osaka Castle. This was the birth of the Osaka Arsenal. Machines and workers came mainly from the Nagasaki Iron Works.

In 1871 the works were renamed "Office for weapons production Osaka" (大阪 造兵司, Ōsaka Zōheishi); in 1872, "Osaka Factory" (大砲 製造所, Ōsaka Seizōsho); in 1875, "Artillery Office of the 2nd Artillery Military District" (砲兵 第二 方面内 砲兵 支廠, Hōhei Daini Hōmennai Hōhei Shishō); and finally, in 1879, "Artillery Osaka" as the state production center for guns and grenades, while the Arsenal Tokyo was production center for handguns.

During the Satsuma rebellion in 1877, the arsenal was very active to meet the high demand. Other wars, such as the First Sino-Japanese War (1894–1895) and the Russo-Japanese War (1904–1905), allowed the arsenal to expand, so that it captured the entire eastern side of the castle grounds.

The staff strength fluctuated greatly. During times of crisis many workers were hired, only to be released when the crisis passed. This led to tensions with the workforce, especially in December 1906 after the Russo-Japanese War and in October 1919 after the First World War.

During the Pacific War, the workforce of the arsenal grew steadily, reaching over 60,000 employees, and the arsenal developed into one of the largest military factories in the Japanese Empire. Towards the end of the war, however, the production yield sank due to material and labor shortages.

Osaka became the target of American air strikes from 1945. The arsenal was initially only slightly damaged, but on August 14, 1945, a day before the capitulation of Japan, there was a devastating air raid that destroyed 90% of the arsenal. The death toll on the arsenal site was relatively low at 382 dead, as most of the workers, with the exception of air defense, had left the area after the air alarm. The death toll outside the arsenal site is unknown.

With the end of the Pacific War, the 75-year history of the arsenal came to an end. After the war, the extensive grounds were partially overbuilt by commercial high-rise buildings, and partly used as a park (Osaka Castle Park).
