= Semovente da 75/18 =

Italian self-propelled gun of World War Two

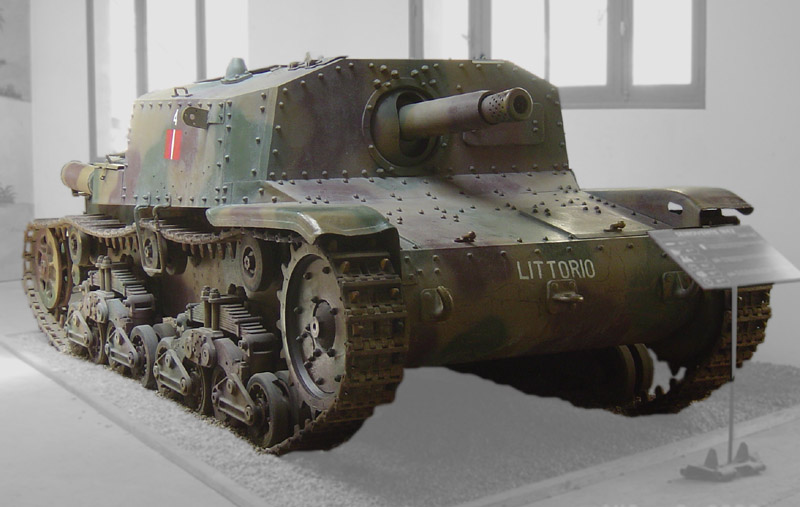
- Type: Self-propelled gun
- Place of origin: Kingdom of Italy

Service history
- In service: 1942–1944 (?)
- Used by: Kingdom of Italy; Italy; Nazi Germany
- Wars: World War II

Production history
- Designed: 1941
- Manufacturer: Ansaldo
- No. built: 467 (pre and post armistice production using M40/41/42 chassis)
- Variants: M. 40 da 75/18 (M13/40 chassis); M. 41 da 75/18 (M14/41 chassis); M. 42 da 75/18 (M15/42 chassis); Carro comando (command tank)

Specifications
- Mass: 13.1 t (29,000 lb)
- Length: 4.915 m (16 ft 1.5 in)
- Width: 2.280 m (7 ft 5.8 in)
- Height: 1.850 m (6 ft 0.8 in)
- Crew: 3 (commander/gunner, driver, loader/radio operator)
- Armour: Front: 30–50 mm (1.2–2.0 in); Sides/rear: 25 mm (0.98 in); Floor/roof: 6–9 mm (0.24–0.35 in)
- Main armament: 1 × 75 mm obice da 75/18 mod. 34, 44 rounds
- Secondary armament: 1 × 8 mm Breda mod. 38 or 6.5 mm Breda mod. 30 machine gun
- Engine: M. 40: SPA 8 T M40 V8 diesel 125 CV (92 kW; 123 hp); M. 41: SPA 15 T M41 V8 diesel 145 CV (107 kW; 143 hp); M. 42: SPA 15 TB M42 V8 water-cooled petrol 195 CV (143 kW; 192 hp)
- Suspension: Semi-elliptical leaf spring bogies
- Operational range: 200 km (120 mi)
- Maximum speed: M. 40: 32 km/h (20 mph); M. 41: 34 km/h (21 mph)

The Semovente da 75/18 was an Italian self-propelled gun of the Second World War. It was built by mounting the 75 mm Obice da 75/18 modello 34 mountain gun on the chassis of a M13/40, M14/41 or M15/42 tank. The first 60 were built using the M13/40 chassis; a further 162 were built on the M14/41 chassis from 1941 to 1943. A total of 190 were built using the M42 chassis before the armistice and an additional 55 were built afterwards. The Semovente da 75/18 was intended to be an interim vehicle until the heavier P40 tank could be available.

== History ==
Italian artillery Colonel Sergio Berlese, who also designed the Obice da 75/18 modello 34 howitzer, suggested that Italy create an armoured fighting vehicle similar to the German StuG III assault gun, which had been successful in the French campaign in 1940. The first prototype was quickly assembled and delivered, on February 10, 1941, only 13 months after the first M13/40 tank upon which it was based. After that, 60 more examples were ordered. They were delivered in 1941, and were then shipped to North Africa in January 1942. This initial batch was based on the M13 chassis, with its weak 125 hp engine (later to be replaced by one of 145 hp, with the M14 chassis).

== Design ==
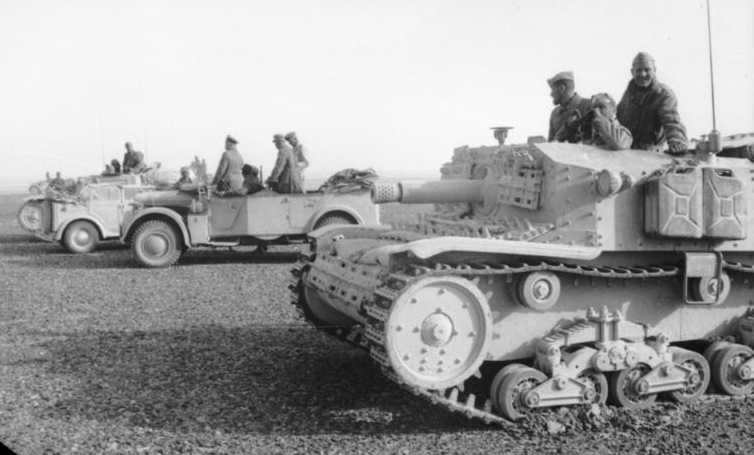
Semovente da 75/18 during the North African Campaign, 1942.

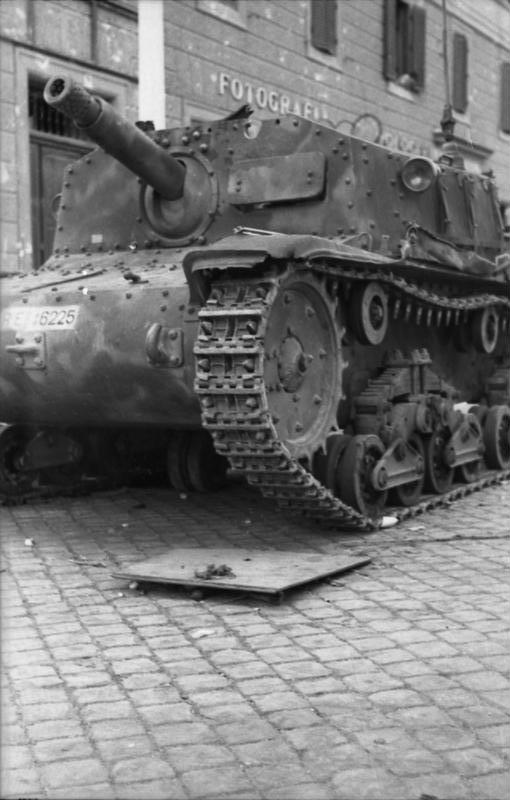
A Semovente da 75/18 in Italy in 1943 clearly showing the 75 mm main armament.

This self-propelled gun was built with riveted steel plates, which were thicker but also less sloped than in the original tank (50 mm as against 42 mm max). Frontal armour was almost vertical, but it consisted of two plates that strengthened it when compared to a simple homogeneous steel plate.

The vehicle had its crew compartment and drive section forward, in a large and low casemate; the engine was situated behind it, in a separate structure (typical of Italian designs), which was sloped and somewhat smaller, and had inspection panels on the roof. The chassis was identical to that of M13/40 tanks, with eight small wheels in four trolleys which were joined in pairs by two arms. Suspensions were of the leaf spring type, which was reliable but didn't allow for high speeds. The transmission was located in the forward part of the vehicle, and the crew consisted of only three members: driver, loader/radio operator, and tank commander/gunner.

The main gun was a derivative of a 75 mm L/18 gun. This was 18 calibers long, with 40° traverse and −12/+22° elevation. The gun had a muzzle brake, and there were several observation and aiming systems (binoculars, periscopes and others) for the crew. The low muzzle velocity (around 450 m/s) meant a relative short range, 9,500 m at best elevation of 45 degrees, but the installation allowed only 22° and so the range was limited to around 7–8 km. The range in direct fire mode was also limited, especially against moving targets, for the same reason. Only one roof-mounted machine gun was fitted for close defence, though sometimes it was omitted. Initially, this was a 6.5 mm Breda, later upgraded to an 8 mm model. Ammunition load was typically 44 75 mm shells and 1,108 8 mm cartridges. In the North African theatre, some crews stored up to 100 shells by removing their seats and filling the space with the extra rounds. A model RF1 CA with interphone radio was usually fitted.

== Service ==
Although the type was not widely known, it performed effectively in its intended role. Though it was technically similar to the StuG III, it had a totally different role, serving as divisional artillery instead of a pure assault gun. The organic structure consisted of two artillery groups for every armoured division, with two batteries each (four 75/18 each and a command vehicle). The total was of 18 75 mm L/18 (included two in reserve) and 9 command vehicles, which were characterized by additional radio equipment and a Breda 13.2 mm heavy machine gun mounted instead of the main gun. The number originally ordered, 60 total, was enough for the three armoured divisions.

The Semovente da 75/18s were deployed in the North African campaign and during the Allied invasion of Sicily, alongside M tank units to provide additional firepower. Despite the fact that they were not designed to fight other tanks, their 75 mm howitzer proved ideal (thanks to its low muzzle velocity) for firing HEAT shells; its 5.2 kg HEAT shell ("Effetto Pronto" in Italian) could pierce 80 mm of armour at 500 meters, and could thus defeat tanks such as the US built M3 Grant and M4 Sherman used by the British Army. As such, these machines were responsible for many of the successes by the Italian armoured troops during 1942–43, when the medium tanks (which were all armed with a 47 mm M35 gun) were no longer effective. On another account, the Semovente da 75/18 on M14 chassis allowed the 132nd Armoured Division Ariete and the 133rd Armoured Division Littorio a somewhat wider tactical repertoire until British deployment of U.S. medium tanks negated that small advantage.

The most successful action fought by Semovente da 75/18 took place on 10 June 1942, south of the Knightsbridge Box, during the Battle of Gazala. Thirty M3 Grants and ten M3 Stuarts of 1st and 6th Royal Tank Regiments attacked a position held by the Ariete division but were repelled by Semovente da 75/18s as well as some M13/40s and gun trucks, losing three Grants and two Stuarts from 6th Royal Tank Regiment and twelve Grants and three Stuarts from 1st Royal Tank Regiment. The Italians lost two M13/40s.

Despite its limitations (namely its cramped interior and the insufficiently powerful engine in the M40 and M41 variants), the Semovente da 75/18 proved successful both in the direct support role and in anti-tank fighting; its main advantages, other than their sheer firepower, was in its thicker armour relative to the medium tanks and lower silhouette that made it more difficult to hit. Due to these features, the Semovente da 75/18 has been regarded as the only Italian armoured fighting vehicle to be seriously feared by Allied tank crews, and despite the fact that it was originally conceived for a totally different role, the 75/18 often ended up replacing the standard M13/40. However, it was never employed en masse, and the low number of Semoventi on the field (no more than 30 at the time of the Second Battle of El Alamein) was not enough to turn the tide in Italy's favour.

In 1942, more vehicles were built: 162, all with the M41 hull, recognizable by the all-length fenders; in 1943, production shifted to the M42 variant, with the M15/42 tank chassis and engine. It was also decided to address the shortcomings of the M14/41 tank by bolstering each unit with some Semoventi, in addition to the three armoured divisions fielded, though very few Italian divisions actually received any.

The necessity for a longer and more powerful gun led to the development of the 75/34, 75/46 and 105/25 self-propelled guns.

== German use ==
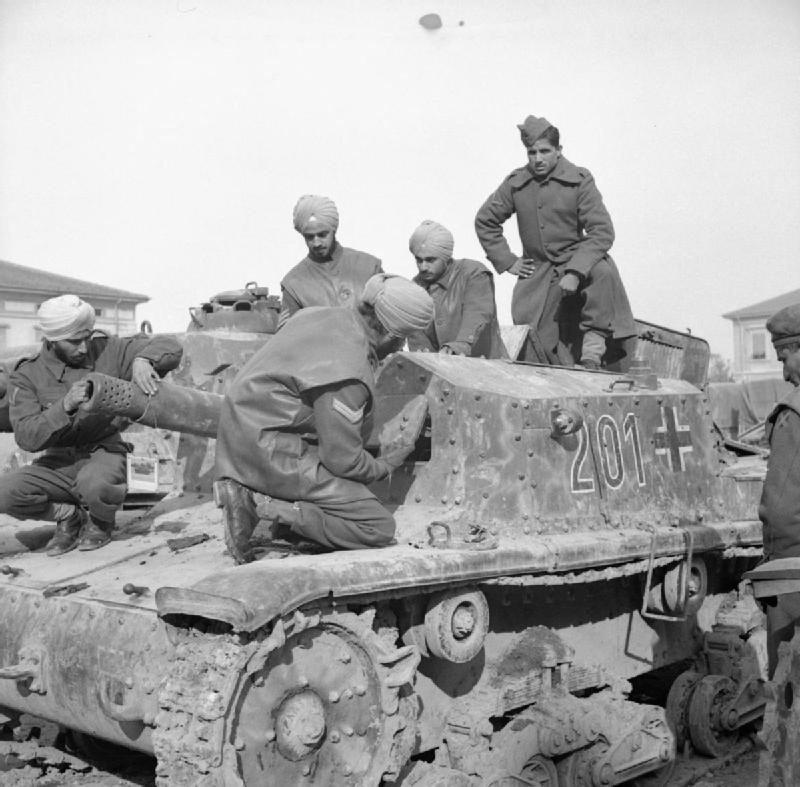
Indian troops inspect a captured Semovente in German markings in Forlì, 30 January 1945.

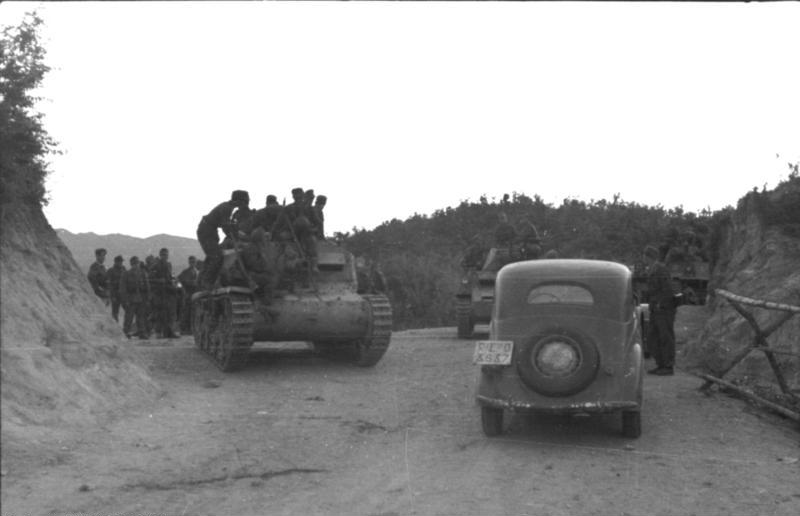
Semovente da 75/18 with German troops in Albania, September 1943.

After the Italian surrender in 1943, some 131 Semovente da 75/18 were seized by the Germans and the production of another 55 was authorized. They were, in combination with other Semovente models, issued to twelve divisions (nine infantry, one mountain, one Jäger and one Grenadier) and three assault-gun brigades as well as to the 12th SS Polizei Panzer Company. All units were intended for service in Italy or the Balkans. They were designated StuG M42 mit 7,5 KwK L 18(850)(i).

== Surviving vehicles ==
A number of 75/18 still survive today. Those include, listed by variants:

- a M 40 (Plate Number 4445), now at the Aberdeen Proving Ground.
- a damaged M 40 is exhibited at the El Alamein Military Museum.
- a M 40 or M 41, exhibited at the Musée des Blindés, Saumur.
- a M 41 (Pl. No. 4462) which was recovered after the war and served in the post–war Italian Army with limited modifications. It is now stored at the Historical Museum of Military Motorization, Cecchignola (Rome).
- a M 41 (Pl. No. 5727). Like the Roman one, this 75/18 was employed by the post-war Italian Army. Restored in 2005 by the Oto Melara, it is now housed in this company's museum at La Spezia.
- a M 41 at the Scuola truppe corazzate, Caserta.
- a M 42 at the Reggimento Artiglieria a Cavallo, Milan.
- a M 42 (Pl. No. 6173) with a dummy gun is located at the Rocca di Bergamo.
- a M 42 at the Parco delle Rimembranze, Lonate Pozzolo (without gun).
- a StuG M 42, numbered 114, was built under German control in early 1944. On 21 September, after a battle near Rimini it was abandoned in a crater. It was rediscovered and unearthed in 2000, and restored by the Museo dell'Aviazione at Rimini, where it has been exhibited since 2004.
- an unspecified 75/18 is mentioned to be at Nocera Inferiore (Naples).

== In popular culture ==
- The Semovente da 75/18 is featured in the game Company of Heroes 3 as a combat vehicle under the Afrikakorps' Italian Combined Arms Battlegroup. It features both anti-tank direct fire and support short-ranged artillery fire roles, which are accurate to the self-propelled gun's historical use.
