= Carro armato =

Carro Armato (armored vehicle) was the Italian Army's designation for tanks from 1938. This would be followed by a letter and a series of numbers. The letter would be either L, M or P meaning light (leggero), medium (medio), and heavy (pesante) respectively. The official Italian military tank classification differed from contemporary classifications in other countries. The numbers would follow the pattern of X/Y where X would be the weight in tonnes and Y the year of adoption (i.e. the L6/40 weighs 6 tonnes and was adopted in the year 1940). The following are some Carro Armatos that entered service:

- Carro Armato L5/21: Fiat L5/21 light tank
- Carro Armato L5/30: Fiat L5/30 light tank
- Carro Armato L6/40: Fiat L6/40 light tank
- Carro Armato M11/39: Fiat M11/39 medium tank
- Carro Armato M13/40: Fiat M13/40 medium tank
- Carro Armato M14/41: Fiat M14/41 medium tank
- Carro Armato M15/42: Fiat M15/42 medium tank
- Carro Armato P40: Fiat P26/40 heavy tank

NOTE: The L3/33 and the L3/35 tankettes were designated "Fast Tank" (Carro Veloce) and were initially known as the CV-33 and the CV-35.

== See also ==
- Carro Armato Celere Sahariano, prototype medium tank
- Carro Armato P.43, prototype heavy tank

== Bibliography ==
- Riccio, Ralph A. (2010). Italian Tanks and Combat Vehicles of World War II. Fidenza: Roadrunner. ISBN 97-88-6261-141-1.
