= Semovente da 75/34 =

Italian self-propelled gun

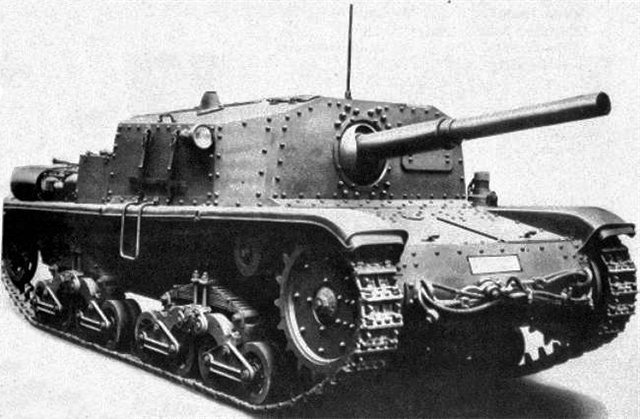
- Type: Self-propelled gun
- Place of origin: Italy

Service history
- In service: 1943–1945
- Used by: Italy, Nazi Germany
- Wars: World War II

Production history
- Manufacturer: Ansaldo
- Produced: 1942–1944?
- No. built: 170 (including both M42 and M43 variants)

Specifications
- Mass: 15 tonnes (33,069 lbs)
- Length: 5.04 m (16 ft 6 in)
- Width: 2.23 m (7 ft 4 in)
- Height: 1.8 m (5 ft 11 in)
- Crew: 3 (commander/gunner, driver, loader/radio operator)
- Armour: Front: 42 mm (1.65 in)
- Main armament: 75 mm L/34 gun
- Secondary armament: 1×8 mm Breda 38 machine gun
- Engine: SPA 15TB M42 petrol V8 water cooled 192 hp/2,400 rpm
- Power/weight: 12.7 hp/ton
- Suspension: vertical volute spring
- Operational range: 230 km (143 mi)
- Maximum speed: 20 mph (32 km/h)

The Semovente da 75/34 was an Italian self-propelled gun developed and used during World War II. It was a 75 mm L/34 gun mounted on a M15/42 tank chassis. It saw action during the defence of Rome in 1943 and later served with the Germans in Northern Italy and the Balkans. 170 were produced during the war (60 M42 variants before the Armistice of Cassibile in September 1943, 110 M42/M43 variants later under German control).

== Development ==
After the success of the Semovente da 75/18, it was decided to build a vehicle with a better gun, to improve its anti-tank capability (which on the former was given by the use of HEAT shells); some prototypes were built which replaced the Obice da 75/18 with a 75 mm L/32 field gun on the M14/41 tank chassis. Production began in spring 1943, with the 75 mm L/34 gun (the same as on the Carro Armato P 40) on the chassis of the M15/42 tank. Some sixty were built before the Italian armistice in September 1943.

== Design ==
While derived from the earlier Semovente, it differed somewhat from it; instead of two conjoined plates each 21 millimetres (0.83 in) thick, the frontal armour was made of a single 42 millimetres (1.7 in) thick plate and the casemate was modified to fit the longer gun. It had the same 192 HP petrol engine of the M15/42 which allowed for a reasonable top speed of 38.4 kilometres per hour (23.9 mph).

== Service ==
The only operational use by the Regio Esercito was in the unsuccessful defence of Rome from 8–10 September 1943. After the Armistice of Cassibile, Italy switched sides in the war and their former ally, Germany, became their enemy. Some twelve Semoventi da 75/34 were assigned to the CXXXV Self-propelled Anti-tank Battalion of the 135th Armored Cavalry Division "Ariete". Only a few were destroyed in the fighting and the rest were seized by the Germans, which employed them in Italy and the Balkans; under German direction, some eighty more were built until 1945.

== See also ==
=== Comparable vehicles ===
- Germany – StuG III, StuG IV and Jagdpanzer IV
- Romania – Mareșal
- Soviet Union – SU-85
- United Kingdom – SP 17pdr, A30 (Challenger)
- United States – M10 GMC
