= Carro Armato Celere Sahariano =

Italian medium tank prototype

Carro Armato M Celere Sahariano (M16/43)
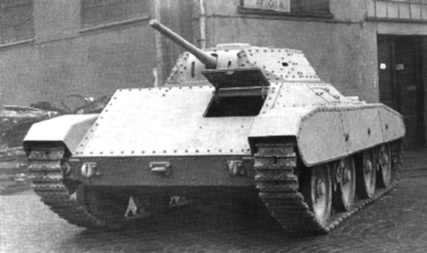
- Type: Medium tank
- Place of origin: Italy

Service history
- Used by: Kingdom of Italy

Production history
- Designer: Ansaldo
- Produced: 1943
- No. built: 1 (complete spring 1942)

Specifications
- Mass: 16 tonnes
- Length: 5.8 m (19 ft)
- Width: 2.8 m (9 ft 2 in)
- Height: 2.0 m (6 ft 7 in)
- Crew: 4
- Armour: 30 mm (1.2 in) front, 25 mm (0.98 in) sides
- Main armament: 1 × 47 mm 47/40 L40 then Cannone da 75/34
- Secondary armament: 2 × 8 mm Breda 38 machine guns
- Engine: SPA gasoline 275 hp (205 kW)
- Power/weight: 17.19 hp (12.82 kW)/tonne
- Suspension: Torsion bar
- Operational range: 300 km (190 mi)
- Maximum speed: 55 km/h (34 mph)

The Carro Armato M Celere Sahariano (Italian for "Saharian Fast Medium Tank") or M16/43 was a prototype medium tank developed by the Kingdom of Italy during World War II to match the speed and firepower of contemporary British cruiser tanks encountered by Italian forces during the Western Desert Campaign. The project was cancelled following the expulsion of Axis forces from North Africa in May 1943. Had it entered service, the tank's designation would likely have been M16/43: "M" for Medio, "16" representing the vehicle's weight in metric tons and "43" being the planned year of introduction.

== Development ==
In early 1941, the Italian Army requested that Ansaldo develop a low profile 15 to 16 t (15 to 16 long tons; 17 to 18 short tons) tank to counter the faster A-13 series tanks exemplified by the Crusader tank. Ansaldo began the new tank project in June 1941 by creating a wooden mock-up on a M14/41 medium tank chassis, inclining the tank's armour plates to create a glacis. The armour remained, like other contemporary Italian tanks of the period, riveted rather than welded together and generally thinner than tanks of other countries. Many different engines, including petrol-fueled aircraft engines, were tested on the chassis before development of the Sahariano tank was halted. At the time of cancellation a 275 hp (205 kW) gasoline engine was being tested. An elongated M14/41 turret housing a 47 mm 47/40 L40 was tested on the Sahariano tank and would also be used by the M15/42 medium tank. There were plans to later fit a 75 mm gun on the production model of the Sahariano tank as well. The Sahariano was the first Italian tank to feature a torsion bar suspension system a more robust and faster suspension system than the leaf spring bogies used on previous Italian tank designs. Ansaldo based the Sahariano's suspension on British tanks encountered in North Africa and a captured Soviet BT-5 from the Spanish Civil War. By the time of the project's cancellation, the design looked similar to their British counterparts but with a notably lower design profile, making the tank easier to conceal and more difficult to hit.

The prototype was declined because there was no need for a desert tank. Even though it was never mass produced, the only prototype was used during defense of Italian mainland. After armistice in 1943 it was scrapped. Several factors contributed to the project's demise: the concurrent development of the Carro Armato P 40 heavy tank; the strain of introducing a new tank model on an already weakened Italian industrial base; the potential of license production of foreign tanks such as the Czechoslovak T-21 medium tank; and, most decisively, Italy's loss of its Libya colony and the seeming end of a need for a fast tank.
