= P26/40 tank =

Italian tank of World War Two

Carro Armato P 26/40
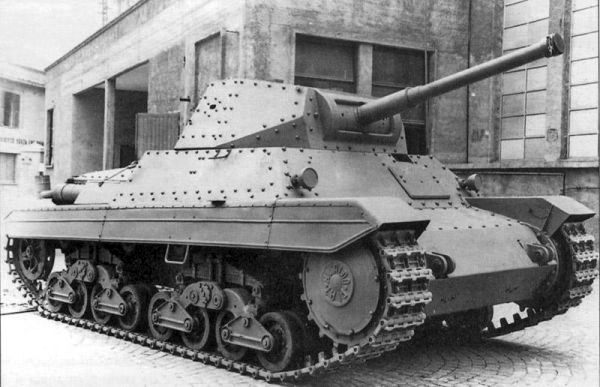
- P26/40 tank in Fiat-Ansaldo factory.
- Type: Heavy tank/Medium tank
- Place of origin: Italy

Service history
- Used by: Italy; Italian Social Republic; Germany; Italian resistance movement (Captured)
- Wars: World War II

Production history
- Designed: 1940–1943
- Manufacturer: Ansaldo
- Produced: 1943–1944
- No. built: 103 or 110/120

Specifications
- Mass: 26 tonnes
- Length: 5.80 m (19 ft 0 in)
- Width: 2.80 m (9 ft 2 in)
- Height: 2.5 m (8 ft 2 in)
- Crew: 4 (commander/gunner, loader, driver, radio-operator)
- Armour: Turret: front 60 mm (2.4 in), sides and rear 45 mm (1.8 in), top 20 mm (0.8 in); Hull: front 50 mm (2.0 in), sides 45 mm (1.8 in) and rear 40 mm (1.6 in), bottom 14 mm (0.6 in)
- Main armament: Ansaldo 75 mm L/34 gun
- Secondary armament: 1-2 × 8 mm Breda 38 machine guns
- Engine: V-12 SPA 342 diesel, 24 litre 330 hp (243 kW)
- Power/weight: 11.53 hp/tonne
- Suspension: Semi-elliptical leaf spring bogies
- Operational range: 280 km (170 mi)
- Maximum speed: 40 km/h (25 mph) road 25 km/h (16 mph) off-road

The P 26/40 was an Italian World War II heavy tank (sometimes defined medium tank when compared to tanks of other nations). It was armed with a 75 mm gun and an 8 mm Breda machine gun, plus another optional machine gun in an anti-aircraft mount. Design had started in 1940 but very few had been built by the time Italy signed the armistice with the Allies in September 1943 and the few produced afterwards were used by Germany.

The official Italian designation was carro armato ("armoured vehicle") P 26/40. The designation means: P for pesante ("heavy"), the weight of 26 tonnes, and the year of adoption (1940). While considered a heavy tank according to Italy's standards, the P26/40 was much more similar in weight and performance to the medium tanks of other nations.

== History ==
The development work began in 1940, on Benito Mussolini's specific orders. Initial requirements were for a 20 tonne (the maximum load allowed by pontoon bridges) tank with a 47 mm gun, three machine-guns and a crew of five, but this was quickly superseded by another 25 tonne design, to be named P26. The development work proceeded quickly except for the engine; the Italian military staff, the Stato Maggiore, wanted a diesel power-plant, while the builders favoured a petrol engine.

However, in Italy at the time there were no engines (diesel or petrol) available capable of developing the 300 hp (220 kW) required, and the Italian tank industry (i.e. the duopoly Fiat-Ansaldo) did not turn to easily available aircraft engines for its tanks as contemporary US and British tank manufacturers had done. The design and development of a new engine was very slow; a 420 hp (310 kW) petrol engine (Fiat 262) was eventually tested as an interim solution, even though it was not adopted.

Provisionally called P75 (from the gun's caliber), the first design (whose prototype was ready on mid-1941) was similar to an enlarged M13/40, but with a 75/18 howitzer (the same fitted on the Semovente da 75/18) and more armour; the prototype was then modified by replacing the main gun with a 75/32 gun with a co-axial machine-gun. After learning about Soviet T-34s in 1941, thanks to a captured tank supplied by the Germans, the whole design was radically modified: the armour was quickly thickened (from 40 to 50 mm on the front and from 30 to 40 mm on the sides) and re-designed, adopting more markedly sloped plates, and the new 75/34 gun was adopted; meanwhile the dual barbette mount in the hull was deleted. The gun designation "75/34" referred to a 75 mm bore diameter gun with a length equal to 34 calibres. However, the weight increase (which was now 26 tonnes) and the difficulties in finding a suitable engine further hampered the start of mass production; in the end, it was decided that the prototype and the early production samples were to be equipped with a 330 HP SPA 8V diesel engine, later to be replaced by a 420 HP petrol engine.

Only a few (between one and five depending on the source) pre-production models were completed in the months before the Italian Armistice in September 1943, at which point they were taken over by the German Wehrmacht. A few were used in combat, under the German designation of Panzerkampfwagen P40 737(i), for example at Anzio; some, without engines, were used as static strongpoints.

== Combat history ==
Only 21 P40s were finished by September 1943 and during the armistice it served in the defence of Rome. The Germans ordered production to continue after the armistice and appropriated completed tanks to the Southern Tank Training Battalion, 10th and 15th Police Panzer Companies, and the 24th Waffen Mountain Division of the SS Karstjäger. The Southern Tank Training Battalion trained units to use captured Italian tanks and had five P40s in their inventory. The 10th Police Panzer Company served in Russia before redeployment to northern Italy in late 1944 for anti-partisan duties with the 15th Police Panzer Company. Formed in summer of 1944, the 24th Waffen Mountain Division was deployed to Trieste and Udine along the Adriatic coast. While retreating towards Austria in March 1945, they lost several P40 tanks to Shermans of the British 6th Armoured Division. About a hundred P40s were used by the German military, of which about 40 were without engines and used as static emplacements at defensive positions such as the Gustav and Gothic Lines.

The tank served also under Italian crew; it was employed in small numbers in the Armored Group Leoncello of the Italian Social Republic. One of the Leoncello's P40s was captured by the Italian partisan after the revolts in Milan.

...the tank P40 was employed by the Group "Leoncello" only in the latest days of the war, when a part of "Leoncello" was sent in Milan, where Mussolini had moved its headquarters, in a first attempt to make the city as a sort of "fort" in which waiting the arrive of the Allies. This was one of the fantasious projects products in that last spots of the war by many chiefs of Republican Fascism, like the one conceived by Pavolini about the so called "Ridotto" of Valtellina. In Milan, as a matter of fact, it was planned to concentrate the majors of Fascism in the area of Corso Monforte an Via Mozart, where there were the Prefecture and the command of the Black Brigades, and, for this reason, the little group of tankers of "Leoncello" received two P40 tanks from Germans, who also trained them for a little. The tanks was then employed only for garrison's duties and they did not take part in any fights against partisan. The tanks were abandoned by their crews during the insurrection of April 25th and at least one of them was re-used by partisans during that day (with a big and evident comunnist symbol painted on it). The two tanks were produced by Vanzetti's factory, a small factory that was producing armors under license during the last period of wartime (the history of the two tanks was confirmed in a letter by captain Zuccaro, creator and commander of "Leoncello"). The two P40s did not have any symbol of the Armord Group "Leoncello", they had only the usual camouflage pattern of that type of tank...

== Design ==
The turret was operated by two crew members and this was a significant drawback as it put excessive workload on the tank's commander. At that time, most new tanks were designed with three-man turrets. It also lacked a commander's cupola.

The main weapon was the 75/34 gun, a development of the Model 37 divisional gun (34 calibres long), retaining the same dimensions. This weapon had a muzzle velocity of around 700 m/s (2,300 ft/s); and was normally provided with around 75 rounds of ammunition. Its armour-piercing shells could penetrate roughly 70 mm of armour at 500 meters. For secondary armament, the P40 had a co-axial machine-gun and another which could be used in the anti-aircraft role, eschewing the traditional dual mount in the hull; the standard ammunition load was also lower, only around 600 rounds, compared to 3,000 of the "M" series.

The mechanical systems were a development of the "M" series, in particular the leaf spring suspension which was reliable, but in rough terrain would not allow speeds similar to the more modern Christie suspension or torsion bar suspension. Nevertheless, the power-to-weight ratio represented a significant improvement in mobility over its predecessors.

The armour, quite resistant by Italian standards, was sloped and 60 mm thick at the turret front and mantlet (by comparison the M13/40 had 42 mm), but it was still riveted at a time when most tanks were constructed by welding. Compared to welded armour, riveted armour is vulnerable to breaking apart at the joints meaning that even quite resistant plates can be defeated by rivet failures. The front armour had a compound slope with a best facing of 50 mm/45 degrees.

The armour was capable of protecting the tank against early anti-tank (and tank) guns such as the British 40 mm (1.6 in) QF 2-pounder, but was vulnerable to subsequent anti-tank weapons such as the 57 mm, (2.24 in) QF 6-pounder that entered service in 1942, and was completely overmatched by the 76 mm (3 in) QF 17-pounder coming into use in 1943.

The P40 design was reasonably up-to-date, but the tank was without some modern features such as welded armour, modern suspension, and a cupola for the commander. The P 40 was designated as a heavy tank in Italy, not because of its weight, but because of its intended role in support of the widely used medium ("M") tanks on the battlefields. In weight, armour and armament it was similar to the medium tanks of the Wehrmacht or other contemporary armies, its armament and protection being roughly the same as the early production American M4 Sherman tank. It was the final evolution of Italian tank designs, that began with the Vickers-based tankettes (such as the CV29 and L3/35) and developed into models such as the M11/39 medium tank, a much heavier construction whose internal design shared many characteristics of the earlier tankettes.

== Production ==
Some 1,200 tanks were ordered (but the total was later reduced to 500 when development work on the heavier P 43 began), but the start of production was delayed by the engine problems and by other factors, such as the bombing of the SPA factory in Turin in September 1942; in the end, production began only in summer 1943.

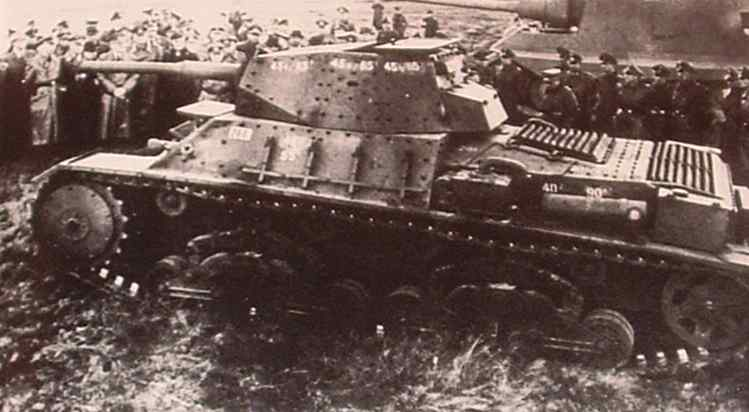
The first P40 was inspected by Hitler personally.

About a hundred and twenty P 40s were built by Ansaldo from then until the end of the war, although most were not entirely completed because of a lack of engines.

== Variants ==
There were at least two planned variants of the P 40, developed from early 1943 when the Italian Army realized that the tank was inferior to other designs such as the German Panther. The first one was named P.43, a tank with a weight of some 30 tonnes, with armour plates some 50–80 mm thick and a main armament of either the 75/34 gun or a 105/23 gun. In September 1943 Fiat and Ansaldo began development of a new design which could be comparable to the Panther, and the result was the P 43 bis, with heavily sloped armour, a 450 HP engine and a 90/42 gun. These designs never passed the wooden mock-up stage, but it is possible that a prototype was created in the first months of 1945.

The other project was the Semovente 149/40, based on the P 40 hull. Only one of these vehicles was ever built. It was intended to be a highly mobile self-propelled gun, and its armament was the most powerful gun of the Royal Italian Army: a 149 mm / 40 calibre artillery piece with a range of over 23 km (14 mi) (slightly more than that of the US 155 mm M1 Long Tom). This gun was produced in very few numbers, and the Italian artillery remained equipped mainly with obsolete weapons for the duration of the war. Due to its mass, it was quite bulky to move, and so it was decided to build a self-propelled version, utilizing the most powerful of all Italian military vehicles. All space of the P 40 hull was dedicated to supporting the gun, so the ammunition and crew would have required additional vehicles to be moved. The gun would have been ready to fire in three minutes from coming to a stop, compared to the 17 minutes required by towed artillery.

Work on the Semovente 149/40 started in 1942 and the prototype was tested in 1943, but the Italian Army was not very impressed. After the Armistice the vehicle was acquired by the Germans, and they were not impressed by it either. Finally American forces captured it during the invasion of Germany and sent it to the Aberdeen Proving Ground for testing.

== Surviving vehicles ==
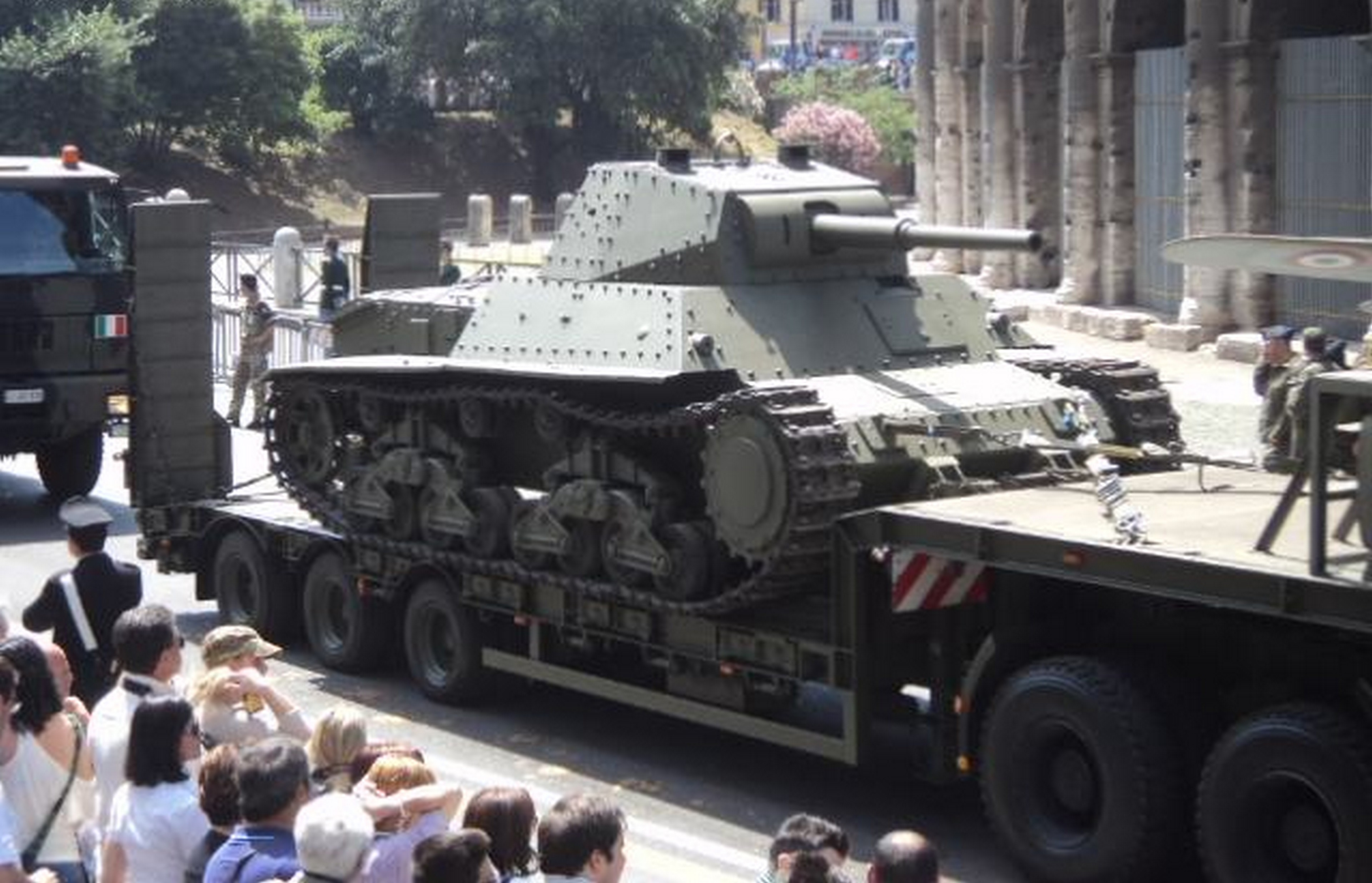
Surviving P26/40 during Italian Army parade in 2011.

Two P26/40s still exist, one preserved at the Museo della Motorizzazione in Rome and another is currently on display near the army barracks near Lecce.

== See also ==
=== Tanks of comparable role, performance, and era ===
- Australian Sentinel cruiser tank
- British Cromwell cruiser tank
- Canadian Ram II cruiser tank
- French SOMUA S35 cavalry tank
- German Panzer III and Panzer IV medium tank
- Hungarian Turán III medium tank
- Hungarian 44M Tas heavy tank
- Italian P43 heavy tank (proposal)
- Japanese Type 3 Chi-Nu medium tank
- Soviet T-34 medium tank
- Swedish Stridsvagn m/42 medium tank
- United States M4 Sherman medium tank

== Sources ==
- C. Falessi and B. Pafi, "Il carro armato P. 40", Storia Illustrata #150, May 1970.
- Pignato, Nicola, Storia dei mezzi corazzati, Fratelli Fabbri Editore, 1976, volume 2
- Sgarlato, Nico, I corazzati italiani, an illustrated monograph on Italian tanks and self-propelled guns, April 2006.
- F Cappellano & P P Battistelli (2012). Italian Medium Tanks (New Vanguard No. 195) UK: Osprey Publishing. ISBN 9781849087759.
