= Semovente da 20/70 quadruplo =

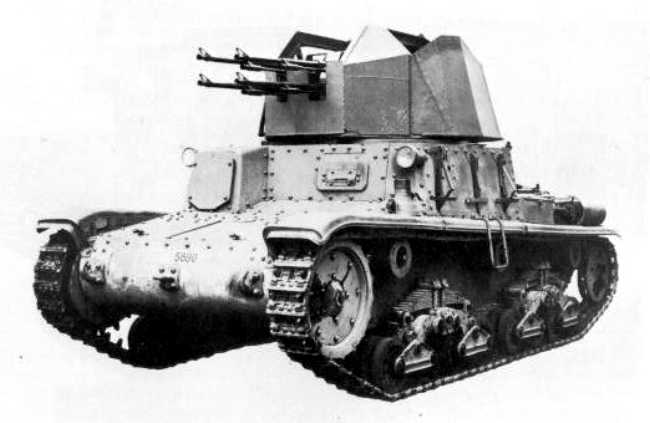
- Type: Self-propelled anti-aircraft weapon
- Place of origin: Kingdom of Italy

Service history
- In service: 1942−1945
- Used by: Italy; Italian Social Republic; Nazi Germany

Production history
- Designer: Ansaldo
- Designed: 1942
- Manufacturer: Fiat

Specifications
- Mass: 14.7 t (16.2 tons)
- Length: 4.92 m (16 ft 2 in)
- Width: 2.20 m (7 ft 3 in)
- Height: 2.55 m (8 ft 4 in)
- Crew: 3 (driver, gunner, and loader)
- Armour: 50 mm (2.0 in) frontal armour 42 mm (1.7 in) side armour
- Main armament: 4× Cannone-Mitragliera da 20/70 (Scotti)
- Engine: SPA petrol 192 hp
- Suspension: Two 4 wheel bogies, semi-elliptic leaf spring
- Maximum speed: 40 km/h (25 mph)

The Semovente da 20/70 quadruplo was an experimental self-propelled anti-aircraft weapon developed for the Italian Royal Army during World War II.

== Development ==
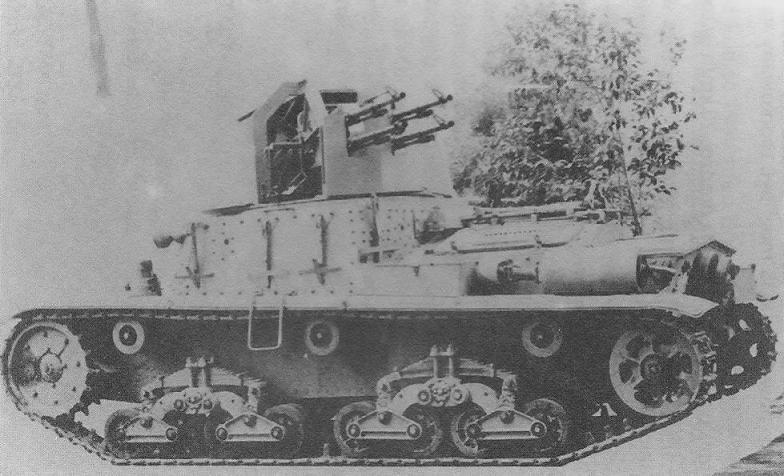
The semovente 20/70, captured by the Germans

During 1942 the Royal Italian Army had ordered the development of a self-propelled anti-aircraft weapon to be used in the North African theatre of operations and provide protection to mechanised columns, which were often the target of the Royal Air Force (RAF), without credible air defence.

To save time and materials, the hull of the M15/42 tank was used as the basis for the quadruplo: The original turret was removed and replaced with a polygonal welded open turret, containing quadruple 20 mm-Scotti Isotta Fraschini 20/70 guns, with -5° to + 90° elevation; the autocannon had been specially modified so they could use disintegrating link belt ammunition resulting in an increased rate of fire 600 rounds per minute per gun. The only other change involved the removal of the two Breda 38 machine guns in the hull, the openings for which were covered by 42 mm (1.7 in) armour plate; the crew was reduced to three, two in the turret and one in the driver position in the hull. The first prototype was completed by January/February 1943 and was presented for trials at the Centro Studi Motorizzazione dell'esercito: weighing 14.7 t (16.2 tons) at 2.55 m (8 ft 4 in) high, capable of operating up 60% slopes.

== Combat History ==
In March 1943 it entered in service as the M15 / 42 Carro contraereo and was issued to VIII Reggimento Autieri stationed at Cecchignola in Rome, where German forces captured it. Used on active service by the Germans, by April 1945 and it was operating under the V SS-Freiwilligen-Gebirgskorps, who fought the last battle against the Red Army in Germany, in the area of Teupitz.

Another source states that two prototypes were delivered: one of these was transported to Tunisia, where it was tested under actual combat conditions, remaining there after the surrender of the 1st Italian Army and the 5th Panzer Army in May 1943.
