= M11/39 tank =

Italian medium tank in World War II

Carro Armato M11/39
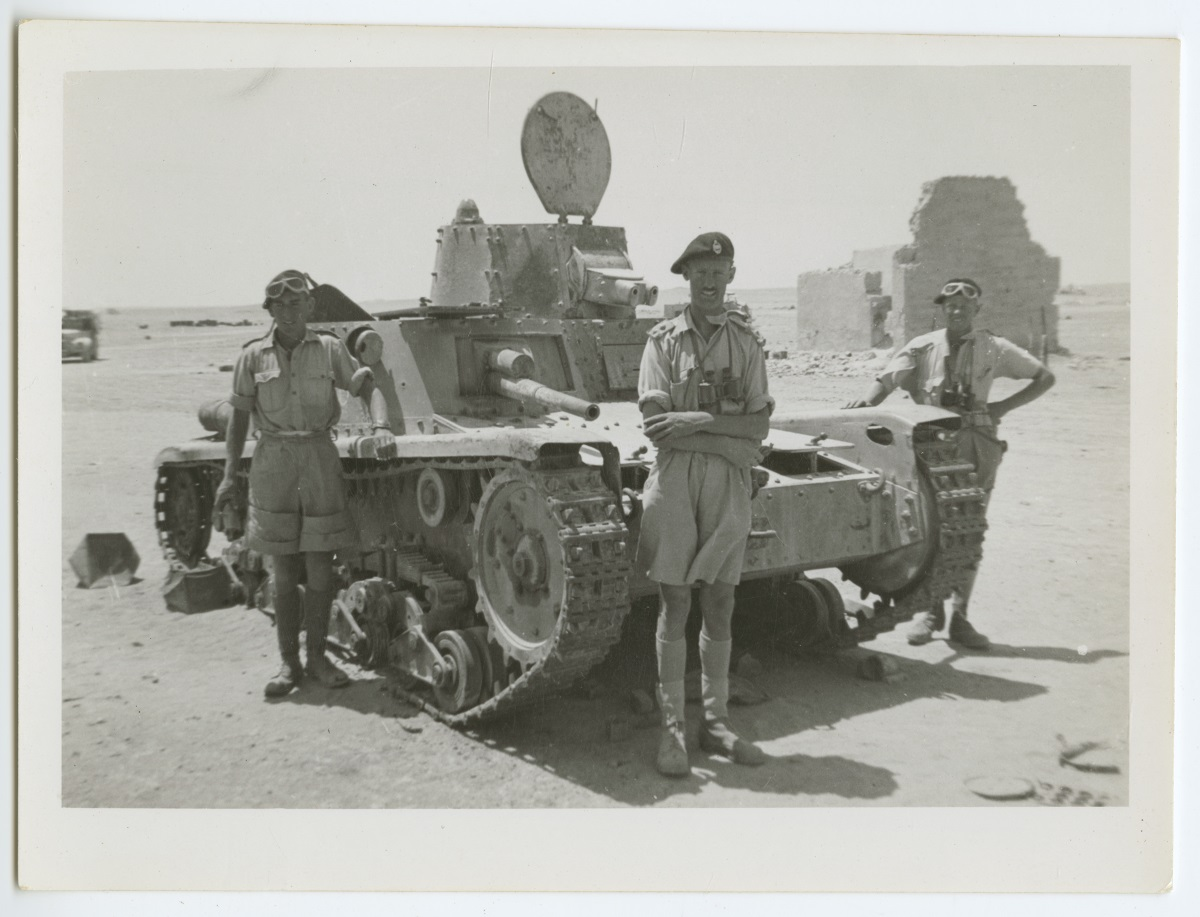
- British soldiers with a captured M11/39 near Sidi Barrani in August 1941
- Type: Medium tank
- Place of origin: Italy

Service history
- In service: 28 July 1939 – c. 1944.
- Used by: Italy; Italian Social Republic; Germany; Australia (captured); South Africa (captured)
- Wars: World War II

Production history
- Designed: c. 1937
- Manufacturer: Ansaldo
- Produced: c. January–June 1939
- No. built: 100 (96 operational tanks, 4 prototypes)
- Variants: M13/40, M14/41, M15/42

Specifications
- Mass: 11,175 kg (24,640 lb)
- Length: 4.7 m (15 ft 5 in)
- Width: 2.2 m (7 ft 2.5 in)
- Height: 2.3 m (7 ft 6.5 in)
- Crew: 3 (commander/radio operator, loader/gunner, driver)
- Armour: Front armour 30 mm (1.2 in); Side armour 14.5 mm (0.57 in); Top and floor armour 6 mm (0.24 in); Rear armour 8 mm (0.31 in); Turret armour 30 mm (1.2 in); Turret top armour 6 mm (0.24 in)
- Main armament: 37 mm Vickers-Terni L/40; 84 rounds
- Secondary armament: 2× 8 mm Breda 38 machine guns 2,808 rounds
- Engine: SPA 8T V-8 diesel 105 hp (78 kW)
- Power/weight: 9.5 hp (7.1 kW)/tonne
- Suspension: Two 4 wheel bogies, semi-elliptic leaf spring
- Operational range: 200 km (120 mi)
- Maximum speed: 32.2 km/h (20.0 mph) road

The Carro Armato M11/39 was an Italian medium tank first produced prior to World War II. The M11/39 saw service in Africa and Italy (1939–1944). The official Italian designation was Carro Armato (armoured vehicle) M11/39. The designation for the M11/39 is as follows: "M" for Medio ("medium"), followed by the weight in tonnes (11) and the year of adoption (1939).

== Development ==
The M11/39 was developed as a "breakthrough tank" (Carro di Rottura). The design of the M11/39 was influenced by the British Vickers 6-Ton. This influence is reflected particularly in the track and suspension design. A novelty of the design was the placement of the final reduction gears inside the front-mounted drive sprockets, eliminating the need for enlarged final drive housings in the bow armour. Service use of the M11/39 was short due to several deficiencies in its design, particularly the placement of the main 37 mm gun in the hull. The design concept was to use the main gun against other tanks and to defend the tank with the turret armament. The gun was in a fixed position with traverse restricted to 15° to port and starboard. Dual 8 mm machine guns were housed in a small rotating one-man turret, with manual controls.

The original intent was to place the 37 mm /L40 armament in the turret but there was insufficient space. The gun placement followed the French Char B1 and anticipated the early versions of the Churchill tanks, although in these tanks the hull guns were howitzers, rather than high-velocity guns. The M11/39 had other shortcomings: its endurance and performance were poor, it was relatively slow, it was mechanically unreliable and its 30 mm maximum riveted steel armour, designed to withstand 20 mm fire, was vulnerable to British 2-pounder guns at any range at which the M11/39s main gun was effective. The tank was designed to carry a radio but none were fitted to the production vehicles. The M11/39 hull was modified for use its successor the Fiat M13/40, which had the main gun in the turret; an order for 100 M11s was placed as a stop-gap.

== Units ==
Only two battalions received the M11/39 tank before production was switched to the better M13/40

- I Tank Battalion "M", 32nd Tank Infantry Regiment
- II Tank Battalion "M", 32nd Tank Infantry Regiment

Both battalions were sent to North Africa for the Italian invasion of Egypt and assigned for the campaign to the 4th Tank Infantry Regiment. The regiment and both battalions were destroyed during Operation Compass, with the last remnants extinguished during the Battle of Beda Fomm.

== Combat ==
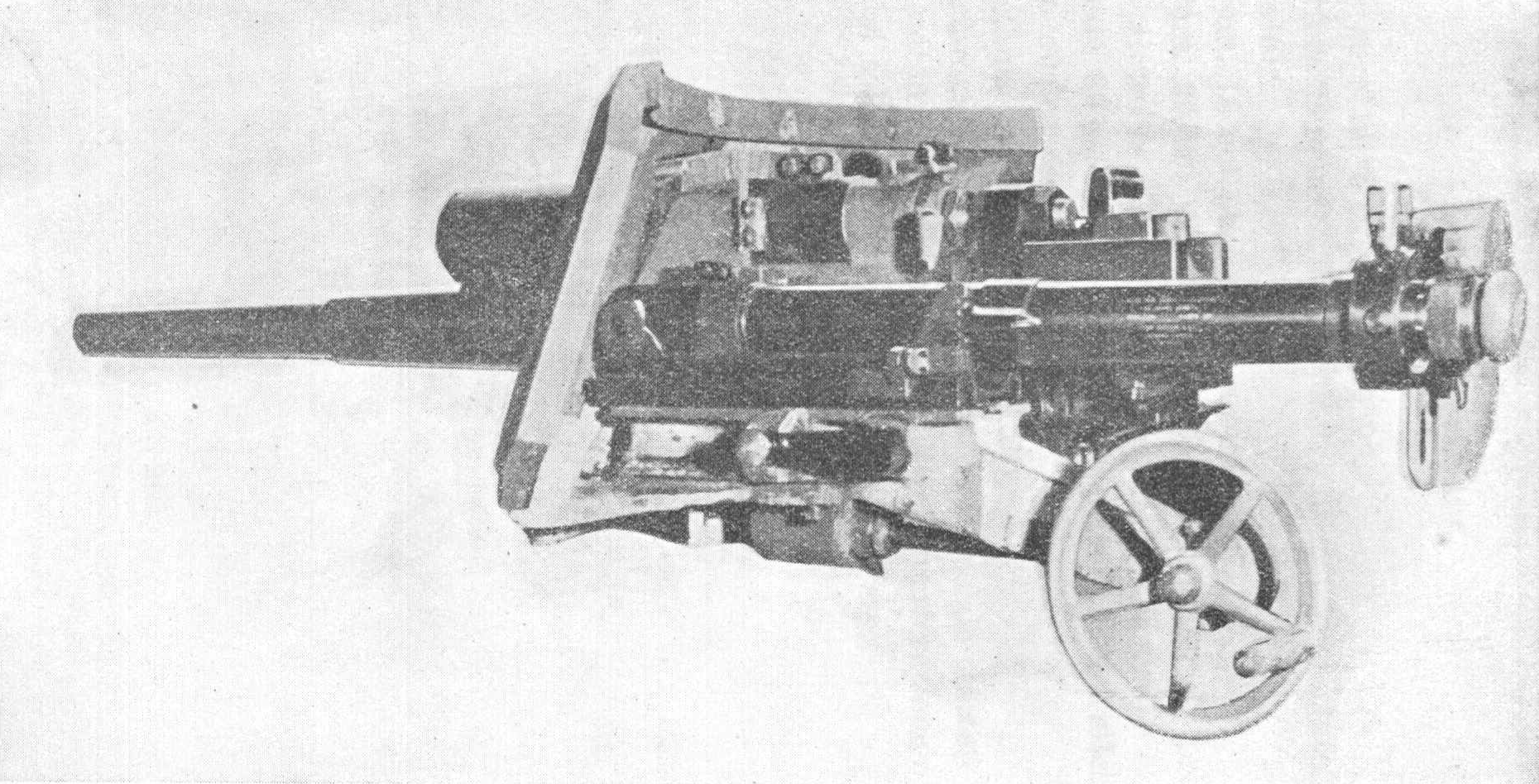
The Vickers-Terni Cannone da 37/40

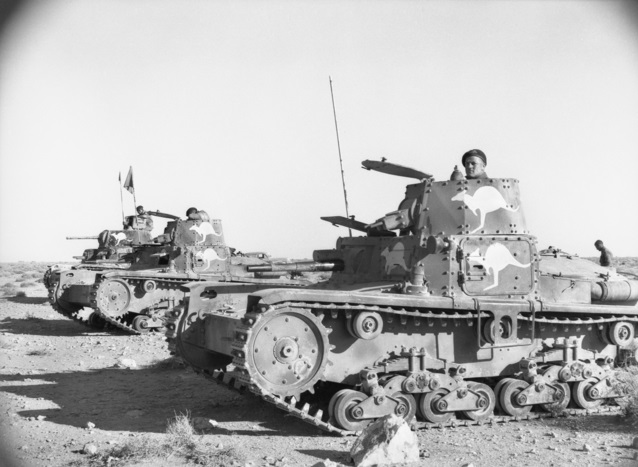
Two M11/39s (foreground) and an M13/40 captured by the Australians at Tobruk, January 1941

In Libya 72 × M11/39s were used in the North African Campaign, 24 operated in the East Africa Campaign and the first four prototypes remained in Italy. The M11 was vastly superior to the 36 × L3/33 and L3/35 tankettes stationed in East Africa. The M11/39 proved somewhat successful in early encounters with the British Light Tank Mk VI. The 37 mm gun of the M11 acted as a deterrent against attacks by these relatively fast but thin-skinned vehicles, armed only with machine guns. The tank was outclassed by heavier British cruiser and Infantry tanks, the Cruiser Mk II (A10), Cruiser Mk III (A13) and Matilda.

=== North Africa ===
On 13 September 1940, M11s participated in the Italian invasion of Egypt. On 9 December 1940, M11s also operated defensively in the opening stages of the British counter-offensive, Operation Compass. When Operation Compass was launched, many of the M11/39s were damaged, broken, or immobilized inside some of the static Italian positions. The British used Matilda tanks to overrun many of the Italian positions and the M11s could do little against the heavy armour of the Matildas. From 10 April 1941, during the siege of Tobruk, some captured M11s were employed by the 6th Australian Division Cavalry Regiment over some months. The Australians painted large white kangaroo symbols on the tanks and used the captured M11s, together with several M13s, until they ran out of diesel fuel. The tanks were then destroyed to deny them to the advancing Axis forces in the spring of 1941.

=== East Africa ===
In 1940, Italian East Africa received 24 M11/39s. In East Africa, the M11s fought as the only medium tank available to the Italians. On 3 August 1940, M11s participated in The Italian Invasion of British Somaliland. By January 1941, M11s were used on the defensive in Eritrea when the British launched their counter-offensive there. Unfortunately for the Italians, the British had a small number of Matilda tanks available to them during the Battle of Keren and this negated any value that the M11s may have added. By the end of May 1941, the Italian forces were defeated on the East African fronts where M11s were deployed. By the end of November, organized Italian resistance in East Africa was over. There is no indication that captured M11s were re-used by the captors in East Africa.

== See also ==
- Western Desert Campaign
