= M15/42 tank =

Italian medium tank of World War II

Carro Armato M15/42
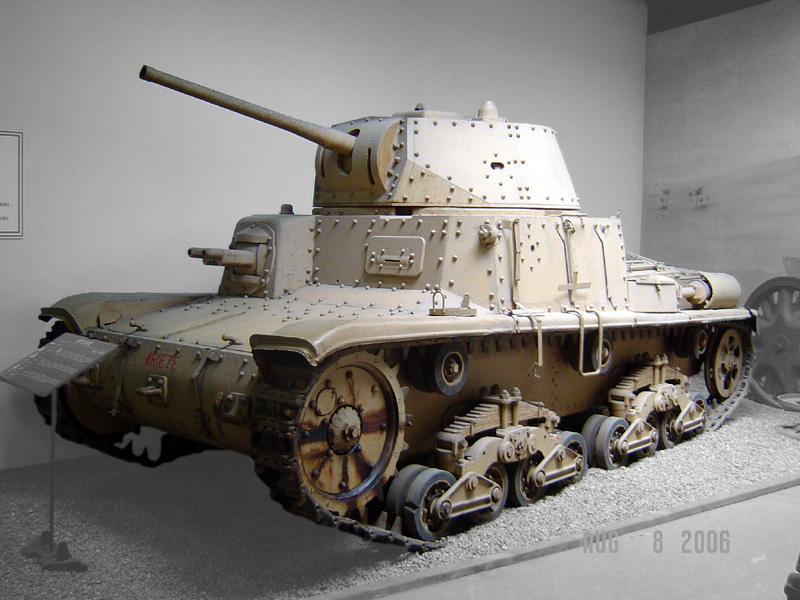
- Carro Armato M15/42 on display at the Musée des Blindés in Saumur
- Type: Medium Tank
- Place of origin: Kingdom of Italy

Service history
- In service: 1943–45
- Used by: Kingdom of Italy; Italian Social Republic; Nazi Germany
- Wars: World War II

Production history
- Designer: Ansaldo
- Designed: 1942
- Manufacturer: Ansaldo
- Produced: 1 January 1943 - post September 1943
- No. built: Disputed. 333 produced before and after the armistice according to Cappellano (including 85 command units) see production paragraph
- Variants: Command tank, Semovente 75/34, Semovente 75/46, Semovente 105/25 , Semovente da 20/70 quadruplo

Specifications
- Mass: 15.5 tonnes
- Length: 4.92 m (16 ft 2 in)
- Width: 2.20 m (7 ft 3 in)
- Height: 2.40 m (7 ft 10 in)
- Crew: 4 (commander, radio operator, driver, gunner/loader)
- Armour: 50 mm frontal armour 25 mm side armour
- Main armament: 47 mm / L40 gun 111 rounds
- Secondary armament: 3 × 8 mm Breda 38 machine guns
- Engine: SPA 15TB M42 petrol 11,980 cc V8 water cooled 192 hp/2,400 rpm
- Suspension: Two 4 wheel bogies, semi-elliptic leaf spring
- Operational range: 200 kilometres (120 miles)
- Maximum speed: 38 km/h (24 mph)

The Carro Armato M15/42 was the last Italian medium tank produced during World War II. It was based on the earlier M13/40 and M14/41 medium tanks, and was built with the lessons from the North African Campaign in mind. The tank was meant to be a stopgap until the heavier P26/40 tank could be produced in numbers. It did not serve in North Africa, the theatre in which it was intended to operate, but served in Italy and in Yugoslavia with the German Wehrmacht.

== Development ==
After witnessing the inadequacies of their M13/40 and M14/41 medium tanks, the Italian Army decided that they needed a stopgap design until the heavier P26/40 was ready for production. The M13/40 and M14/41, although comparable to most of their early British and Allied contemporaries, had several severe drawbacks which made them very unsuited for the deserts of North Africa. Moreover, their guns, although adequate against most medium tanks, could not penetrate the most heavily armoured British types being fielded in North Africa at the time.

In early 1941 the Italians attempted to create a tank, the M16/43 "Saharan Fast Medium Tank", based on the design of a captured British A15 Crusader tank. Although the prototype tank performed well in trials, the type was cancelled in 1943; by this time, Italy had lost its North African territories and no longer needed a fast tank built for the deserts of North Africa. During the development of this tank, the Germans offered both their Panzer III and Panzer IV medium tanks for licensed production, under the condition that they supply half the resources needed for production, and all of the guns and sights for the tank. The Italians, not wanting to hand their industries to the Germans, rejected the offer, deciding instead to settle on an improved version of their own M14/41.

This tank would be 12 centimetres longer than the original M14/41, and would mount a new gun originally meant for the M16/43, a new gasoline engine (the 12 litre 190 hp SPA 15TB M42, chosen due to a shortage of diesel fuel in Italy at the time) and a new drive. The vehicle, officially known as the Carro Armato M15/42 ("M" for medium tank, the weight in tonnes (15), and the year of adoption (1942)), incorporated improvements learned from the battles in North Africa; but development of the tank's main gun and ammunition meant that it could not enter production until 1 January 1943, when it was already obsolete.

The main armament consisted of an improved version of the 47 mm/L32 main gun, known as the 47 mm/L40. It was mounted in a fully rotating, electrically driven turret, and had an elevation of 20 degrees, and a depression of 10 degrees. The gun was capable of firing hollow charge, high explosive, and armour piercing rounds. The secondary armament consisted of five Breda 38 machine guns (two mounted in the hull, another two in a coaxial mount, and the fifth on top of the tank in an anti-aircraft mount.)

=== Production ===
Nicola Pignato in his work quotes 180 tanks registered with their respective license plates before the armistice. A study, written by Davide Guglielmi and published in the bimonthly magazine Storia Militare, talks about 124 tanks captured by the German armed forces and 28 more produced during 1944. The total, therefore, would amount to 152 units. Cappellano on publication number 6 of 2013 of the same journal recorded different production statistics. His study was based on an original Ansaldo document. In addition to the prototype dating back to 1941, there are reported 103 vehicles assembled in 1942 and 36 in the first quarter of 1943, plus 80 planned up to 31 December 1943; however it is not known if this last quote was reached. Furthermore, the study does not mention the M15/42 produced after the Italian capitulation. In later publications, Cappellano would list production numbers as 220 before the armistice, with an additional 28 tanks built post armistice. Cappellano also sites a total of 85 command units built before and after the armistice.

== Combat use ==
Italy began producing the M15/42 on 1 January 1943, and by mid-1943 had produced about 90. After the armistice of Cassibile on 8 September 1943, Italian formations from the 135th Armored Cavalry Division "Ariete" fought against German troops moving to disarm them in Rome. The M15/42s were among the tanks they used in this battle.

After the armistice, Germany confiscated all remaining M15/42s. Under the Germans, an additional 28 incomplete M15/42s were produced. In German service, the M15/42 fought mostly in Yugoslavia, with 85 tanks being stationed there by December 1944.

== Variants ==
=== M.42 command tank ===
The M15/42 served as the basis for the design of the "M42 Self-Propelled Command tank", intended to serve in departments equipped with self-propelled guns. The turret was removed and the rolling ring closed with an 8 mm thick armored plate, in which two doors were obtained; on the roof was mounted a Breda Mod. 38 of 8 mm in anti-aircraft function. The two Breda Mod. 38 in the casemate were instead replaced by a single Breda Mod. 31 of 13.2 mm and two Magneti Marelli radios, an RF1 CA and an RF2 CA and two extra batteries were placed in the hull; finally a rangefinder was installed. The M42 was produced in 45 units in 1943. A small number was captured by Germany, which placed them in service under the designation Panzerbefehlswagen M42 772 (i): they were employed in the Italian war theater until the end of hostilities.

=== Self-propelled guns ===
The M15/42 served as a basis for the development of various self-propelled guns: the Semovente 75/34, Semovente 75/46 and the Semovente 105/25 A prototype self-propelled anti-aircraft gun carrying four 20 mm Scotti-Isotta Fraschini anti-aircraft guns in a lightly armoured turret, based on the M15/42, was produced in 1943. After the armistice the Germans captured this vehicle, and may have used it as a model for their self-propelled anti-aircraft guns, derived from the Panzer IV medium tank (Flakpanzer IV).
