= Carro Armato P.43 =

P43
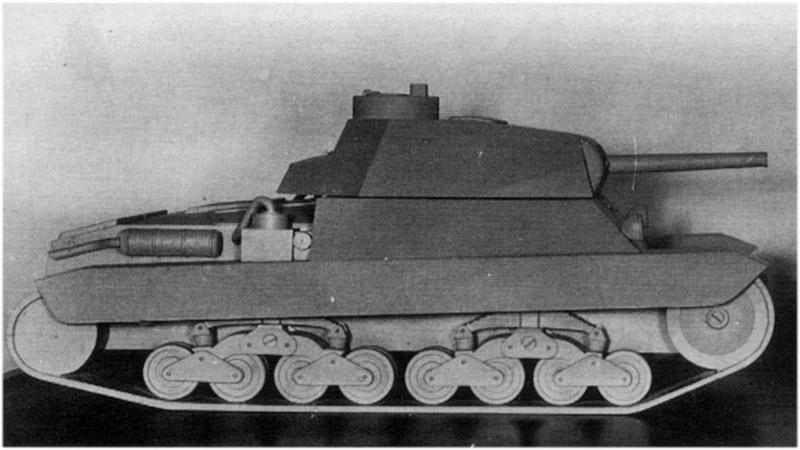
- Wooden model of P43
- Type: Heavy tank
- Place of origin: Italy

Production history
- Designed: April 1943

Specifications
- Mass: Over 29 tonnes (33 short tons)
- Length: 8.16 m (26 ft 9 in)
- Width: 3.04 m (10 ft 0 in)
- Height: 2.24 m (7 ft 4 in)
- Crew: 5
- Armor: 80-100 mm (frontal) 50mm (lateral)
- Main armament: 1x Ansaldo Cannone da 90/42 (?) 64 rounds
- Engine: V12 Diesel; 420 hp
- Power/weight: 14 hp/t
- Maximum speed: 40 km/h (25 mph)

The P.43 was a proposed Italian heavy tank designed in April 1943. It was created as a direct continuation and replacement to the P26/40 tank; however only a prototype was manufactured at the end of the summer of 1943. The official Italian designation was carro armato ("armoured vehicle") P.43. The designation "P" means pesante ("heavy").

== Features ==
The P43 or P 30/43 was developed by FIAT and Ansaldo simultaneously with the P26/40, of which it was supposed to be a heavier version. The vehicle was planned to have weighed at least 30 tons and would have mounted an engine of 420 hp. The gun was the same as the P.26 - the 75/34 mm cannon. While it was still in the design phase, it was proposed to use the 90/42 gun derived from anti-aircraft Cannone da 90/53, or the 105/25 mm cannon mounted on the Semovente da 105/25 instead.

== P43 bis ==
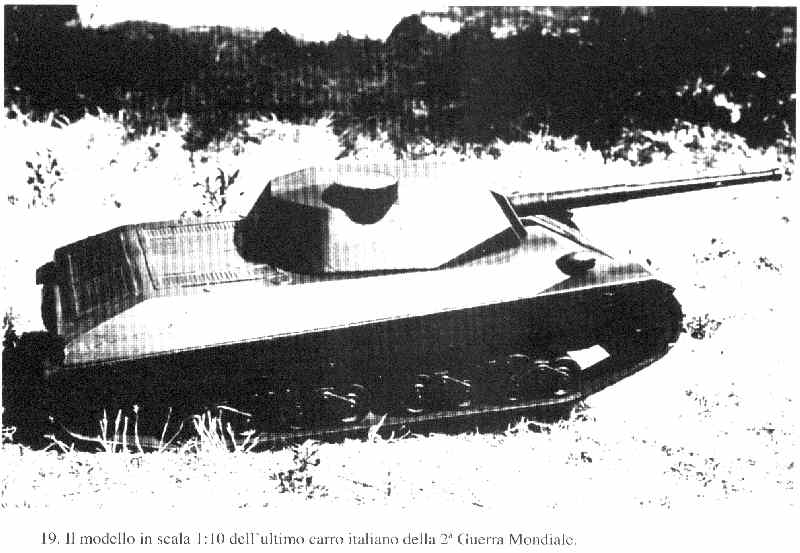
Model of P43 bis

A photograph of the P43 as a wooden mockup exists along with other models of P40 and P43 bis, 30 tons with cannon that looks like it could be a lighter version of the 90/53 piece. In the same picture, there is a model of a German Panther version slightly smaller equipped with what appears to be a 90/53 cannon. It is possible that the German part stigmatized the P43 as a plagiarism of the Panther tank (that Italy had received blueprints for the production in license). It seems that this model has received the abbreviation P43 bis (perhaps for the observed inability to quickly get to the production of the P43 with a piece of 90 mm cannon).

This overlap of studies can be originated either by news from the Russian front on the new Soviet medium tank T-34/85 of 32 tons and with 85 mm cannon (derived from the anti-aircraft gun) or by the availability of data and drawings of the German Panther.

According to various publications the engines were listed as:

- P26/40 diesel engine of 330 HP then replaced in production for one to 420 HP gasoline.
- P30/43 or P43 420/430 HP V12 diesel engine.
- P.43 bis (gun 90/42 mm) the same engine 420/430 HP.
- P.35/43 or second P43 bis (Panther reduction) of 35 tons with gun 90/53 or 90/42 mm and 470/480 HP engine copied from the engine of the Soviet T-34.

Frontal protection of 80/100 mm would guarantee equal performance with the vehicles designed by other nations, such as the Soviet IS-2 of 46 tons (which was 122 mm), the Tiger I of 57 tons and higher than the Panther of 45 tons, which was 80 mm.

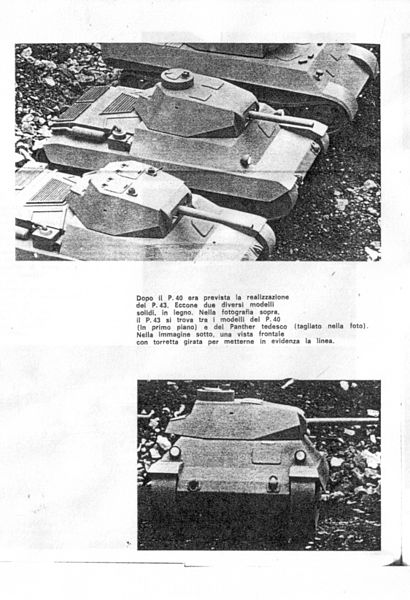
The front of the P43 can be seen in the second picture

However the P43 saw only a prototype stage in 1943.

The P43 was the pinnacle of Italian tank design during WW2. The Italians goal with this vehicle was to create a somewhat equivalent of the Panther and Tiger tanks used by their allies. This tank’s design was obviously a natural progression of the P40. The tank only reached the wooden mock-up stage. However, the proposed armaments for the tank did exist in sufficient numbers. Two cannons were looked for the tank as its main armament. The first was the 90/53 mod.41 cannon already found on the M41M. The second was the 105/25 M43 cannon found on the M43. A lightened version of the 90mm was chosen to be used as it had better anti tank performance and was a lighter overall. This likely would have similar penetration values as the current SPG, with its best round at point blank range penetrating 158mm of armor. The engine used was a similar design to the P40, but was the 420HP SPA 8 cylinder diesel engine. This was to be used with the same suspension design used on the P40 and M43 vehicles. The frontal armor of the vehicle was said to be 80-100mm thick and 50mm on the sides. It is likely that 80mm thick sloped on the front to conserve weight as the vehicle was proposed to weigh 33 tons. This weight and engine power gives it a ratio of 12.7 HP per ton. Using the same track width as the P40, one would expect similar mobility. The Italian army and authorities ordered 150 units of P43 heavy tanks to be produced before June 1944, while at the same time the number of P40 tanks was reduced from 1200 to only 500 units because the P40 tank was considered to be obsolete.

== See also ==
- German Panther medium/heavy tank
- German Tiger I heavy tank
- Hungarian 44M Tas medium/heavy tank
- Italian P26/40 medium/heavy tank
- United States M26 Pershing medium/heavy tank

== Bibliography ==
- Filippo Cappellano & Pier Paolo Battistelli, Italian Medium Tanks 1939–45, Osprey Publishing, 1998
- Cesare Falessi, Benedetto Pafi, Veicoli da combattimento dell'Esercito Italiano dal 1939 al 1945, Intyrama books, 1976.
- Ralph A. Riccio, Nicola Pignato, Marcello Calzolari; Carri Armati e Veicoli da Combattimento Italiani della Seconda Guerra Mondiale, 2010
