= Cannone-Mitragliera da 20/70 (Scotti) =

Italian World War II autocannon series

Cannone-Mitragliera Scotti da 20/70
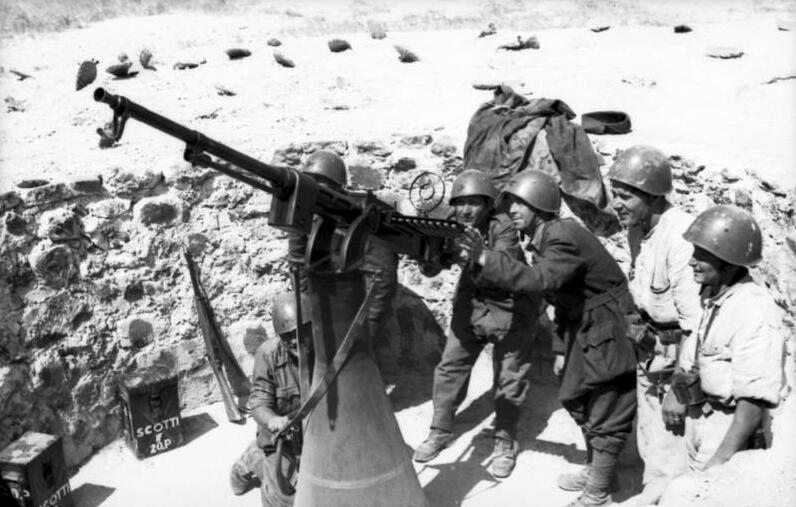
- 20/70 Scotti Mod. 39 on pedestal mount
- Type: Autocannon
- Place of origin: Italy

Service history
- In service: 1938−1950s
- Used by: See § Users
- Wars: World War II

Production history
- Designer: Alfredo Scotti
- Manufacturer: Isotta Fraschini; Oerlikon; Officine Meccaniche; Grandi
- Variants: See § Variants

Specifications (Scotti 20/70 Mod. 38)
- Mass: 227.5 kg (502 lb)
- Barrel length: 1.54 m (5.05 ft); L/70
- Shell: HE, Tracer
- Shell weight: 125 g (4.4 oz)
- Caliber: 20×138mmB
- Action: Delayed blowback
- Elevation: -10° / +85°
- Traverse: 360°
- Rate of fire: 230 rpm
- Muzzle velocity: 830 m/s (2,720 ft/s)
- Effective firing range: 2,135 m (2,330 yd)
- Feed system: 12-round strips

The Scotti 20/70 (Cannone-Mitragliera Scotti da 20/70) was a series of 20 mm (0.79 in) autocannons used by Italy during World War II, firing the 20x138mmB cartridge. While it was primarily used on the defense of airfields and other strategic positions, it was also mounted on ships and some submarines to make up for the shortage of its competitor, the Breda 20/65 mod.35.

== Background ==
In the late 1920s, Alfredo Scotti designed a delayed blowback action for automatic weapons. Several different guns were designed and built, but ultimately only the 20/70 series would see military service. In 1932, Oerlikon obtained the rights of producing the Scotti for the export market, while Isotta Fraschini was responsible to produce the gun in Italy, though other companies such as Officine Meccaniche (OM) and Grandi would also build it. The Scotti prototypes used several different cartridges (including a proprietary design) and were fed with drum or box magazines, but in order to compete with the Breda 20/65 mod.35, the 20x138mmB cartridge and a feed system using 12-round ammunition strips were ultimately chosen.

== Design ==
The Scotti originally used a 60-round drum that was eventually discarded in favor of 12-round trays for the ammunition. Compared to the Breda, the Scotti was a far simpler weapon. It resembles the Oerlikon in some respects, but uses a different mechanism. The Scotti uses a delayed blowback action with a rotating bolt head to lock the breech which is then unlocked by a gas piston system while the expanding gases ejects the spent cases. Due the lack of primary extraction, the cartridges need to be lubricated to ensure a smooth process. The gun is fired from an open bolt to improve air cooling.

The Scotti was easier to manufacture and lighter than the Breda, but despite using a longer barrel, the former's overall performance was inferior. The same ammunition type was used, but the effective ceiling was lower (perhaps due to a different propellant charge). To compensate for it, the rate of fire was higher. According to British reports, the high-explosive (HE) round was rather ineffective, producing very little splinter effect, while the tracer round could be easily observed at any range. The Scotti took longer to employ than the 40 mm Bofors, but it had the advantages of being simple to build and operate. It was also convenient to manhandle and conceal.

Semi-mobile versions that could be carried on trucks and dismounted for use and fixed versions were built for the Army, Air Force, and Navy. Once off the trucks, the first version could be manhandled into position on its two-wheel carriage, although in action the gun rested on a flat tripod mounting. The second version was static on a pedestal mount, and was mainly used in defense of the Italian homeland. Naval versions of the Scotti were mounted of surface ships and some submarines, due the shortages of Bredas. These can be distinguished from the latter by the gas tube under the barrel, which extended further forward.

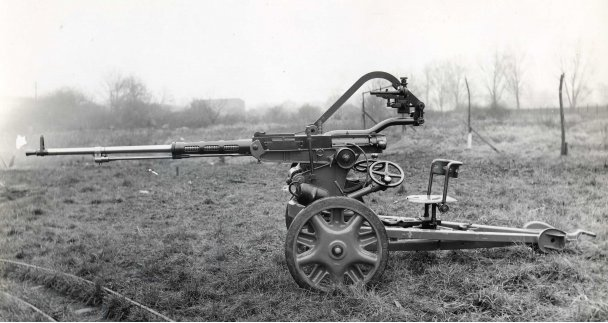
Semi-mobile version on a wheeled carriage

Comparison between the Breda and Scotti
	Breda 20/65 Mod. 35	Scotti 20/70 Mod. 38
Barrel length	65 calibers	70 calibers
Muzzle velocity	840 m/s (2,750 ft/s)	830 m/s (2,720 ft/s)
Maximum horizontal range	5,500 m (6,000 yd)	5,400 m (5,900 yd)
Maximum effective ceiling	2,500 m (8,200 ft)	2,100 m (7,000 ft)
Weight of projectile (HE)	0.135 kg (.297 lb)	0.125 kg (.275 lb)
Cyclic rate of fire	220 rounds per minute	230 rounds per minute
Practical rate of fire	120 rounds per minute	120 rounds per minute
Weight in action	307 kg (677 lb)	227 kg (501 lb)

== Variants ==
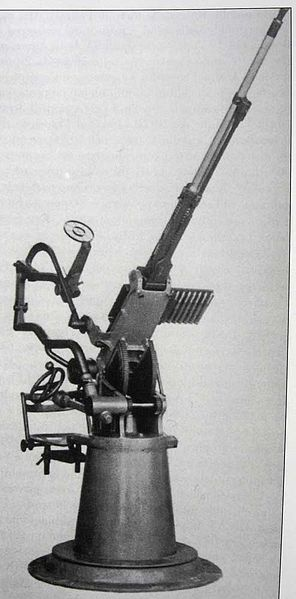
Scotti-Isotta Fraschini 20/70 single-barrel naval mounting.

- Scotti 20/70 − Prototype built by Grandi in 1932, it used a double-drum magazine and was chambered for the proprietary 20×110 mm Scotti cartridge. In 1935, single and twin-barrel versions were built: these could accept either drum or box magazines
- Scotti 20/70 Mod. 38 − First production model
- Scotti 20/70 Mod. 39 − Anti-aircraft gun mounted on a fixed pedestal
- Scotti 20/70 Mod. 41 − AA gun mounted on a two-wheeled carriage, it could be carried on trucks and after being dismounted it rested on a tripod mounting for combat.
- Scotti-Isotta-Fraschini 20/70 Mod. 39 − Naval variant, it was originally a twin-barreled gun mounted on a modified Breda mount, but later a single-barrel version was also employed on several ships
- Scotti-OM 20/70 Mod. 41 − Single-barrel deck gun mounted on Romolo-class and some Flutto-class submarines
- Semovente da 20/70 quadruplo − Self-propelled quadruple mounting
- Autocannone da 20/70 su ALFA Romeo 430RE − Single-barrel Scotti 20/70 Mod. 39 mounted on an ALFA Romeo 430RE truck.

== Operational history ==
The Scotti was alongside the Breda the standard Italian light anti-aircraft gun during WWII. According to Williams, the Army and Navy had about 300 guns in service, while the Air Force also used some guns for protecting its airfields. The Navy made use of single and twin mounts in surface ships (alongside the Breda, Oerlikon, and the Flakvierling 38) and disappearing mounts in submarines. According to British reports, it was inferior to the Bofors 40 mm gun, with multiple aircraft managing to return to base even after being hit multiple times. It was estimated that two Scottis were needed to protect an area as opposed to a single Bofors.

The Scotti design was reportedly exported in small quantities to South American countries and China, but Williams stated that these were actually aircraft-mounted guns. During the German invasion of the Netherlands in 1940, the defending forces used two Scottis alongside some Škoda 75 mm AA guns and a dozen machine guns in an attempt to prevent the Waalhaven airfield from being captured.

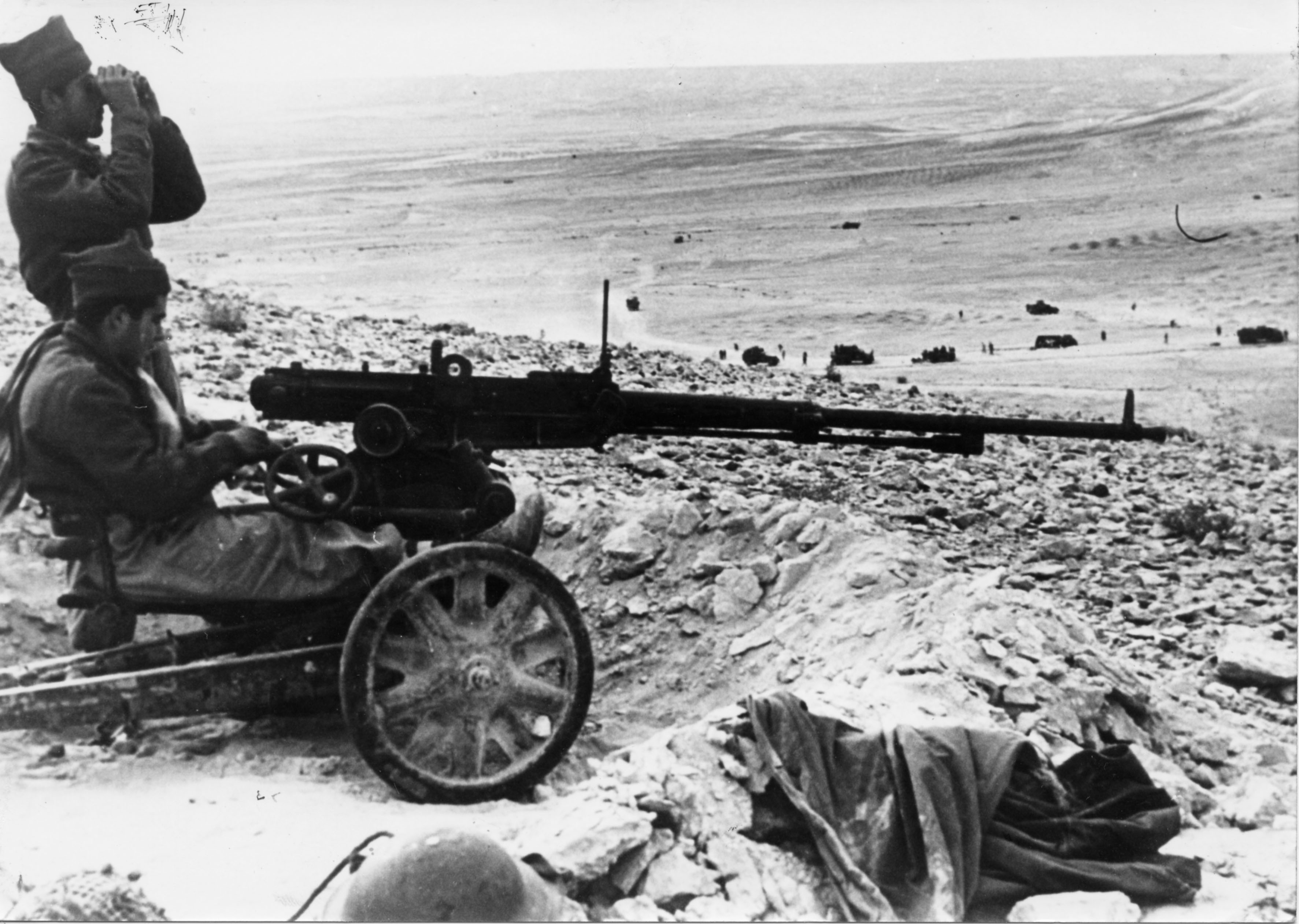
Scotti 20/70 in Israeli service.

After 1942, the ease of fabrication led to an increase in production totals, but the type never seriously challenged the number of Bredas in service. In the North African campaign many Scottis were also used by the Afrika Korps under the designation 2 cm Scotti (i). After the Italians surrendered in 1943, several guns were captured by the Germans and used in counter-insurgent operations against the Yugoslav partisans. A number of these were also taken over by British troops for local defence of coastal artillery positions to help alleviate their shortages of Oerlikons. Production continued in the Italian Social Republic to supply the German Army and after 1945, the Scotti was used for a number of years by the reconstituted Italian army.

== Users ==
- Nazi Germany − Designated as the 2 cm Scotti (i)
- Kingdom of Italy
- Netherlands
- United Kingdom − Limited use of captured weapons

== See also ==
- List of autocannon

=== Weapons of comparable role, performance and era ===
- Cannone-Mitragliera da 20/65 (Breda)
- 20 mm Polsten
- Madsen 20 mm cannon
- 25 mm automatic air defense gun M1940 (72-K)
- 25 mm Hotchkiss anti-aircraft gun
