= Semovente da 75/46 =

Semovente da 75/46 Sturmgeschütz M 43 mit 75/46 (852) (i)
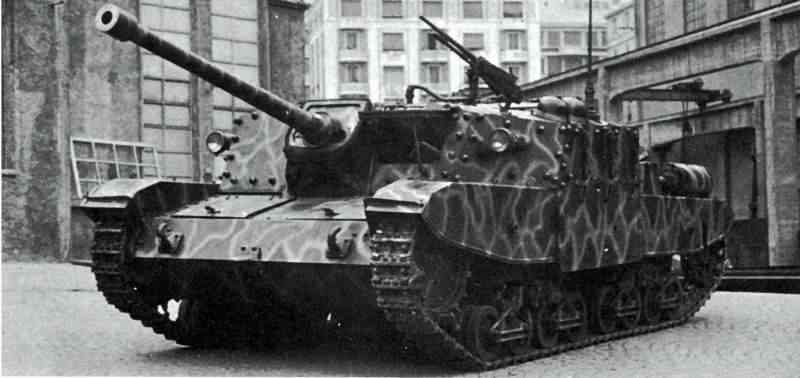
- The Semovente da 75/46 prototype
- Type: Tank destroyer
- Place of origin: Italian Social Republic

Service history
- Used by: Nazi Germany
- Wars: World War II

Production history
- Manufacturer: Ansaldo
- Produced: 1944-45
- No. built: 11–13

Specifications
- Length: 7.28 m (23 ft 11 in) overall
- Width: 2.88 m (9 ft 5 in)
- Crew: 3 (commander/gunner, driver, loader/radio operator)
- Armour: max 75 mm (3.0 in)
- Main armament: 75 mm (3.0 in) L46 gun
- Secondary armament: 8 mm Breda 38 machine gun with 500 rounds
- Engine: SPA 15TB M-15 diesel V8 water cooled
- Payload capacity: 43 rounds
- Suspension: vertical volute spring

The Semovente da 75/46 was an Italian tank destroyer in service during late World War II. A derivative of the Semovente da 105/25 self-propelled gun, it was produced in very few numbers and used by Nazi Germany in the Italian campaign.

== Development ==
After the armistice of Cassibile signed in September 1943, Northern and Central Italy fell under German control. In 1944 the progress of the war led them to order a new Italian armoured vehicle for a tank-fighting role, based on the Semovente da 105/25 self-propelled gun. The result was the Semovente da 75/46, which was named Sturmgeschütz M 43 mit 75/46 (852) (i) by the Germans, following their naming convention.

The 75/46 shared the same "M 43" hull of the Semovente da 105/25. However, the 105 mm L25 howitzer was replaced by a long Cannone da 75/46 C.A. modello 34 – originally conceived as an anti-aircraft gun but also used as an anti-tank gun – which gave a higher muzzle velocity (750 m/s instead of 510) and a far greater effective range, being able to fire a 6.5 kg (14 lb 5 oz) shell up to 13,000 m (43,000 ft) away. This gun could be loaded with HE or armour-piercing rounds; when loaded with the latter, it could penetrate up to 90 mm (3.5 in) of armour from 500 m (1,600 ft).
The other main difference with its precursor was in the overall increased armour: sloped plates were applied to the casemate and others were added on the sides, above the tracks. Due to these features and despite its origins, the 75/46 is considered a tank destroyer in every respect.

== Production ==
Between 1944 and the end of World War II in Italy, Ansaldo managed to assemble only 11 or 13 vehicles, all deployed exclusively by the Wehrmacht. Their standard camouflage, applied just after assembly, was Saharan Khaki background with reddish-brown and gray-green patches.
