= M13/40 tank =

Italian World War II medium tank

Carro Armato M13/40
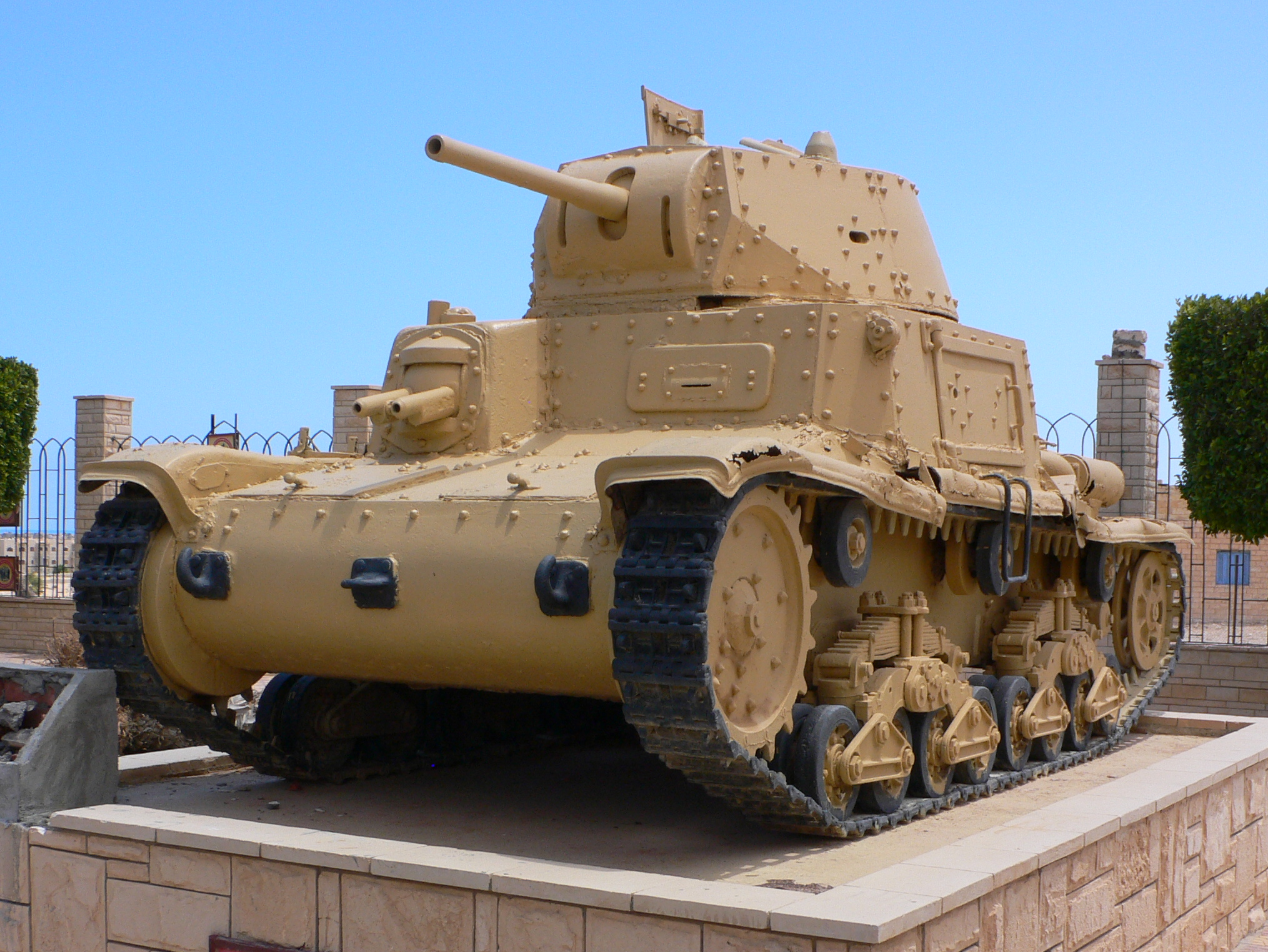
- M13/40 at the El Alamein War Museum
- Type: Medium tank
- Place of origin: Kingdom of Italy

Service history
- In service: 8 July 1940–1948
- Used by: Kingdom of Italy; Nazi Germany; Australia; United Kingdom; Kingdom of Egypt
- Wars: World War II; 1948 Arab-Israeli War

Production history
- Designed: 26 October 1939
- Manufacturer: Ansaldo
- Produced: July 1940 to late 1941
- No. built: 740
- Variants: M14/41, M15/42

Specifications
- Mass: 14 t (31,000 lb)
- Length: 4.915 m (16 ft 1.5 in)
- Width: 2.280 m (7 ft 5.8 in)
- Height: 2.370 m (7 ft 9.3 in)
- Crew: 4 (commander, radio operator, gunner, driver)
- Armour: Front: 30 mm (1.2 in); Sides/rear: 25 mm (0.98 in); Floor/roof: 6–14 mm (0.24–0.55 in); Turret front: 42 mm (1.7 in)
- Main armament: 1 × 47 mm cannone da 47/32 anti-tank gun 104 rounds
- Secondary armament: 4 × 8 mm Breda mod. 38 machine guns (1 × coaxial, 1 × AA, 2 × in hull); 2,808 rounds
- Engine: SPA 8 T M40 11,140 cc V8 Diesel engine 125 hp (93 kW)
- Suspension: Semi-elliptic leaf springs
- Ground clearance: 41 cm (16 in)
- Operational range: 200 km (120 mi)
- Maximum speed: 31.8 km/h (19.8 mph) on road

The Carro Armato M13/40 was an Italian tank designed to replace the M11/39 in the Royal Italian Army at the start of World War II. It was the primary tank used by the Italians throughout the war. The design was influenced by the British Vickers 6-Ton and was based on the modified chassis of the earlier M11/39. Production of the M11/39 was cut short in order to produce the M13/40. The name refers to "M" for Medio (medium) according to the Italian tank weight standards at the time, 13 tonnes was the scheduled weight and 1940 the initial year of production.

== Specifications ==
The M13 was constructed of bolted steel plates as follows: 30 mm front (as the M11), 42 mm on turret front (30 mm for the M11), 25 mm on the sides (the M11 had only 15 mm), 6 mm bottom (making it very vulnerable to mines) and 15 mm on top. While some plates on the engine compartment were riveted. The crew of four were housed in a forward fighting compartment, with the engine at the rear and transmission at the front. The driver and machine-gunner/radio operator were in the hull, with the commander/gunner and the loader in the turret.

The Vickers-derived running gear had two bogie trucks with eight pairs of small wheels on each side, using leaf-spring suspension. The tracks were conventional skeleton steel-plate links, and were relatively narrow. Together, this system was thought to allow good mobility in the mountainous areas in which future combat was expected. In the desert where most M13s were actually employed, mobility was less satisfactory. The tank was powered by a 125 hp (93 kW) diesel engine. This was an innovation that many countries had yet to introduce, as diesel engines were the future for tanks, with lower cost, greater range and reduced danger of fire compared to petrol engines.

The tank's main armament was a 47 mm gun, a tank mounted version of the successful Cannone da 47/32 M35 anti-tank gun. It could pierce about 45 mm (1.8 in) of armour at 500 m (550 yd); this was sufficient to penetrate the British light and cruiser tanks it faced in combat, though not the heavier infantry tanks. One hundred and four rounds of mixed armour-piercing and high explosive ammunition were carried. The M13 was also armed with three or four machine-guns: one coaxially with the main gun and two in the forward, frontal ball mount. A fourth machine gun was sometimes carried in a flexible mount on the turret roof for anti-aircraft use. Two periscopes were available for the gunner and commander, and a Magneti Marelli RF1CA radio was also fitted as standard equipment.

== Operational use ==
The M13/40 was used in the 1940 Greco-Italian War and 1941 and in the North African campaign. The M13/40 was not used on the Eastern Front; Italian forces there were equipped only with L6/40s and Semovente 47/32s. Beginning in 1942, the Italian Army recognised the firepower weakness of the M13/40 series and employed the Semovente 75/18 self-propelled gun alongside the tanks in their armoured units.

=== First actions ===
The first of over 700 M13/40s were delivered following a rate of production of about 60–70 a month, before the fall of 1940. They were sent to North Africa; however, most units were hastily formed (and thus lacked cohesion), the tanks had not been fitted with radios (giving them a serious tactical disadvantage even against inferior enemies) and their crews had almost no training (in 1940 the crews were given 25 days of actual tank training and then sent to the front). The baptism of fire came with a special unit, the Babini Group. Arriving too late to fight in the Italian invasion of Egypt, this unit was ready the next December, for Operation Compass, a British-led offensive. Tanks of III battalion were present at the Battle of Bardia, where in two days of fighting (January 3–4, 1941) attacking Australian forces suffered 456 casualties while the Italians lost 40,000 men (2,000 killed, 3,000 wounded and 36,000 captured). Further action took place in Derna, where the V battalion had just arrived. On February 6–7, the offensive penetrated so far that the Babini Group sought to open a breach in the Allied lines at the Battle of Beda Fomm in an effort to allow cut-off Italian troops to retreat along the Libyan coast. The attacks failed and all of their tanks were lost. The last six surviving tanks entered a field near the local British command post. They were destroyed one after another by a single 2-pounder (40 mm) anti-tank gun. Many tanks were lost in this campaign to artillery fire rather than other tanks. A number of captured M11 and M13 tanks were re-used by the Australian 2/6th Cavalry Regiment and the British 6th Royal Tank Regiment, until the spring of 1941, when their fuel ran out and they were destroyed.

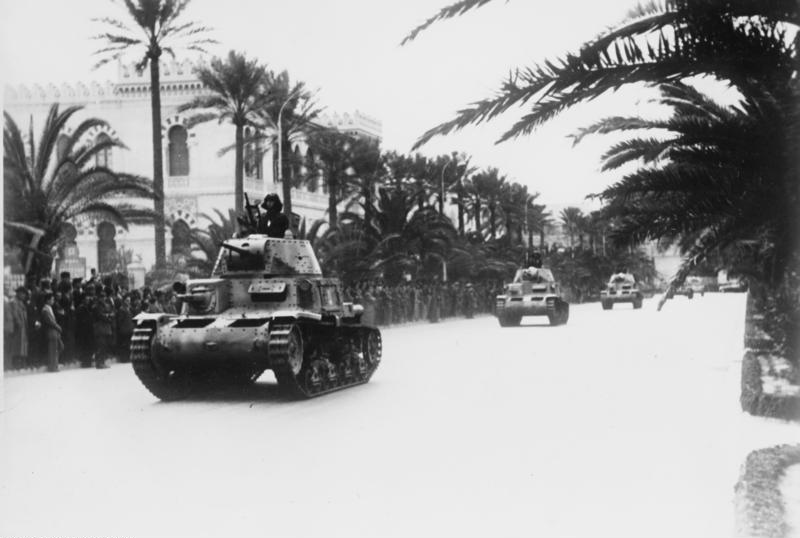
Italian M13/40 tanks on the streets of Tripoli, March 1941

The M13 also fought in Greece, in difficult terrain and in April 1941, M13s of the 132nd Armoured Division Ariete took part in the Siege of Tobruk, with little success against British Matilda II tanks. Ariete had more success with the M13 in the action at Bir el Gubi against the Crusader tanks of the British 22nd Armoured Brigade.

=== Later use in the desert war ===
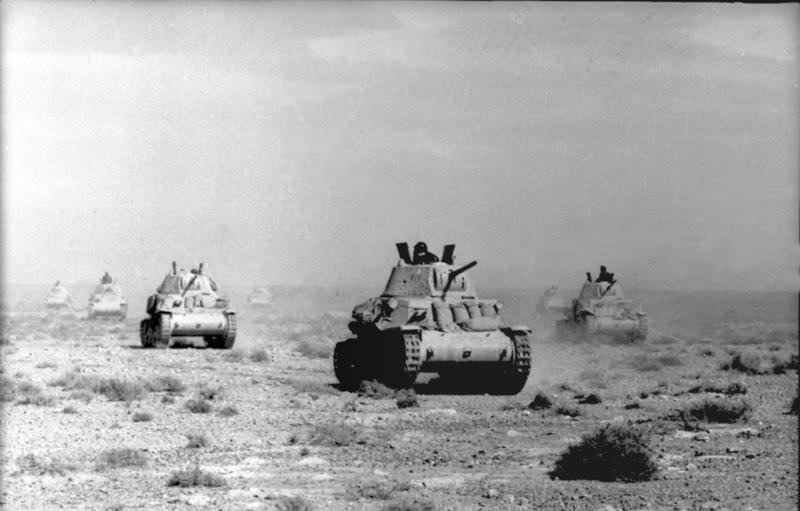
M13/40 tanks advancing across the desert, April 1941

In April 1941, at the time of the arrival of the Afrika Korps, the Italians had around 240 M13 and M14 tanks in first-line service. The first large-scale successful use of the M13 came in late 1941 during Operation Crusader, there they destroyed the 2nd New Zealand Division at the battle of Point 175, destroyed some tanks at the battle of Totensonntag, M13 also obtained a large victory at the defence of Bir El Gubi. In 1942, as the Allies began to deploy M3 Lee/Grant medium tanks and Crusader Mk IIIs, along with towed 6-pounder (57 mm) anti-tank guns in their infantry units, the weaknesses of the M13 were exposed. In an attempt to improve protection, many crews piled sandbags or extra track links on the outside of their tanks, but this made the already-underpowered vehicles even slower and increased maintenance requirements; such practice, while popular, was discouraged by the commanders for the same reason. While the tank became obsolescent in early 1942, it did perform decently, at Gazala they destroyed the 3rd Indian Motor Brigade and at Knightsbridge during the same battle, together with Semoventi 75/18 M40 they destroyed two dozen allied tanks between Grants and Stuarts. The Italians equipped at least one company in each tank battalion with more heavily armed Semovente 75/18 assault guns.

The Second Battle of El Alamein saw the first appearance of the M4 Sherman, while some 230 M13s were still in front line service. In several days of battle, the Ariete and Littorio divisions were used to cover the Axis retreat. The Centauro Division was virtually destroyed fighting in Tunisia. By then, the M13/40 and the M14/41 were completely surpassed, and their armament was all but useless against the opposing M3 Lee and M4 Sherman medium tanks at all but point-blank range, while both could easily destroy an M13/40 from a distance; they resorted to firing at the suspensions and the tracks, and to rely on fire support by the Semoventi and artillery.

=== Postwar use ===
During the 1948 Arab–Israeli War, two or three M13/40s which were left behind in North Africa were incorporated into the Egyptian armed forces. These were used during the Battles of Negba, where one was knocked out and subsequently captured by Israeli troops. For a few years after the war, the tank remained in the Negba kibbutz as a monument to the battle.

== Characteristics ==
The M13/40 was a conventional light tank of the early war period, similar in capability to other Vickers-derived designs such as the Polish 7TP and Soviet T-26. While being virtually impotent against the heavily armoured British Matilda II, at a weight of 13 tons it carried armour comparable to most of its opponents of 1940–41 and its 47 mm long-barrelled gun was effective against many other British tanks of 1940–41, which were similarly armoured to the M13 but carried 2pdr (40 mm) guns with shorter range and inferior ballistic performance. At that time, most German tanks were armed with 20 mm, 37 mm guns or 50 mm and 75 mm low velocity guns. Only after 1942 did the Germans start the widespread adoption of weapons of 50 mm and 75 mm calibre long barrelled guns with high enough velocity for adequate anti-tank use, which gave the M13/40s gun an advantage over comparable German tanks in the early war. The adoption of the 47 mm long gun was probably the best feature of the M13. Due to its relatively large calibre, the main gun's HE round was also very useful against towed guns and infantry, and eliminated or at least mitigated, for the first years of war, the need for a dedicated support vehicle such as the Wehrmacht had in the early Panzer IV and Stug III. The diesel engine was an advantage, and the simplicity of production suited the state of Italian industry.

The tank also had many shortcomings which severely hampered its effectiveness on the battlefield: the engine provided good range, but not great power and reliability. The M13's engine was the same as the M11/39 but the newer tank was heavier, which resulted in lower speed and more strain on the powerplant. The suspension and tracks were reliable, but resulted in relatively low speeds, not much better than infantry tanks such as the Matilda. Armament was sufficient for 1940–41 but did not keep up with the increased armour and firepower on Allied or German tanks. The method of construction, using rivets, was outdated. Most tanks of the era were switching to the use of welding for construction, since rivets can shear off when hit, becoming additional projectiles inside the tank. The two-man turret was less efficient in combat than the three-man turrets used in many other tanks of the era. Radios were not fitted to many tanks.

Italian historians Filippo Cappellano and Pier Paolo Battistelli have pointed out that the disappointing performance of the tank early in the war, where its armament was by no means inadequate, can be ascribed to its crews' almost complete lack of training (the first tank training centre was created only in 1941) and experience, coupled with poor tactical doctrine, the lack of radios, and the fact that many units were hastily created and sent to the battlefield, and also to the lack of armoured recovery vehicles; they state that, while the training and experience of the Italian crews improved during the conflict, their tanks' technical disadvantage worsened. In such a condition, they marvel that the Italian tanks were able to fight for as long as they did.

== Variants ==
The M13/40 series was Italy's most-produced tank of the war with over 3,000 having been built, including later variants such as the M14/41. It was equipped with a more powerful engine as well as better air filters for operations in North Africa. The last version was the M15/42 tank produced in 1943, with a better petrol engine and a longer 47/40 gun. It also had thicker armour than the previous models. The Semovente 75/18 self-propelled gun was built by utilizing the M13/40 or M14/41 chassis.

The Semovente Comando M40 was an M13/40 tank with the turret replaced by a large multi-piece hatch. The hull housed additional radios and other communication equipment.

- Cappellano, F.; Battistelli, P. P. (2012). Italian Medium Tanks, 1939–45. New Vanguard 195. Oxford: Osprey Publishing. ISBN 978-1-84908-775-9.
- Falessi, Cesare; Pafi, Benedetto (1976). Veicoli da Combattimento dell'Esercito Italiano dal 1939 al 1945 (in Italian). Intyrama books.
- Pignato, Nicola (2004). Italian Armored Vehicles of World War Two. Squadron/Signal publications. ISBN 0-89747-475-9.
