= Cannone da 47/32 =

Italian infantry gun / anti-tank gun during World War II

Cannone da 47/32 mod. 1935
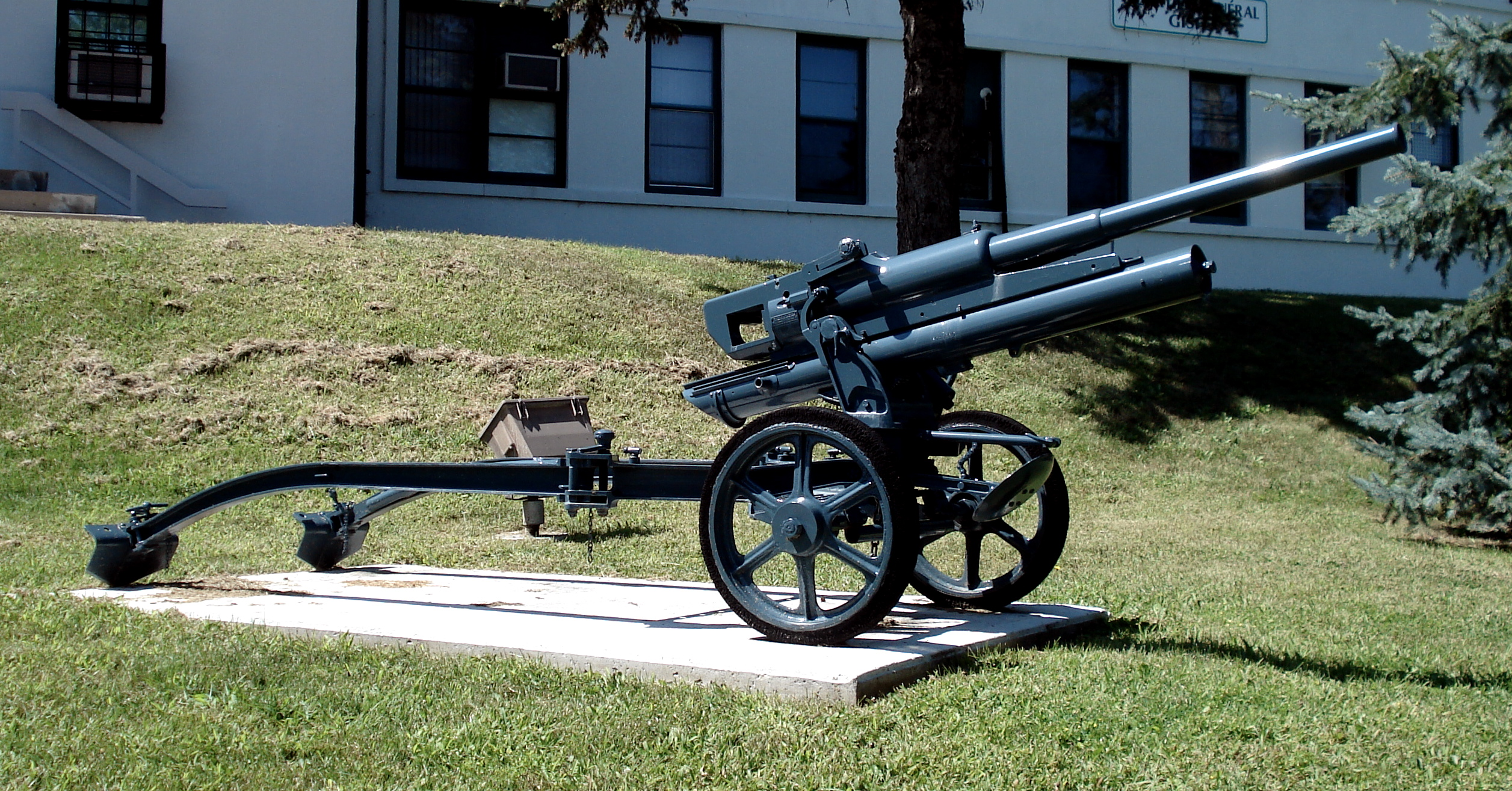
- Type: Infantry gun / Anti-tank gun
- Place of origin: Austria

Service history
- Used by: See § Users
- Wars: World War II

Production history
- Designer: Böhler
- Manufacturer: Böhler
- No. built: Italy: 3000+
- Variants: 47/32 Mod. 39; 47/40 Mod. 38

Specifications
- Mass: Travel: 315 kg (694 lb); Combat: 277 kg (611 lb)
- Barrel length: bore: 1.525 m (5 ft 0 in) L/32 overall: 1.680 m (6 ft)
- Shell: L/32 gun: 47×195mmR; L/40 gun: 47×328mmR
- Shell weight: 1.5 kg (3 lb 5 oz) AP
- Caliber: 47 mm (1.9 in)
- Breech: Horizontal sliding-wedge
- Carriage: Split-trail
- Elevation: -15° to +56°
- Traverse: 62°
- Muzzle velocity: 630 metres per second (2,100 ft/s) AP; 250 m/s (820 ft/s) HE; 755 metres per second (2,480 ft/s) AP L/40 AFV
- Maximum firing range: 7,000 m (7,700 yd)

The Cannone da 47/32 mod. 1935 was an Italian artillery piece that saw service during World War II. It was originally designed by Austrian firm Böhler, and produced in Italy under license. The Cannone da 47/32 was used both as an infantry gun and an anti-tank gun at which it was effective against light to medium armored tanks.

== History ==
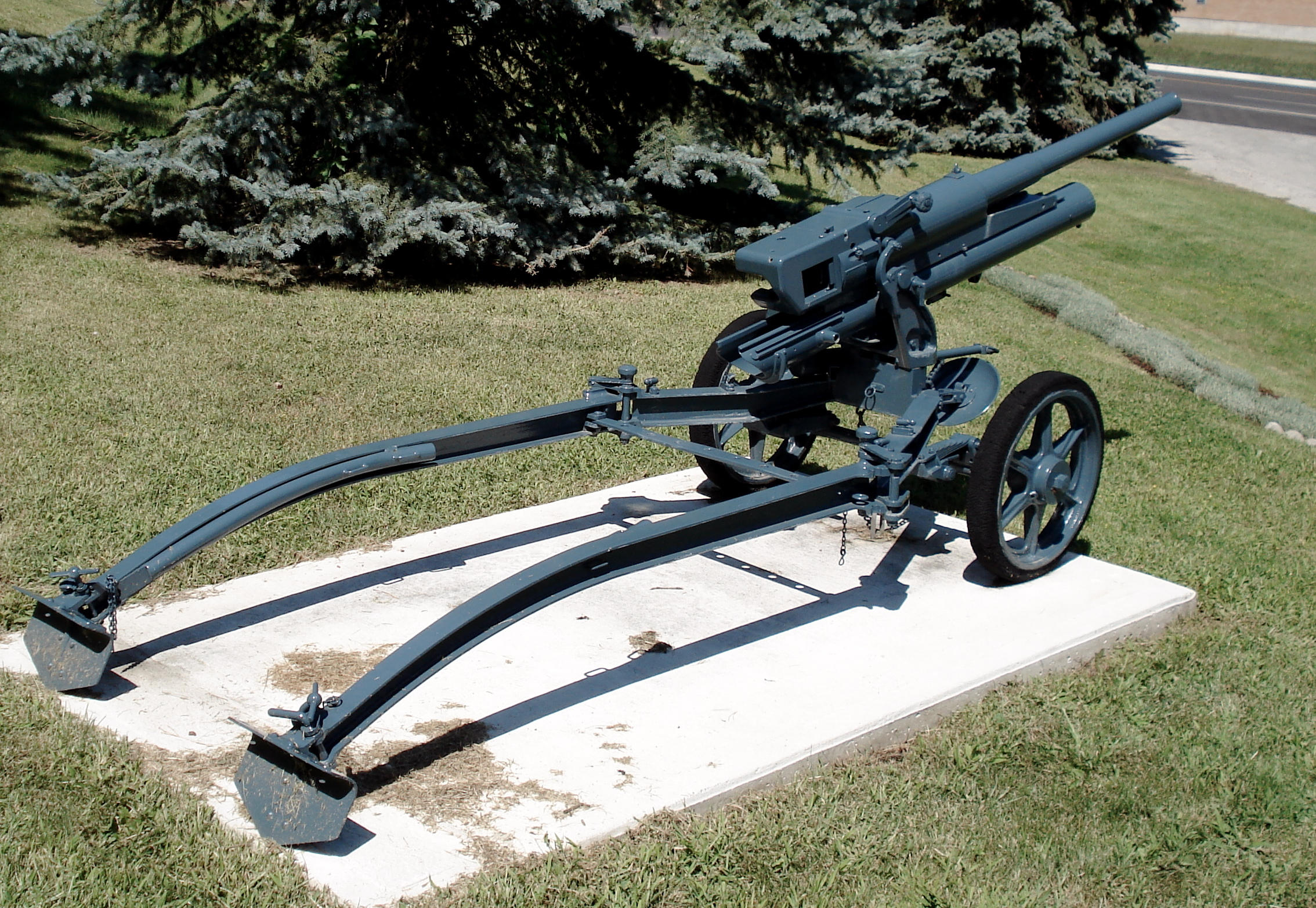
Rear view of a 47/32 M35 at CFB Borden

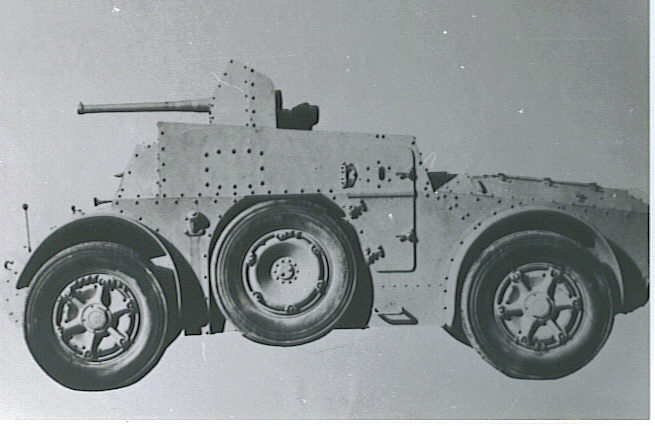
AB 41 with 47/32

The Austrian firm of Böhler originally designed and manufactured the gun. In the 1930s Italy bought some of these guns from Böhler, and then began to produce the weapon under license, continuing its development. The Cannone da 47/32 M35 was the main armament in the M13/40 medium tank, the M14/41 medium tank, and experimentally on the AB 41 armored car (see photograph), and the 47/32 self-propelled gun.

The 47/32 was built in two versions, the first with semi-pneumatic disk wheels, and the second (in 1939, from which the name 47/32 mod. 39) with improved barrel and suspension (in some series also light-alloy wheels with semi-pneumatic tires). To tow this piece, the Fiat-OCI 708 CM tractor and the L3 tankette were used, but these projects were soon abandoned as the gun was subjected to breaking at the axles spindles and shanks. Due to its shape, the 47/32 was commonly called "elefantino" (little elephant) by the troops.

The 47/32 was primarily an anti-tank gun but was also used as a close support weapon. In 1940 it had roughly the same degree of armor penetration of its contemporaries such as the British 2-pounder gun, the German Pak 36 and the Soviet 45 mm gun. It outperformed the French 25 mm gun and a High Explosive shell was available unlike the 2-Pounder. Its major drawbacks were the inadequacy of the gun to be towed by truck, and the lack of a gun shield. The failure of the Italian Army to produce and deploy a more powerful gun in numbers meant that by 1942 the 47/32 gun was still seeing frontline service despite being ineffective against the heavier tanks it had to face.

For use in the M15/42 tank the 47/32 gun was redesigned with a longer L/40 barrel and an enlarged ammunition chamber. The larger amount of propellant combined with the longer barrel greatly increased the armour penetration capability of the 47/40 gun.

=== Service with other nations ===
The original Böhler and license-produced versions were also used in the Austrian, Chinese, Dutch, Finnish, Romanian, Estonian, Latvian, Soviet (Captured ex-Latvian guns) and Swiss armies. Romania purchased 545 Austrian-made pieces and 275 Italian-made pieces in 1941. While not an original user, the German army captured several of these guns during their annexation of Austria (4.7 cm Pak 35/36(ö)), and their conquest of the Netherlands (4.7 cm Pak 187(h)) and the Soviet Union (4.7 cm Pak 196(r)) and took them into service. Some of these guns were donated to the Italians. After their surrender, these were recaptured along with Italian models (4.7 cm Pak 177(i)). These guns were then reassigned to German and RSI (Axis-aligned Italian) units or donated to Croatia. The British also made use of some captured guns which inlcluded shipping them over from North Africa to Malaya.

== Characteristics ==
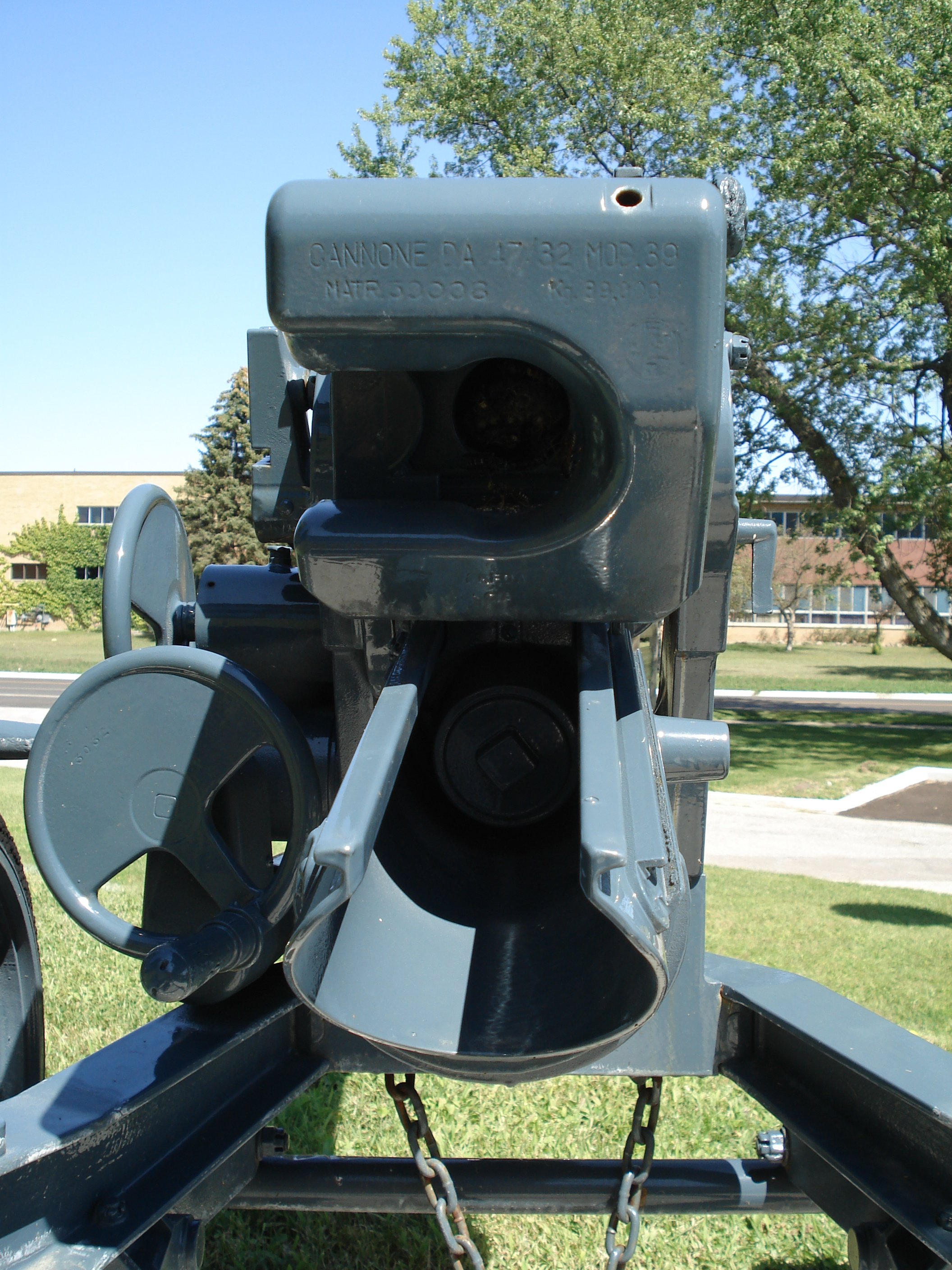

- Caliber: 47 mm (1.9 in)
- Barrel length: 1.68 metres (5 feet 6 inches)
- Length of Bore: 1.525 m (5.00 ft)
- Length of Rifling: 1.33 metres (4 feet 4 inches)
- Travelling Weight: 315 kg (694 lb)
- Weight in Action: 277 kg (611 lb)
- Elevation: -15 degrees to +56 degrees
- Traverse: 62 degrees
- Muzzle Velocity: 630 m/s (2,067 ft/s) for AP; 250 m/s (820 ft/s) HE (L/40 Variant: 755 m/s for AP and 364 m/s for HE)
- Range: 7,000 m (23,000 ft) - HE
- Shell Weight: 1.44 kg (3.2 lb) AP; 2.37 kg (5.2 lb) HE
- Armor Penetration AP (L/32): 58 mm (2.3 in) at 100 m (110 yd); 43 mm (1.7 in) at 500 m (550 yd)
- Armor Penetration AP (L/40 Variant for Medium tank M15/42): 70 mm at 100 m, 50 mm at 500 m, 38 mm at 1000 m, 25 mm at 1500 m, 20 mm at 2000 m
- Armor Penetration HEAT: 55 mm at 90 degrees contact

== Users ==
- Albania
- Austria
- China
- Estonia
- Finland
- Italy
- Germany
- Latvia
- Netherlands
- Romania
- Soviet Union

== Sources ==
- Latimer, Jon (2000). Operation Compass 1940: Wavell's Whirlwind Offensive. Oxford, United Kingdom: Osprey. ISBN 9781855329676.
