= M14/41 tank =

Carro armato M14/41
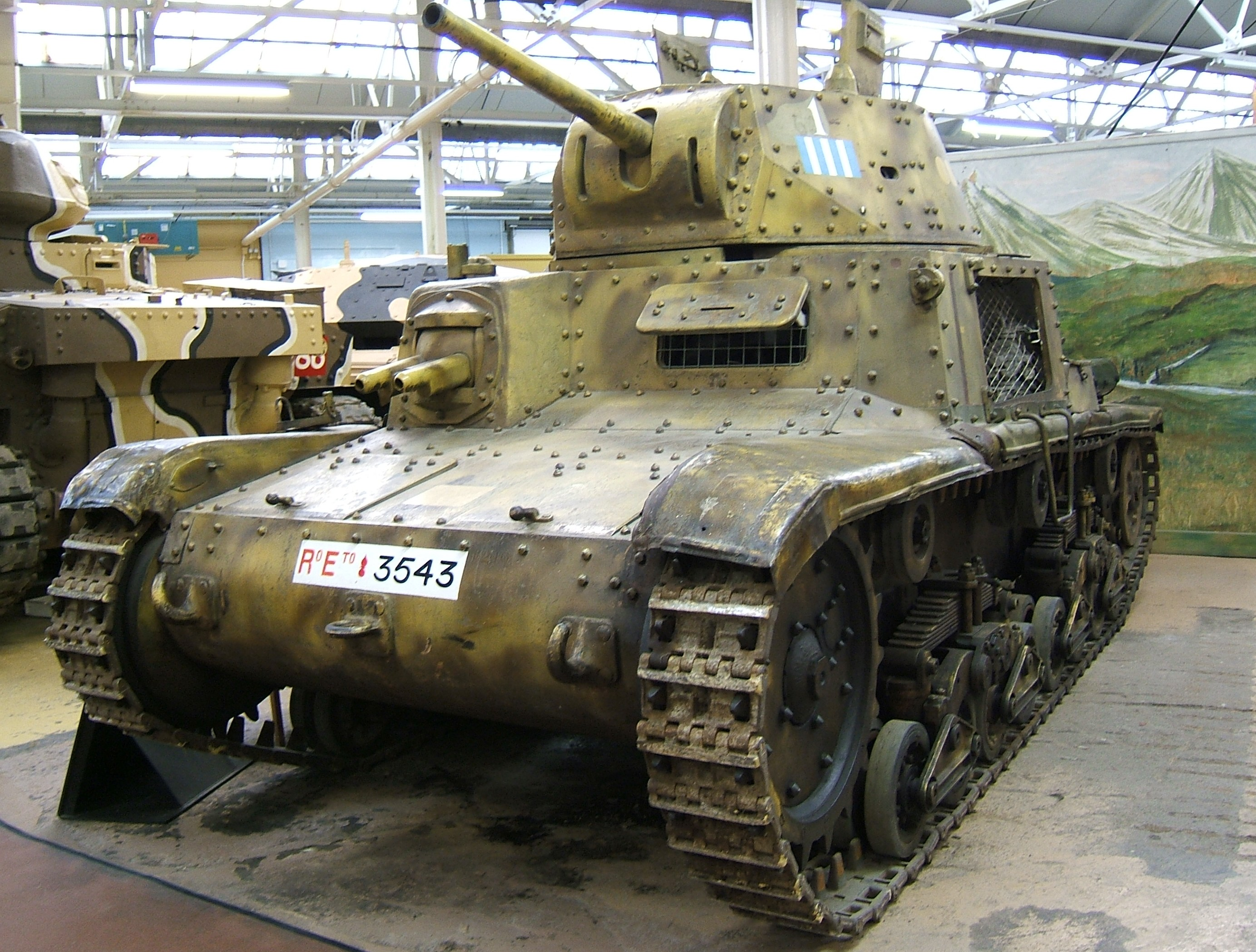
- M14/41 in the Bovington Tank Museum
- Type: Medium tank
- Place of origin: Kingdom of Italy

Service history
- Used by: Kingdom of Italy; Italian Partisans (captured); Nazi Germany; Australia (captured); United Kingdom (captured)
- Wars: World War II; Italian Civil War

Production history
- Designer: Ansaldo
- Manufacturer: Ansaldo
- Produced: 1941–42
- No. built: 744
- Variants: Carro Comando Semovente M41, M14/41 Centro Radio (M14/41CR), Semovente Controcarro M41M

Specifications
- Mass: 14.5 t (32,000 lb)
- Length: 4.915 m (193.5 in)
- Width: 2.280 m (89.8 in)
- Height: 2.370 m (93.3 in)
- Crew: 4 (commander/gunner, radio operator/machine gunner, loader, driver)
- Armour: Front: 30 mm (1.2 in); Sides/rear: 25 mm (0.98 in); Floor/roof: 6–14 mm (0.24–0.55 in); Turret front: 42 mm (1.7 in)
- Main armament: 1 × 47 mm cannone da 47/32 AT gun 87 rounds
- Secondary armament: 4 × 8 mm Breda mod. 38 machine guns (1 × coaxial, 1 × AA, 2 × in hull); 2,664 rounds
- Engine: SPA 8 TB M41 11,980 cc V8 diesel 145 hp (108 kW) at 1,900 rpm
- Suspension: Semi-elliptic leaf springs
- Ground clearance: 41 cm (16 in)
- Operational range: 200 km (120 mi)
- Maximum speed: 33 km/h (21 mph) on road

The M14/41 was a four-crew medium tank that served from 1941 in the Royal Italian Army. The official Italian designation was Carro Armato M14/41. It was an evolution of the previous M13/40 tank. The M14/41 was employed in the North African Campaign, fighting at El Alamein and in Tunisia.

== History ==
=== Development ===
The M14/41 was a slightly improved version of the earlier M13/40 with a more powerful diesel engine. The M14/41 was manufactured in 1941 and 1942.

=== In combat ===
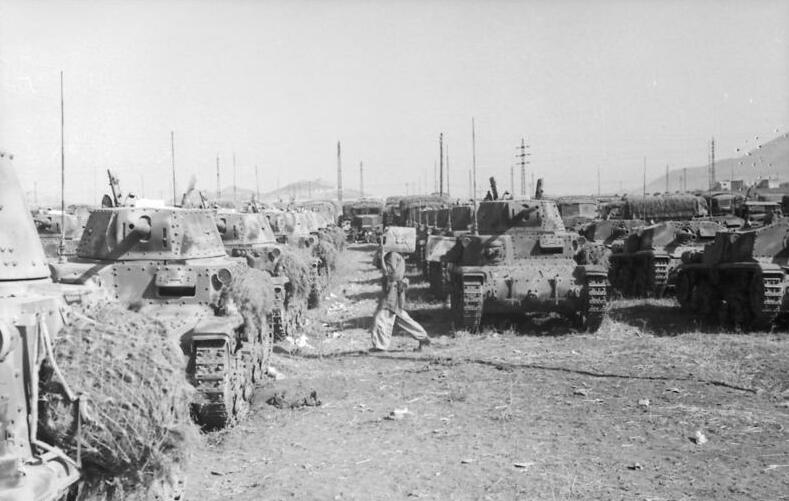
Italian Carro Armato M 15/42 tanks and semovente da 75/18 su scafo M 42 both of Disivione Ariete II, rgt. "Lancieri di Vittorio Emanuele II" (10°)), near Rome, end of September 1943.

== Units ==
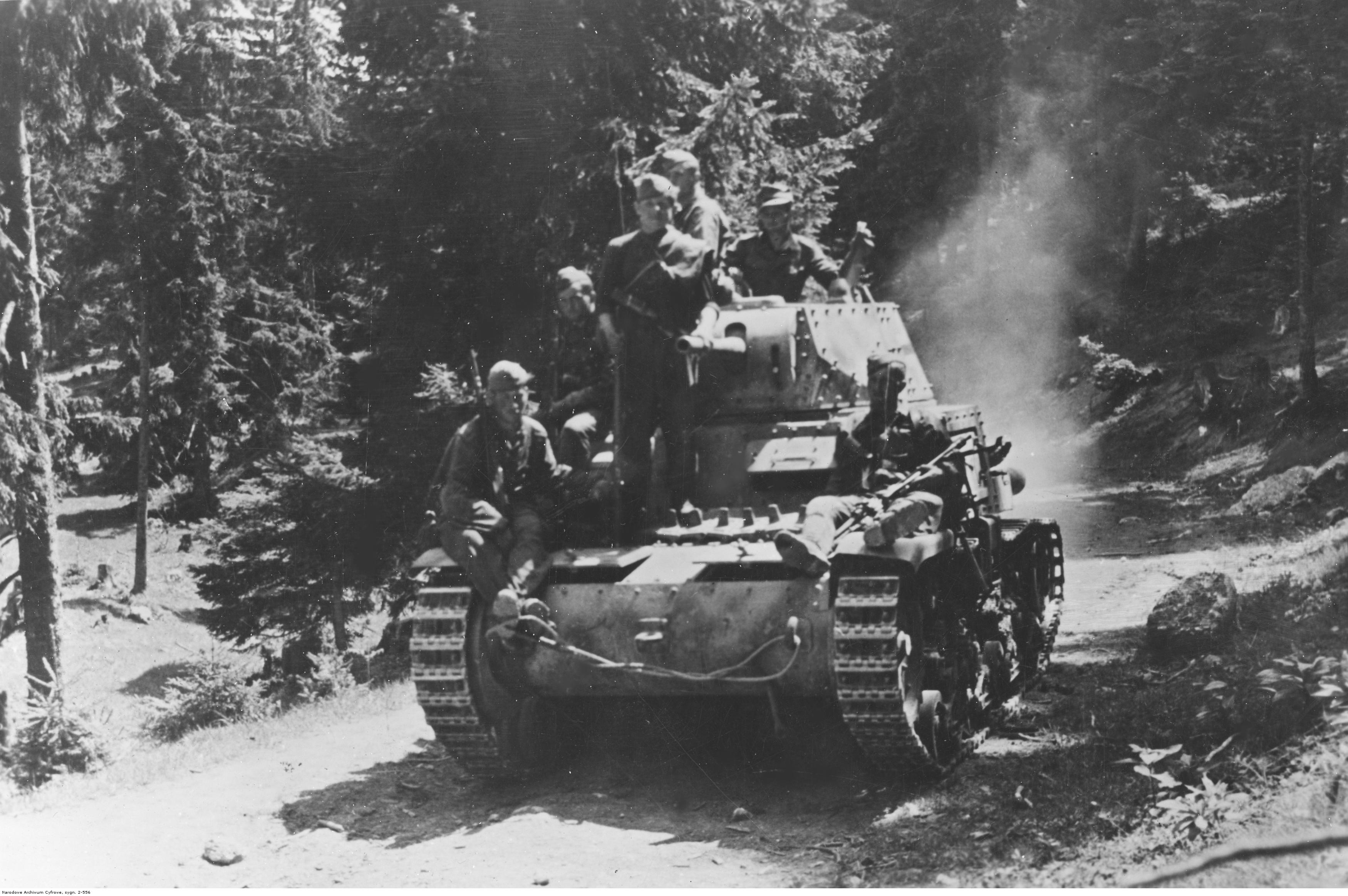
An M14/41 tank pressed into service by German forces pursues Yugoslavian partisans in the mountains of Bosnia, 1943.

The first unit to receive the M14/41 was the X Tank Battalion "M" of the 133rd Tank Infantry Regiment. The other units assigned the tank were the following:

- IV Tank Battalion "M", 31st Tank Infantry Regiment (later transferred to the 133rd Tank Infantry Regiment)
- X Tank Battalion "M", 133rd Tank Infantry Regiment (later transferred to the 132nd Tank Infantry Regiment)
- XII Tank Battalion "M", 31st Tank Infantry Regiment (later transferred to the 133rd Tank Infantry Regiment)
- XIV Tank Battalion "M", 31st Tank Infantry Regiment
- XV Tank Battalion "M", 1st Infantry Division "Superga"
- XVI Mixed Tank Battalion, in Sardinia
- XVII Tank Battalion "M", 31st Tank Infantry Regiment
- XVIII Tank Battalion "M", reserve unit based in Italy, disbanded 8 September 1943
- LI Tank Battalion "M", 31st Tank Infantry Regiment (later transferred to the 133rd Tank Infantry Regiment)

== Variants ==
The M 14/41 chassis served as the basis for the far more successful Semovente da 90/53 tank destroyer.

The prototype Carro Armato Celere Sahariano was developed on the M 14/41 chassis in 1943.

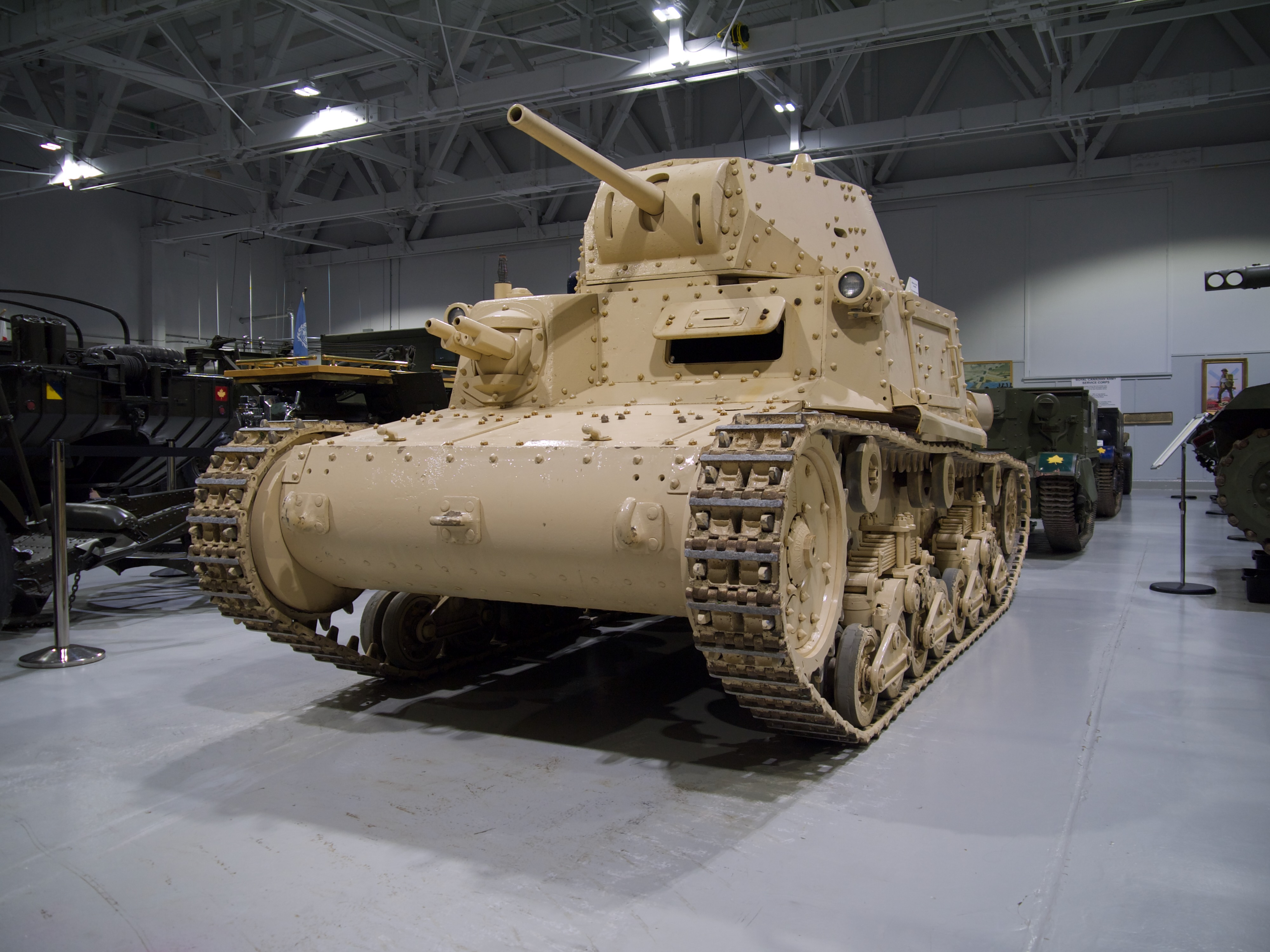
M14/41 tank at Base Borden Military Museum
