= Breda 38 =

Machine gun

Mitragliatrice Breda cal. 8 mod. 38 per carri armati
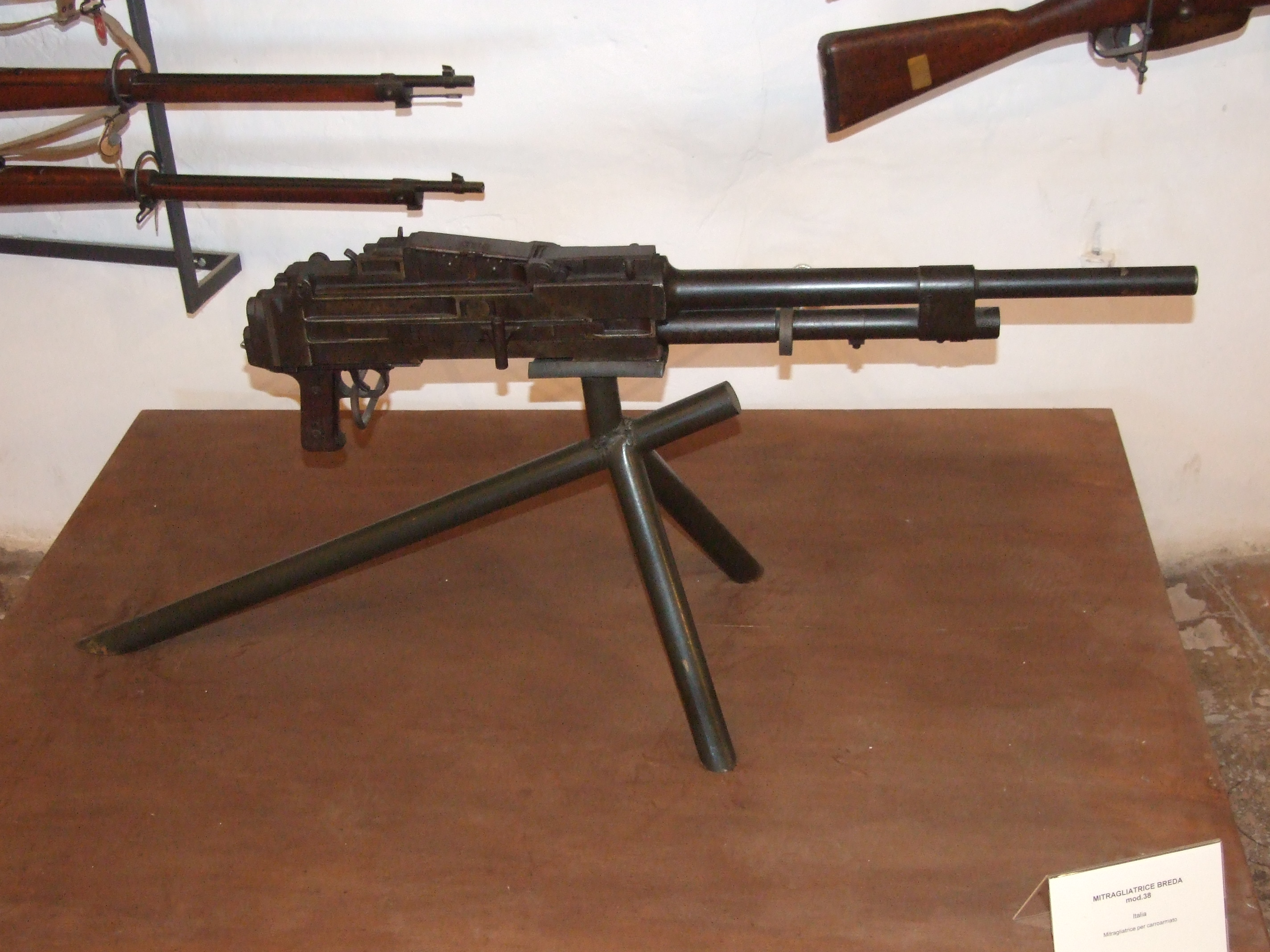
- A Breda Mod 38 at display at the Forte di San Leo
- Type: Tank machine gun
- Place of origin: Italy

Service history
- In service: 1938–1943
- Used by: Italy; Portugal
- Wars: World War II; Portuguese Colonial War

Production history
- Manufacturer: Breda Meccanica Bresciana

Specifications
- Mass: 16.3 kg (36 lb)
- Length: 897.5 mm (35.33 in)
- Barrel length: 600 mm (24 in)
- Cartridge: 8×59mm RB Breda; 7.92×57mm Mauser
- Action: Gas-operated
- Rate of fire: 550 rds/min theoretical, 350 rds/min practical
- Muzzle velocity: 770 metres per second (2,500 ft/s)
- Effective firing range: 300 m (330 yd)
- Feed system: 24-round vertical box magazine

The Mitragliatrice Breda calibro 8 modello 38 per carri armati was an Italian tank-pattern machine gun used in the Second World War on the Fiat L6/40, the Fiat M11/39 and the Fiat M13/40. It was also adapted to act as an infantry machine gun. The M38 is based upon the Breda M37. The Breda 38 received the German identification code Kampfwagen-Maschinengewehr 350(i).

== Development ==
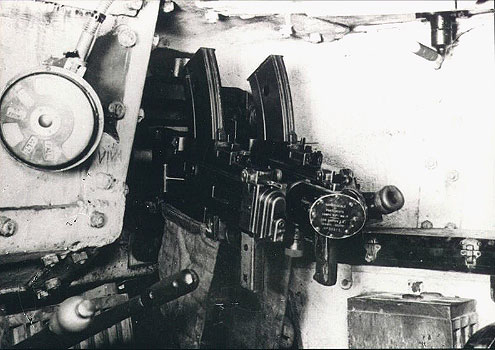
Hull-mounted double Breda Mod. 38 in a Fiat M13/40 tank

It was also adapted for use as an infantry machine gun. For this purpose the gun was mounted on a machine-gun tripod by means of an adapter, and was fitted with a temporary rear sight on the right of the body and a temporary front sight on the right of the barrel at the muzzle. The temporary open sights took the place of the optical sight used when the gun was tank-mounted.

== Design details ==
The gun is air-cooled, gas-operated, and magazine-fed, and has a quick-change barrel. Its operational features are simple, and it is extremely easy to field-strip or disassemble completely. The barrel is sufficiently heavy (4,5 kg) to enable it to fire a large number of rounds in quick succession without overheating.
