= Tanks in World War II =

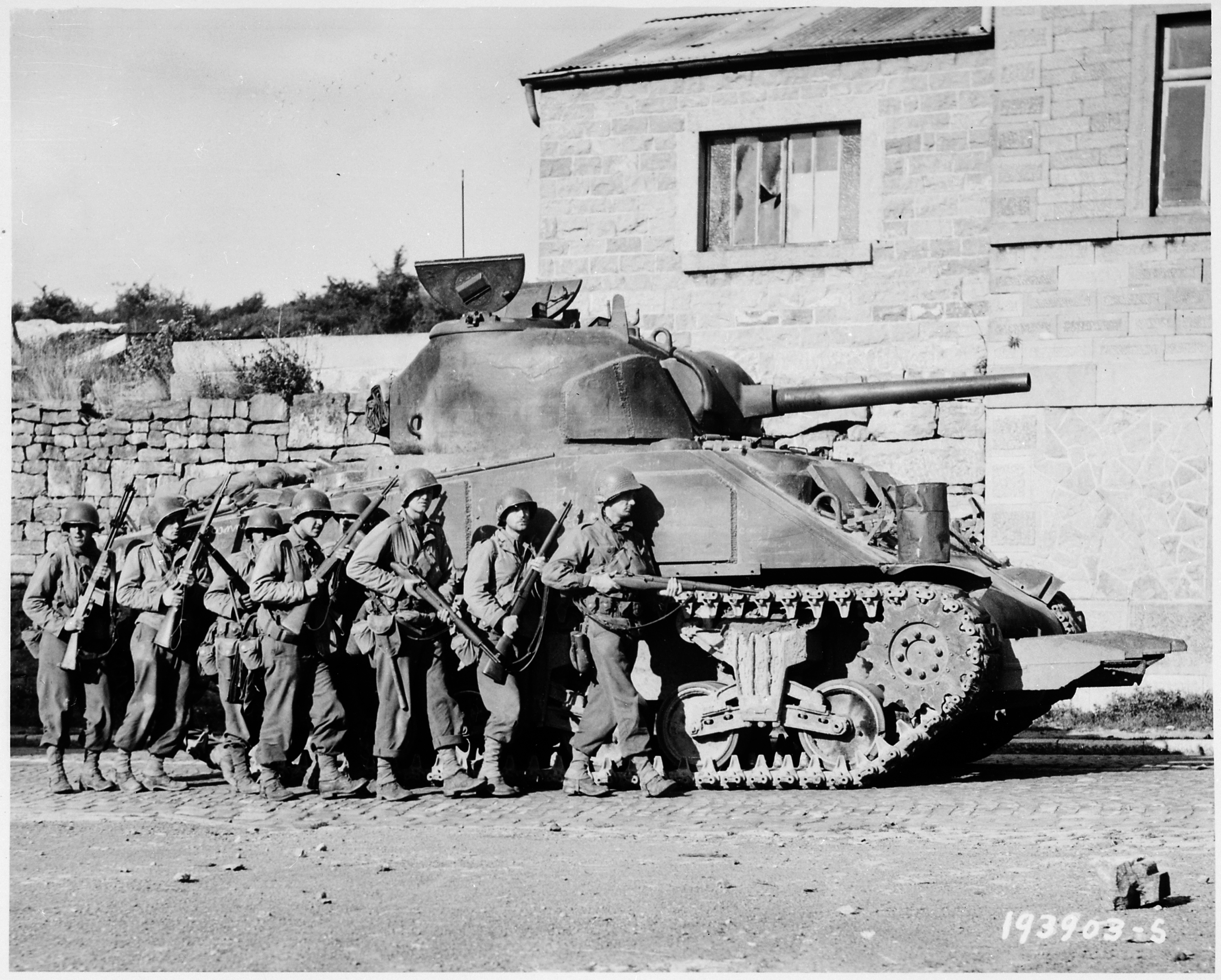
Combined arms in action: a WWII tank (M4 Sherman shown) was effective against a wide range of targets, but often needed support of infantry to protect it against close attacks

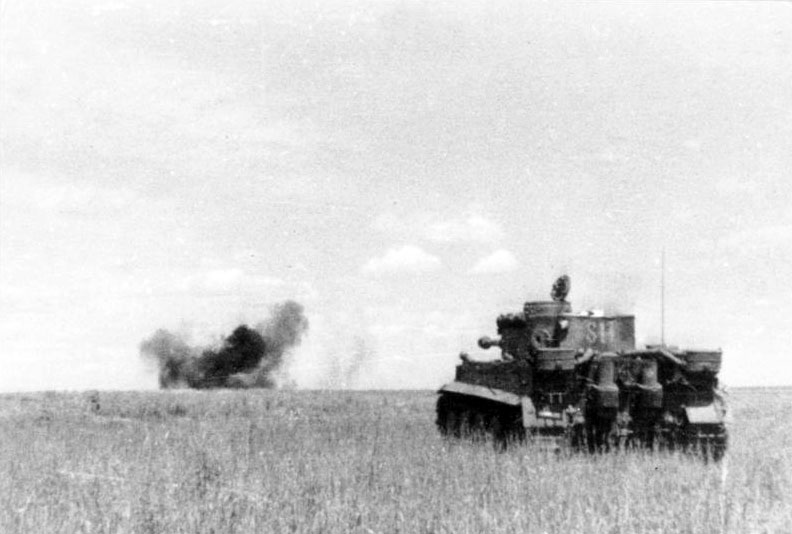
The Tiger I heavy tank could use its long ranged powerful gun to advantage in the open landscapes of the Battle of Kursk, 1943

Tanks were an important weapons system in World War II. Although tanks in the inter-war years were the subject of widespread research, few were made in just a few countries. However, during World War II, most armies employed tanks, and thousands were built every month. Tank usage, doctrine, and production varied widely among the combatant nations. By war's end, a consensus was forming on tank doctrine and design.

== Background ==
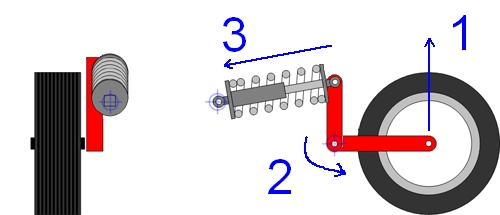
Christie suspension schematic

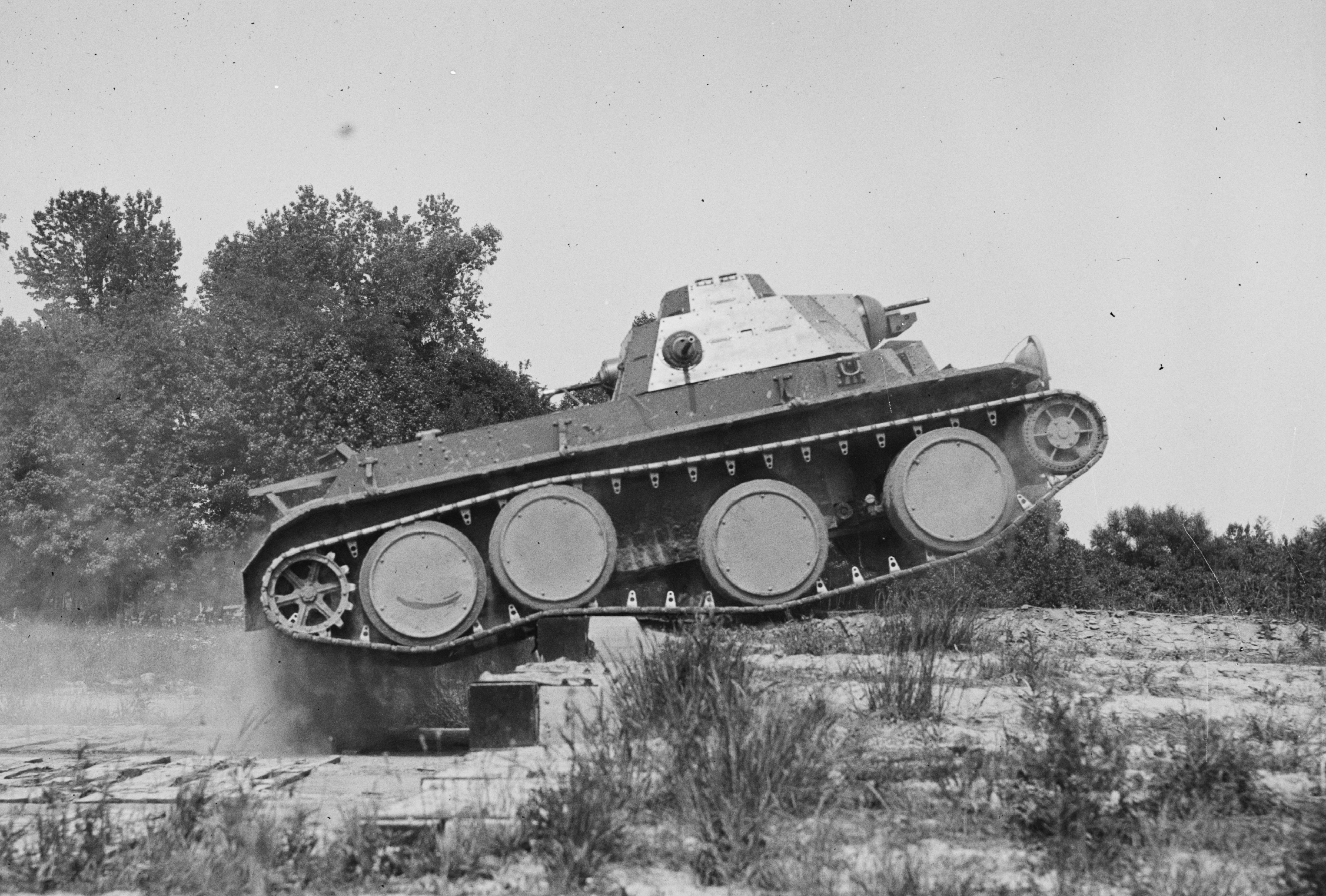
T3E2 tank with Christie suspension crossing an obstacle during tests in 1936

The tank was invented by the British, in 1916, and first used during World War I, with nearly simultaneous development in France. Tanks of the First World War reflected the novelty of the idea and the primitive state of the automotive industry. World War I tanks moved at a walking pace, they were relatively unreliable, and the best usage of them was still developing up to the war's end. A breakthrough in tank design was the Christie suspension, developed by an American engineer, J. Walter Christie, which allowed longer movement of the suspension than conventional leaf-spring systems then in common use, and allowed the tanks to move faster.

The doctrine of armored warfare changed radically in the inter-war years as armies sought ways to avoid the deadlock imposed by modern firepower and looked for the means to restore offensive power on the battlefield. Initially, tanks had been used for close support of infantry, but as modern mechanized doctrine was developed by several armies, tanks became an essential part of the combined-arms team. In addition to infantry support, tanks fulfilled traditional cavalry roles, provided mobile artillery support, and were adapted to combat engineering roles.

Tank design gradually improved in the inter-war period also. Reflecting the growth of the automotive industry, tank engines, transmissions, and track systems were improved. By the beginning of the war in September 1939, tanks were available that could travel hundreds of miles on their tracks with a limited number of breakdowns.

The war accelerated the pace of change in design. In particular, the gun-vs-armor race of the war led to rapid improvements in firepower and armor.

== Major themes ==
The United Kingdom, the US, the Soviet Union, and France produced significant numbers of tanks before and during World War II. The early tanks of Germany were inferior to many of their opponents' tanks in the areas of armor and firepower. However, in their tactical employment the German tanks dominated all rivals early in the war. Germany concentrated the tanks and the few infantry transport vehicles it had into Panzer divisions. German doctrine stressed the use of rapid movement, mission-type tactics and combined-arms where tanks operated with mobile infantry and air support; this doctrine was popularly called [a] Blitzkrieg. For this to work the German tanks were all equipped with radios, which provided unmatched command and control for flexible employment.

In contrast, for example, almost 80 percent of French tanks lacked radios, essentially because their battle doctrine was based on a more slow-paced, deliberate conformance to planned movements. This required fewer radios at all levels. French tanks generally outclassed German tanks in firepower and armor in the 1940 campaign, but their poor command and control doctrine negated these advantages. By 1943, two-way radio was nearly universal in all armies.

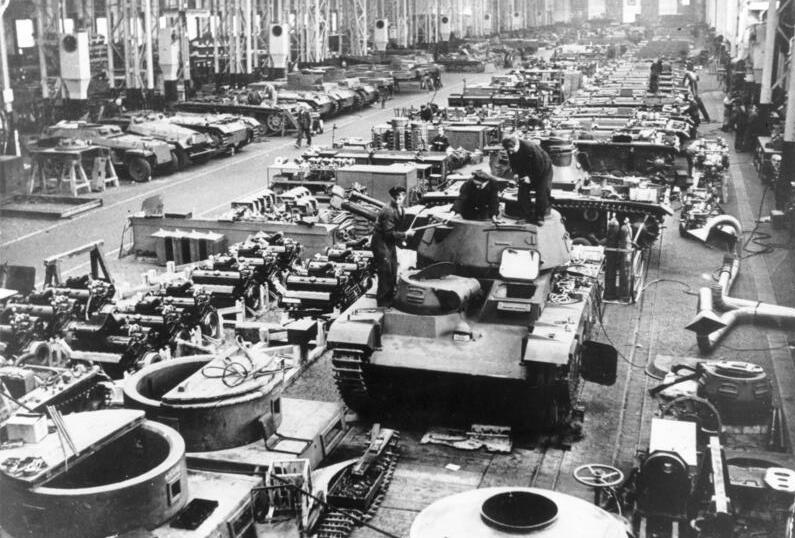
Early war production.

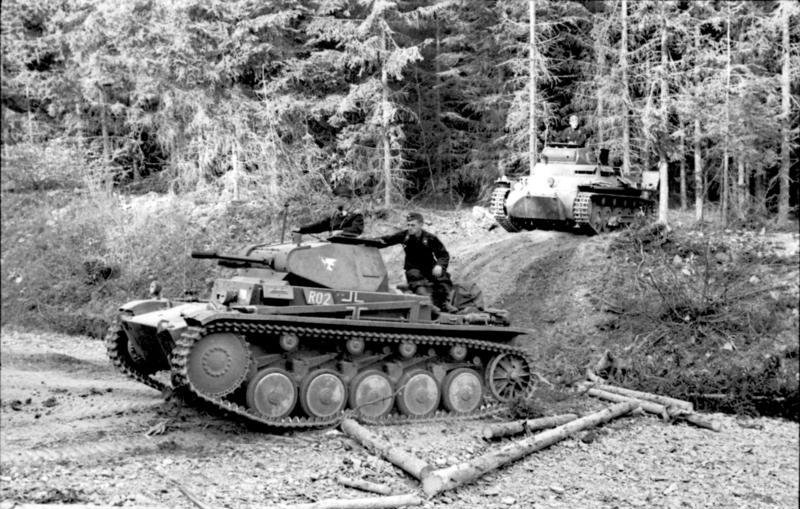
In May 1940 the majority of German tanks used against France were the lightly armored and armed Panzer II (front) and Panzer I (rear)

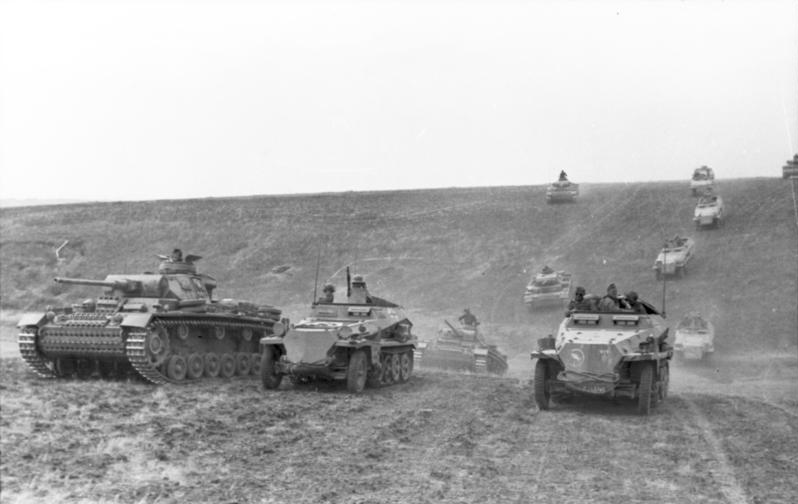
German infantry in half-track transports could operate alongside tanks cross country

A trend towards heavier tanks was unmistakable as the war proceeded. In 1939, most tanks had maximum armor of 30 mm (1.2 in) or less, with guns with no larger caliber than 37–47 mm. Medium tanks of 1939 weighed around 20 tonnes (20 long tons). By 1945, typical medium tanks had maximum armor over 60 mm thick, with guns in the 75–85 mm (3.0–3.3-inch) range and weights of 30 to 45 t (30 to 44 long tons). Light tanks, which dominated most armies early in the war, gradually disappeared from front-line service.

Turrets, which had always been considered, but were not previously a universal feature on tanks, became recognized as essential. It was appreciated that if the tank's gun was to be used to engage both 'soft' (unarmored) and armored targets, then it needed to be as large and powerful as possible, making one large gun with an all-round field of fire vital. Also, mounting the gun in a turret ensured that the tank could fire from hull down cover. Hull-mounted guns required that most of the vehicle be exposed to enemy fire. Multiple-turreted or multi-gun designs such as the Soviet T-35, American Medium Tank M3 (hull mounted and turret gun), French Char B1 (hull mounted howitzer) or British Cruiser Mk I (two ancillary machine gun turrets) slowly became less common during World War II. Experience showed that a tank commander could not effectively direct the fire of several weapons; also, the newer dual-purpose guns eliminated the need for multiple weapons. Most tanks still retained a hull machine gun, and usually one or more machine guns in the turret, to protect them from infantry at short range.

Tanks were adapted to a wide range of military tasks, including engineering. Specialized models, such as flame-thrower tanks, armored recovery vehicles for towing disabled tanks from the battlefield, and command tanks with extra radios were also used. Some of these tank variants live on as other classes of armored fighting vehicle, no longer called "tanks". All major combatant powers also developed tank destroyers (self-propelled anti-tank guns for mobile defense) and assault guns, as armored vehicles carrying large-caliber guns, but often no turrets. Turreted vehicles are expensive to manufacture compared to non-turreted vehicles.

One trend seen in World War II was the usage of older, lighter tank chassis to mount larger weapons in fixed casemates, as self-propelled guns, tank destroyers or assault guns. For example, the Soviet T-34 could mount an 85 mm gun in the turret, but the same chassis could carry the much more effective 100 mm gun in a fixed casemate such as the SU-100, the successor of the SU-85. Likewise, the obsolete German Panzer II light tank, too vulnerable for a direct fire role, was modified to take a powerful 75 mm PaK 40 gun in an open-topped, fixed casemate as the Marder II self-propelled artillery piece.

The German tank destroyers Panzerjäger ("tank hunters") were basically made by taking an existing anti-tank gun and mounting it on a convenient chassis to give mobility, usually with just a three-sided gun shield for crew protection. For instance, 202 obsolete Panzer I light tanks were modified by removing the turret and emplacing a Czech 4,7cm KPÚV vz. 38 (47 mm) anti-tank gun giving the Panzerjäger I self-propelled anti-tank gun. German tank destroyers based on the Panzer III and later German tanks were unique in that they had more armor than their tank counterparts.

Fully enclosed casemates on the Germans' Sturmgeschütz assault guns, from the beginning of the war, set a pattern used later by the similarly fully enclosed Jagdpanzer casemate-style tank destroyers, with the Soviets' similar Samokhodnaya ustanovka (SU) assault guns being used for the same dual-purpose roles. However, the lack of a rotating turret had limited the gun's traverse to a few degrees. This meant that the entire tank normally had to be turned onto its target by the driver, a much slower process than simply rotating a powered turret. If the vehicle became immobilized due to engine failure or track damage, it could not rotate its gun to counter opposing tanks, making it highly vulnerable to counterfire. This vulnerability was later exploited by opposing tank forces. Even the largest and most powerful of German tank destroyers were found abandoned on the field after a battle, having been immobilized by one or more hits by high explosive (HE) or armor-piercing (AP) shells to the track or front drive sprocket.

== Tank development timeline ==
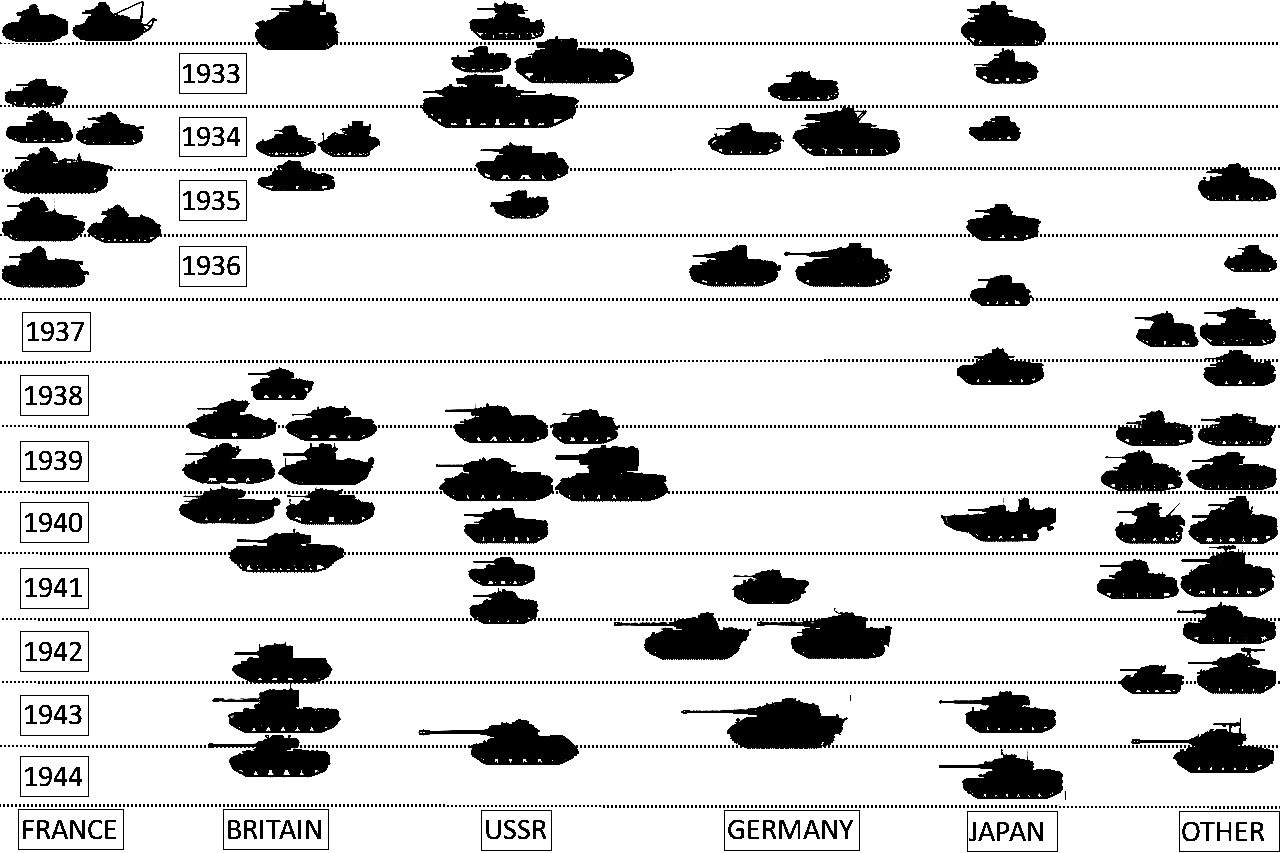
Tanks operated during World War II according to year and country of design (variants and upgrades not included). 'Other' column groups vehicles designed and manufactured in Czechoslovakia, Poland, Italy, Sweden, Hungary and the US.

== Tanks of the major combatants ==
=== Soviet Union ===
The Soviet Union started and ended the war with more tanks than the rest of the world combined (18,000–22,000). At the start of World War II the most common tank in Soviet service was the T-26 (derived from the Vickers 6-ton), lightly armoured and armed with a 45 mm anti-tank gun M1932 (19-K) gun capable of penetrating most German tanks at normal combat ranges. Few had radios. The design was mechanically sound although incapable of further development. The BT tank series, based on the Christie suspension system, were usually armed with the same 45 mm gun and were the most mobile tanks in the world at the time. Close-support versions of both tanks existed, armed with 76.2 mm howitzers. However, the BT was at the end of its design life. The Red Army also fielded thousands of light reconnaissance tanks such as the amphibious T-37 and T-38 tanks. These had limited combat value; although highly mobile, they were armed only with 7.62 mm machine guns and had very thin armour. The Red Army also had about 400 T-28 medium, multi-turreted tanks, which were in most respects equal to the German Panzer IV. Again, though, this design dated from 1931 and was obsolete.

The Soviet Union ended the 1930s with a huge fleet of tanks almost completely derived from foreign designs, but before 1941 developed some of the most important trend-setting tanks of the war. The problem the Soviet tank force faced in 1941 was not primarily the technical quality of its vehicles, but the very poor state of maintenance, the appalling lack of readiness, and the poor command situation brought on by the purges of the officer class. By 1940, the Red Army had adopted an advanced combat doctrine that its command structure and tank force simply could not execute.

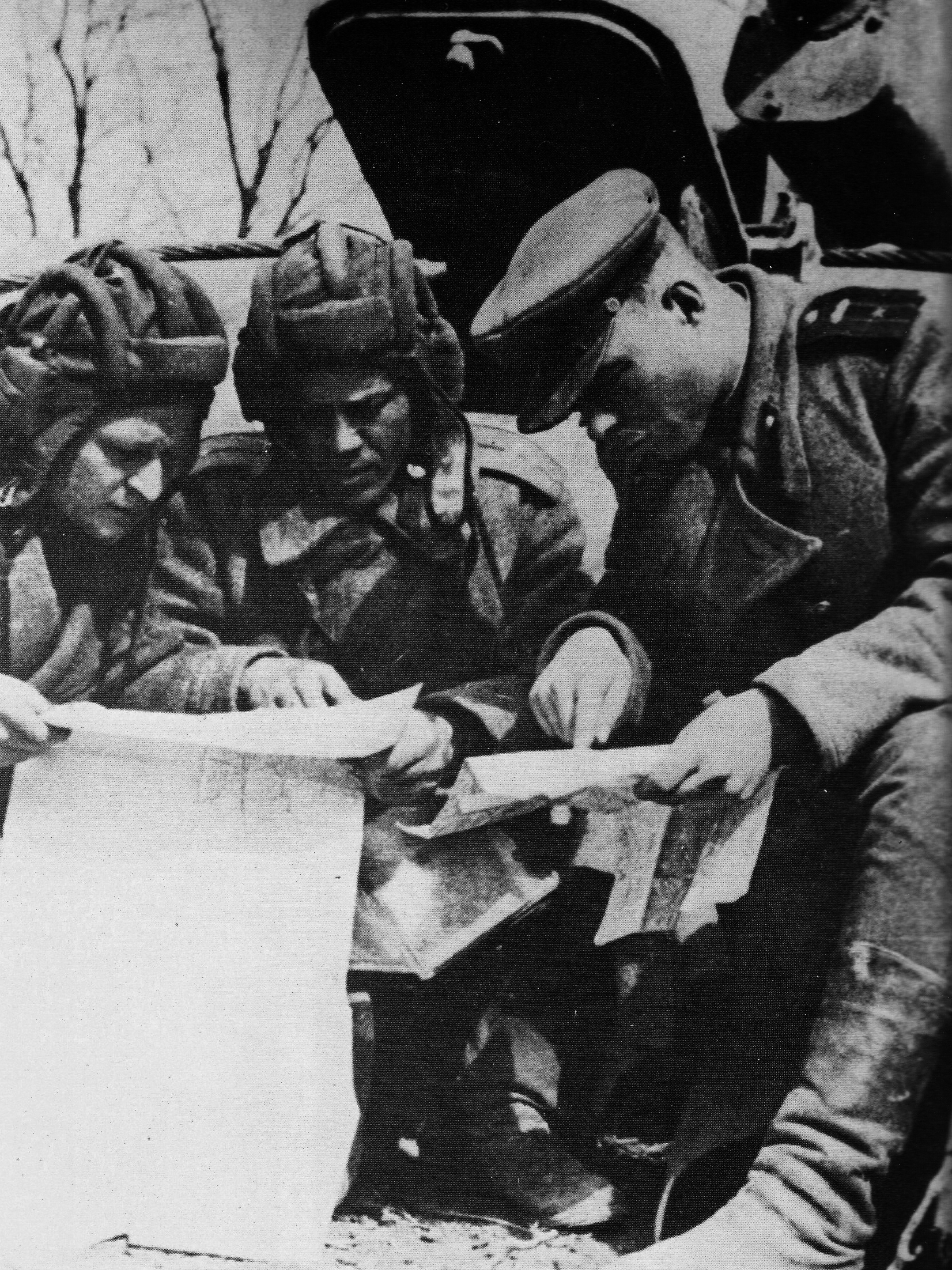
Soviet tank troops (Battle of Budapest, October 1944)

Several excellent designs began production in 1940–1941. Just prior to the war, the Red Army embarked on two closely related projects to reorganize its mechanized forces and re-equip them with modern designs that took lessons learned from the Spanish Civil War, the Battle of Khalkhin Gol and the Winter War into account. Some of these designs were copies of other countries' designs. The most significant was the T-34, which was originally designed as the successor to the BT series. Its heavier armour and 76.2 mm dual-purpose gun made it one of the best medium tanks of the first half of World War II. The T-34 eventually took on the roles of many other Soviet tanks. The T-34's chassis made it usable after the war, as it could be continuously upgraded with heavier guns, new turrets and other modifications. The other significant design was the KV-1 tank. These were armed with the same 76.2 mm gun as the T-34, and had the same Kharkiv model V-2 diesel engine. The KV tanks were equipped with a torsion bar suspension and much heavier armour than the T-34. The KV was slow, intended as a breakthrough tank. The KV-2 close-support version was armed with a 152 mm (6.0-inch) howitzer. The KV series was the main Soviet heavy tank until 1943, with the end of production and the destruction of most surviving vehicles. Early in 1944, the KV's successor, the IS-2 was introduced. It was armed with a 122 mm (4.8 in) gun, with thicker armour and better mobility. A new infantry-support tank was introduced in 1941: the T-50. It was intended to be the replacement for the T-26, and was equipped with a 45 mm gun, torsion-bar suspension and thicker armor than most other tanks in its class. However, production problems with its new engine led to the tank being cancelled after fewer than 70 had been made. The light reconnaissance role was filled by the amphibious T-40 and the cheaper, non-amphibious T-60.

At the beginning of German invasion of the USSR, most of the Soviet Union's tank force was composed of the T-26 and BT tanks series. A few T-40s had also appeared, along with about 1,363 mechanically unreliable early-model T-34 tanks and 677 KV series tanks. The early-model T-34s' heavy losses were caused by lack of coordination, lack of supplies, poor training, mechanical issues and the Red Army's general lack of preparation for war. Another difficulty for the T-34 was that it had only a four-man crew, with the tank commander forced to double as the gunner. Although he was spared from loading duties, unlike commanders in French tanks, it still crippled the tank commander's ability to maintain awareness of the battlefield, which gave German armour a tactical advantage.

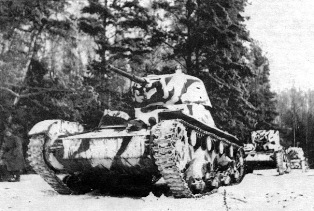
A column of Russian T-26 mod. 1939 and T-26 mod. 1933 light tanks from the 20th Tank Brigade moving towards the front line.

In 1941, large numbers of T-60s began to appear, reinforced in 1942 with the similar T-70. Both of these light tanks had torsion-bar suspension, light armour, and small engines. Their simple construction kept them in production even though their combat value was limited. The T-60 had only a 20 mm gun while the T-70 had a 45 mm. In addition, both had one-man turrets, making them difficult to crew effectively. The T-70 formed the basis for the later SU-76 self-propelled gun.

By October 1942, the general opinion was that Soviet tanks were among the best in the world, with Life magazine writing that "The best tanks in the world today are probably the Russian tanks...". The T-34 outclassed every German tank in service at the time of its introduction. At its height, production of all other tanks except the IS-2 was stopped to allow all available resources to be used exclusively for this tank, due to its widespread success in a variety of roles. The T-34 forced the Germans to adopt new, heavier designs such as the Panther and Tiger I, which in turn forced Soviet, American and British tank forces to upgrade their tanks further. German tendency to develop entirely new tanks toward the end of the war, rather than upgrading existing models, reduced the availability of tanks to German tank formations and helped the Red Army gain the initiative on the Eastern Front.

Later in the war, the light tank role was increasingly filled by Lend-Lease supplies from the United States, the United Kingdom and Canada, including the M3 light tanks and Valentine tank. Ironically, the T-34's speed, which exceeded that of many of the light tanks that were supposed to scout for it, led to even less Soviet light tank production.

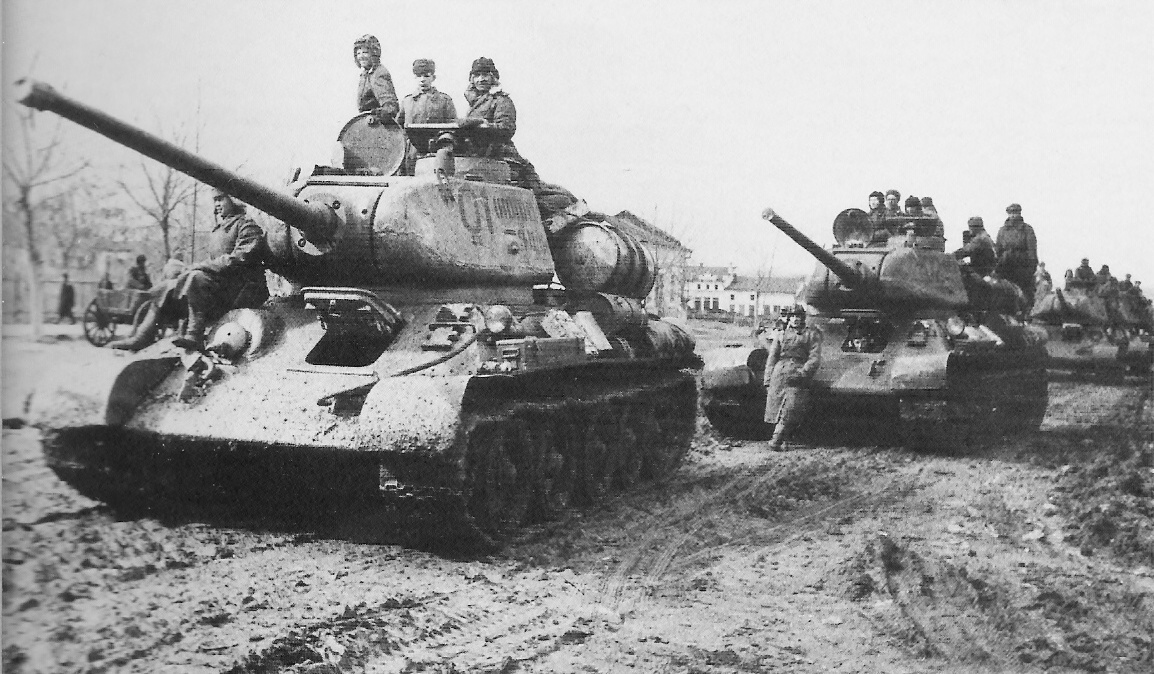
Early T-34-85 built at Factory 112

In order to deal with improved German tanks, the Soviets upgunned the T-34 in 1943, creating the T-34-85. This model had a much larger turret mounting an 85 mm (3.3-inch) gun and a larger turret capable of holding 3-men, which finally allowed the tank commander to concentrate fully on maintaining tactical awareness of the battlefield. The Soviets also introduced the 122 mm-armed IS-2 heavy tank, which had heavier armor than the KV while maintaining the same weight. Most of its armor was concentrated in the front of the tank, where it was expected to take most of its hits.

The IS-3 variant, produced in mid-1945, had a much more streamlined look and a larger, bowl-shaped tapered turret. Remarkably, the IS-3 had thicker armor but actually weighed slightly less than the IS-2, remaining under 50 tons (as compared to the Tiger II's 68). The armor design of the IS-3 was an enormous influence on postwar tank design, as seen in the Soviet T-55 and T-62 series, the United States M48 Patton and the West German Leopard 1.

Soviet tank production outstripped all other nations with the exception of the United States. The Soviets accomplished this through standardization on a few designs, generally forgoing minor qualitative improvements and changing designs only when upgrades would result in a major improvement.

Soviet tanks had turret and gun stabilization, starting with the T-28B, which had a rudimentary form as early as 1938.

=== United Kingdom ===
==== Doctrine ====
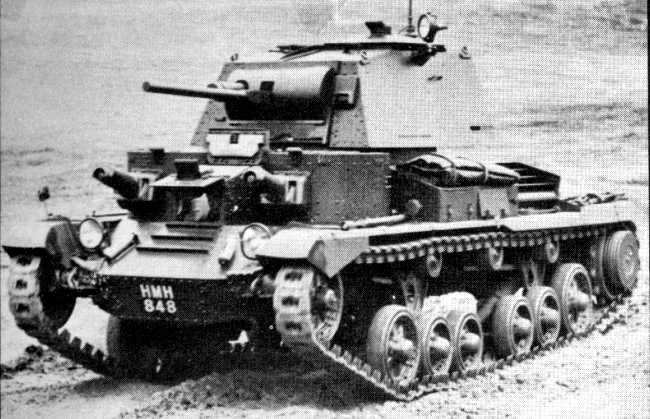
British Cruiser Tank Mark I (A9)

Britain had been the worldwide trend-setter in tank development from 1915, but had lost its leadership position as the Second World War approached. Hampered by restricted expenditure on the army in favour of the Royal Navy and the massive expansion of the Royal Air Force in the years leading up to the war and still organised for operations in Imperial defence as an expeditionary force, the British Army entered the war unprepared for the very sort of combat its influential theorists such as J.F.C. Fuller and B. H. Liddell Hart had advocated.

The British Army had developed two types of tanks – "Infantry Tanks" which were heavily armoured with good all terrain performance but were slow. This lack of speed was not considered a flaw as they were designed to support infantry assaults on enemy strong points or urban warfare where the ability to outpace a man on foot was deemed unnecessary. The other type were "Cruiser Tanks" which were intended for independent maneuvering, rapid breakouts and flanking attacks. Early Cruiser tanks gained performance at a cost in the armour they could carry. Reliability was an important issue especially in the harsh conditions of North Africa and the mountainous terrain of Southern Europe, where the A10 and A13 in particular were plagued by broken tracks and overheating engines.

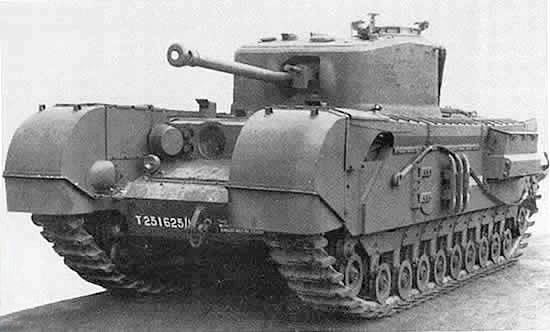
Late model Churchill infantry tank

British tank crews were trained to fire on the move and the armament was mounted for optimum balance such that the gunner could aim with his body rather than use geared elevation. This reduced available space inside the turret. Both early Cruiser and Infantry tanks carried the Ordnance QF 2-pounder, a 40 mm anti-tank gun, a good match for the contemporary German 3.7 cm KwK 36, and effective against tanks of the time but increasingly outclassed as the war progressed. Production shortages caused by losses in France and the Battle of the Atlantic forced the British to delay widespread introduction of the Ordnance QF 6-pounder (57 mm) anti-tank gun until 1942.

The lack of an adequate high-explosive shell for the 2-pounder and the growing number of 5 cm KwK 38 anti-tank guns in the Afrika Korps gave the German army in Libya a huge advantage for much of late 1941 and early 1942. This began to be offset by late 1942 but the Wehrmacht continued to enjoy a 12–18 month lead in tank and anti-tank gun development and production until the end of 1944. Britain produced 5000 tanks in the year of 1944.

==== Performance ====
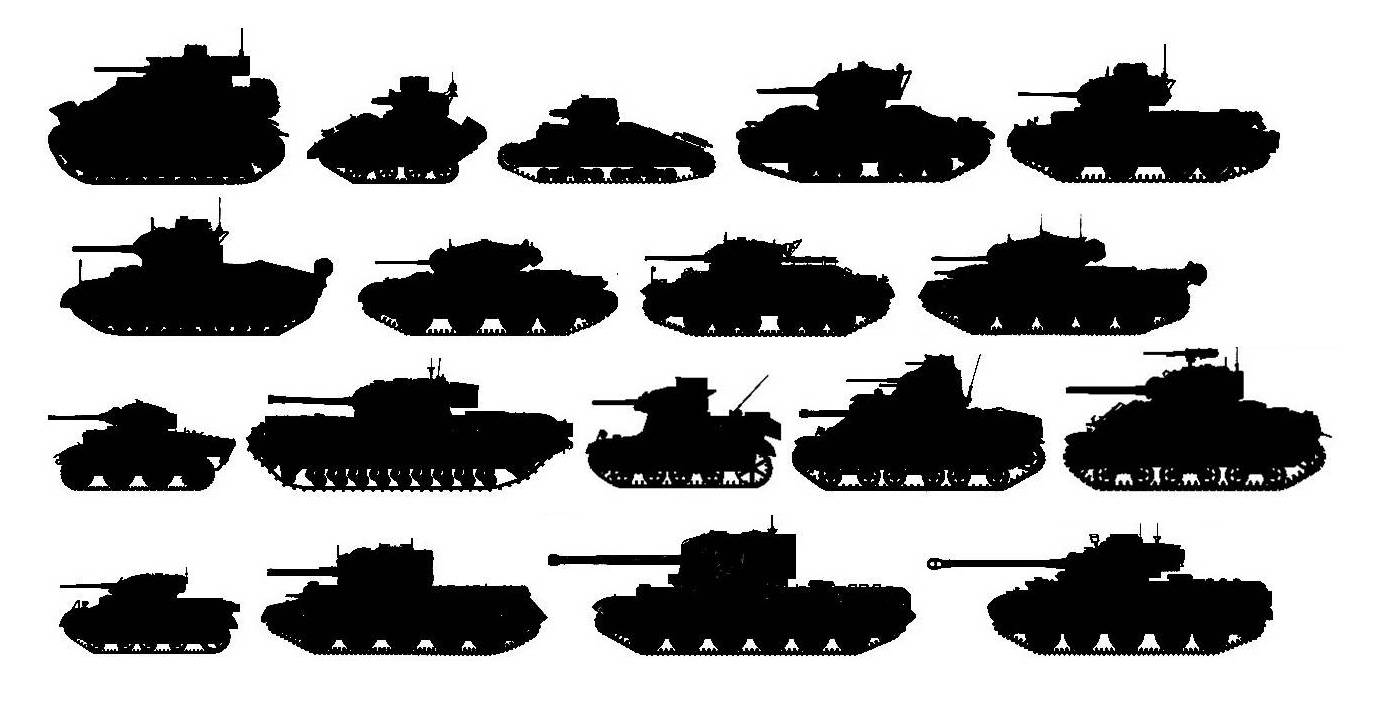
Silhouettes of tanks operated by the British during WWII

The A9 Cruiser Mk I was an effective tank in the French, Greek and early North African campaigns. The 2-pounder gun was better than comparable 37 mm weapons of Germany and the US, and lethal against tanks encountered during the North African campaign. However the minimal armor made the A9 vulnerable to most contemporary anti-tank weapons and the design was quickly superseded by the A10 Cruiser, Mark II.

A number of A10s were part of the British Expeditionary Force (BEF) sent to France in the early stages of World War II. The A10's cross country performance was recorded as poor, due to narrow, easily thrown tracks, but material losses incurred in the aftermath of Operation Dynamo (the evacuation of the BEF from Dunkirk in late May 1940) meant they could not be withdrawn from front line service quickly and so saw combat in small numbers in North Africa, where reliability and suspension performance in the desert conditions was praised. Sixty worn out examples were also taken to Greece by the 3rd Royal Tank Regiment and although they performed well against the German tanks, over 90% were lost due to mechanical breakdowns as opposed to enemy action (mainly through broken tracks).

As war broke out, the British had placed into production the A13, a new faster Cruiser tank utilizing the suspension and running gear concepts of the American designer J. Walter Christie. This new suspension provided a fast, highly maneuverable design that became the basis for the rapid evolution of the Cruiser tank such as the Mk IV (A13 Mk II) a British cruiser tank derived from the original A13.

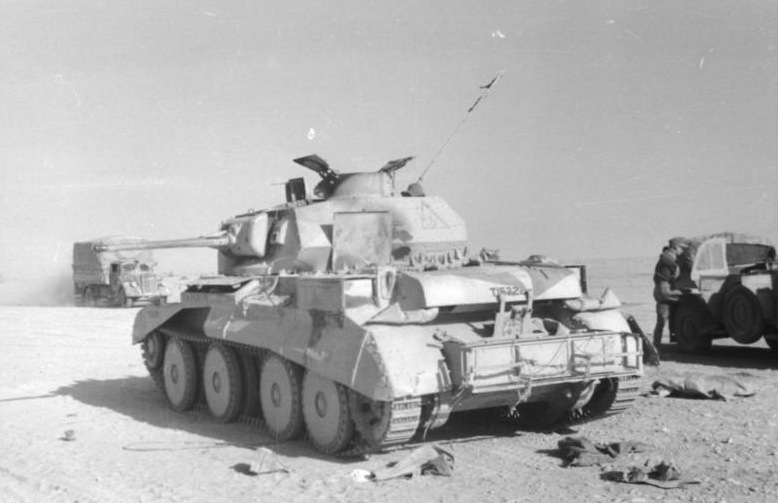
A Cruiser Mk IV tank destroyed in the North African Campaign

The A13 Cruiser was developed into the A15 Crusader then the A27 Cromwell. The use of the powerful Rolls-Royce Meteor engine, derived from the Rolls-Royce Merlin, gave the Cromwell high speed and mobility. The final British cruiser design to see service was the A34 Comet; development of the Cromwell, it carried a high-velocity 77 mm gun derived from the Ordnance QF 17-pounder anti-tank gun; one of the most effective Allied anti-tank guns of the war, although the Comet itself saw very little combat.

Beginning about mid-1942, many British tank units were equipped with vehicles supplied under lend-lease from the United States, such as the Stuart light tank, the Lee (or the British specification 'Grant' variant thereof) and the Lee's/Grant's replacement the Sherman (all these tanks received their names from the British, named after American Civil War generals; the Americans instead used their original alphanumeric designations almost exclusively until after the war). In late 1943, the British found a way to mount the QF 17-pounder anti-tank gun in the Sherman to create the Firefly, a tank with a more capable gun than the 75mm or 76mm gun normally fitted. From mid-1944, as more were produced and British designs were introduced into service the Firefly became increasingly the most common Sherman in use by the British.

==== Specialist tanks ====
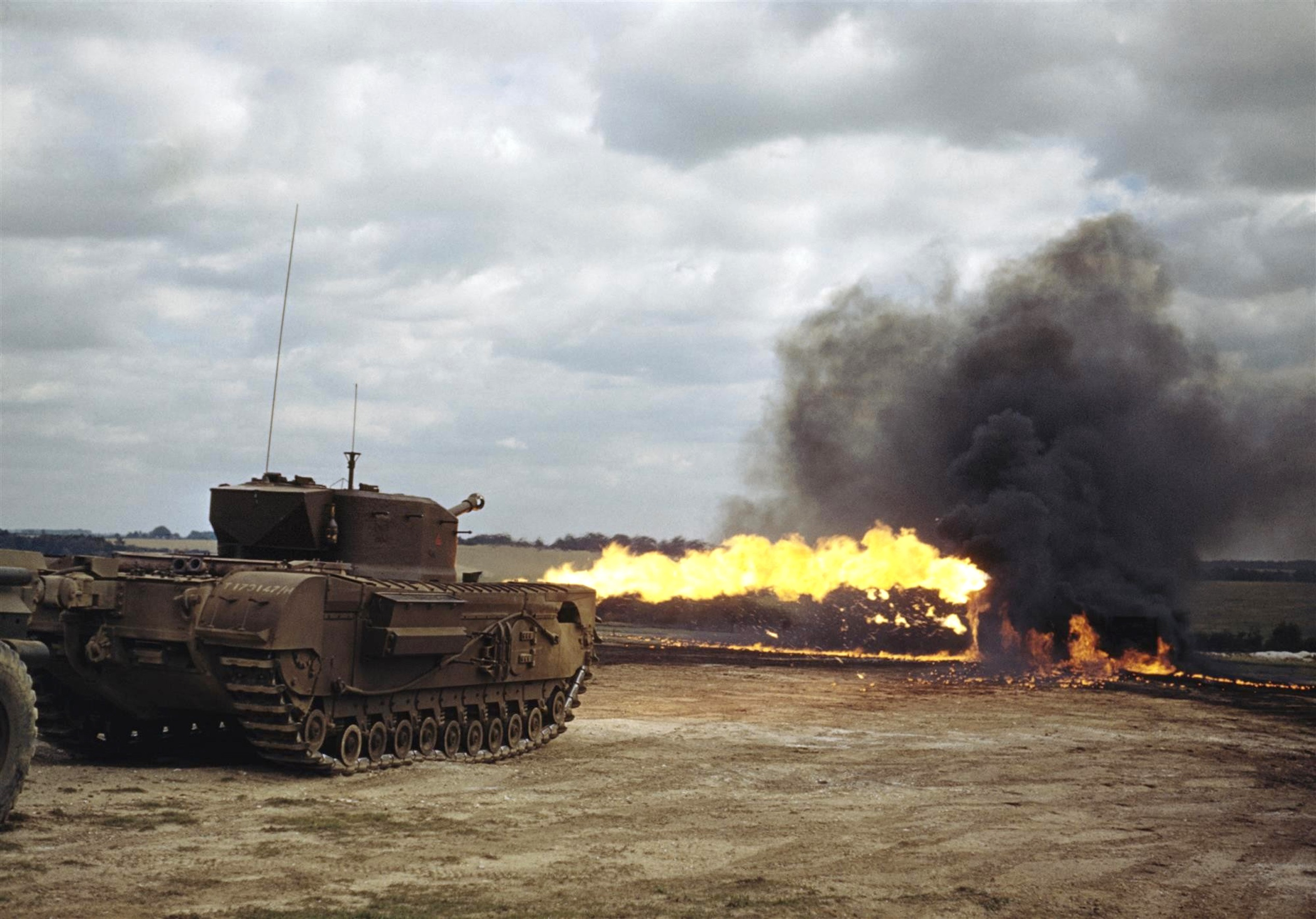
One of Hobart's Funnies a Churchill Crocodile tank in action

Immediately before and during the war, the British produced an enormous array of prototype tanks and modified tanks for a variety of specialist engineering tasks (such as "Hobart's Funnies", produced for the invasion of France in 1944).

For example, the Churchill Armoured Vehicle Royal Engineers (AVRE) fired a short range 230 mm (11.4 inch) direct-fire mortar which was used for destroying buildings and clearing obstacles. It could also be equipped with a wide variety of combat engineering equipment such as small bridges, rolled-matt roadways, fascines, and mine rollers.

Many of these ideas had already been tried, tested, or were in experimental development both by Britain and other nations. For example, the Scorpion flail tank (a modified Matilda II) had already been used during the North African campaign to clear paths through German minefields. Soviet T-34 tanks had been modified with mine-rollers, fascines, and flamethrowers. Close-support tanks, bridge layers, and fascine carriers had been developed elsewhere also. However, the Funnies were the largest and most elaborate collection of engineering vehicles available.

By early 1944, Hobart could demonstrate to Eisenhower and Montgomery a brigade each of swimming DD tanks, Crab mine clearers, and AVRE (Engineer) tanks along with a regiment of Crocodile flamethrowing tanks.

=== United States ===
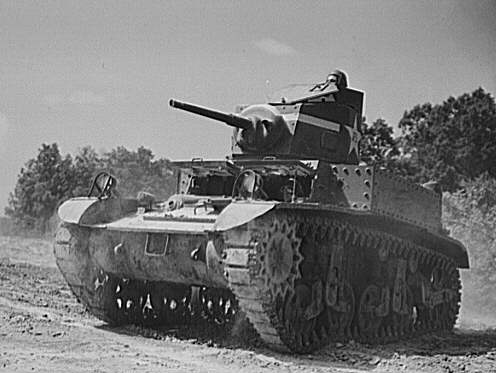
Light Tank M3 in Fort Knox, 1942

Prior to the entry of the United States into the war after the attack on Pearl Harbor in December 1941, the Army had only a few tanks. During the Louisiana Maneuvers in September 1941, it used trucks with the word "tank" painted on their side. Even after Pearl Harbor the 10th Armored Division did not have any tanks, so crews trained by marching down roads in groups and executing orders as if they were in tanks.

The Light Tank M2 series was the most important pre-war US tank. These light tanks were mechanically very reliable, with good mobility. However, they had a high silhouette — from the use of an air-cooled radial engine for power — and poor armor. Only a few saw combat, on Guadalcanal. Their importance lies in the fact that they formed the basis for the much more successful Light Tank M3 (a.k.a. 'Stuart' in British service) series beginning in 1941. The M3 Light Tank was an improvement of the M2 Light Tank, with heavier armor and a 37 mm gun. From the M3A1 version, this gun was gyrostabilized.

The new medium tank just entering production in 1940 was the M2 Medium Tank series. This was a poor design with thin armor, a high silhouette, a 37 mm main gun, and seven machine guns.

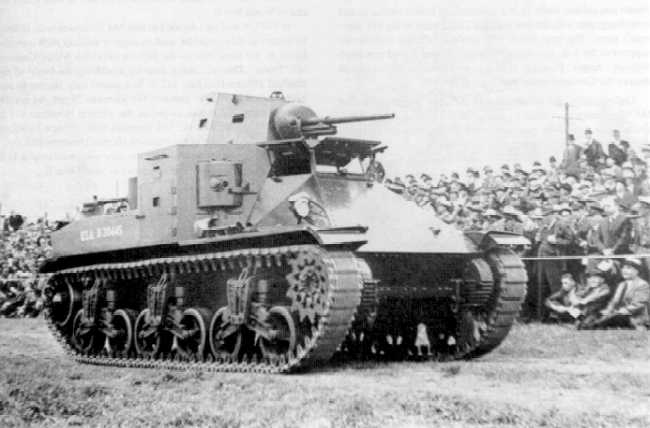
An M2A1 Medium Tank (late production series)

From 1940, new tank designs were prepared. The Battle of France had shown the importance of medium tanks. The British Army sought to have the US manufacture British designs, but the US refused, offering instead to share the output of US factories building US designs. The United States Army had a requirement for a medium tank with a 75 mm gun, and developed the M3 Medium Tank as an interim design. The medium M3 tank was intended to quickly get a 75 mm gun into the field, pending the design of a tank with a 75 mm gun in a fully rotating turret. The British rejected the design, only accepting after the US told them it was all they had to offer. The British then used the M3 Medium Tank for their own use as the 'Lee', and some with modifications to their requirements as the 'Grant' (I.e: they added a bulge in the back of the turret to fit a radio, among other things.).

By February 1942, American civilian automobile factories only made weapons and military vehicles. Automobile manufacturers such as General Motors and Chrysler used their experience with mass production to quickly build tanks. The country manufactured as many tanks in the first half of 1942 as in all of 1941, with 1,500 in May 1942 alone. American production not only equipped its forces, but through Lend Lease also supplied all the tank needs of the free French (after 1942) and Chinese. By 1944 most British units were also equipped with US-built tanks. Finally, the US supplied over 8,000 tanks to the USSR, half of them the M4 Sherman. Similar to the Soviet Union, the United States selected a few good basic designs and standardized those models. Given the lack of tank design and production experience, it is remarkable that the United States' designs were as good as they were.

The first tanks of the United States to see combat were the Light Tank M3. They were deeply flawed in many ways, yet the M3 Light ("Stuart") and M3 Medium ("Lee" or "Grant") were the best tanks available to the Western Allies and were superior to many of their German counterparts in armor protection and firepower. The Light Tank M3 was about as well-armed as the British cruiser tanks with 2-pounder (40 mm) guns in the desert, yet was much more reliable mechanically. Its 37 mm main gun was more powerful than the main guns carried by German reconnaissance tanks. The name given by the British to the Light Tank M3 was 'Stuart'; a nickname used was 'Honey'. The M3 and its improved derivative, the Light Tank M5 series, remained in service throughout the war. By 1943, its 37 mm gun was obsolete, but no better replacement was available. The Light Tank T7 design was proposed as a successor in 1943, armed with a 57 mm gun and with better armor; however, the design was never standardized for production.

The appearance of the M3 "Lee" medium tank in the summer of 1942 finally gave the British a larger supply of medium tanks than they could otherwise have hoped for. Although poorly designed, with a very high profile, it was produced in great numbers and was very effective when engaging targets other than enemy tanks, such as infantry and gun positions.

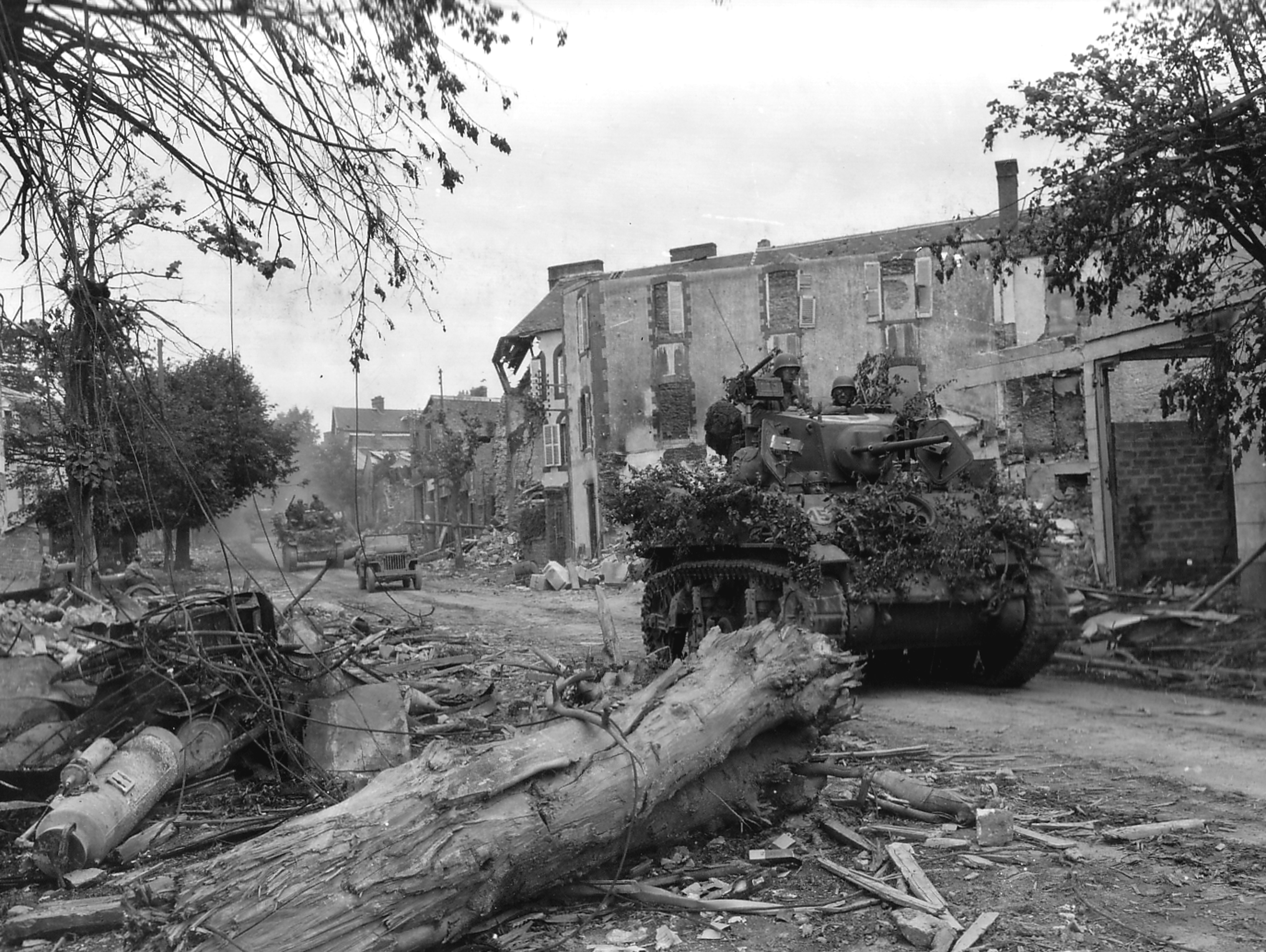
Light Tank M5 (a.k.a. M5 Stuart) passes through the wrecked streets of Coutances in Normandy

The M4A1, A2 and A3 compared

The M3 Medium had the significant disadvantage of its 75 mm main armament being mounted offset in the hull meaning that it could not take hull down cover and use its main gun at the same time. It had a fully traversable turret with a 37 mm cannon as well, but the turret combined with a hull gun gave it a very tall profile. The United States 1st Armored Division also employed the M3 Medium in Africa. It was a stopgap solution, never intended to be a design of major importance. In American and British service the M3 Medium was phased out at the end of the North African campaign. It continued to serve in the Red Army for some time, and in a single campaign in the Pacific. Red Army crews nicknamed it "grave for seven brothers" referring to the seven-man crew.

The most important American design of the war was the M4 Medium Tank, or "Sherman" in British service. The M4 Medium became the second-most-produced tank of World War II, and was the only tank to be used by virtually all Allied forces (thanks to the American lend-lease program); approximately 40,000 M4 Mediums were produced during the war. M4s formed the main tank of American, British, Canadian, French, Polish, and Chinese units. The M4 was the equal of the German medium tanks, the Panzer III and Panzer IV, at the time it first saw service in 1942. The Red Army was supplied with about 4,000 M4s. The M4, although reliable and easy to maintain, was already outgunned by the time the US encountered the up-gunned and up-armored German medium tanks in Italy and Northern Europe (the Panzer IV and various German self-propelled guns) and by late 1943 the arrival of German Panther and Tiger I were even graver threats due to the range, accuracy and penetrating power of their main guns. While it is commonly believed that the Sherman had a tendency to explode catastrophically due to their use of petrol fuel, this is incorrect (almost all tanks used petrol in WWII, excepting Soviet tanks). The Sherman suffered from poor ammunition storage. Welded-on appliqué armor and water jackets were added to combat the problem. A U.S. Army study in 1945 concluded that 60–80 percent of the older dry-stowage and 10–15 percent of wet-stowage Shermans burned when penetrated. The Sherman gained grim nicknames such as "Tommycooker" from the Germans, who called British soldiers "Tommies".

Technically, the M4's design was capable of handling larger guns than the 75 mm and 76 mm guns with which they left the factory. The British fitted Shermans with the more powerful Ordnance Quick Firing 17 pounder (76.2 mm) gun, a variant known informally as the Firefly. By the time of the Normandy campaign, the M4 had become the workhorse tank of the Allied forces. Some M4 Mediums were equipped with the Duplex Drive system (Sherman DD), which allowed them to swim using a collapsible screen and inflated rubber tubes. Along with this were the M4 Dozer (an M4 with a bulldozer blade), the T34 Calliope (mounting a multiple rocket launcher above the turret), the M4A3R3 Flame thrower (flame tank), and the Sherman Crab Mark I (an M4 Medium with a mine flail), as well as many other variants.

The United States eventually deployed the Light Tank M24, an improvement over the M3 Light Tank. The M24 had torsion-bar suspension, high mobility, and a compact 75 mm gun. Ergonomically the tank was quite good also. However, the M24 did not appear in combat until December 1944 and equipped only a few units by the end of the war.

Near the end of the war, the M26 Pershing tank was deployed as the first operational heavy tank of the US Army. It was designated a heavy tank when it was designed in WWII due to its 90 mm gun, which was at the time the largest caliber gun found on a US tank. The Pershing was a very modern design with torsion-bar suspension, heavy armor, and an excellent 90 mm gun. However, it was somewhat underpowered, having the same Ford GAA engine as the M4A3. Intended as an improvement of the M4 Sherman, the prolonged time of development meant that only a small number saw combat in the European theater, most notably in the 9th Armored Division's dramatic dash to take the Bridge at Remagen. In combat, it was, unlike the M4 Sherman, fairly equal in firepower and protection to both the Tiger I and Panther tanks. The M26 basic design was good enough to form the basis for all postwar American tanks through the end of the M60 series.

=== France ===
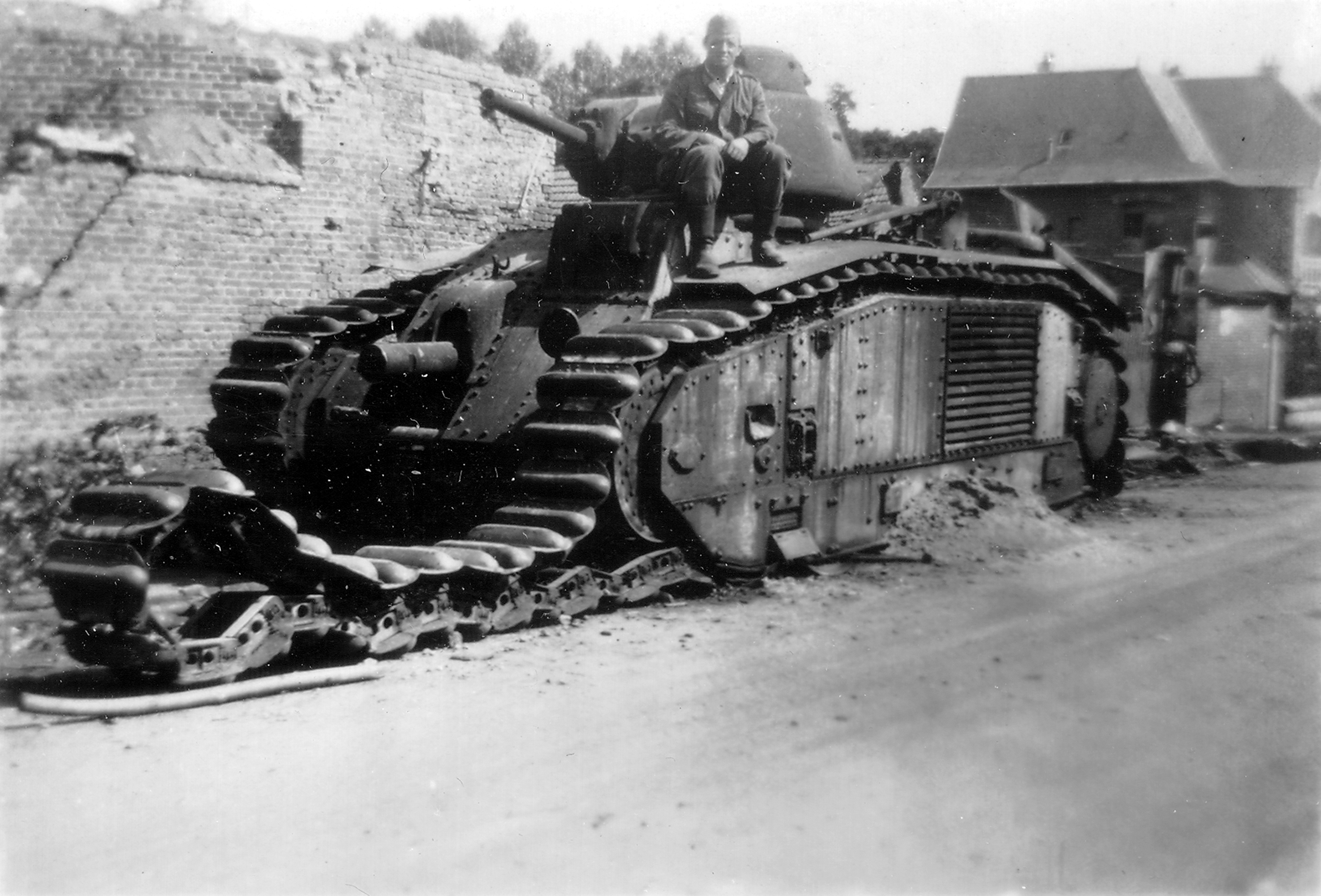
A Char B1 infantry tank in 1940 in Northern France

At the start of the war, France had one of the largest tank forces in the world along with the Soviet, British, and German forces. Like the British and the Soviets, the French operated two classes of tank: cavalry tanks and infantry tanks.

The French had planned for a defensive war and built tanks accordingly. Their infantry tanks were heavily armored. But, also, generally, they were relatively sluggish, and operationally in terms of control of their forces, the French were at a disadvantage and were outmaneuvered by the German forces. When the French were able to mount an attack their tanks could be very effective. On 16 May, during the Battle of France a single Char B1 heavy tank, the Eure, attacked and destroyed thirteen German tanks lying in ambush in Stonne, all of them Panzer IIIs and Panzer IVs, in the course of a few minutes. The tank safely returned despite being hit 140 times (this event is not verifiable in German documents and relies on the statements of the crew). In his book Panzer Leader, Heinz Guderian wrote of a tank battle south of Juniville:

While the tank battle was in progress, I attempted, in vain, to destroy a Char B with a captured 47 mm [1.9-inch] anti-tank gun; all the shells I fired at it simply bounced harmlessly off its thick armor. Our 37 mm and 20 mm guns were equally ineffective against this adversary. As a result, we inevitably suffered sadly heavy casualties.

The total tank assets in France and its colonies were perhaps less than 5,800 during the time of the German offensive. After the armistice in the unoccupied Free Zone of France, a clandestine rebuild took place of 225 GMC Trucks into armored cars. When all of France was occupied in 1942, the secret hiding places were betrayed to the Germans.

=== Germany ===
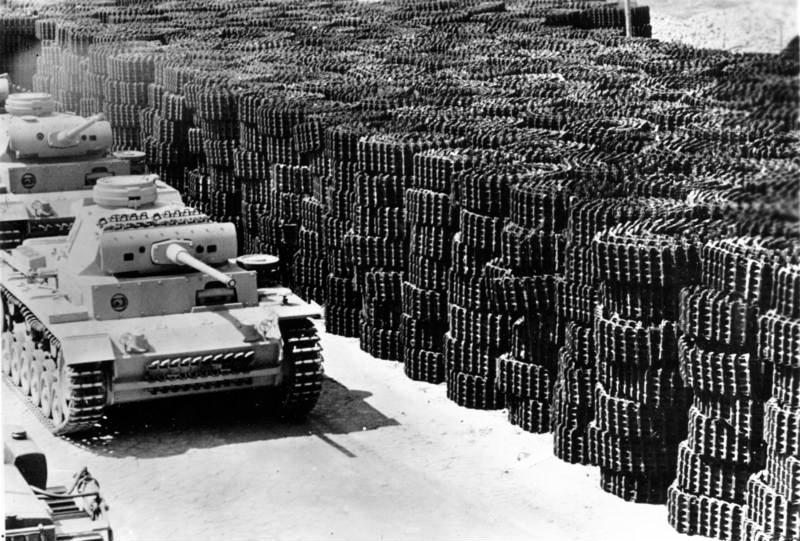
Panzer IIIs move off the factory grounds, 1942.

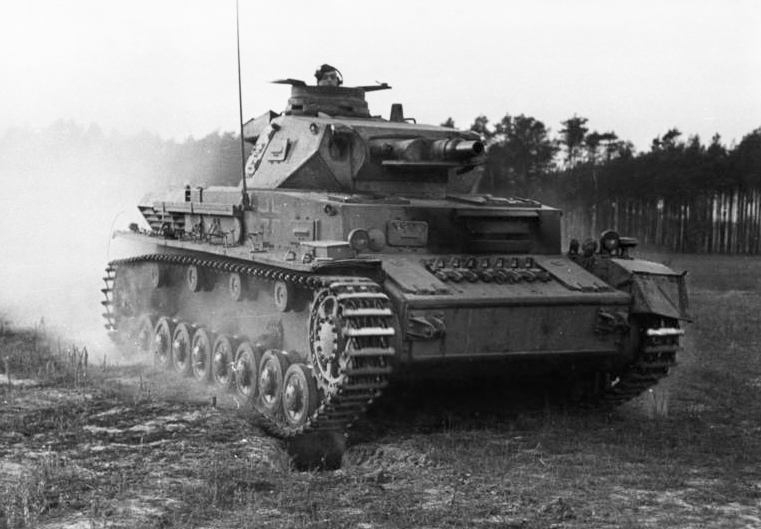
Panzer IV Ausf. C

Germany's armored force was not especially impressive from a technical standpoint at the start of the war. As noted above, it was their advanced combined arms doctrine and unrivaled command-and-control capability that gave German mechanized forces their advantage on the battlefield.

Pre-war plans called for two main tanks: the main tank was to be the Panzer III medium tank, supported by smaller numbers of the howitzer-armed Panzer IV. However, by the beginning of the invasion of Poland, only a few hundred of these vehicles were available. As a result, the invasions of Poland and France were carried out primarily with the less capable Panzer I and Panzer II light tanks (armed with machine guns and a 20 mm autocannon respectively), with some gun-armed light tanks of Czechoslovak design (Panzer 35(t) and Panzer 38(t), both armed with a 37 mm gun). Even in 1941, Panzer III production amounted only to about a thousand tanks, forcing the Germans to use Czech tanks as substitutes for the Panzer III. As the war proceeded, the production of heavier tanks increased.

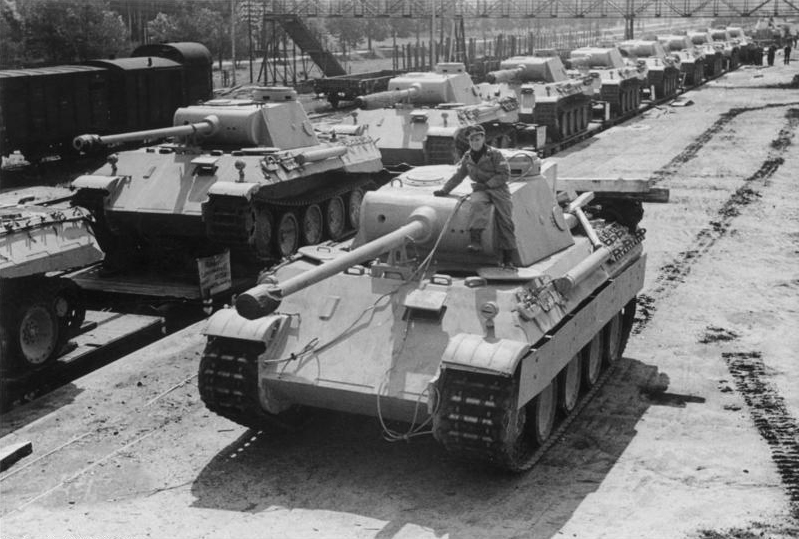
Panzer V Panther Ausf. D tanks, 1943

The Panzer III was intended to fight other tanks; in the initial design stage, a 50 mm (2 inch) gun was specified. However, the infantry at the time was being equipped with the 37 mm (1.46 inch) PaK 36, and it was thought that in the interest of standardization the tanks should carry the same armament. As a compromise, the turret ring was made large enough to accommodate a 50 mm (2 inch) gun should a future upgrade be required. This single decision later assured the Panzer III a prolonged life in the German Army.

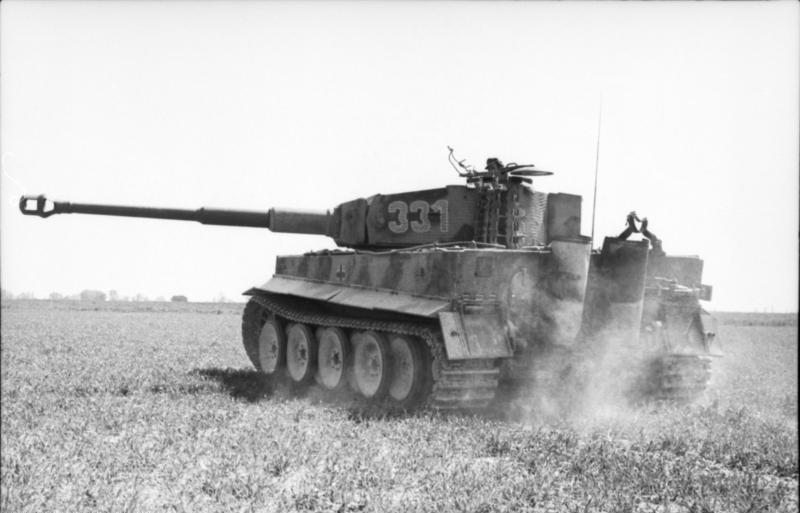
A Waffen-SS Tiger I tank in France

The Panzer IV was intended to carry a gun that could be used in support of infantry or other tanks, and was initially armed with a short-barreled 75 mm howitzer to fire high explosive (HE) fragmentation shells. In 1941 an average of 39 Panzer IV model tanks per month were built, and this rose to 83 in 1942, 252 in 1943, and 300 in 1944.

During Operation Barbarossa, it was discovered that the Soviet T-34 tank outclassed the Panzer III and IV. Its well sloped armor could withstand most German weapons, and its 76.2 mm gun and AP rounds could penetrate the armor of all German tanks. This forced the Germans to improve their existing models. The Panzer III, which was intended to be the main medium tank, was upgraded to a longer, higher-velocity 50 mm gun.

Thus the Panzer IV, originally intended to be a support tank, became the de facto main medium tank re-armed with a long-barreled, high-velocity 75 mm gun to counter the T-34; the Panzer III, with its smaller turret ring, could not mount a gun larger than 50 mm, which had become inadequate against Allied tanks. The Germans started to develop newer, heavier tanks. This included the Panzer V Panther, which was intended to be the new main German medium tank, with comparably sloped armor to that of the T-34. The Panther tank was a compromise of various requirements. While sharing essentially the same engine as the Tiger I tank, it had better frontal armor, better gun penetration, was lighter overall and thus faster, and could handle rough terrain better than the Tigers. The trade-off was much weaker side armor; the Panther proved to be deadly in open country and shooting from long range, but was vulnerable in close-quarters combat or to flank shots.

The Germans also started to develop a new series of heavy tanks. The first was the Tiger, which outclassed all its opponents in terms of firepower and armor when it was first put into operational use. The companies Henschel and Porsche both submitted designs for the Tiger, and the Henschel design was chosen. The even heavier Tiger II (deemed "King Tiger" by Allied troops) supplemented the Tiger I late in the war. Its powerful gun – and unlike the Tiger I, its very heavy sloped armor – made it superior to nearly every Allied or Soviet tank in a one-on-one confrontation, but poor mobility, speed, and reliability limited its use.

Plans were made for a super-heavy tank, the Panzer VII Löwe, which was canceled during the design stage in favor of the yet heavier Panzer VIII Maus of which only two incomplete prototypes were made. Panzer IX and Panzer X were drawings only used for propaganda purposes.

=== Italy ===
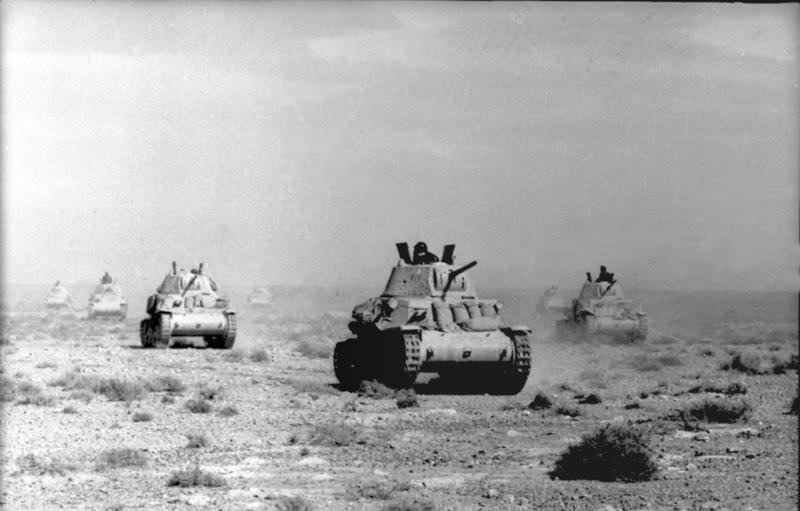
M13/40 tanks in the desert, April 1941

The Italian army was mainly equipped with tankettes of the L3 series in the 1930s, and these, armed with machine guns, formed the main armor strength of Italy as late as 1940. Italy began fielding heavier tanks beginning with the Fiat M11/39 with a 37 mm the main gun in 1940. This tank and its derivatives, the M13/40, M14/41 and the M15/42 (all with 47 mm main guns) were closely comparable in combat power to light tanks such as the Soviet T-26. A heavier design, the P40 with a 75 mm main gun, was designed but saw no service with Italian forces as it became ready at the time of the Armistice of Cassibile with the Allies, after which the Germans took over production, and used roughly one hundred of them. Another tank design, the Fiat M16/43, was developed to match the British cruiser tanks but work on it was stopped when the Axis was pushed out of North Africa in May 1943.

The Fiat-Ansaldo M11/39 medium tank was used from 1940 through the early period of World War II. The M11/39 was developed as a "breakthrough tank" (Carro di Rottura). It was replaced by the Fiat-Ansaldo M13/40 medium tank which was used in the Greek campaign and in the North African Campaign. The M13/40 was not used on the Eastern Front; Italian forces there were equipped only with Fiat L6/40s and Semovente 47/32 tank destroyers. Armament was sufficient for 1940–41, but did not keep up with the increased armor and firepower on Allied or German tanks and anti-tank guns; its engine was underpowered and unreliable, a condition worsened by the harsh desert climate and the initial lack of training of their crews. Beginning in 1942, the Italian Army recognized the firepower weakness of the M13/40 series and employed the Semovente 75/18 self-propelled gun alongside the tanks in their armored units, which proved capable of destroying the enemy medium tanks.

The next tank in the series was the Fiat M14/41, a slightly improved version of the M13/40 with a more powerful diesel engine. The tank was also employed in the North African Campaign. Following the withdrawal of Italian forces from North Africa the M14/41 was rarely encountered. A few captured M11, M13, and M14s were pressed into service by British and Australian forces to fill the serious shortage of allied tanks in 1941.

The next in the series was the M15/42, a 15-tonne tank first built in January 1943. Some 90 vehicles were built before the Italian armistice in September 1943 and in connection to that event they were used in the battle against the Germans by the 132nd Armoured Division Ariete in Rome. After that point, they were confiscated and used by the Germans who also built another 28 M15/42 tanks. It had a more powerful engine and air filters to cope with the harsh conditions of the desert, and an improved version of the 47 mm gun; however, by the time it entered production it was already obsolete.

==== Italian tank classification ====
Italy introduced a new tank classification scheme in 1938. Tanks were designated first with a letter (L, M, or P, for light, medium, or heavy respectively) followed by the weight in tonnes, separated by a slash followed by the year the tank was accepted for service. The classes of light, medium and heavy differed somewhat from other countries. Hence the P26/40, designated as "heavy" by the Italians with its 26-tonne weight, was more similar in weight to the medium M4 Sherman tank (30-tonne weight). The Italians also labeled the machine gun-armed L3/35 a "light tank", although it is more commonly called a tankette.

=== Japan ===
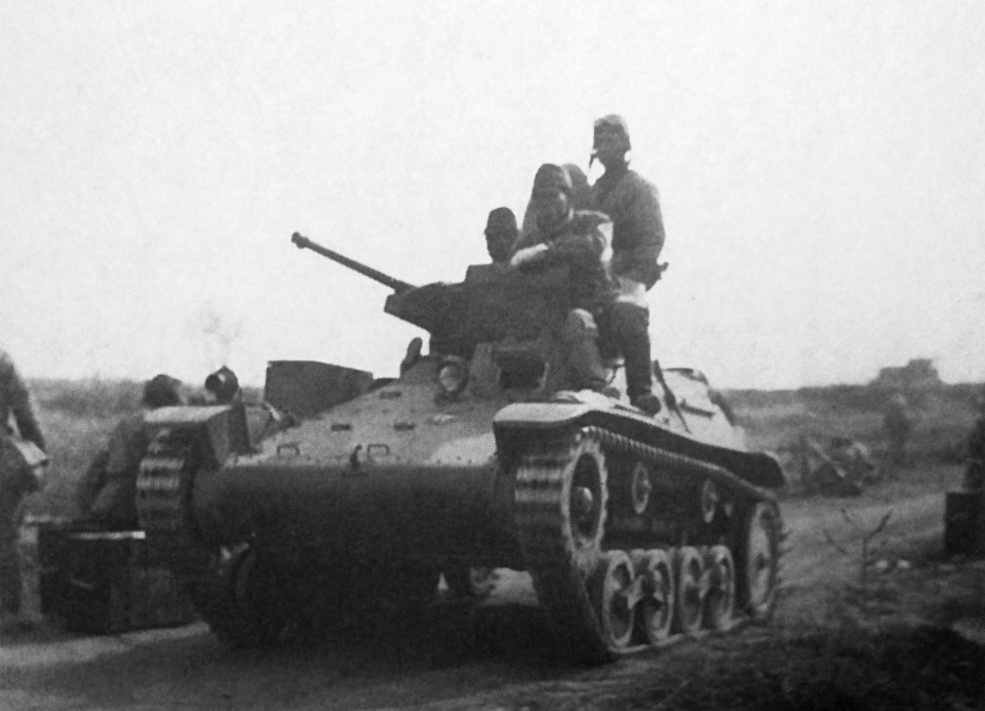
Type 97 Te-Ke tankette in China

Like the US Army (which utilized French and British tanks in World War I), the Imperial Japanese Army (IJA) did not have tanks of its own in World War I, so it started out by purchasing foreign tanks for evaluation during World War I and right after the war ended. Like many other nations, the Japanese initially didn't embrace the tank, as it didn't have the cavalry tradition. Cavalry was used for reconnaissance in the mountainous countryside, and initially, as with most other armies, the first designs were constrained by the tank's infantry-support role. Building tanks of their own met several problems, as Japan's priority tended to be with naval procurements so production for tank steel was on a lower level. However, they finally began designing tanks by the mid-1920s. Inspired by European designs, the Japanese tank program designed and developed the tanks which facilitated their campaigns in China and the Soviet–Japanese border conflicts, prior to World War II. They introduced many innovations as they built their designs, including bell crank suspensions, as pioneers in amphibious tanks, and the use of diesel engines that were less likely to catch fire compared with gasoline tank engines that were being used at the time. The Japanese generals had made a mistake in their assessment of the tanks used against China, a country whose army had only three tank battalions, and few anti-tank weapons.

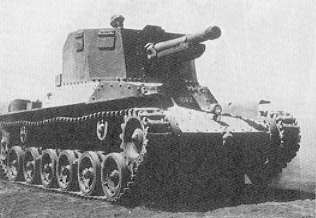
Type 1 Ho-Ni II variant with a 105 mm gun

By 1937, Japan fielded 1,060 tanks in 8 regiments, most designed for and used in the infantry-support role. But this focus left the IJA without a tank capable of taking on other tanks, a deficiency that was brought home hard during the Battle of Khalkin-Gol, a decisive defeat inflicted by the Soviet Union on the Mongolian border in 1939. This proved fatal later when they faced the new generation of Allied tanks, as the great majority of the Japanese models were lightly armored, and not heavily gunned. As in the 1920s, with the priority of steel going to the navy and air force, the Japanese Army has relegated the remaining material for its tanks. Thus the 1930s-designed vehicles went on being mass-produced, and the warning of Khalkin-Gol was too slowly recognized. By 1940 they had the fifth-largest tank force in the world behind the Soviet Union, France, Britain, and Germany, but were behind in medium and heavy tanks. However, after December 1941, with the entry of the United States into the conflict, priority continued to be given to warships and aircraft, weapons that were more conducive to naval warfare; attacking across the Pacific, and defending the Empire from the advancing Americans.

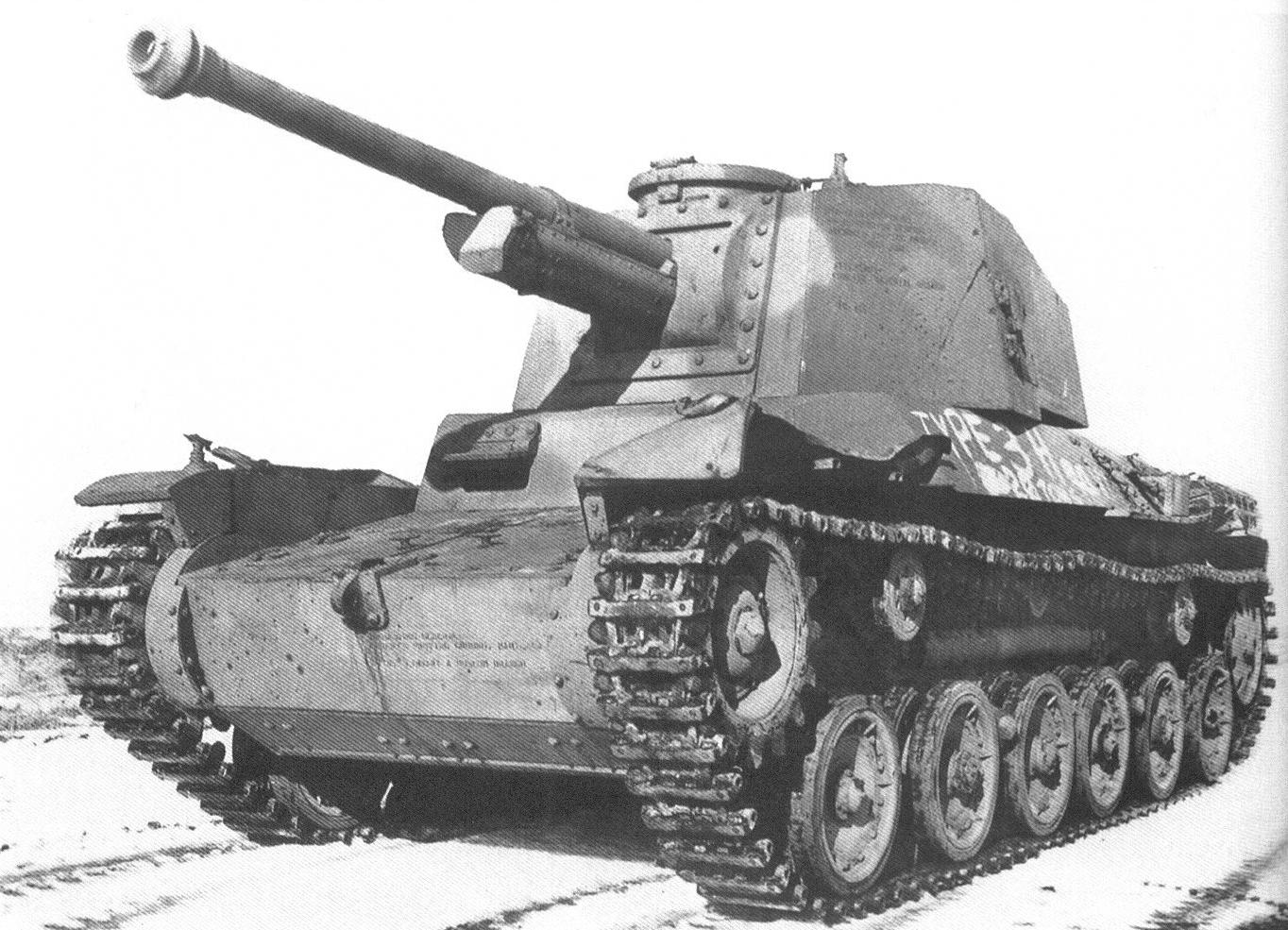
Type 3 Chi-Nu

Although the Japanese Army widely employed tanks within the Pacific theater of war, the tanks that Allied forces faced there were mostly older designs, such as the Type 95 Ha-Go light tank and Type 97 Chi-Ha medium tank. As the war progressed the Japanese built tanks and self-propelled guns to match up against the Allied tanks. These included the Type 1 Ho-Ni I tank destroyer with a 75 mm gun designed as self-propelled artillery and the Type 2 Ho-I infantry support tank, for the close-fire support role; providing Type 97 equipped tank regiments with additional firepower against the enemy armored fighting vehicles. However, they were only produced in limited numbers. The most modern Japanese tanks, such as the Type 3 Chi-Nu medium tank were delayed by material and production shortages. Even after they started to come out of the factories, a doctrine called for them to be held for the defense of the mainland against invasion.

Between 1931 and 1945, Japan produced 6450 tanks. Half of them (3300) were made by the Mitsubishi Company. The sub-total of tanks produced between 1940 and 1945 is 4424, i.e. a yearly average comparable to Italy. For a country as large and as industrialized as Japan, that is modest. However, before 1944/45, the naval fleet and the air force had priority of steel allocation and construction. It changed when the homeland became increasingly under direct threat, but it was too late. As with many innovative weapons projects during the final years of World War II, production could not advance beyond either small numbers or the prototype stage due to material shortages, and the loss of Japan's industrial infrastructure to the Allied bombing of Japan.

== Tanks of other combatants ==
=== Romania ===
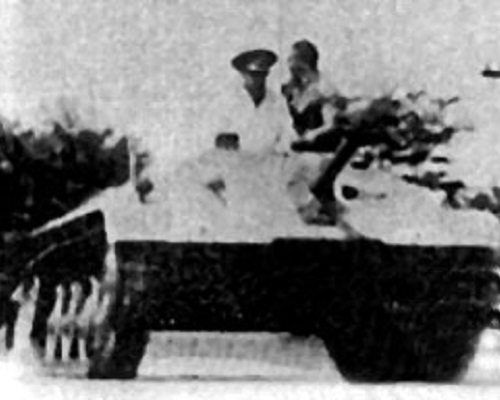
The Romanian Mareșal tank destroyer was developed starting in 1942 and is stated to have inspired the Hetzer's design.

During the interwar period, Romania had equipped its army with tanks from its Czechoslovak and French allies. The vehicles acquired by Romania were, however, different in many aspects from their original Czechoslovak and French counterparts. For example, the R-1, which was also built in Romania under license, had a different engine and armor thickness than other AH-IV variants. The R-2 (Romanian designation of the LT vz. 35) had a modified variant, the R-2c, with cemented armor and a different looking rear for both the turret and the hull. French Renault R35s were also acquired – their suspension was later heavily modified, so the wheels were ten times more durable.

Romania joined the Axis Powers in 1941, so its vehicles fought against the Soviet army on the Eastern Front. They were used in places like Odesa and Stalingrad. The Romanian interwar-developed tank force proved to be hardly effective against Soviet T-34s and KV-1s; during tests, it was found out that the T-34 was invulnerable to the R-2's 37 mm gun. However, Romania did upgrade its tank force with German designs such as Panzer IIIs, Panzer IVs, and StuG IIIs, referred to in the Romanian army as T-3, T-4 and TAs respectively.

To further increase its anti-tank capacities, Romania had also started its own production of tank destroyers in late 1942. These included the Mareșal, TACAM T-60, TACAM R-2 and VDC R35, the first of which was started by Wehrmacht officials to have inspired the German Hetzer's design. Attempts were also made to produce medium tanks, such as the R-3 and a later tank project comparable in characteristics to the T-34; neither of them is known to have passed the proposal stage. Heavy modifications were also suggested for captured T-34s (see here).

=== Czechoslovakia ===
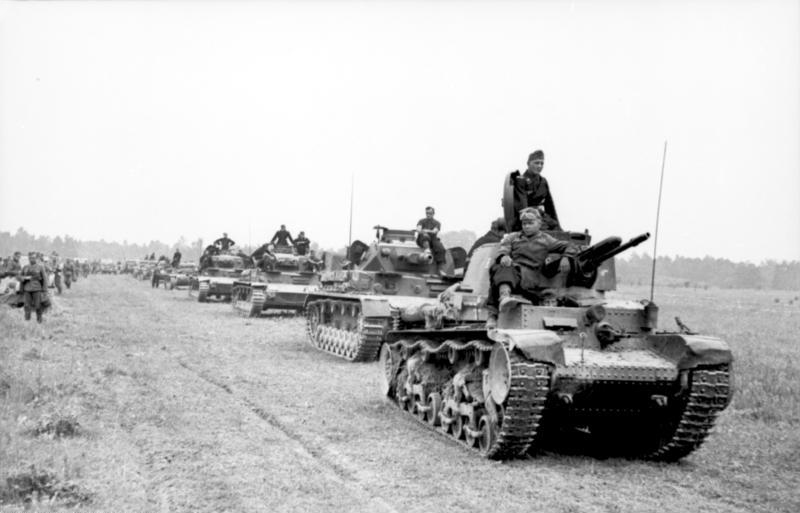
The LT vz. 35 designated as Panzer 35(t) by Germans in France, 1940

By the time of the Sudeten crisis, the Czechoslovak army used a complement of light tanks including 298 LT vz. 35 designed by Škoda, as well as 50 LT vz. 34 built by ČKD; 150 LT vz. 38 were ordered but none were delivered before the German occupation. The LT-35 and LT-38 models were superior to the Panzer I and Panzer II light tanks used in the Wehrmacht, so the Germans ordered the production of these models to be resumed.

Before the end of production in 1942, 136 more LT-35 and a total of 1414 LT-38 were produced for the Wehrmacht at Škoda Works; these tanks saw operational use in the Polish campaign, the Battle of France, and on the Soviet front. By 1942, Czech-built tanks became progressively vulnerable to Soviet T-34 medium tanks and new anti-tank guns and the LT-35 and LT-38 proved unsuitable for harsh winter conditions in Russia, so they were withdrawn from front line service in 1942; the remaining units were either redeployed in a light reconnaissance role or converted to Hetzer tank destroyers and artillery tractors.

=== Poland ===
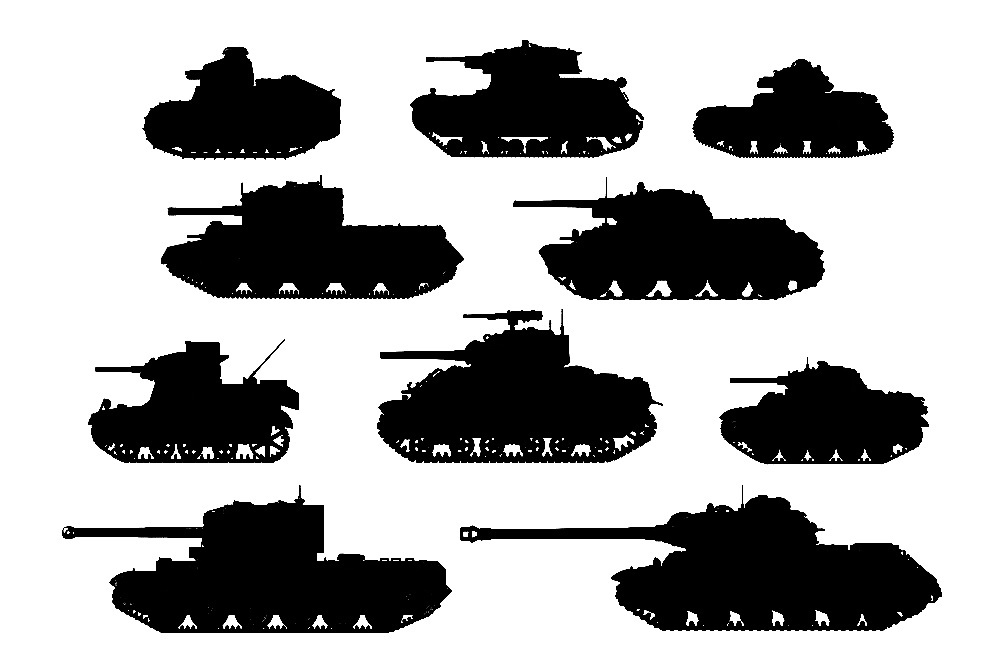
all tanks operated in combat by Polish forces during WW2

Poland was the first to suffer the German Blitzkrieg, but it had some very good tanks in its armored forces. The most important was the 7TP (siedmiotonowy Polski – "7-tonne Polish") light tank, which was better armed than its most common opponents, the German Panzer I and Panzer II.

Like the similar Soviet T-26, the 7TP was a development of the British Vickers 6-ton (Mk. E) which the Poles purchased and licensed for local production. The main new features of 7TP were: a better, more reliable and powerful diesel engine (which made the 7TP world's first diesel tank), 37 mm anti-tank gun, and slightly thicker armor (17 mm in front instead of 13 mm). Only about 132 tanks were produced between 1935 and the outbreak of the war. The weight increased after the initial 7-tonne prototype was made and the actual serial tanks weighed 9.9 tonnes.

Like its British predecessor, the 7TP was initially produced in two variants: the twin turret version armed with 2 Ckm wz.30 machine guns, and a single turret version, armed with a 37 mm (1.5 in) Bofors wz. 37 gun. After initial tests, it became clear that the twin-turret variant was obsolete and lacked firepower, so it was abandoned in favor of the more-modern, single-turret design.

Poland also had the TK tankette (also known as the TK-3) which was based upon an improved chassis of the British Carden Loyd tankette. The 575 TK/TKS tankettes formed the bulk of the Polish armored forces but as their armament was limited to machine guns, their combat value was limited. They suffered heavy losses during the Invasion of Poland. Only the handful of tankettes armed with 20 mm guns had a fighting chance against the enemy tanks; in one instance on 18 September 1939 a 20 mm gunned TKS destroyed three German Panzerkampfwagen 35(t) tanks.

All of the 7TP tanks took part in combat in the Polish Defensive War of 1939. Most of them were attached to two light tank battalions (the 1st and the 2nd). It is a paradox that the Polish motorized unit that performed the best had only 16 old Vickers E 6-ton tanks and 4 tankettes with 20 mm autocannon, 10th Motorized Cavalry Brigade (Poland).

Poland also purchased and used, in September 1939, 50 (some sources claim 49) Renault R35 tanks but due to extremely rugged terrain and the tank's poor cross-country performance, many ended up destroyed by the crews. 34 tanks crossed into Romania after covering the Polish retreat after the Soviet Invasion of Poland on 17SEP39 and 2 crossed into Hungary. Only about half of the Renault tanks participated in the actual fighting.

Polish forces in exile after the fall of Poland were reequipped by their allies. Polish LWP forces fighting alongside the Red Army were equipped with T-34, T-70, and IS-2 tanks, along with ISU-122 and SU-76 self-propelled guns. Polish forces in the west were equipped out of British stocks including M3 and M5 Stuarts, M4 Shermans, and a small number of Cromwells. Polish armor units were participants in the Battle of Berlin and played an important role in the campaign in Normandy.

== See also ==
- 759th Tank Battalion (United States)
- History of the tank
- Assault gun
- Tank destroyer
- Tanks in World War I
- Comparison of World War I tanks
- Tanks of the interwar period
- Light tanks of the United Kingdom
- Rhino tank
- Cold War Tanks
- Post-Cold War Tanks
