= Kenneth Althaus =

American general (1895–1987)

Kenneth G. Althaus Sr.
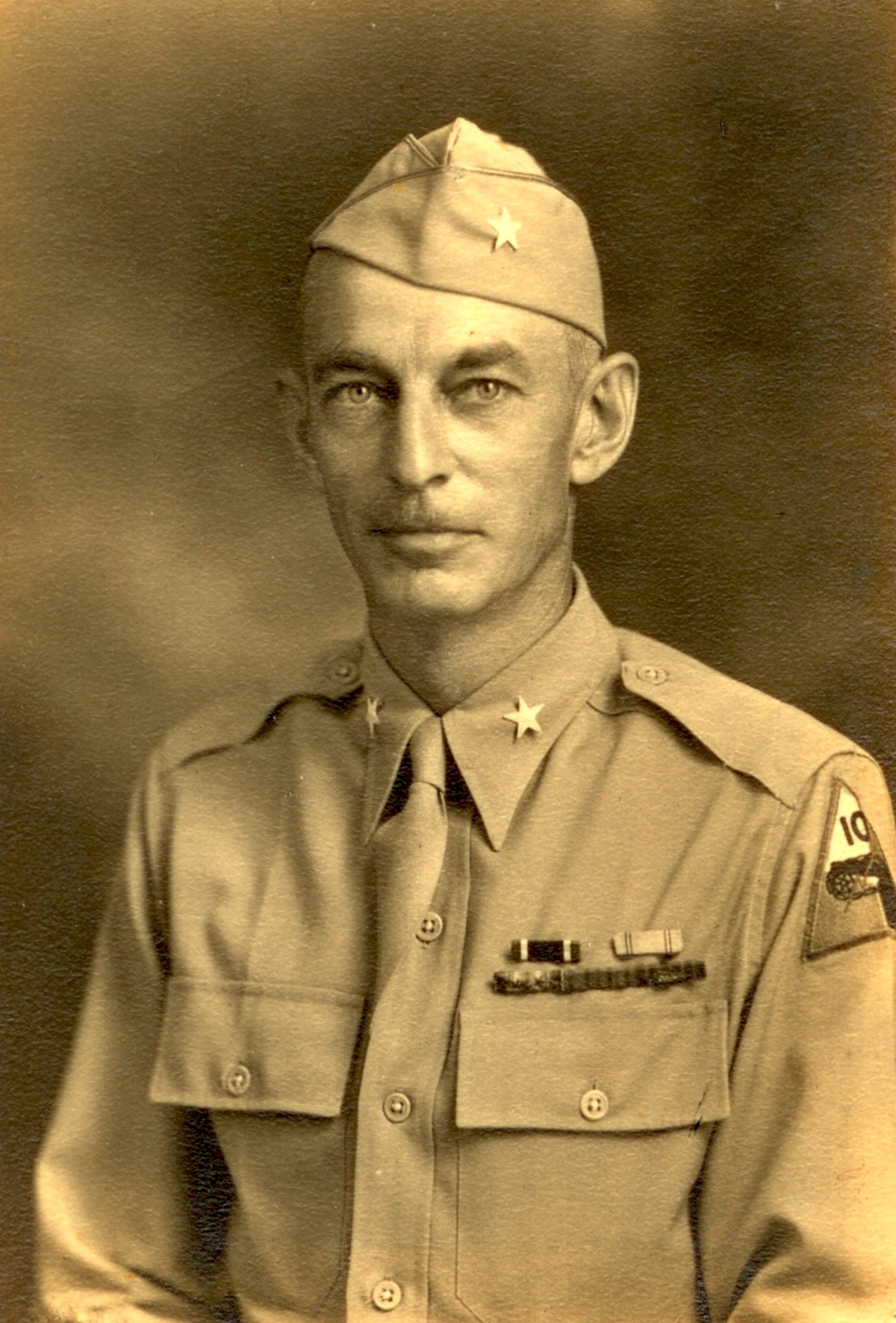
- BG Kenneth G. Althaus, USA
- Born: June 13, 1895; Cincinnati, Ohio, U.S.
- Died: June 9, 1987 (aged 91); Ocala, Florida, U.S.
- Military career
- Allegiance: United States
- Branch: United States Army
- Service years: 1916–1946
- Rank: Brigadier general
- Service number: 0-6208
- Unit: Infantry Branch
- Commands: Tank Destroyer School, Camp Hood; Combat Command A, 10th Armored Division; 11th Armored Regiment; 759th Tank Battalion
- Conflicts: World War I; Battle of Saint-Mihiel; Battle of the Lys and the Escaut; Meuse–Argonne offensive; World War II; Battle of Metz
- Awards: Bronze Star Medal; French Croix de Guerre; Belgian Croix de Guerre

Kenneth George Althaus Sr. (June 13, 1895 – June 9, 1987) was a Brigadier general in the United States Army during World War II. A veteran of several campaigns of World War I, he was first involved with armored forces of the United States Army from late 1920s and later commanded several early tank units including 759th Tank Battalion or 11th Armored Regiment.

Althaus rose to the general's rank and distinguished himself as Commander, Combat Command A, 10th Armored Division during Battle of Metz within Lorraine campaign. He was relieved of command due to medical reasons in mid-December 1944 and returned to the United States for training assignment. Althaus completed his career as Commandant, Tank Destroyer School, Camp Hood, Texas.

== Early career ==
Kenneth G. Althaus was born on June 13, 1893, in Cincinnati, Ohio as the son of William V. Althaus and his wife Hanna. His father worked as a carpenter and was of swiss descent. He graduated from the Hughes High School in Cincinnati in May 1913 and enrolled the Queen City College (predecessor of the University of Cincinnati). Althaus entered the Ohio National Guard on August 7, 1916 as second lieutenant and was assigned to the Company F, 1st Ohio Infantry at Camp Sherman, Ohio. He assumed command of his company shortly thereafter and was promoted to first lieutenant on December 15, 1916 and to Captain on June 27, 1917.

Following the American entry into World War I, Althaus' unit was called up for Federal service and transformed into Company F, 147th Infantry Regiment, a part of 37th Division. He was mustered into Federal service as Captain and transferred to the headquarters company of 145th Infantry Regiment, also a part of 37th Division. Althaus served as Regimental Assistant Adjutant, participating in the training in Cincinnati, Ohio and Montgomery, Alabama. He was promoted to Assistant Operations Officer (G-3) in the headquarters of 37th Division under Major general Charles S. Farnsworth and embarked for France in June 1918.

While in that capacity, Althaus took part in the combat operations against German forces in Baccarat Defensive sector, Meuse–Argonne offensive, Saint-Mihiel, Ypres-Lys offensive, and Escaut River offensive and received French Croix de Guerre with Palm and Belgian War Cross.

Following the Armistice he took part in the occupation duty in Germany while he served on the staff of French General Jean Degoutte on his headquarters in Aachen. He later served as a member of the Serbian Mission of the War Damage Board before returned to the United States in March 1919.

== Interwar period ==
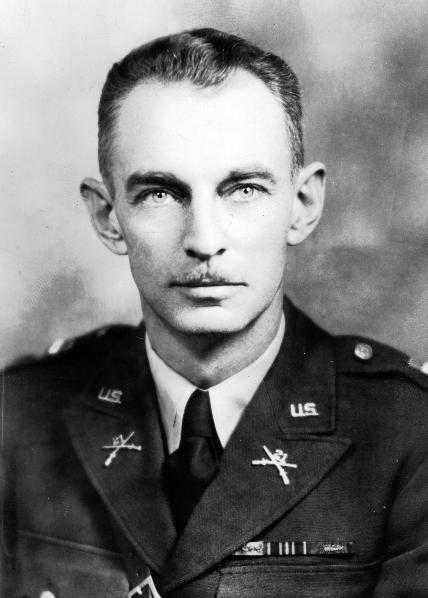
Captain Althaus while served with 21st Infantry in Hawaii in 1932.

Upon his return stateside, Althaus was honorably discharged from Federal service on April 5, 1919 and resumed his duty with Ohio National Guard. However he applied for the Regular Army commission and was accepted as Captain on July 1, 1920. He was assigned to 2nd Infantry Regiment at Camp Sherman, Ohio and transferred to the staff of Army Infantry School at Fort Benning, Georgia in August 1921. Althaus served under School's Commandant, Brigadier general Walter H. Gordon as his Assistant Adjutant, later being promoted to Adjutant. He remained in that capacity until September 1922, when he entered the Company Officers' course at the Infantry School which he completed following June.

Althaus then served as an Instructor of Reserve Officers' Training Corps summer training camp at Camp McClellan, Alabama for brief period before assumed duty as Assistant Professor of Military Science and Tactics at Alabama Polytechnic Institute in Auburn, Alabama. He was detached in August 1927 and ordered to Fort Leonard Wood, Missouri where he completed a Tank school in May 1928. He was then ordered back to Fort Benning and assigned to the headquarters company of 15th Tank Battalion under Major Sereno E. Brett. When the battalion was redesignated 2nd Battalion, 1st Tank Regiment on September 1, 1929, Althaus remained with the unit and also held additional duty as battalion football coach.

In September 1930, Althaus was ordered to the Army Command and General Staff School at Fort Leavenworth, Kansas for two-year course which he completed in June 1932. He was subsequently ordered to New Orleans, Louisiana where he joined the headquarters of 87th Division under Major general William S. McNair. Althaus served as his Assistant Adjutant only for three months and when general McNair retired from active duty in late September 1932, Althaus was transferred to Hawaii for service as Commanding officer of Company "D", 21st Infantry Regiment at Schofield Barracks. While in this capacity, his company stood first in the Hawaiian Division in the Howard Clark Trophy contest of 1932. During the Fleet Problem No. 14 in February and March 1933, Althaus served as a military observer aboard heavy cruiser Chicago.

In August 1933 he became the Assistant to Chief of Staff for Intelligence (G-2), Major James I. Muir at the Headquarters of Hawaiian Department at Fort Shafter, Hawaii and served in that capacity under Major general Briant H. Wells before returning to the United States in August 1935.

He was subsequently promoted to Major and appointed Professor of Military Science and Tactics at North Carolina State College of Agriculture and Engineering in Raleigh, North Carolina. Althaus held this assignment until his promotion to lieutenant colonel in July 1940, when he was transferred to 38th Infantry Regiment at Fort Sill, Oklahoma.

== World War II ==
In January 1941, Althaus was transferred to Fort Knox, Kentucky where he joined the headquarters of 1st Armored Division under Major general Bruce Magruder and took part in the training of personnel which became cadre for new armored divisions. In June that year, Althaus was tasked by Magruder to form the 759th Independent Tank Battalion at Fort Bliss, Texas as a training unit for tank specialists.

Following the Japanese Attack on Pearl Harbor and the United States entry into World War II, Althaus was ordered to the Army Field Artillery School at Fort Sill, Oklahoma and assumed duty as an Instructor of tactics. He was promoted to the temporary rank of Colonel on December 24, 1941. Althaus remained at Fort Sill until October 1942, when he was transferred to Fort Knox, Kentucky as Assistant Combat Commander of Combat Commander "E" at the Armored Force School.

In January 1943, Althaus became Commanding officer, 11th Armored Regiment at Fort Benning, Georgia. He led his regiment during the maneuvers in Tennessee Maneuver Area in early summer of that year and was promoted to the rank of Brigadier general on June 24, 1943. He subsequently joined the 10th Armored Division under Major general Paul Newgarden and assumed duty as Commander of Combat Command A.

Althaus accompanied his division overseas, arriving to the port of Cherbourg-en-Cotentin in late September 1944, he spent a next month of training at Teurtheville, France, before entering combat, as part of the Third Army under General George S. Patton. He distinguished himself during the breakthrough of German defenses in the vicinity of Metz and received Bronze Star Medal for his service. After fierce fighting, the 10th Armored Division moved to the Siegfried Line and Althaus took part in the advance of the Third Army into Germany in late November 1944.

Unfortunatelly he was relieved of command due to his physical condition and exhaustion on December 15, 1944. Althaus suffered from arthritic shoulder for several months and did not disclose his condition to Army doctors. Once overseas his condition was getting worse until he was unable to command his troops. Althaus returned to the United States in early February 1945 and spent several weeks in Walter Reed Army Hospital.

In April 1945, Althaus was transferred to the Armored School and Armored Replacement Training Center at Fort Knox, Kentucky where he became Commanding General of the School Troops under Major general Charles L. Scott. During the July that year, Althaus was ordered to the Camp Hood, Texas where he replaced Brigadier general Miles A. Cowles as Commandant of the Tank Destroyer School. Althaus held this assignment until March 31, 1946 when he retired from active duty after 30 years of service.

== Later life ==
Following his retirement from the Army, Althaus and his family moved to Florida where he served as a Superintendent of Silver Springs grounds between 1951-1961. He then retired to Ocala, Florida where he became an oil painter and was active in the Episcopal Church.

Brigadier general Kenneth G. Althaus died on June 8, 1987, aged 91, at his home in Ocala and was buried at Grace Episcopal Memorial Gardens together with his wife, Virginia Frances Herty Althaus (1898-1995). They had one son, Kenneth G. Althaus Jr. (1922-2006) who also served in the U.S. Army and retired as Colonel.

== Decorations ==
Here is the ribbon bar of Brigadier general Althaus:

1st Row	Bronze Star Medal	World War I Victory Medal with four battle clasps	Army of Occupation of Germany Medal
2nd Row	American Defense Service Medal	American Campaign Medal	European-African-Middle Eastern Campaign Medal with two 3/16 inch service stars
3rd Row	World War II Victory Medal	Belgian Croix de Guerre	French Croix de Guerre 1914-1918 with Palm
