= Gun stabilizer =

Compensates for the motion of the platform

A gun stabilizer is a device that facilitates aiming an artillery piece by compensating for the motion of the platform on which it is mounted. For naval applications see ship gun fire-control system. Moving land-based systems tend to require more specialized stabilization. Due to the need to fire while in motion, tanks in World War II made some use of stabilization, but it became commonplace in later decades during the Cold War.

== History ==
The gunner of the early Matilda II tank elevated and depressed the gun by hand, and had a shoulder pad by which he could support it steadily as the tank moved while he stood.

The primary armament of most US tanks was stabilized in elevation starting with the M3A1 Light Tank and the M3 Medium tank in November 1941. Except for the 105mm-equipped M4 Sherman tanks, all U.S.-built tanks had a stabilization system for gun elevation usable at low speeds. Some attempt was made to stabilize Soviet tank guns as early as 1938.

U.S. tanks equipped with the single plane gun elevation stabilization were found to be more effective at engaging targets while moving at up to 10 mph using the stabilization system. However, its use in the war was limited as the British did not use it in their US Lend-Lease vehicles, and American forces lost their proficiency as less-trained crewmen replaced the crews that had trained on their vehicles for years in the US before deployment. The crews did not know how to use stabilization; also, most U.S. tanks fired while stationary. Lack of maintenance also reduced its use. In some units the crews swore by it; in others, they removed the system.

Post-war, British and then Soviet tank designers developed improved gun stabilizers. In 1948, the British Centurion Mk. 3 featured the first two-plane stabilization system in a production tank, while 1954 saw the introduction of the STP-1 stabilizer complex for the T-54A, and similar systems would be implemented on virtually all Soviet tanks from then on. The US would not utilize gun stabilization in any of their Medium and Main Battle Tanks until the Add-On Stabilization (AOS) upgrade package developed for the M60A1 in the early 1970s, though the M551 Sheridan light tank, introduced in 1967, was equipped with a gun stabilizer.

In 1960, West Germany prototyped a unique proof-of-concept three-axis stabilized turret on a widened Leopard 1 chassis. The primary cannon remained stationary, while the turret rotated conventionally for horizontal aiming and employed oscillation for vertical alignment. Additionally, the turret could tilt left or right along a third axis to accommodate aiming corrections on uneven terrain. All turret movements were exclusively powered, lacking manual controls. Design was cost ineffective and was ultimately not adopted, but lessons learned were carried over to other FCS research.

== Operation ==
There are many forms of gun stabilization. The simple single-plane stabilizer only stabilizes on a vertical axis, and the two-plane stabilizer stabilizes both the vertical and horizontal axis.

The mechanism usually includes an angular reference device such as a mechanical or optical gyroscope and servomechanisms. In the case of a tank, one servo stabilizes the turret and another the elevation of the gun. This was experimented with in late 1944–1945, continuing after the war. In WWII only gun elevation was stabilized using a gyro. The input was directly to the gun. The aiming is then done by control input to the mechanism, rather than directly on the gun. The control mechanism usually has other functions, such as applying super-elevation and leading the target according to its velocity, making it a fire-control system, and some guns are entirely automatic.

Stabilization was added for the turret, keeping the turret pointed in the direction the gunner placed it regardless of the direction of the hull. With both the gun and turret stabilized the gun would remain pointed where the gun sight was pointed regardless of the movement of the tank unless the elevation or depression limits were exceeded. This was a mechanical, then electrical system inputting to mechanical, then electrical or hydraulic motor systems controlling the gun movement based on the input from one gyro system, for the gun, or two, also for the turret. This type of system with an ability to almost equal the accuracy of firing the gun from a full halt was introduced into the U.S. M60A1 tank in the early 1970s. An alternative system was also developed where instead of stabilizing the gun the gun sights were stabilized and the gun fired when its aim matched the gun sight's position. This allowed the gun to elevate or depress free from the gun sight allowing the use of auto-loaders where the gun moves to be loaded, then back to match where the gunsight points.

Gun stabilization in both elevation and traverse added to other improvements. These included range finding through stereoscopic, then coincidence visual range finders, then laser range finders, which were introduced in the late 1970s. An analog and later digital computer was added which had the range input. Also input was the rate the turret rotated. The computer took the range input to use the rate of the turret rotation to determine the lead needed to hit a moving target by calculating its speed. Added to this was the barrel wear determined by the number of and types of ammunition fired, the temperature of the ammunition propellant measured by thermometers in the ammunition compartment, the wind direction and speed where the firing tank was located measured by sensors on the turret roof, and barrel droop by measuring the location of a barrel mounted reference system near the muzzle. Barrel droop was also limited by insulating the barrel so it expands and contracts evenly along its length. This enables the modern tank using the current stabilization systems to hit a target moving thirty miles an hour while itself is moving at the same speed at ranges of 2000 meters or more, as accurately as if standing still.

== See also ==
- Fire-control system
- Ship gun fire-control system
