= 759th Tank Battalion (United States) =

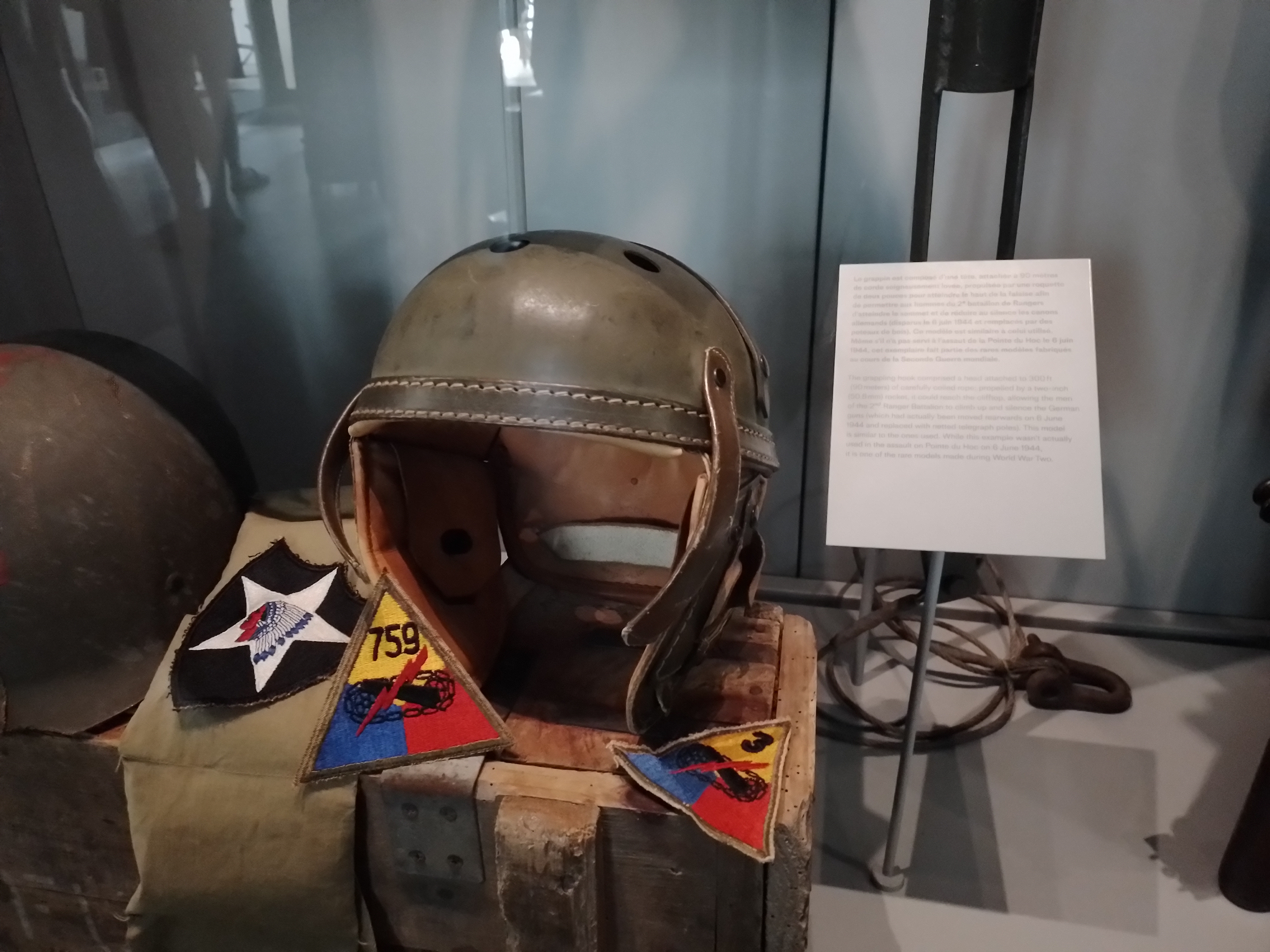
- Tankist helmet and badge of the 759th Tank Battalion (center).
- Active: 1941–45
- Disbanded: 1945
- Country: United States
- Branch: Army
- Part of: Independent unit
- Equipment: M3 Stuart; M24 Chaffee

The 759th Tank Battalion was an independent tank battalion of the United States Army active during the Second World War.

It was activated under the command of lieutenant colonel Kenneth G. Althaus in June 1941 as a light tank battalion, equipped with M3 Stuart tanks, and sent to Iceland as part of the garrison force in mid-1942. After a year it moved to the United Kingdom, in mid-1943, and was landed in Normandy on D+10, 16 June 1944. It was attached to the 2nd Infantry Division and fought in the St-Lo area. When the 2nd Division moved westwards towards Brest in mid-August, the battalion was attached to the 4th Cavalry Group, with which it would serve for the remainder of the war.

Moving eastwards, it crossed the Seine north of Paris in late August with VII Corps, then over the Meuse, entering Germany on 13 September. In December, it moved north into the Ardennes during the Battle of the Bulge, and was the first unit to receive the M24 Chaffee tank. It then took up defensive positions, before reaching the Rhine in early March. It moved through Germany capturing a number of small towns in April, and ended the war in Aschersleben, eastern Germany, where it began occupation duties.

== Limitations of the M3/M5 light tank ==
Major Loyal Fairall, who commanded the battalion in August/September 1944, wrote of the limitations of the Stuart light tank:

...(it) is apparent that a Light Tank Battalion, armed with only 37mm guns, unless very skillfully employed with Infantry, will suffer severe casualties in men and material. The Light Tank still has to depend on speed, maneuver, and selection of suitable targets if it is to be of very much use. In spite of the fact that the training of this Battalion was not pointed toward reconnaissance lines, we have been able to accomplish our missions with a Cavalry Reconnaissance Group with a much greater degree of success than in any other assignment to date.
