= Royal Italian Army during World War II =

Principal ground forces of the Kingdom of Italy during World War II

Royal Italian Army
- Regio Esercito
- The War and Army Flag of the Kingdom of Italy, bearing the emblem of House of Savoy.
- Active: 1940–1945
- Country: Kingdom of Italy
- Allegiance: King of Italy
- Size: 2,560,000 (1940–1943)
- Anniversaries: November 4
- Engagements: World War II

Commanders
- King of Italy: Victor Emmanuel III
- Commander-in-chief (1940–1943): Benito Mussolini
- Army Chief of Staff: Rodolfo Graziani (first); Ercole Ronco (last)
- Chief of the General Staff: Pietro Badoglio Ugo Cavallero Vittorio Ambrosio Giovanni Messe Claudio Trezzani

The Royal Italian Army (Italian: Regio Esercito) was the land forces of the Kingdom of Italy during World War II. It was active from 1940 until the end of the war in 1945. During the war, a total about 2.56 million conscripts and volunteers served in the Royal Italian Army.

In the aftermath of the Armistice of Cassibile in September 1943, the Royal Italian Army became the Italian Co-belligerent Army fighting alongside the Allies, while the National Republican Army was created by the Italian Social Republic to fight alongside the Axis.

== Organization ==
The Italian Army of World War II was a "Royal" army. The nominal Commander-in-Chief of the Italian Royal Army was His Majesty King Vittorio Emanuele III. As Commander-in-Chief of all Italian armed forces, Vittorio Emanuele also commanded the Royal Air Force (Regia Aeronautica) and the Royal Navy (Regia Marina). However, in reality, most of the King's military responsibilities were assumed by the Italian Prime Minister Benito Mussolini.

Below Mussolini was the Supreme Command (Comando Supremo). The Supreme Command featured an organic staff which functioned through its defense ministries and through its various high commands. The defense ministries were based on function and included a Ministry of War, a Ministry of the Admiralty, and a Ministry of the Air. The high commands were based on geographic regions and included Army Group West, Army Group Albania, Army Group East Africa, Army Group Aegean, and Army Group Libya.

Below the Army Group were armies. Armies were typically composed of two or more corps, along with separate units directly commanded at the army level. The corps were then typically composed of two or more divisions, along with separate units directly commanded at the corps level.

The division was the basic formation of the Italian Royal Army. On 10 June 1940, the army had 59 infantry divisions, three Blackshirts (Voluntary Militia for National Security – Milizia Volontaria per la Sicurezza Nazionale, MVSN) divisions, five high mountain (alpini) divisions, three mobile (celere) divisions, two motorized divisions, and three armored divisions. In addition, there were estimated to be the equivalent of about nine divisions of frontier guard troops. There were also numerous colonial formations at or near the division level composed of troops from Italian Libya and Italian East Africa.

Impressive on paper, most Italian divisions did not have the full complement of men or materials when war was declared in 1940. The armored divisions had lightly armed "tankettes" instead of tanks.

=== Binary infantry division ===
After a reorganization in 1938, Italian infantry divisions were known as "binary" divisions (divisione binaria). This is because Italian infantry divisions were based on two regiments instead of the three that prevailed prior to the reorganization. By comparison, German divisions had three infantry regiments. In addition to the two infantry regiments, the Italian infantry division included an artillery regiment, a mortar battalion, an engineer battalion, and a pack gun company. The division also had some division-level services and could have a division-level reserve infantry battalion.

The typical infantry regiment was composed of three rifle battalions. However, some regiments had as many as five battalions. By design, each regiment had 24 heavy machine guns, 108 light machine guns, six 81 mm mortars (Mortaio da 81/14 Modello 35), fifty-four 45 mm mortars (Brixia Model 35), and four 65 mm infantry guns (Cannone da 65/17).

The divisional artillery regiment typically had 36 field pieces by design. There was a horsedrawn battery of 12 100 mm howitzers, a horsedrawn battery of twelve 75 mm guns, and a pack horse-mounted battery of 12 75 mm howitzers. In addition to the field pieces, there was a mechanized troop of eight 20 mm anti-aircraft guns. Much Italian artillery was obsolete and far too reliant on horse transport.

The mortar battalion typically had 18 81 mm mortars and the pack gun company had 8 47 mm anti-tank guns.

From 1 March 1940, an MVSN Legion of two battalions was attached to most infantry divisions. This was to increase the manpower available to each division and also to include Fascist troops. The arrival of the Blackshirt Legions effectively restored the triangular form of the divisions they reinforced.

=== Alpine division ===
The personnel, named Alpini, were drawn from Italy's mountainous regions for the army's alpine divisions and tended to be of superior quality. In addition to being well trained for mountain warfare, they were expert in the handling of pack artillery. The alpine divisions differed from a standard infantry division in that each regiment had its own artillery, engineering, and ancillary services associated with the regiment on a permanent basis. This made each regiment of an alpine division relatively self-supporting and capable of independent action. By design, an alpine division consisted of a divisional headquarters, two Alpini regiments, a mountain artillery regiment, a mixed engineer battalion, a chemical warfare company, two reserve Alpini battalions, and divisional services. The divisional headquarters included an anti-tank platoon. Each Alpini regiment included a headquarters company, with a platoon of flamethrowers. Each regiment also included three Alpini battalions and the service support units assigned. At full strength, the firepower for an Alpini regiment was 27 heavy machine guns, 81 light machine guns, 27 45 mm mortars, 12 81 mm mortars, and 27 flamethrowers. The mountain artillery regiment was split between the two infantry regiments. Each regiment was provided with a battalion of 75 mm howitzers, which were transported on pack animals.

=== Armoured division ===
At the beginning of the war, the armoured divisions were filled with L3 tankettes and, as a result, were incapable of providing the armoured spearhead that the German tank (panzer) formations could. Initially, a total of about 100 "medium" M11 tanks were available. But, while these vehicles were an improvement over the L3s, they were still more like "light" tanks. In addition, they were poorly designed (main armament in a "fixed" position), far too few, too under-gunned, too thinly armoured, too slow, and too unreliable to make a difference.

By design, an armoured division included one tank regiment, one artillery regiment, one highly-mobile infantry (Bersaglieri) regiment, a divisional support and a mixed engineer company. The tank regiment could have between three and five tank battalions. At full strength, each battalion had 55 tanks.

Once sufficient numbers of the M13/40 tanks and its upgrades were available, Italian armored divisions began to possess some offensive capability. The Italians also developed several self-propelled 75 mm guns on the M13 chassis when the evolution in tank artillery made the 47 mm gun obsolete. Like the German 88 mm gun, the Italians learned that a 75 mm anti-aircraft gun (Cannone da 75/46 C.A. modello 34) or a 90 mm anti-aircraft gun (Cannone da 90/53) made effective anti-tank guns. While always in short supply, 57 of the 90 mm guns were ordered to be mounted on heavy trucks (Autocannoni da 90/53) to enhance mobility. 30 guns were mounted on an M14/41 tank chassis as Tank Destroyer 90/53 (Semovente 90/53).

=== Libyan divisions ===
In 1940, Italy had two divisions in Italian North Africa composed of troops native to Libya commanded by Italian officers. In many ways the Libyan divisions followed the make-up of a standard binary infantry division. Each Libyan division had two colonial infantry regiments. Each infantry regiment had three infantry battalion and a Guns company (4 65/17 mm I-Guns ). The Libyan divisions also had an integral colonial artillery regiment and colonial engineering battalion. A typical Libyan division fielded 7,400 men (including 900 Italians). The artillery regiment by design included 24 77 mm guns. The "Maletti Group" (Raggruppamento Maletti) was an ad hoc unit composed of Libyan troops transported in trucks and was commanded by the unit's namesake, General Pietro Maletti. This partly motorized unit took part in the Italian invasion of Egypt in September 1940 and in the defense of the Nibeiwa Camp in December 1940 during Operation Compass. In addition to 2,500 Libyan troops in 6 battalions, the Maletti Group included a colonial artillery element and 2 coy of armor: 12 M11 medium tanks and 14 L3 tankettes.

=== "North Africa" division ===
During 1942, attempts were made to increase both the firepower and the mechanization available at the divisional level. As a result, a new "North Africa 1942" (Africa settentrionale 1942, or A.S.42) type division was developed. Similar to a standard infantry division, an "A.S.42" type division still had two infantry regiments, an artillery regiment, a mixed engineer battalion, a medical section, and a supply section. But the infantry regiments could vary greatly because the basic units making up the regiment were now an expandable company. The artillery regiment sometimes included a battery of German 88 mm guns. Mobility was increased and, in theory, an "A.S.42" type division was mechanized to a higher degree than standard infantry divisions. Unfortunately, in practice, few units had the full complement of motor vehicles.

Italian motor vehicles, while in short supply, tended to be of better than average quality. British Field Marshal Bernard Montgomery made use of a captured Italian vehicle.

=== Motorised division ===
The motorized divisions were similar to the "North Africa" type division, but they included a regiment of highly-mobile elite riflemen (Bersaglieri). The Bersaglieri appear to have actually received the motorcycles and trucks they were allocated.

=== Motor-transportable division ===
From the beginning of the war, some infantry divisions were theoretically fully mechanized and were designated as motor-transportable divisions. Again, in practice, few units had the full complement of motor vehicles. Other than being transported by motor vehicle, these divisions were organized like a standard infantry division, with two exceptions. Motor-transportable divisions had a larger complement of mortars and they did not have a MVSN Legion.

In 1942, the motor-transportable divisions in North Africa were upgraded to become "North African" type motorised divisions. In spite of the upgrade, these divisions were still not fully motorized. The divisions tended to rely primarily on non-divisional sources for transportation and were, therefore, only part-time motor-transportable.

=== Cavalry division ===
Mobile (celere) divisions were cavalry divisions that had undergone a level of mechanization. Each division had two cavalry regiments, a highly-mobile infantry (Bersaglieri) regiment, an artillery regiment, and a light tank group. The squadrons of the cavalry regiments were horse-mounted and, other than a motorcycle company, the Bersaglieri were issued with bicycles. The light tank group had a total of 61 tanks. The tanks were typically L3s or L6s.

== Main armaments ==
During the first years of World War II, Italy had only small light and medium tanks (L3/35, L6/40, M11/39, M13/40 and M15/42) tanks. When Italy declared war in 1940, Italy's armored divisions were still composed of hundreds of L3 tankettes. These vehicles were hardly on par with the Allied tanks available in 1939 and were seriously out-classed by 1942. Better Italian tanks were produced but they were generally only available in limited numbers. Italian tanks typically suffered from poor main armaments and thin, bolted-on armour.

It was not until summer 1943 that the Italians developed a heavier tank (the P40). However, while the P40 was in the same class as the contemporary M4 Sherman, only five were ready for combat before Italy signed the armistice that same year. The Germans acquired and used the few P40s which were produced.

To supplement the deficiencies of the main armaments on most tanks, the Italian Army made use of self-propelled guns like the Semovente 75/18 and the Semovente 75/34. The Italians also fielded some reliable armoured cars like the AB 41.

While Semovente 75/18s were available in some numbers in North Africa, the more potent Semovente 75/34s, Semovente da 75/46s, Semovente 90/53s, Semovente 105/25s, and Semovente 149/40s were available in limited numbers or not at all prior to the armistice. Like the P40, the Germans acquired the few better-quality self-propelled guns manufactured prior to the armistice and even continued to manufacture some after the armistice.

The main infantry weapons were Carcano rifles, Beretta M1934 and M1935 pistols, Bodeo M1889 revolvers, Breda 30 light machine guns, Breda M37 and Fiat–Revelli Modello 1935 heavy machine guns, and Beretta Model 38 submachine guns. Second line units frequently made use of captured equipment such as Lebel Model 1886 rifles and, for colonial troops, Schwarzlose MG M.07/12s and Steyr-Mannlicher M1895 rifles, provided by Austria as war reparations after World War I.

== History ==
=== History before World War II ===
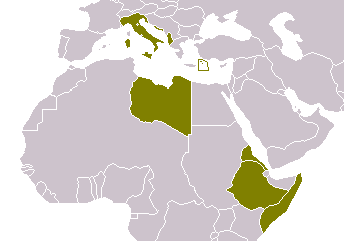
The Italian empire in 1940. In addition to mainland Italy, Albania, ASI, and AOI are shown in green. The Dodecanese islands are boxed in green.

Mussolini's Under-Secretary for War Production, Carlo Favagrossa, had estimated that Italy could not possibly be prepared for a war until at least October 1942. Although Fascist Italy was considered a major power, Italian industry was relatively weak compared to other major powers in Europe. In 1940, Italian industry probably was no more than 15% of that of France or of the United Kingdom. The lack of a stronger automotive industry made it difficult for Italy to mechanize its military.

In the new Italian Empire, Italy had used most of the economic and military resources available during the Second Italo-Abyssinian War the conquest of Ethiopia, from 1935 to 1936, during the Spanish Civil War from 1936 to 1939, and during the Italian invasion of Albania in 1939. In the early 1930s, the Italian Royal Army successfully fought an Arab guerrilla war in Italian North Africa (Africa Settentrionale Italiana, or ASI). The Italians fought another guerilla war in Italian East Africa (Africa Orientale Italiana, or AOI) between 1936 and 1940. The Italian Royal Army remained comparatively weak in armaments. The Italian tanks were of poor quality. Italian radios were small in numbers. Much of the Italian artillery and weapons dated from the First World War. Most important of all, the Italian generals were trained in the trench warfare of World War I and were not prepared at all for the new style of mechanized war based on the German "lightning war" model (blitzkrieg).

From 1936 to 1939, Italy participated on the side of Spanish General Francisco Franco during the Spanish Civil War. The 50,000 to 75,000 strong "Corps of Volunteer Troops" (Corpo Truppe Volontarie, CVT) was of significant assistance to the Spanish Nationalist cause and was involved in the Aragon Offensive and the "March to the Sea." Unfortunately for the Italian Royal Army, a large number of Italian weapons and supplies were utilized by the CVT or provided to Spanish Nationalists forces during this conflict.

In 1939, Italy conquered Albania without difficulty and forced King Zog to flee. As would be expected, Italy suffered few casualties. But this occupation stretched to the limit the resources of the Italian Royal Army. In spring 1940, the available oil resources for possible military operations (of the Army and Navy) were for only one year.

=== History during World War II ===
Unlike the German Führer, Adolf Hitler, Mussolini was officially only the Prime Minister of the Kingdom of Italy. Victor Emmanuel III remained Head of State and Commander-in-Chief of the Italian Royal Armed Forces, until 11 June 1940 when the King delegated the power to Mussolini naming him as the "Supreme Commander of the Armed Forces Operating on all Fronts". Mussolini needed the consent of the King (who always looked on France as the center of European politics) to declare war and enter the Second World War. Initially the King and his staff (conscious of the Italian lack of preparation for war) did not approve Mussolini's intentions, but when France was clearly defeated in June 1940, the Italian Royal Army (Regio Esercito) was abruptly sent to war. Mussolini made the mistake to believe that Britain would accept peace agreements with the Axis after France's surrender, and did not anticipate a long lasting war. Consequently, Italy entered the war inadequately prepared.

==== Initial campaigns ====
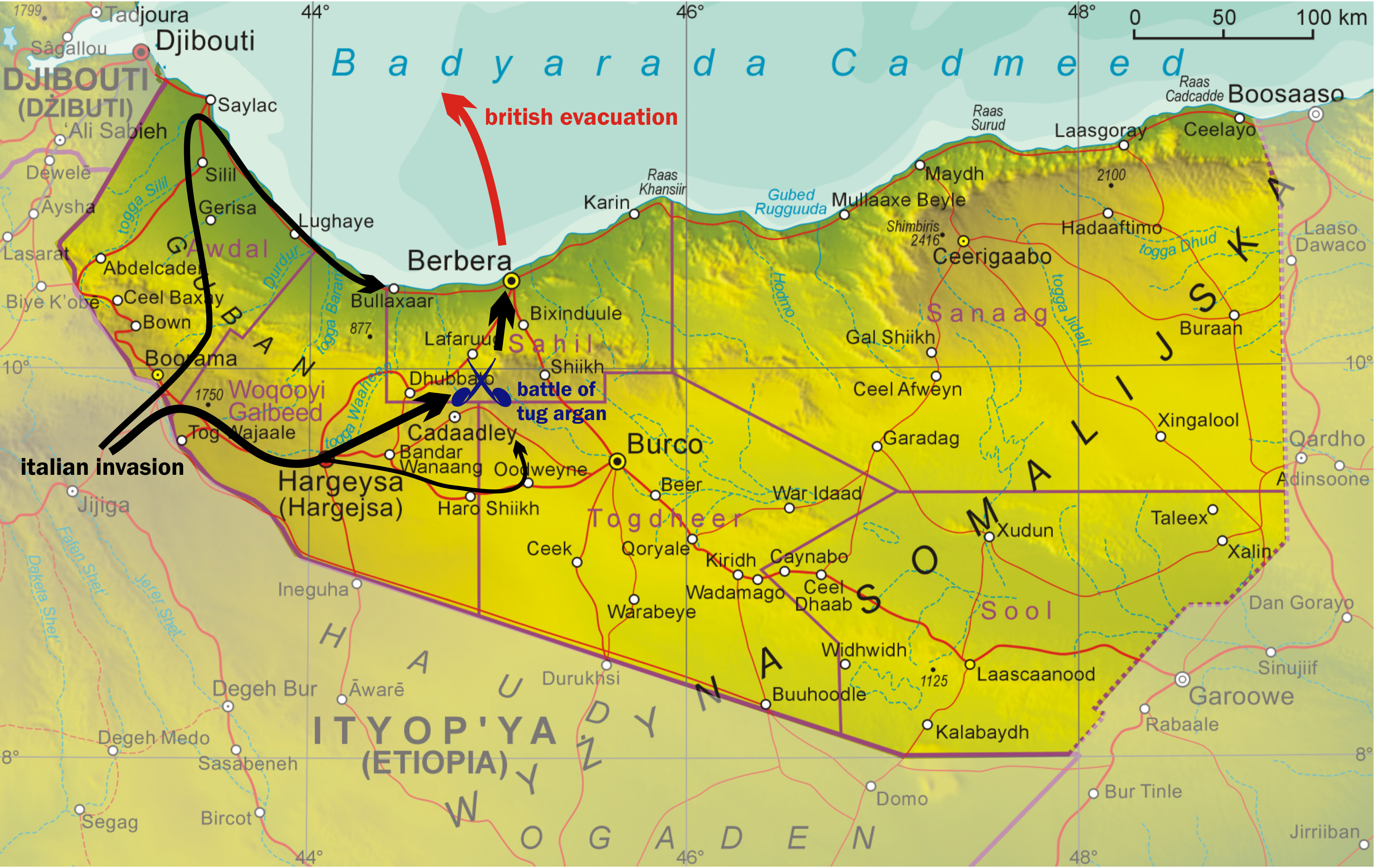
The Italian conquest of British Somaliland in August 1940

Italy declared war on 10 June 1940 and began the Italian invasion of France against the French army. But the French were not quickly defeated on this front and all advances came at a high cost to the Italian army. Only in July, after the French surrender to Germany, did the Royal Army initiate a limited campaign from Italian colonies in Africa (Libya and Italian East Africa) against British possessions in Africa (Egypt, Kenya and Sudan). Italian forces invaded Egypt. In August, the Italian Royal Army obtained Italy's only major victory in World War II without German assistance when it conquered British Somaliland. In the first six months of war Italy obtained only minor territorial gains, as Mussolini mistakenly waited for a quick end of the war.

In December 1940, British Commonwealth forces initiated Operation Compass which, by February 1941, had occupied Cyrenaica and destroyed the Italian 10th Army. In January 1941, other British Commonwealth forces launched an invasion of Italian East Africa. By November of that year, at the conclusion of the East African campaign, the last organized Italian troops surrendered with military honors in Gondar while some Italian officers started a guerrilla war, mainly in Ethiopia and Eritrea.

In Europe, Mussolini wanted to imitate the rapid German victories of 1939 to 1940. Mussolini began the Greco-Italian War by invading Greece from Albania in October 1940. The advances of the Royal Army were blocked by the Greek Army and bad weather. Soon Greek counter-attacks forced the Italians onto the defensive inside Albania. In March 1941, prior to the Axis invasion of Yugoslavia, the Italian Royal Army launched an offensive against the Greeks which ended in failure, despite meaningful gains and at high costs. A few weeks later the Axis forces of Germany, Italy and Hungary defeated the Yugoslavian army in few days, and German and Italian forces defeated Greece. The Axis victory was swift: on April 17, 1941, Yugoslavia surrendered after only eleven days, while Greece was fully occupied in May and was placed under the triple occupation of Italy, Germany and Bulgaria.

==== German and Italian cooperation ====
After these setbacks, Mussolini accepted assistance from Hitler and the Royal Army was reinforced (and in some cases even trained to modern military tactics and organizations) by the powerful German Army. The Royal Army even started to receive better and more modern armaments from the Italian industry, after the pressures from Mussolini to activate to the maximum the Italian "war machine".

The result was a combined German and Italian offensive during the spring and summer of 1941 throughout the entire Mediterranean area:

- In the Balkans, the Italian Royal Army conquered coastal Yugoslavia and, together with the Germans, finally defeated the remaining Greek forces in the region. On 3 May 1941, the Italian and German militaries held a military parade in Athens to celebrate their victory in the Balkans. In this parade, Mussolini for the first time boasted of an Italian Mare Nostrum, referring to the fact that the Mediterranean was becoming an Italian-dominated sea. Effectively, it remained practically Italian from December 1941 after the raid on Alexandria by Italian frogmen under the command of Luigi Durand De La Penne (which disabled two Royal Navy battleships), until the landings of Allied forces in French Algeria in November 1942.
- In North Africa, the Italian Royal Army was joined by German General Erwin Rommel and his Afrika Korps. A combined German and Italian force started a series of offensives and counter-offensives that culminated with the Axis victory of Gazala and Tobruk. By 1942, the Germans and Italians were driving towards Alexandria in Egypt.

Mussolini sent an Italian army against the Soviet Union. In July 1941, the "Italian Expeditionary Corps in Russia" (Corpo di Spedizione Italiano in Russia, or CSIR) arrived and assisted with the German conquest of Ukraine. By 1942, Italian forces in the Soviet Union were more than doubled to become the "Italian Army in Russia" (Armata Italiana in Russia, or ARMIR). This army, also known as the Italian 8th Army, was deployed in the outskirts of Stalingrad where it was destroyed during the Battle of Stalingrad.

In November 1942, with the arrival of the American Army in the Maghreb, the Italian Royal Army occupied Corsica and the French Provence up to the Rhone river. This was the last military expansion of Italy.

==== Defeat ====
The Battle of El Alamein, lasting from July to November 1942, was the turning point of the war for the Italians and the Allies. Many Italians were killed, wounded or taken prisoner in the battle after heavy resistance. Winston Churchill wrote in his Memories: "...before El Alamein we had only defeats, after El Alamein we had only victories...". The Italian Royal Army fought this battle in a way that can be summarized by the sacrifice of the Division Folgore: the historian Renzo De Felice wrote that "...of the 5.000 "Folgore" paratroopers sent to Africa 4 months before, the survived were only 32 officers and 262 soldiers, most of them wounded. Before the surrender, they shot until the last ammo and the last hand-grenade...". After the defeat at El Alamein, the Royal Army lost Libya in a few months. Tunisia was occupied together with the German forces in November 1942 but was lost in May 1943. In July 1943 Sicily was invaded by the Allies and on 8 September 1943, Italy signed the Armistice with the Allies.

=== Army of the Badoglio government ===
Because of the chaotic way the Armistice was done, the Italian Royal Army (Regio Esercito) suffered a terrible crisis of leadership between September and October 1943. The German occupation of Italy and of Italian positions in the Balkans and elsewhere was swift and often violent. There were 73,277 casualties in those months. With King Victor Emmanuel III and Marshal Pietro Badoglio in command, the Royal Army entered the war on the side of the Allies. Fighting for what became known as the "Badoglio government," the Italian Co-Belligerent Army, the Italian Co-Belligerent Air Force, and the Italian Co-Belligerent Navy were formed. Mussolini organized a new Fascist army in his "Italian Social Republic" (Repubblica Sociale Italiana, or RSI) in northern Italy. This army was called the National Republican Army (Esercito Nazionale Repubblicano, or ENR). While it lasted until April 1945, the RSI never amounted to being more than a puppet state of Nazi Germany.

== Conscription and recruitment ==
All male Italian citizens between the ages of 18 and 54 were liable for military service. During World War II, 18-year-olds were conscripted without any preliminary military training. Conscription was lax, as those who were more well off generally avoided military service, and that service largely fell on the peasantry, which made up nearly half of the country's population by 1940. The peasantry were poor, mostly illiterate or semi-literate, traditional and had a distrust of authority; because of this officers looked down upon their soldiers. Many Italian soldiers were poorly trained and would often surrender when being strongly under attack. Those living in the Dodecanese Islands were exempt from military service and had been so since 1925.

Previously in times of peace, those between the ages of 18 and 54 served in several stages. The first consisted of pre-military training which began at 18 and lasted until "the completion of the trainee's 20th year"; which was followed by being a conscript for 18 months after they turned 21. When finishing their conscript service they did another round of training lasting until they were 33 which was lastly followed by being placed in active reserve status until they were 54.

Soldiers were recruited from their colonial empire as well such as in Ethiopia. For an Italian soldier to serve in the North African campaign they needed to "...meet only basic requirements such as their teeth being in order or being in reasonable health".

== Casualties ==
Nearly four million Italians served in the Italian Royal Army during the Second World War. Nearly half a million Italians (including civilians) died between June 1940 and May 1945. The Royal Army suffered 161,729 casualties between 10 June 1940 and 8 September 1943 in the war against the Allies. There were an additional 18,655 Italian casualties in Italy (plus 54,622 Italian casualties in the rest of Europe) between September and October 1943. These casualties were suffered against the German Army (Wehrmacht) after the Italian Armistice. There were about 12,000 casualties in the northern Italian guerrilla war (Guerra di Liberazione) and in the Italian Royal Army on the side of the Allies. Nearly 60,000 Italian POWs died in Nazi labour camps, while nearly 20,000 perished in Allied Prisoner of War camps (mainly Russian: 1/4 of the 84,830 Italians officially lost in the Soviet Union were taken prisoners, and most of them never returned home).

== Ranks of the Royal Army during the Second World War ==
The Royal Army had its own set of ranks for all active service personnel.

=== Officers ===
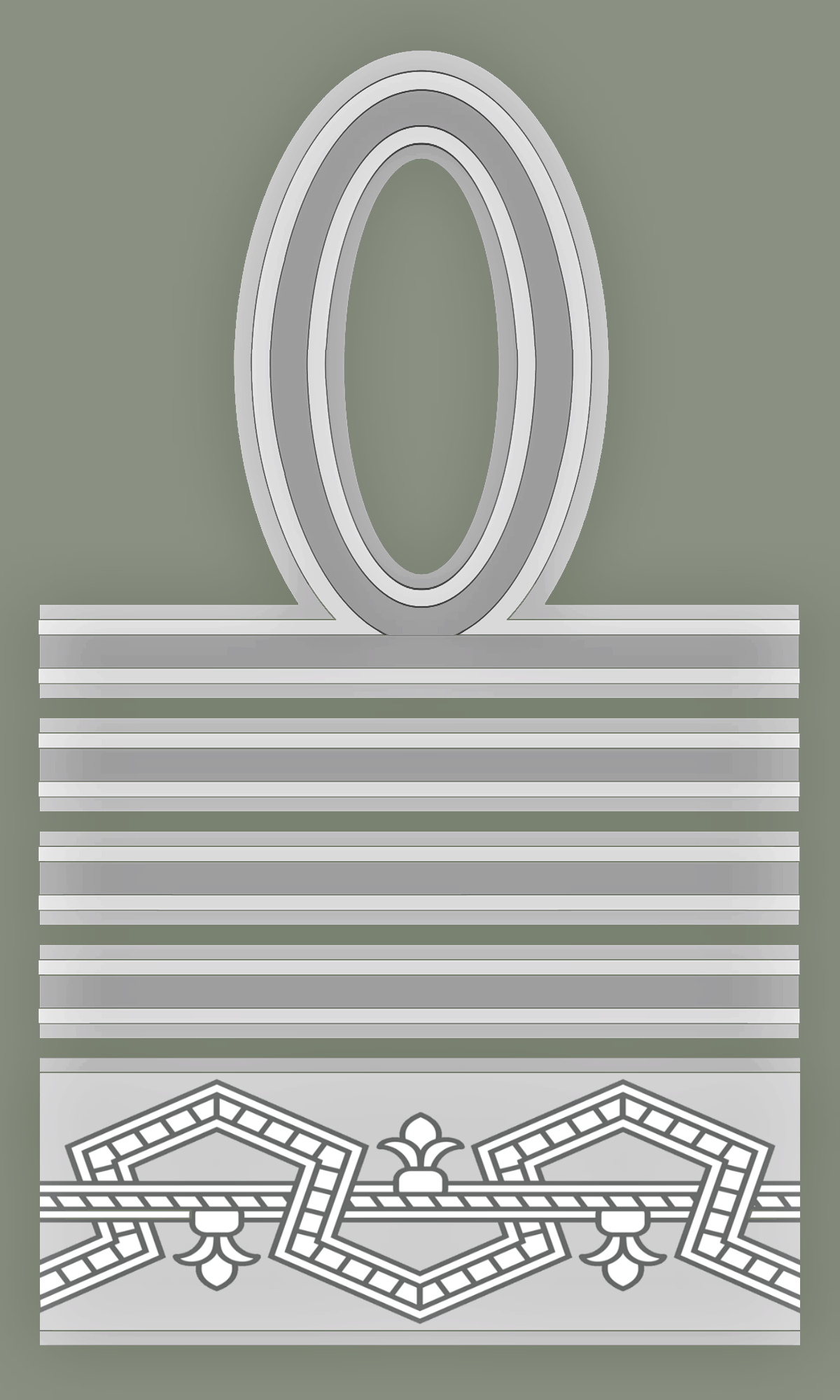
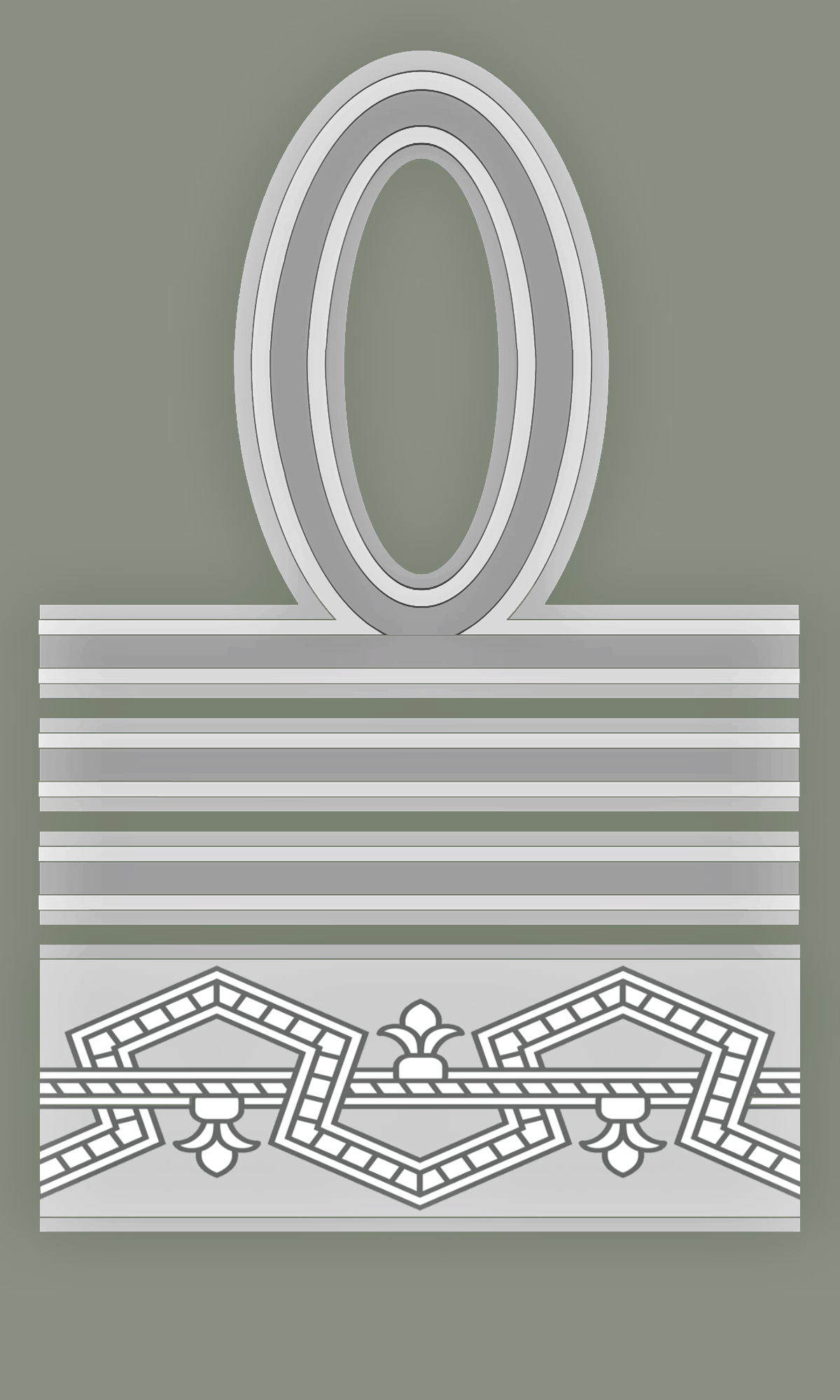
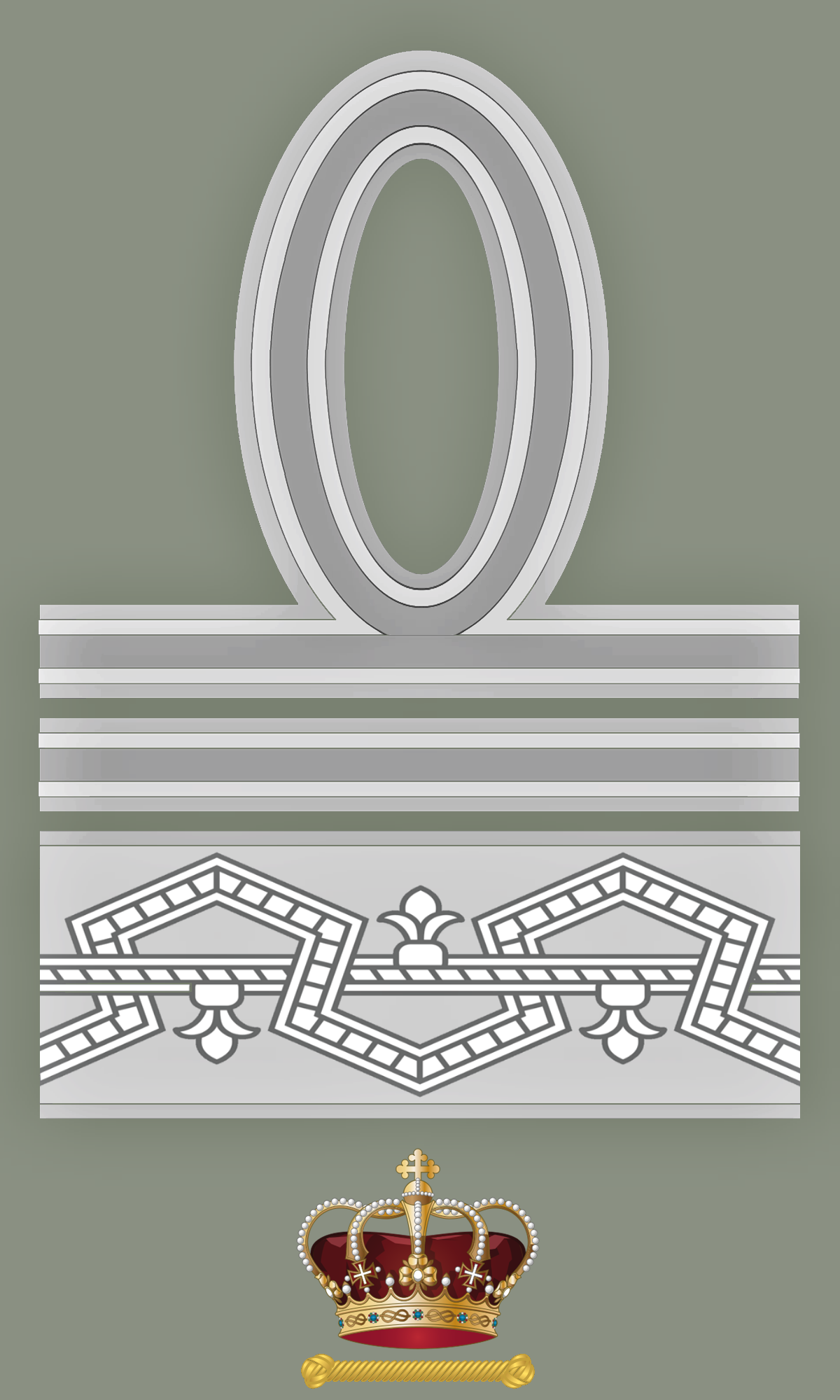
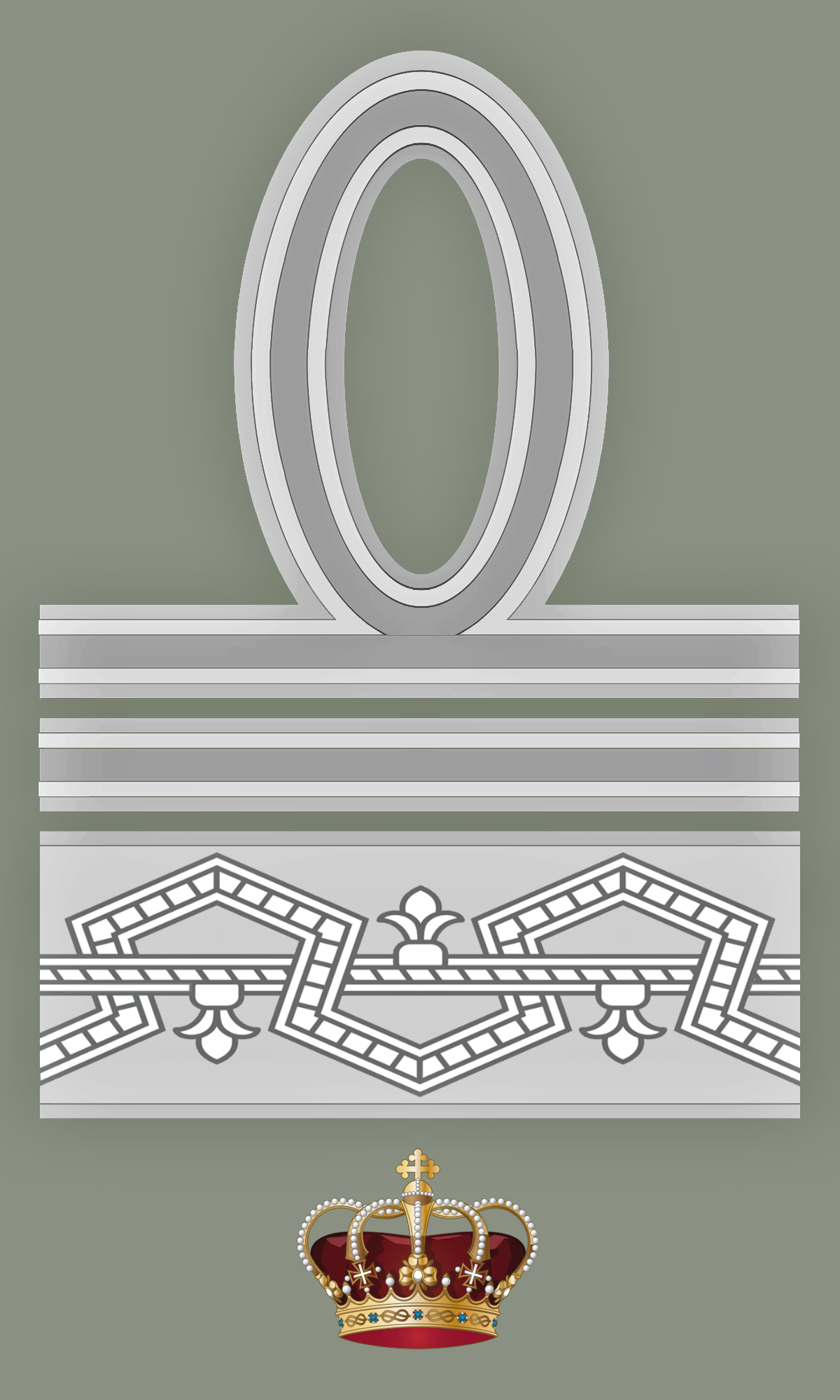
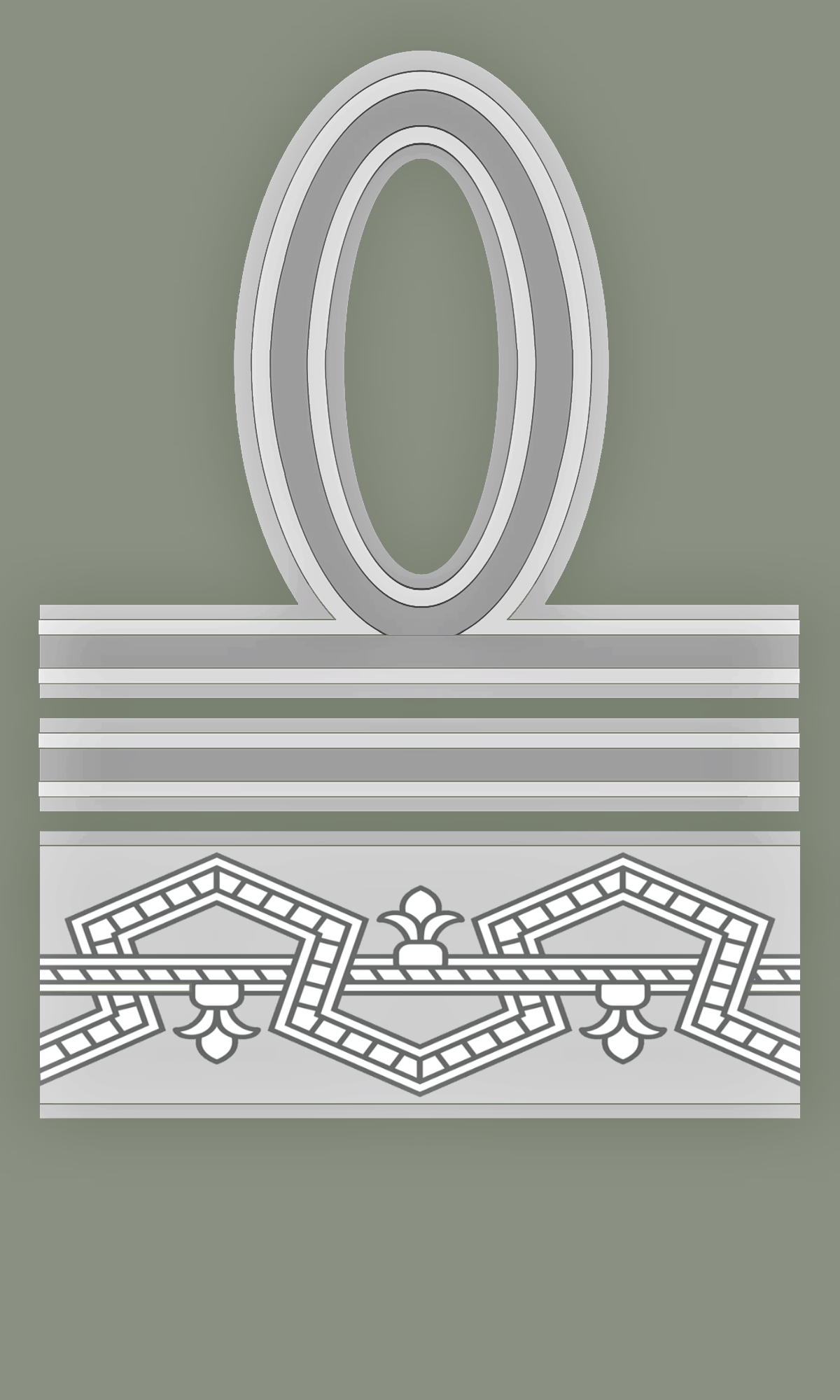
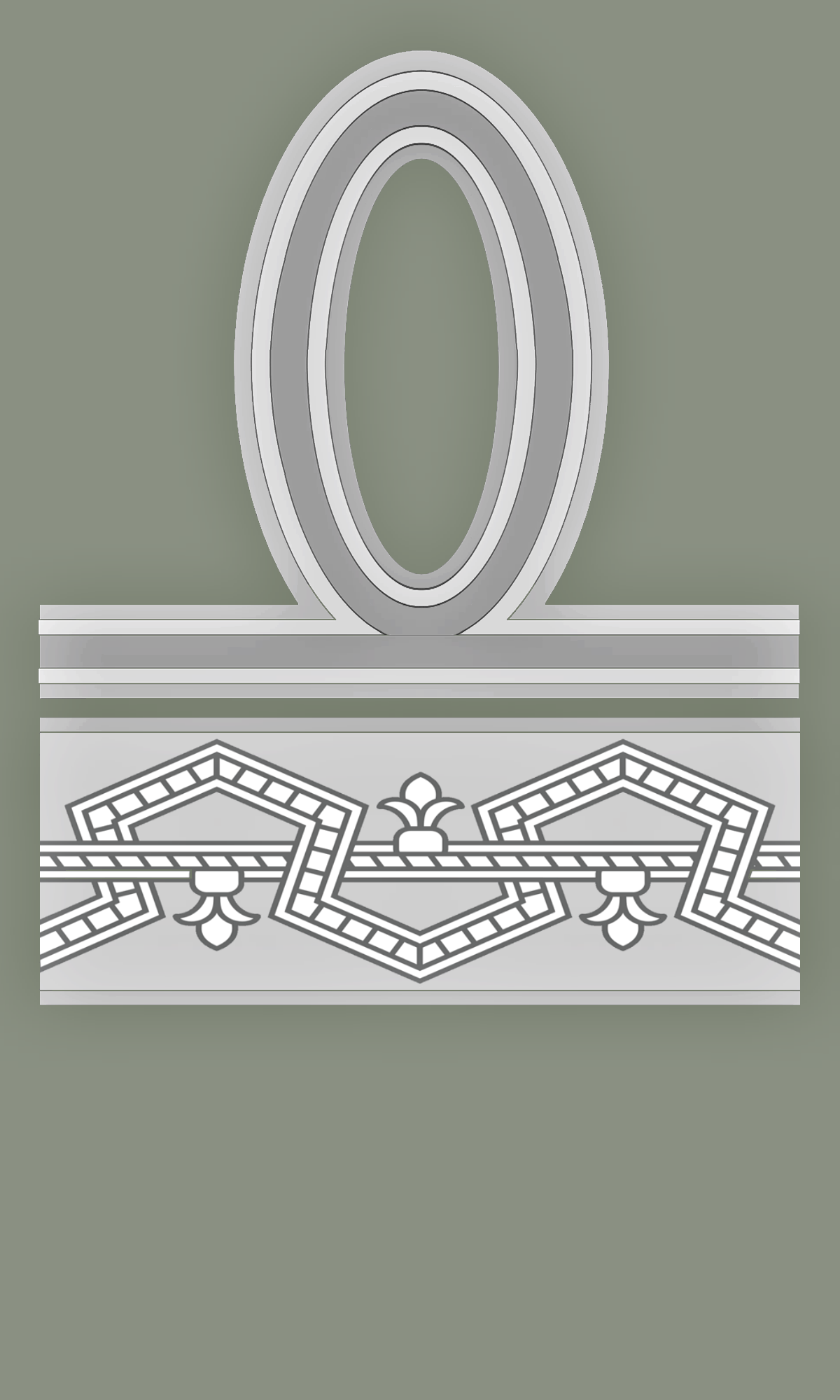
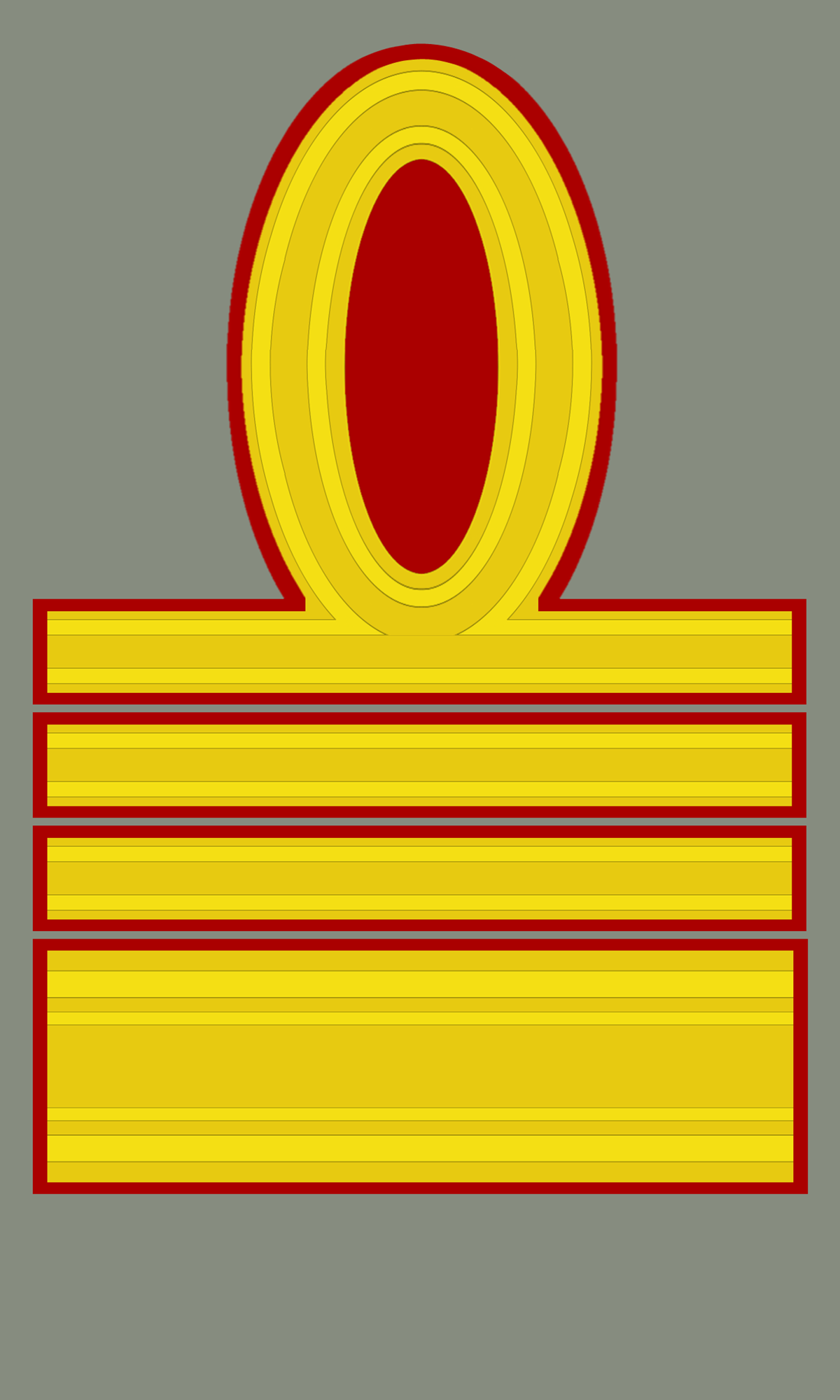
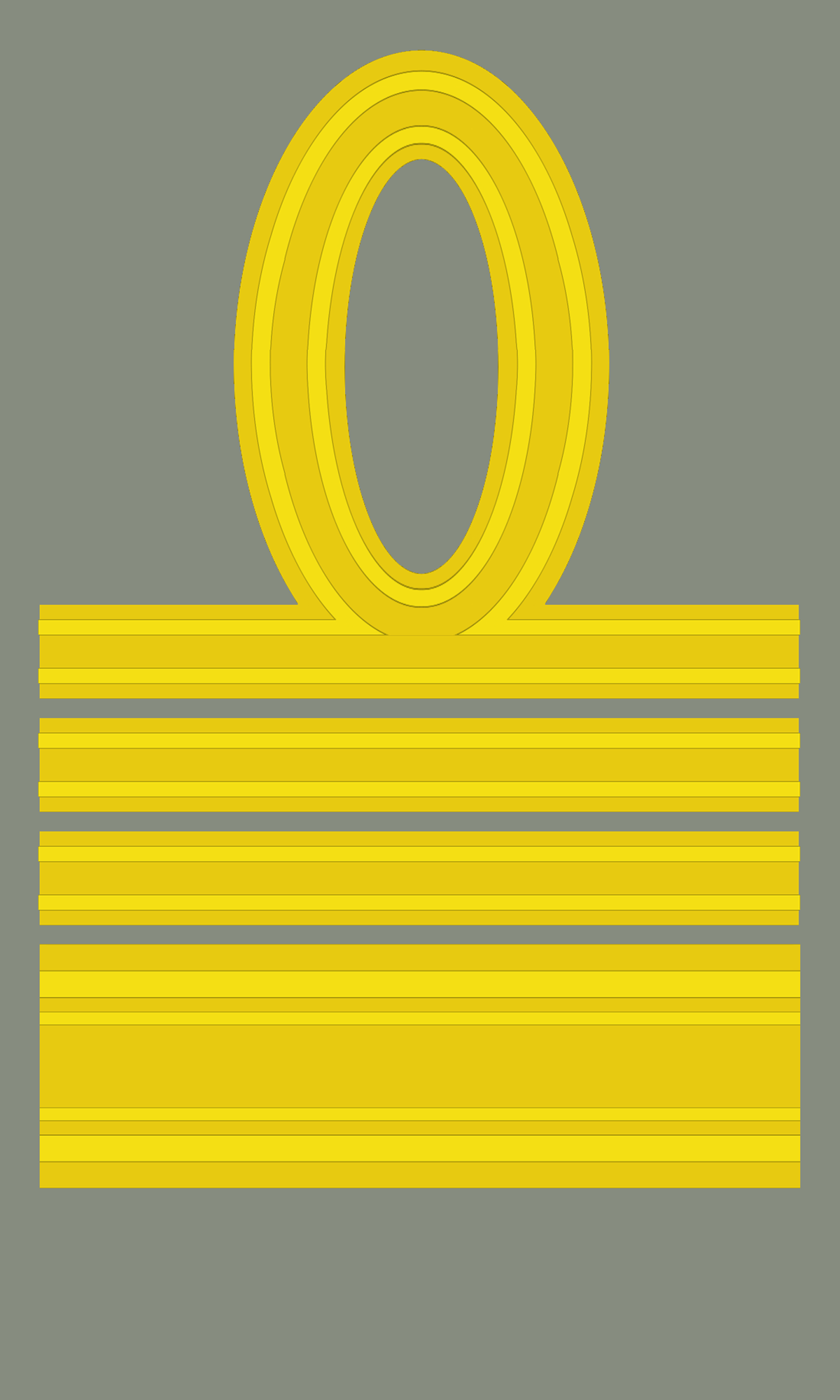
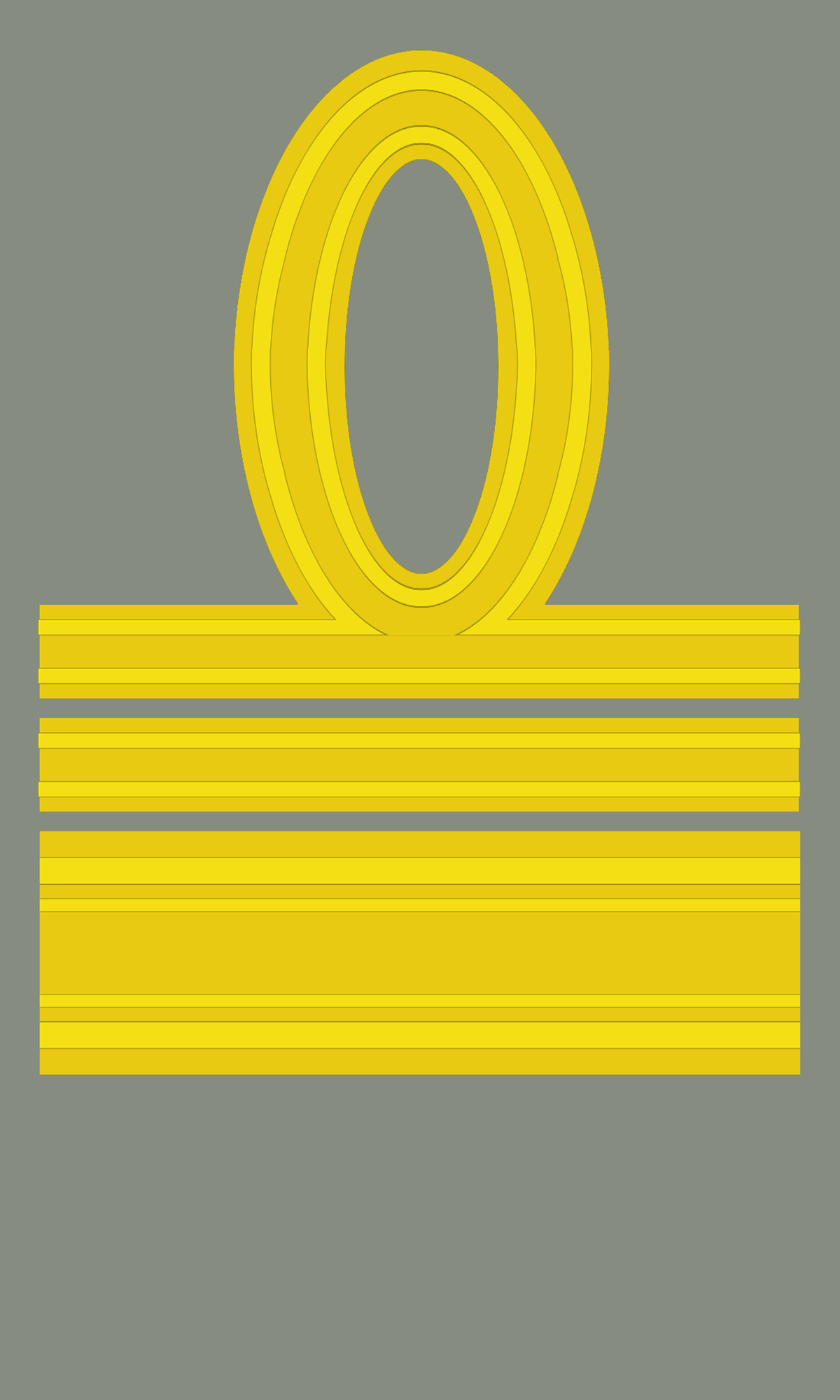
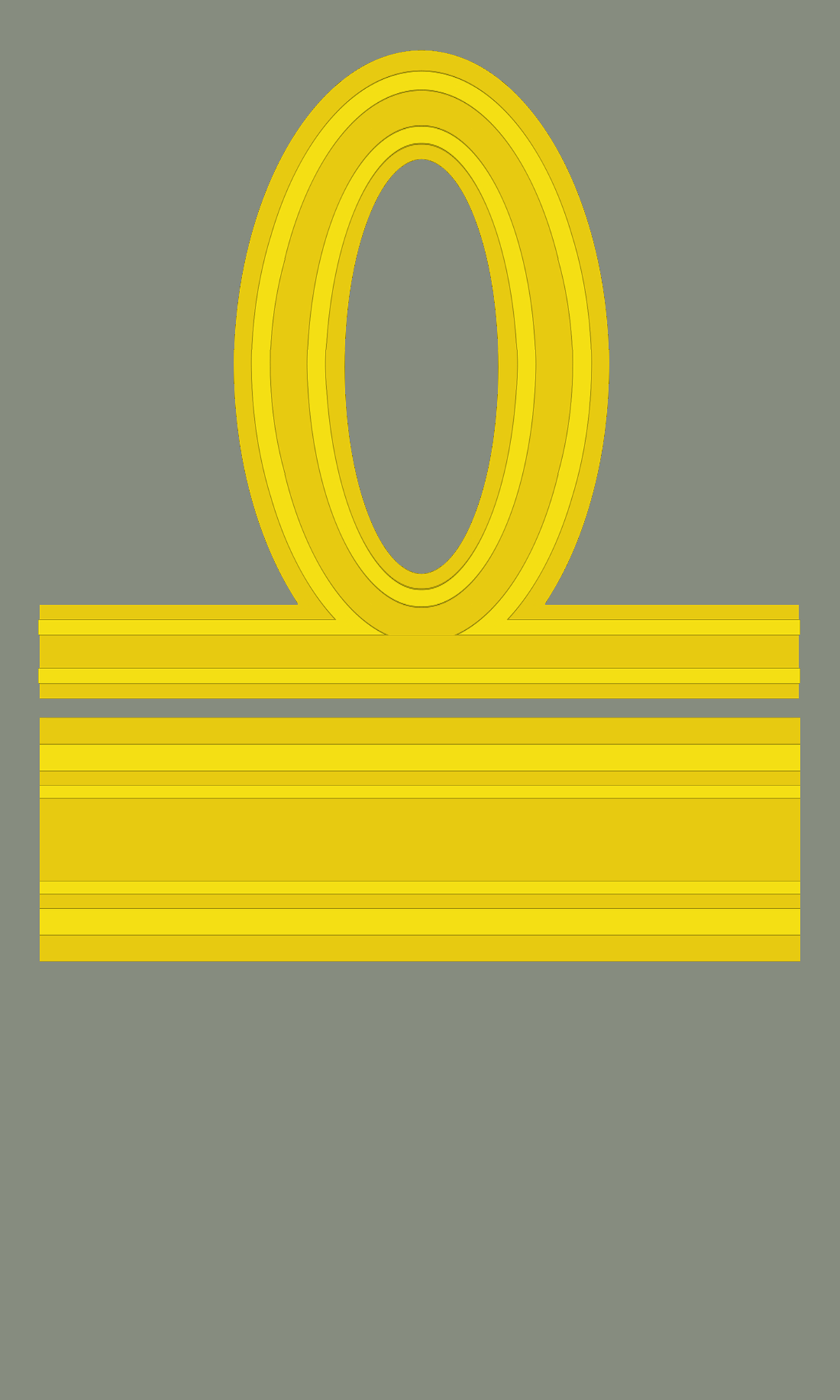
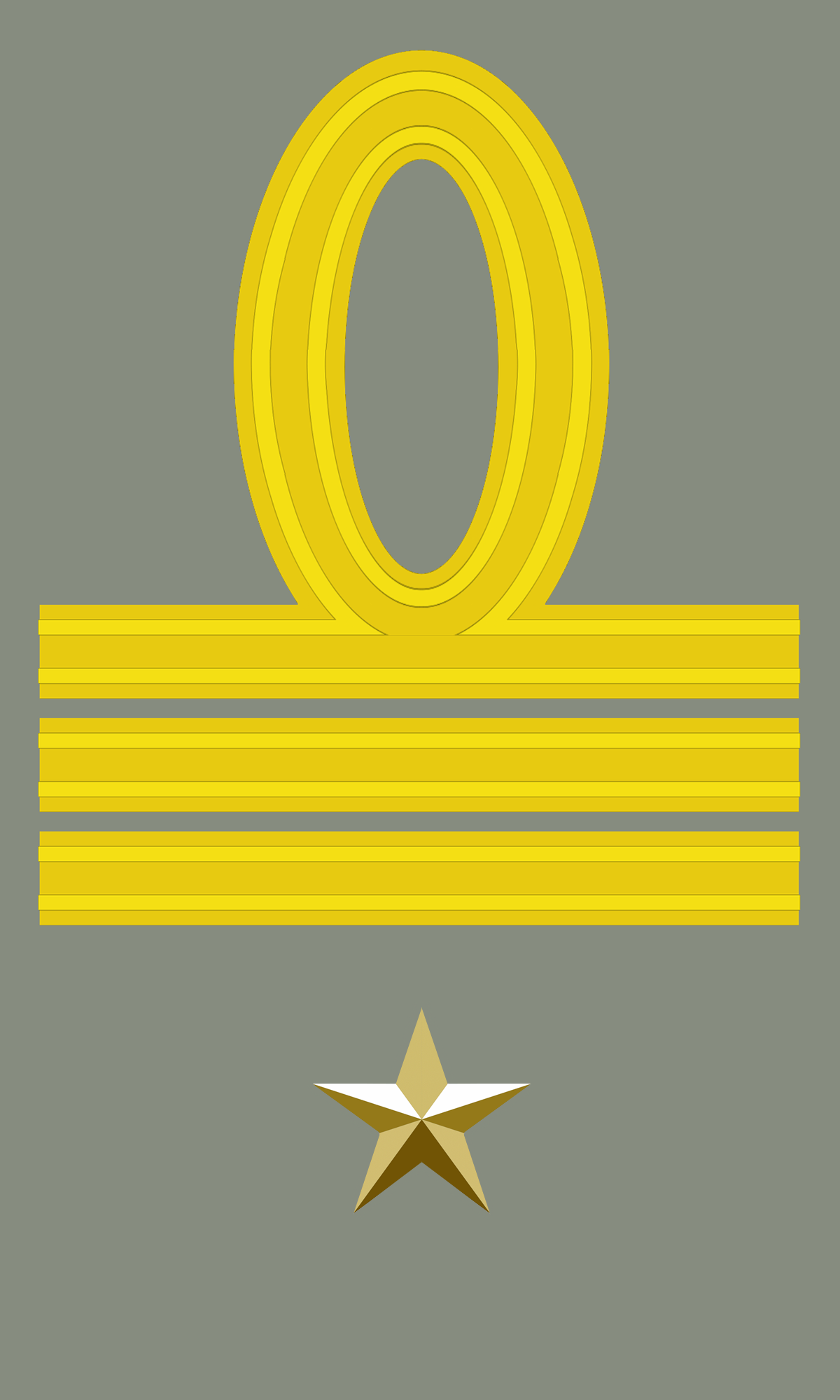
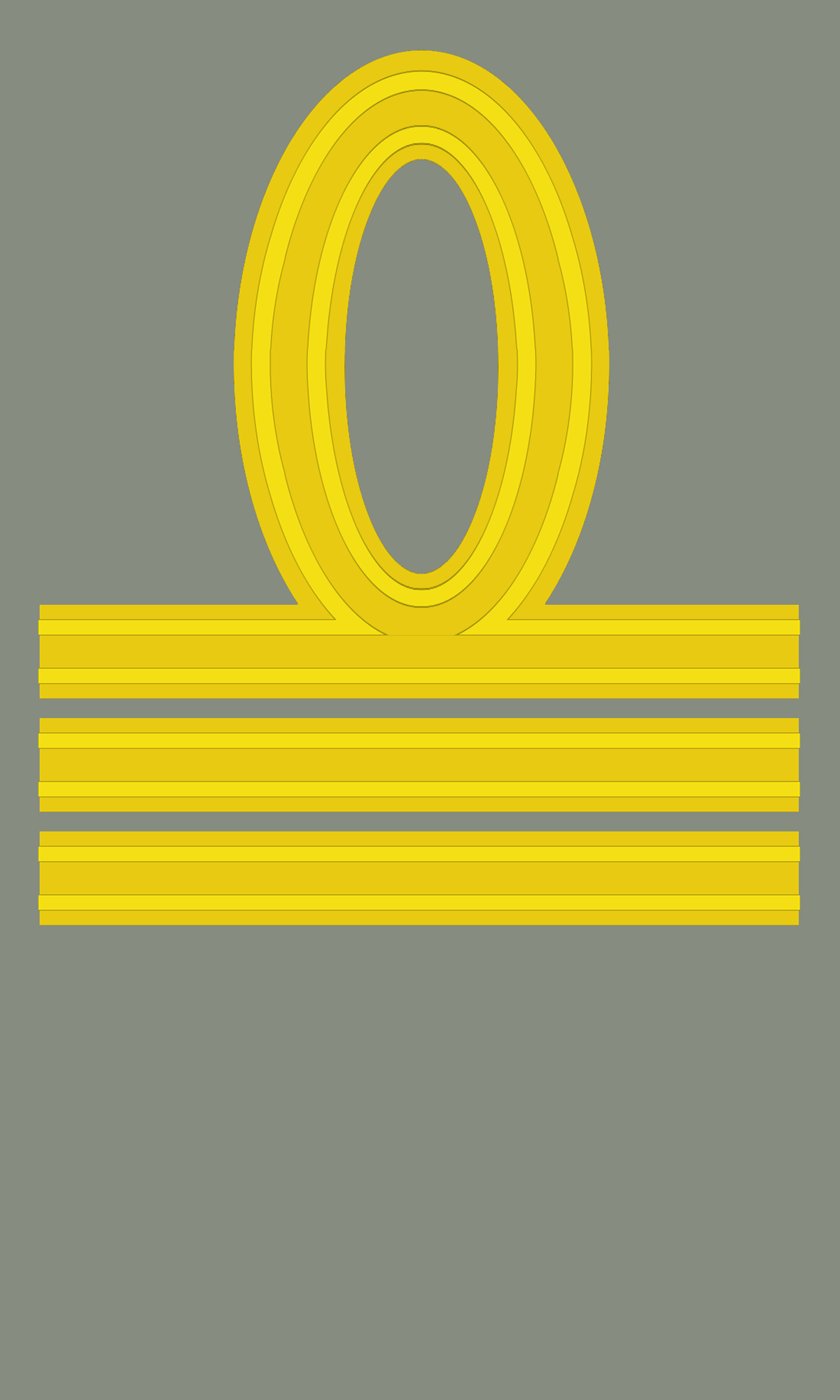
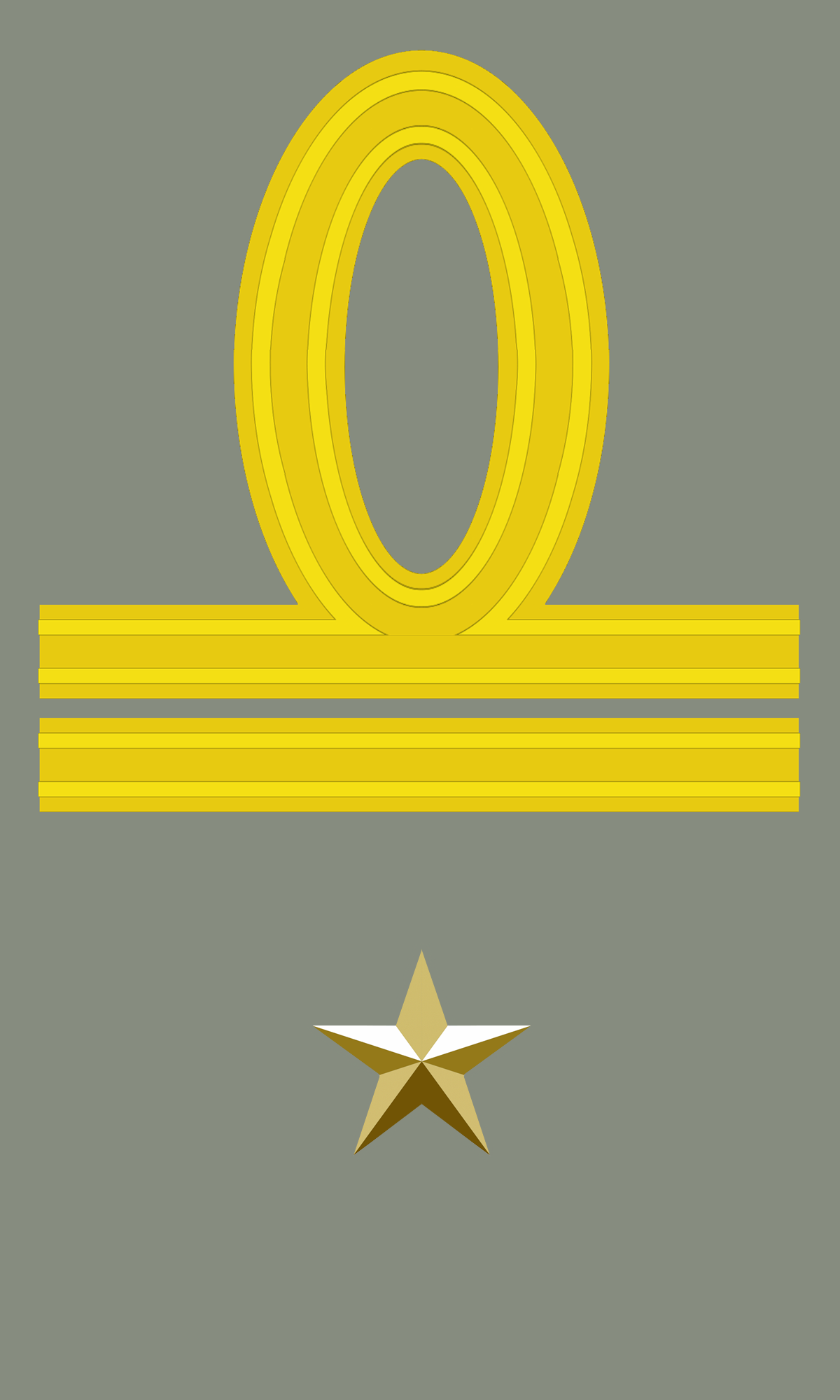
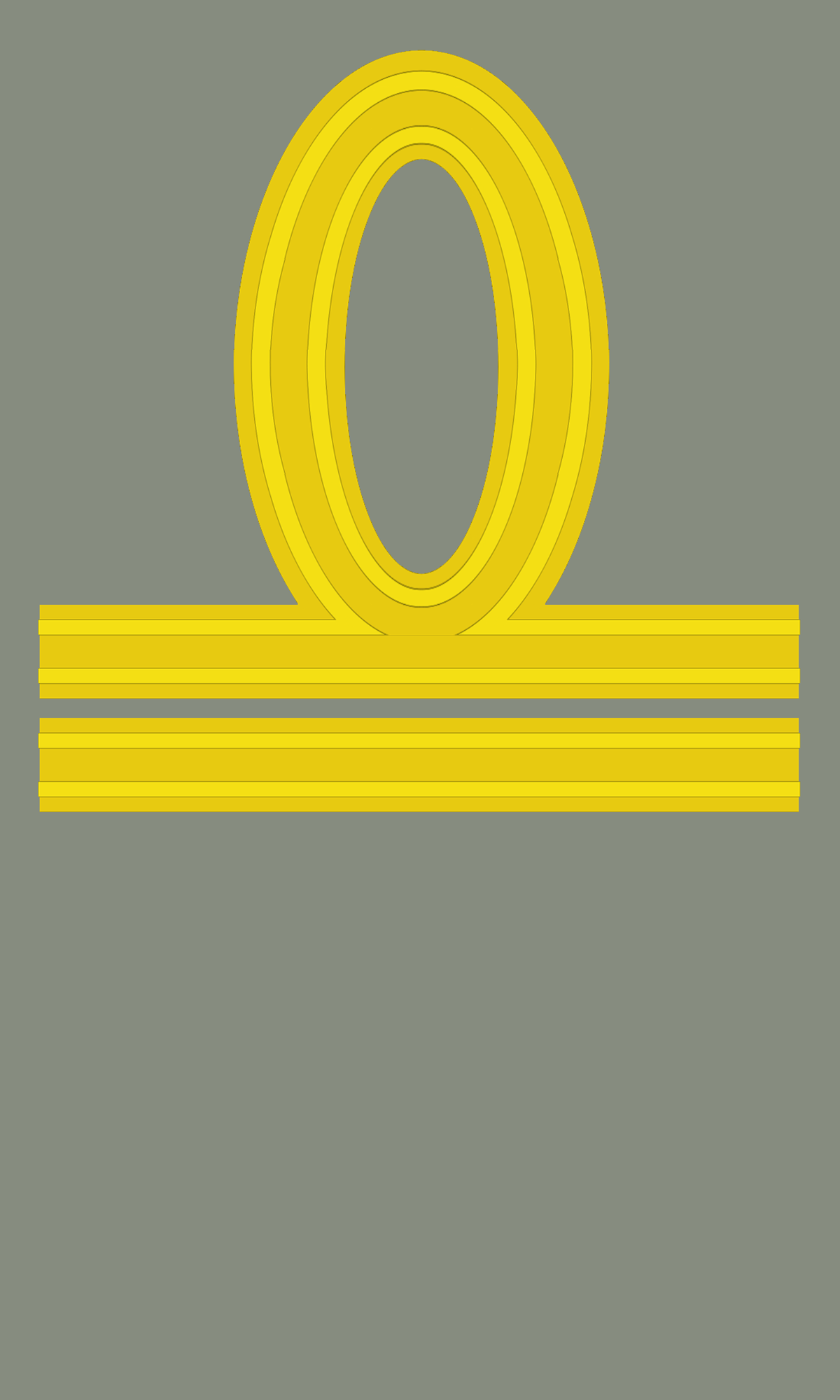
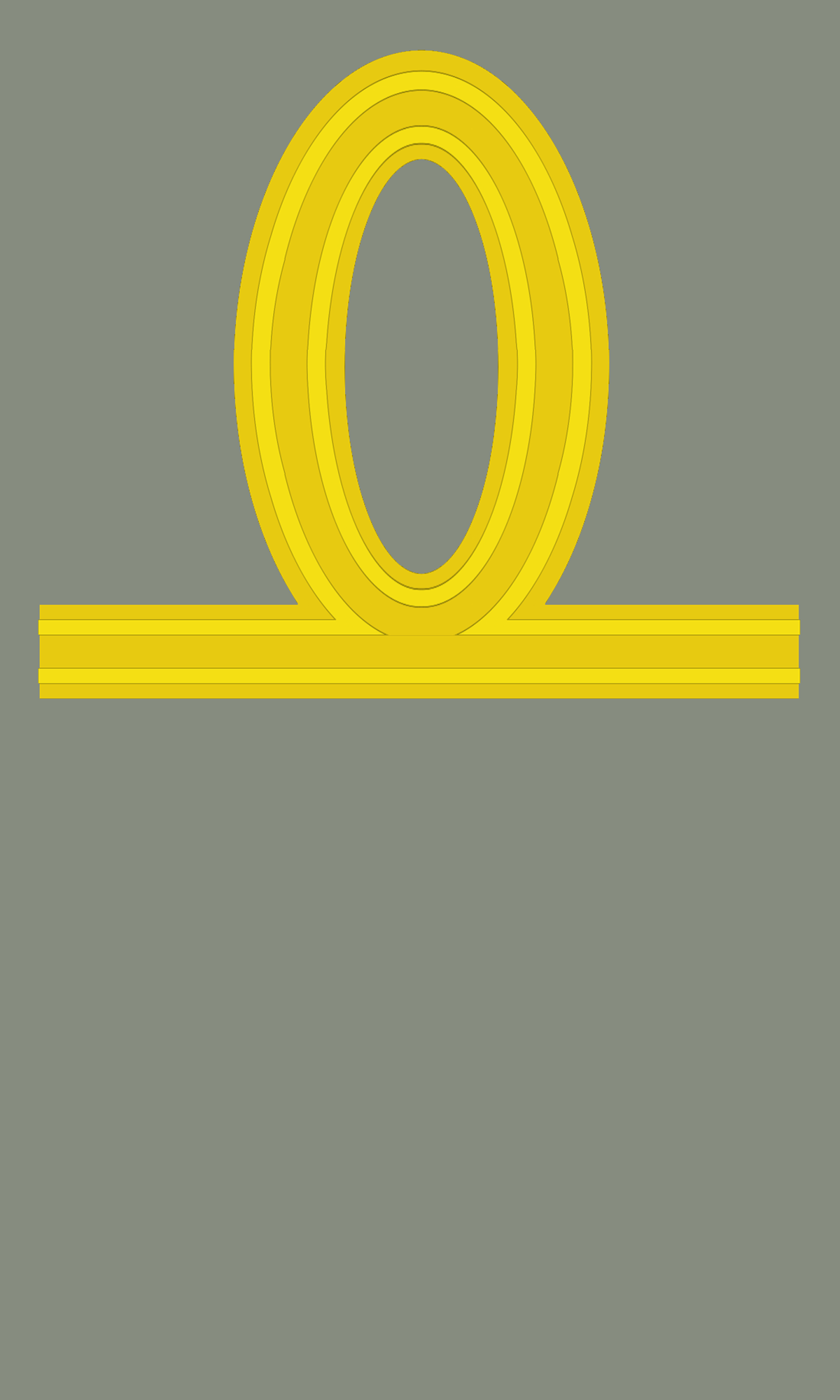
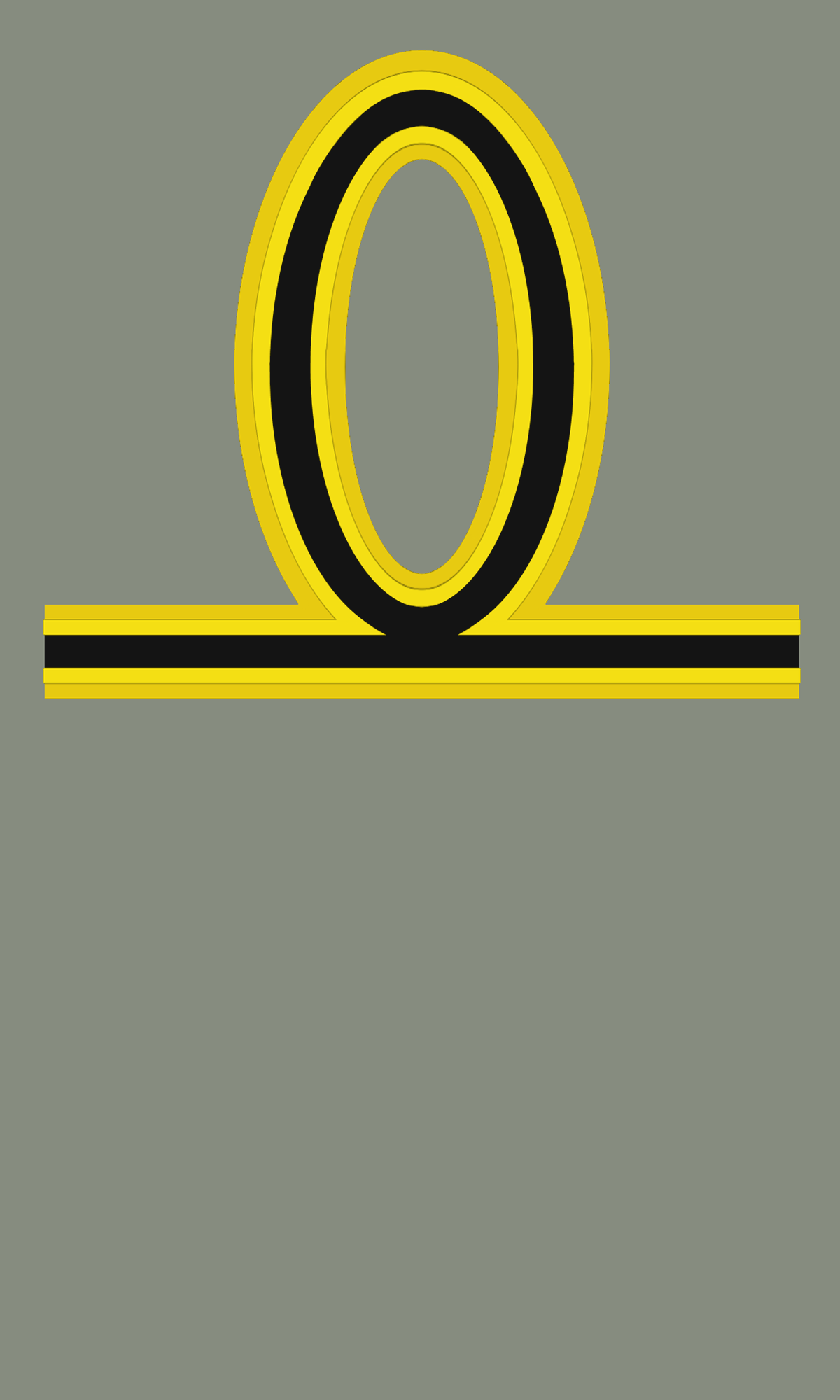
Rank group	General / flag officers						Senior officers				Junior officers
(Kingdom of Italy) Italy
(Kingdom of Italy) Italy	Maresciallo d'Italia	Generale d'Armata	Generale designato d'Armata	Generale di Corpo d'Armata	Generale di Divisione	Generale di Brigata	Colonnello Comandante	Colonnello	Tenente Colonnello	Maggiore	Primo capitano	Capitano	Primo Tenente	Tenente	Sottotenente	Aspirante

Special ranks

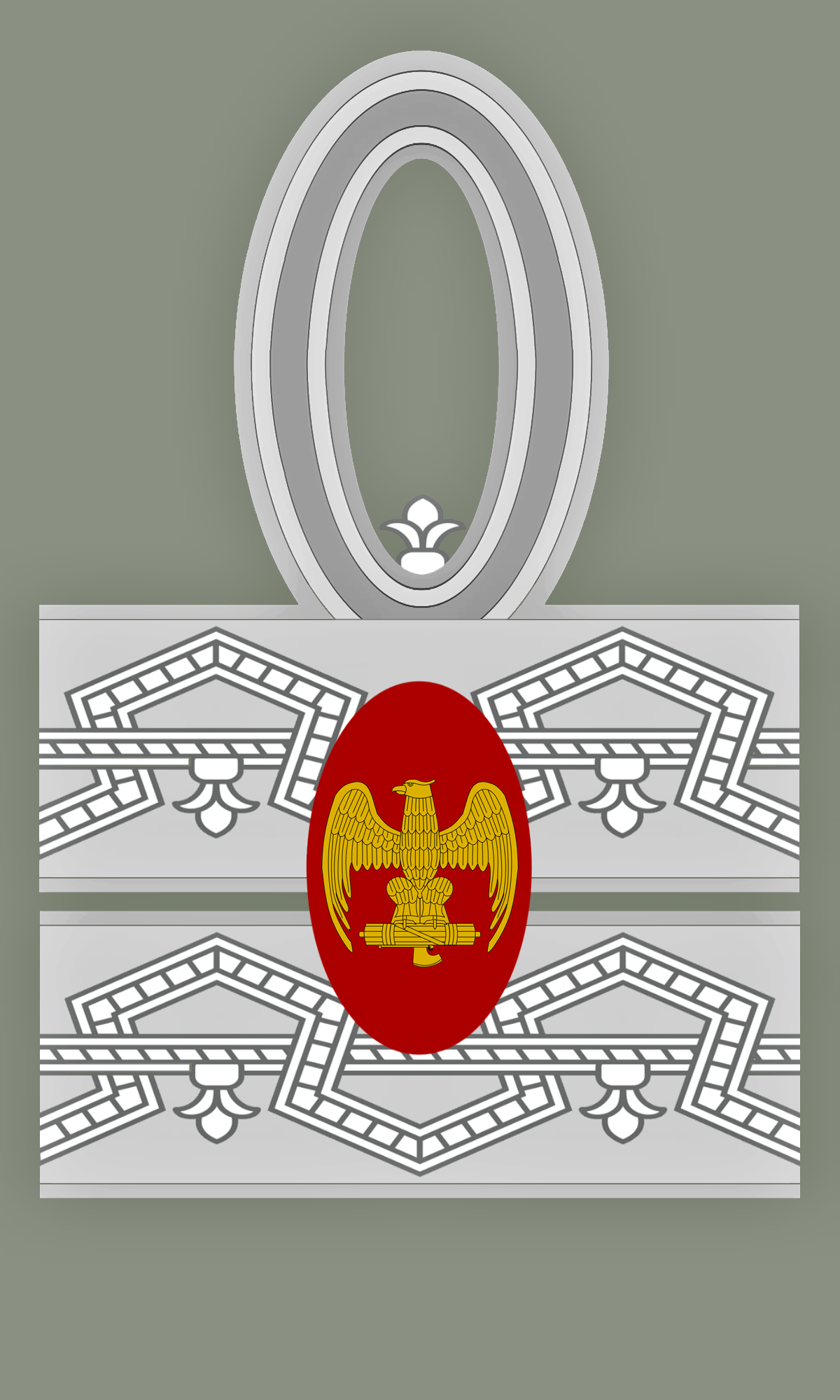
Primo maresciallo dell'Impero
First Marshal of the Empire

=== Soldiers, NCOs and warrant officers ===
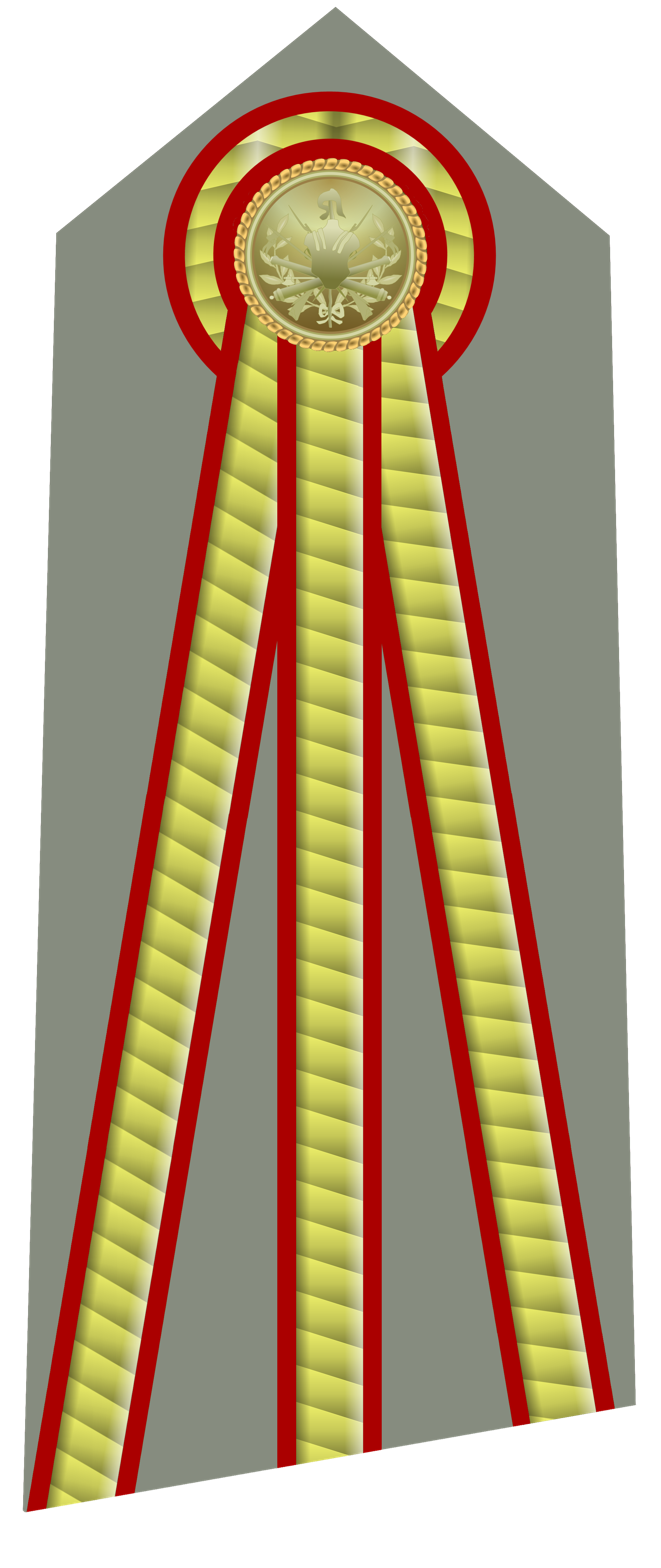
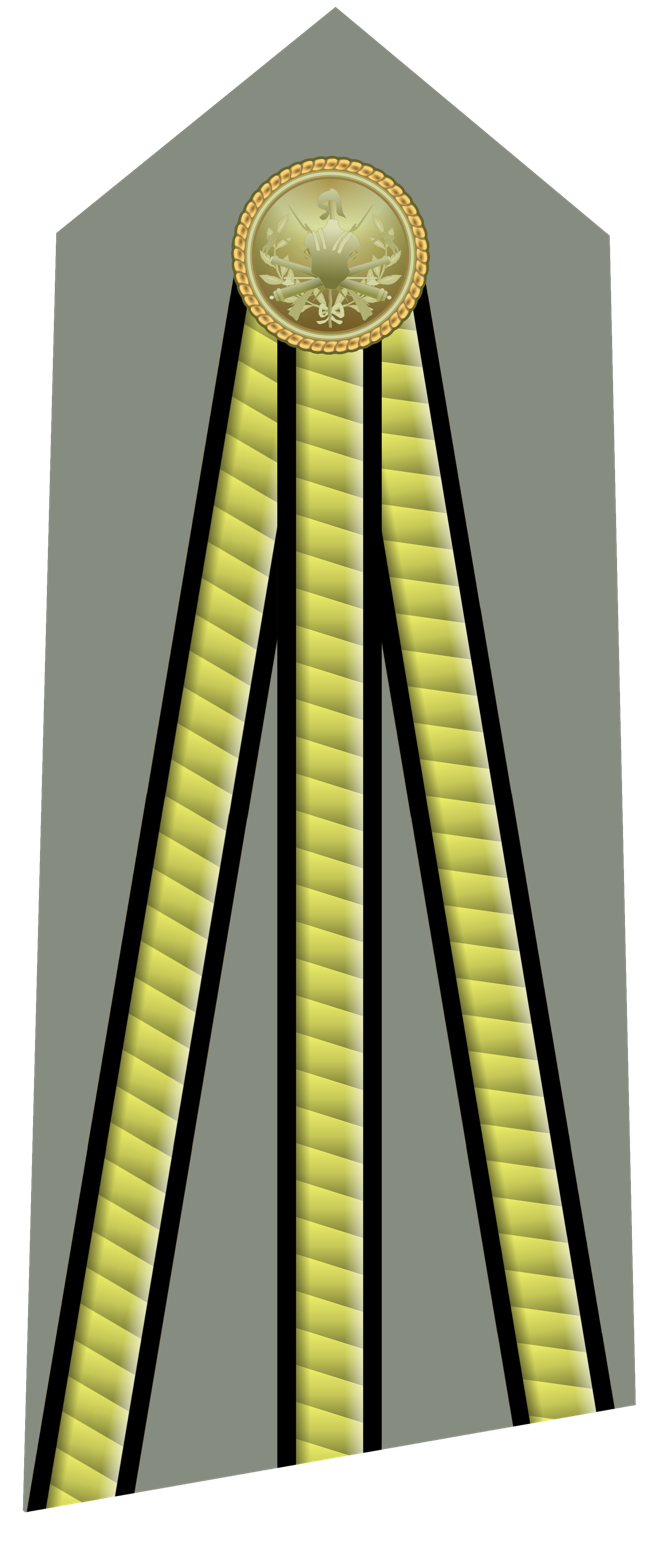
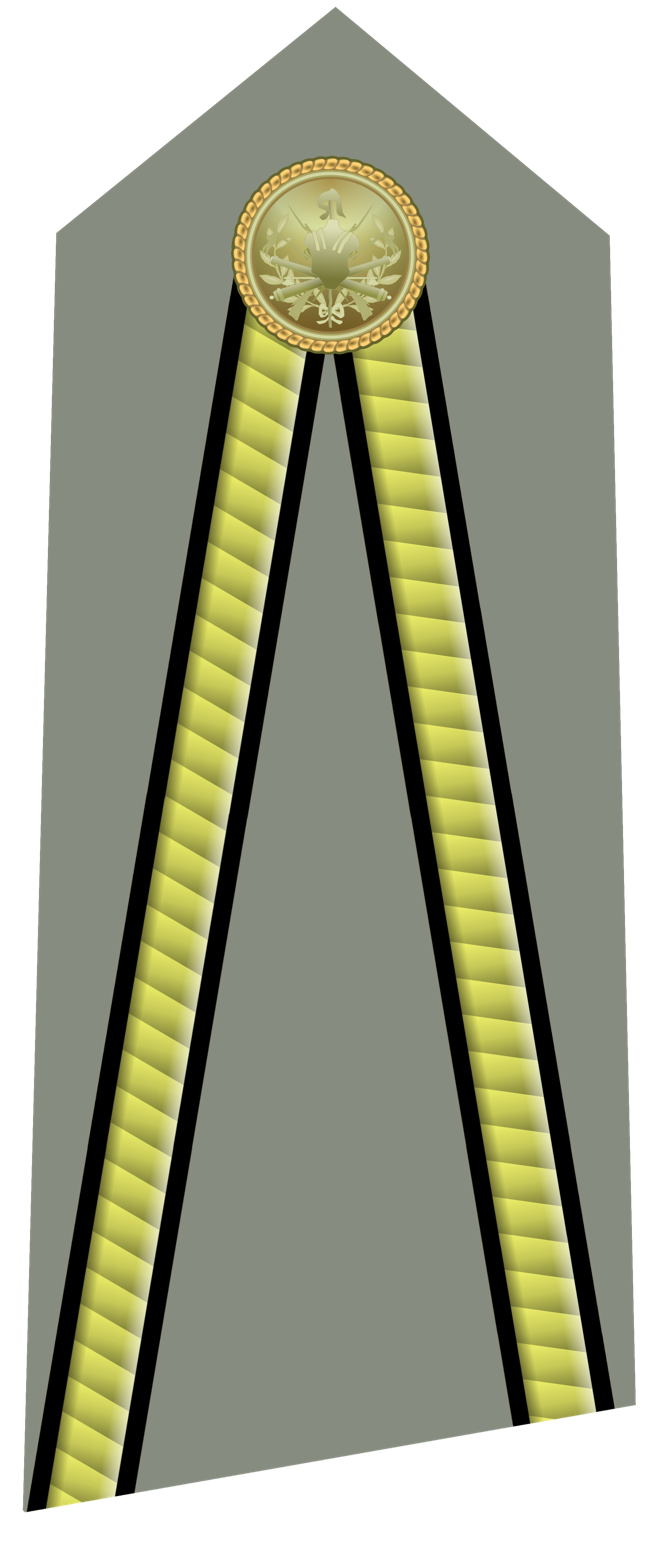
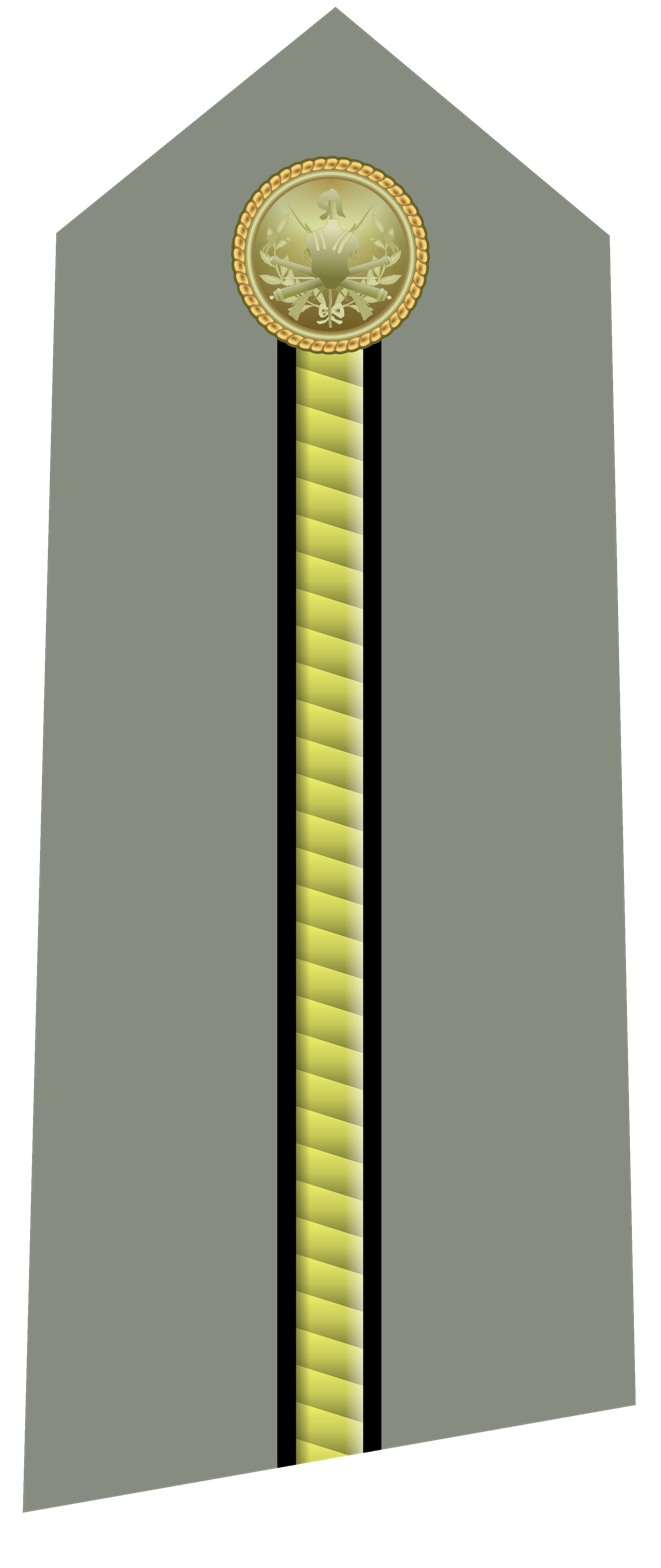
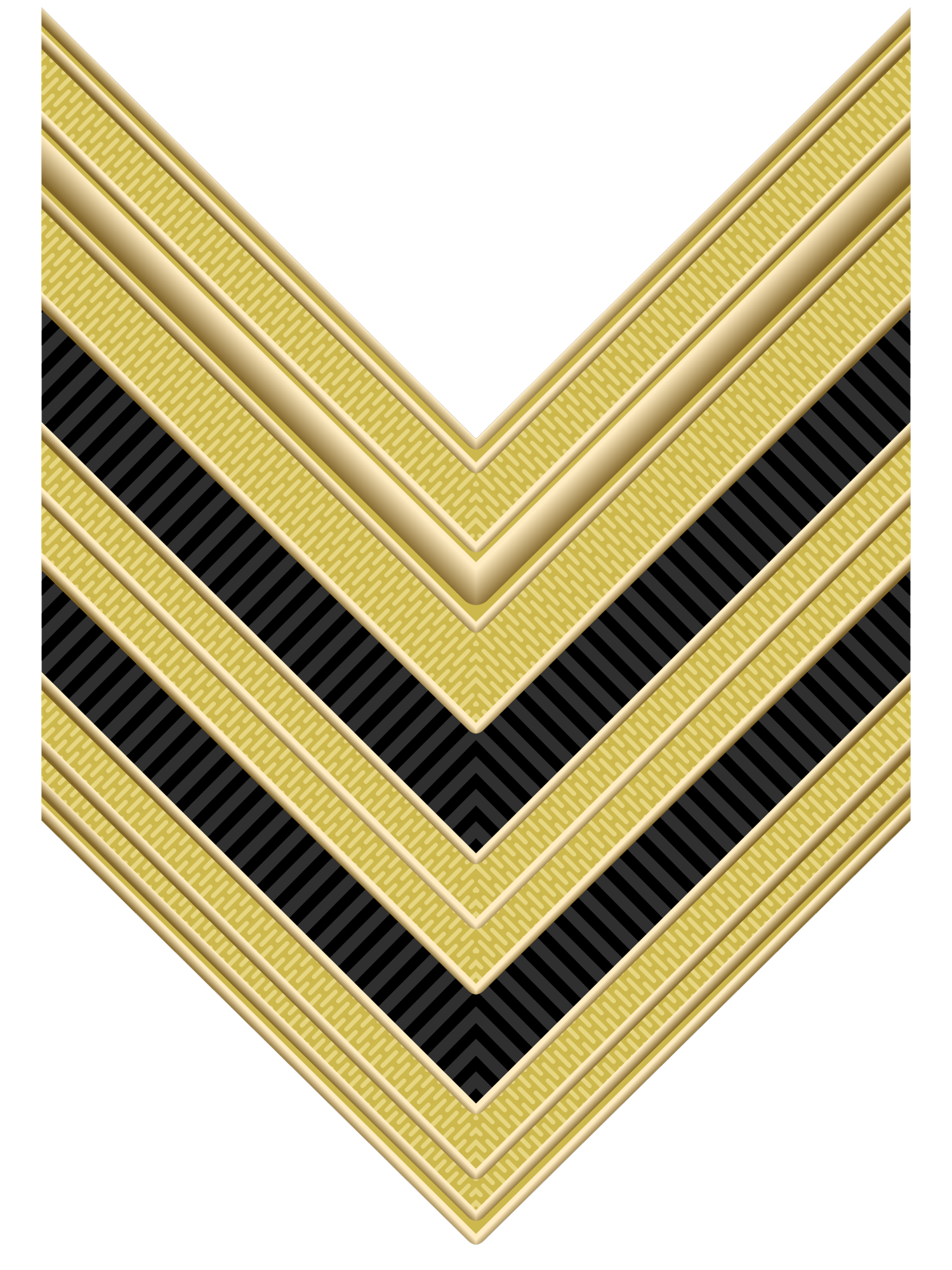
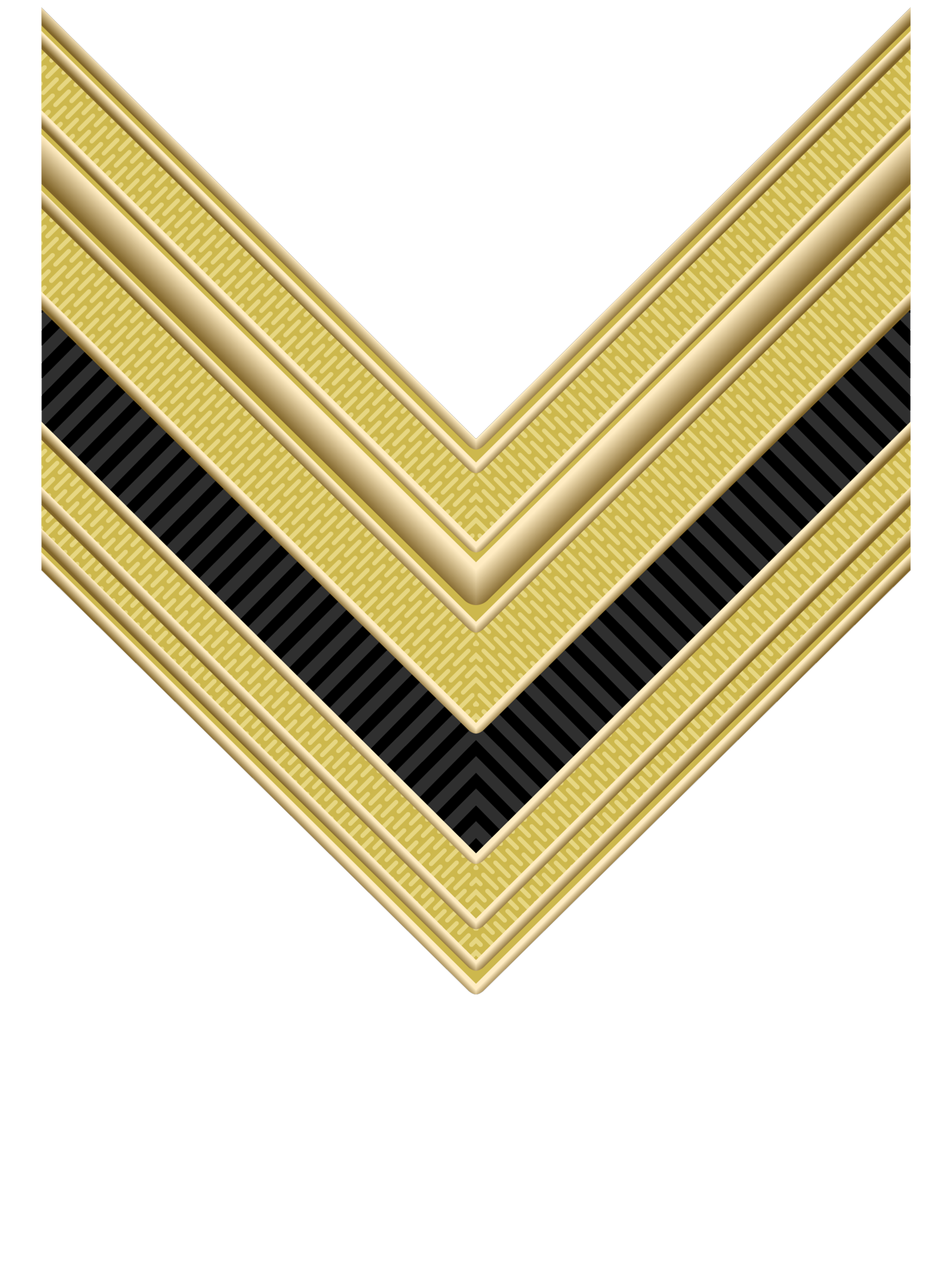
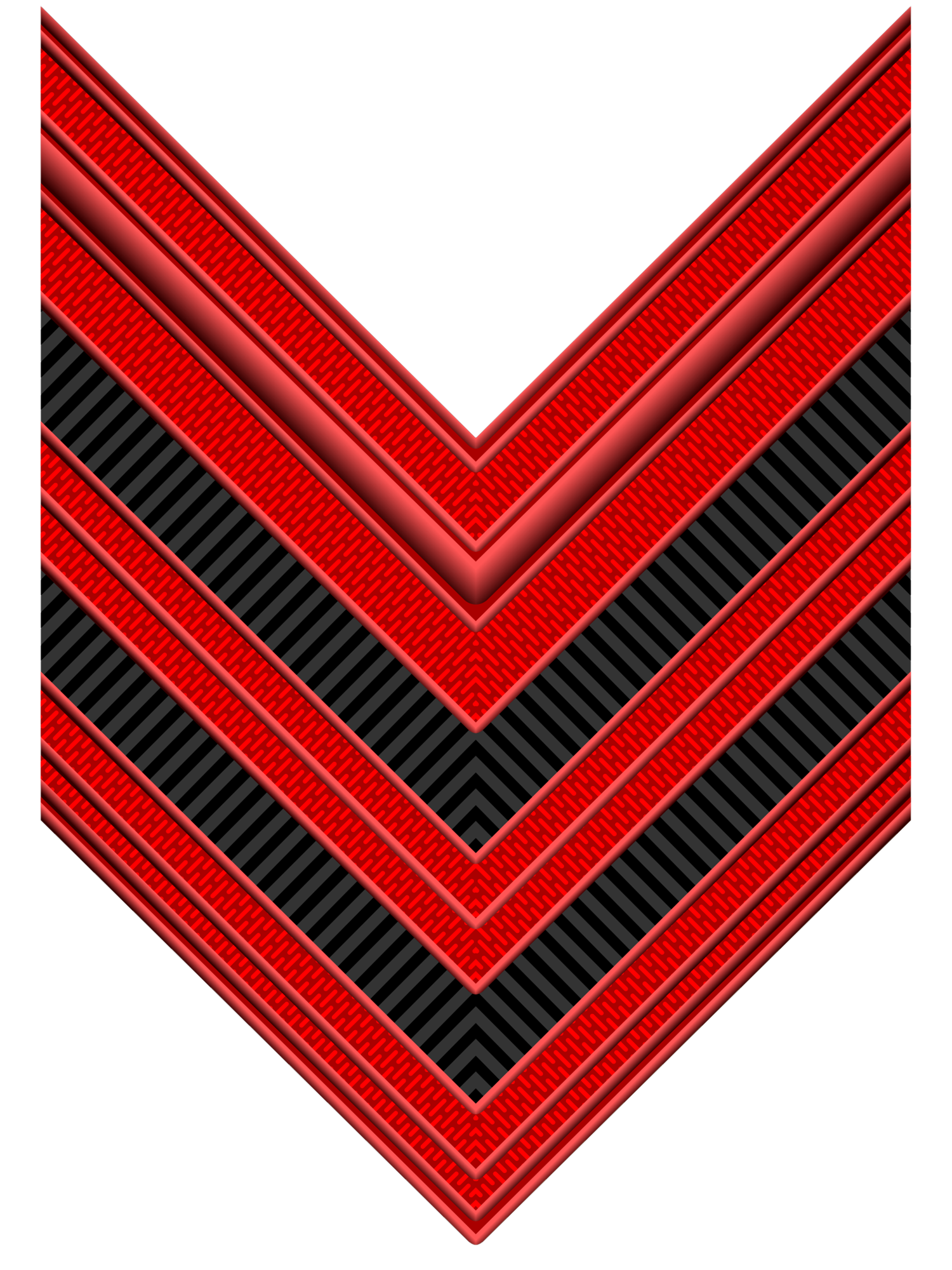
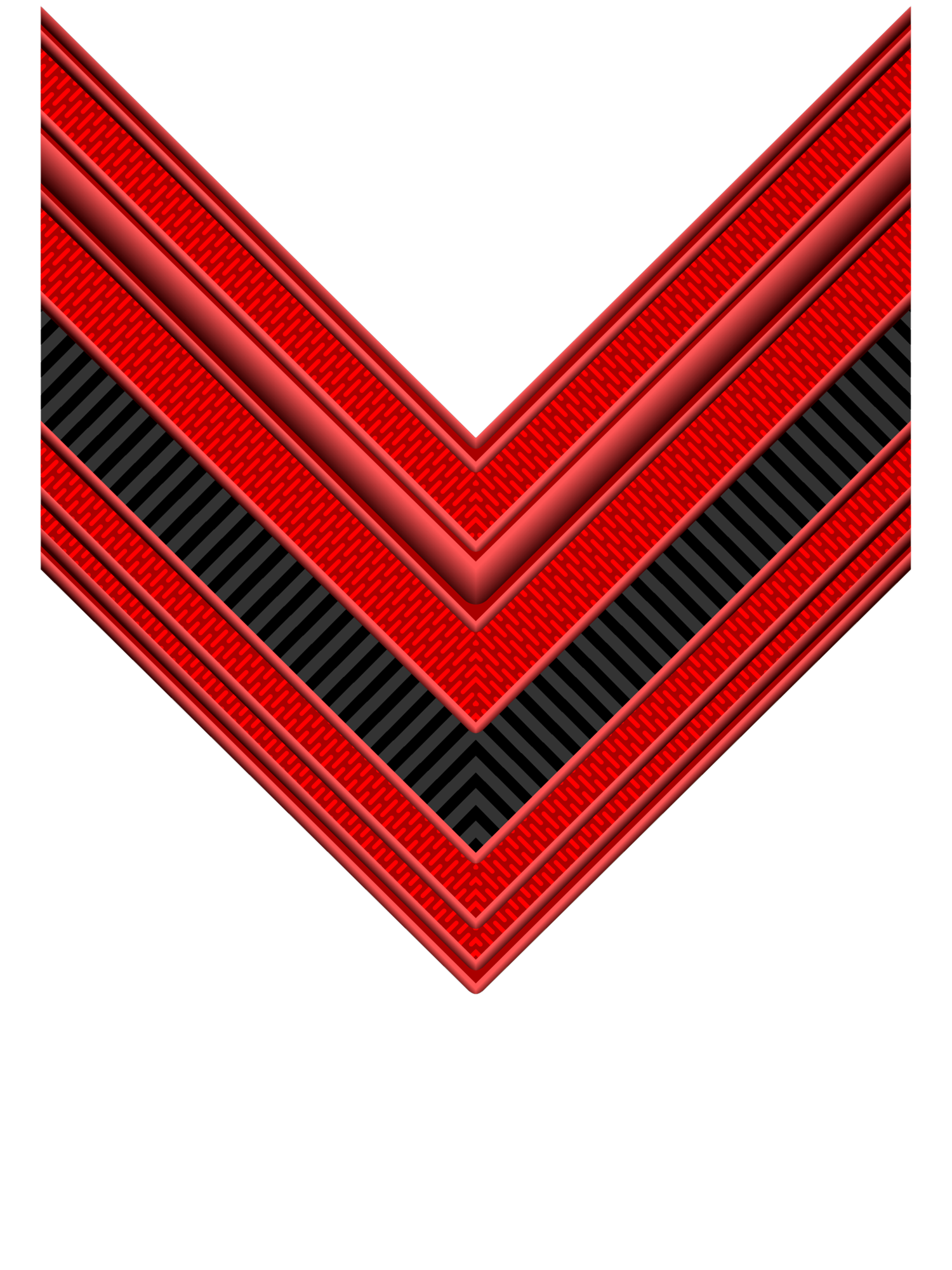
Rank group	Senior NCOs							Junior NCOs		Enlisted
(Kingdom of Italy) Italy					No equivalent			No equivalent			No insignia
(Kingdom of Italy) Italy	Aiutante di battaglia	Maresciallo maggiore	Maresciallo Capo	Maresciallo Ordinario	No equivalent	Sergente Maggiore	Sergente	No equivalent	Caporal Maggiore	Caporale	Soldato

== See also ==
- Military history of Italy during World War II
- "Italiani brava gente" — popular memory of the Italian Army's role in war crimes
- Comparative military ranks of World War II
- Italian Army equipment in World War II
- Blackshirts
- Black Brigades
- National Republican Guard (Italy)
- Republican Police Corps
- OVRA
- Italian 132nd Armored Division Ariete
- Anti-Communist Volunteer Militia (Italy)
- Regio Esercito – Royal Italian Army
- Royal Corps of Colonial Troops
- Italian African Police
- Carabinieri
- Battaglione Azad Hindoustan
- Italian Expeditionary Corps in Russia
- Regia Aeronautica – Royal Italian Air Force
- Corpo Aereo Italiano
- Regia Marina – Royal Italian Navy
- Decima Flottiglia MAS
- Italian Co-Belligerent Air Force
- Italian Co-Belligerent Army
- Italian Co-Belligerent Navy
- Italian Social Republic
- National Republican Air Force
- National Republican Navy (Italy)
- National Republican Army
- East African Campaign
- Italian conquest of British Somaliland
- Italian guerrilla war in Ethiopia
- Operation Compass
- Greco-Italian War
- Invasion of Yugoslavia
- Battle of Greece
- Battle of Gazala
- Italian occupation of Yugoslavia
- Italian occupation of France during World War II
- Axis occupation of Greece
- Italian war in Soviet Union, 1941–1943
- Isbuscenskij cavalry charge
- Italian Campaign (World War II)

== Sources ==
- De Felice, Renzo. Mussolini l'alleato: Italia in guerra (1940–1943). Mondadori Editore. Torino, 1990
- Jarrett, Colonel G. B. (1971). West of Alamein. Northridge, California: Sentry.
- Jowett, Philip (2001). The Italian Army 1940–45 (2): Africa 1940–43. Westminster, MD: Osprey. ISBN 9781855328655.
- Lamb, Richard. Mussolini as Diplomat
- Mollo, Andrew (1981). The Armed Forces of World War II. New York: Crown. ISBN 0-517-54478-4.
- Rodogno, Davide. Il nuovo ordine mediterraneo. Le politiche di occupazione dell'Italia fascista (1940–1943). Nuova cultura ed. Torino, 2002
- Walker, Ian W. (2006). Iron Hulls, Iron Hearts: Mussolini's Elite Armoured Divisions in North Africa. Wiltshire: Crowood Press. ISBN 1-86126-839-4.

== Recommended reading ==
- Blitzer, Wolf; Garibaldi, Luciano. Century of War. Friedman/Fairfax Publishers. New York, 2001. ISBN 1-58663-342-2
- Gooch, John. Mussolini's War: Fascist Italy from Triumph to Collapse, 1935–1943 Allen Lane. London, 2020 ISBN 9780241185704
- Guicciardini, Francesco. The History of Italy. Princeton University Press. Princeton, 1984 ISBN 0-691-00800-0.
- Liddell Hart, Basil H. History of the Second World War. Putnam's Sons. New York, 1970
- Mack Smith, Denis. Storia d'Italia. Editori Laterza, Roma–Bari, 2000 ISBN 88-420-6143-3
- Weinberg, Gerhard. A World at Arms: A Global History of World War II New York, 2005 ISBN 0-521-44317-2
