= Mussolini's War =

2020 book by John Gooch

Mussolini's War: Fascist Italy from Triumph to Collapse, 1935–1943
- Author: John Gooch
- Language: English
- Publisher: Pegasus Books
- Publication date: 6 May 2020
- Pages: 576
- ISBN: 978-0-14-198029-4

Mussolini's War: Fascist Italy from Triumph to Collapse, 1935–1943 is a book by John Gooch, published in 2020.

== Synopsis ==
Mussolini's War is an account of the rise and fall of Benito Mussolini, until 8 September 1943.

The book delves deep into the political, military, and social aspects of Fascist Italy, chronicling its trajectory from initial triumphs to eventual collapse.

Gooch begins by exploring Mussolini's rise to power and the consolidation of his dictatorship following the March on Rome in 1922. He highlights Mussolini's ambitions for a revived Roman Empire and the expansionist policies that led to Italy's invasion of Ethiopia in 1935, a pivotal event in shaping international perceptions of Fascist Italy.

The narrative unfolds against the backdrop of Italy's alliance with Nazi Germany and Mussolini's ambitions for territorial expansion in Europe. Gooch examines the complex dynamics within the Axis powers and Italy's military campaigns in North Africa, the Mediterranean, and the Balkans. He assesses Mussolini's strategic decisions, military capabilities, and the impact of these campaigns on Italy's economy and society.

Central to Gooch's analysis is the turning point of 1943, when Italy's military defeats, internal dissent, and Allied invasion of Sicily culminated in the collapse of Mussolini's regime. Gooch explores the political intrigues that led to Mussolini's ousting by King Victor Emmanuel III and the subsequent Italian armistice with the Allies on 8 September 1943.

The book also examines the complex legacy of Fascism in Italy, the repercussions of Mussolini's rule on Italian society, and the post-war trials of Fascist leaders. Gooch's narrative is enriched by archival research and provides a nuanced understanding of the motivations, ideologies, and consequences associated with Fascist Italy during this critical period of European history.

== Reception ==
Mussolini's War won the Royal United Services Institute's Duke of Wellington Medal for Military History for 2021. The book was also ranked 40th on The Daily Telegraph's list of the 50 best books of 2020.

Critical reception was generally favourable. Simon Heffer described the book as "a superb work of scholarship" and rated it four out of five stars, but criticised the book as "not as readable as it should be" and argued it "would have benefited from more anecdote". Tony Barber praised the book's readability, and praised the narrative as "lucid" and the analysis as "perfectly judged". Caroline Moorehead called the work as a "scrupulous account of Mussolini's wars" in her review for The Guardian. R. J. B. Bosworth reviewed the book for Literary Review. Max Hastings reviewed the book for The Times.
