= List of foreign vehicles used by Germany in World War II =

Many foreign vehicles were used by the Wehrmacht of Germany during World War II. The German terms Beutepanzer (Loot Tank) and Beutefahrzeug (Loot Vehicle) were a general application for those vehicles. Whilst the majority were captured, vehicles produced by occupied countries are also included.

Beutepanzers were usually repainted to sport distinctive national emblems and unit insignia in order to reduce friendly fire from other Axis forces.

== First World War ==
During World War I, the Germans had many Beutepanzers in their arsenal, far exceeding the production of their own tanks. Beutepanzers were given a German national cross and new camouflage. By the end of the war, a total of 170 Beutepanzers were still in running condition with 35 reported to be battle ready. In comparison, over a third of the 20 A7V tanks built by Germany had been destroyed or captured by then.

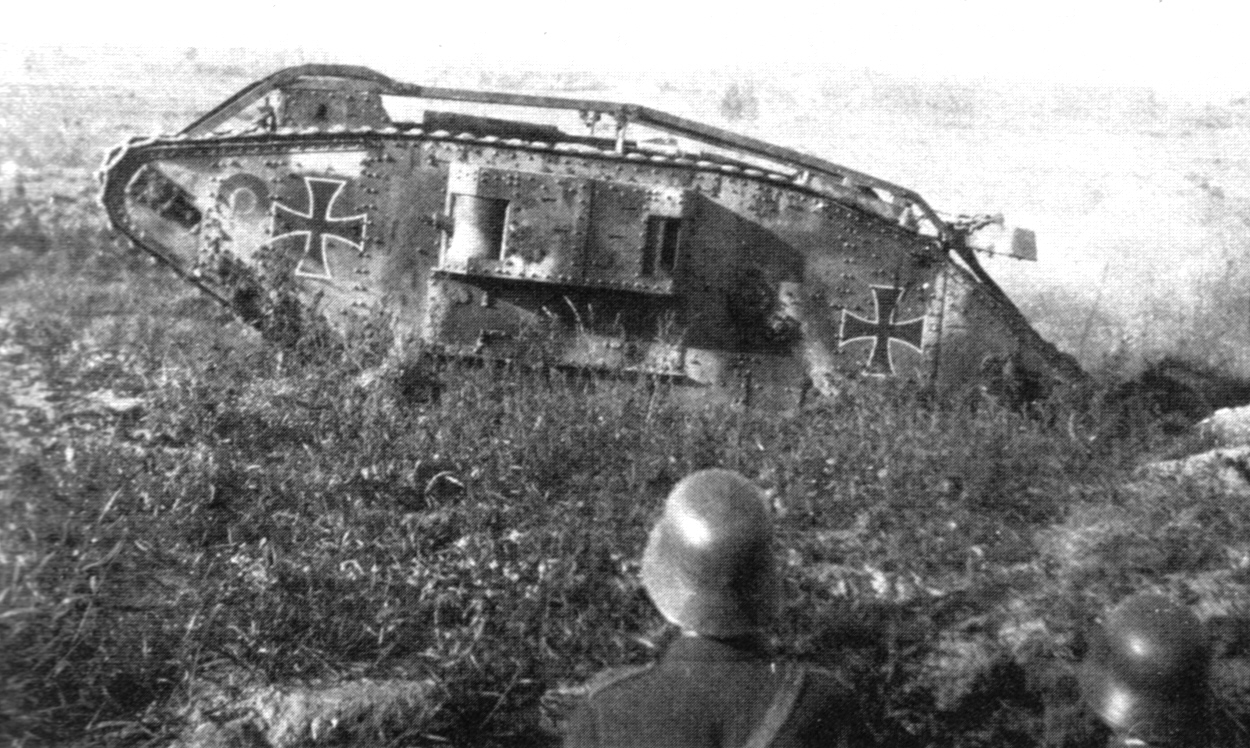
A British Mk IV Beutepanzer during WW1

Most Beutepanzers were British Mk IVs, but also a small amount of Whippet tanks and various types of French tanks were captured too. The Germans first captured Mk IVs during and after the Battle of Cambrai (1917). They were further modified including the replacement of their guns. They first saw action in March 1918, during Operation Michael and later during the Hundred Days Offensive. By the end of the first world war most tanks used by the Germans were beutepanzers.

== Second World War ==
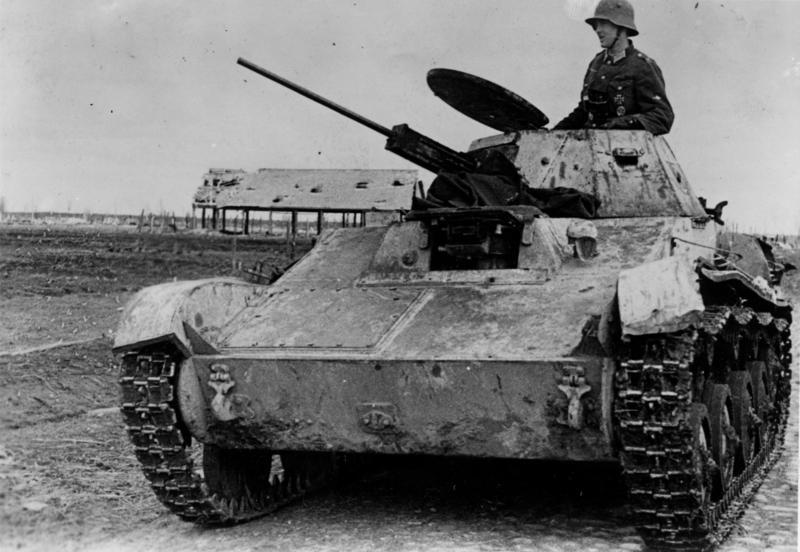
A captured Soviet T-60 pressed into service in the Kholm Pocket

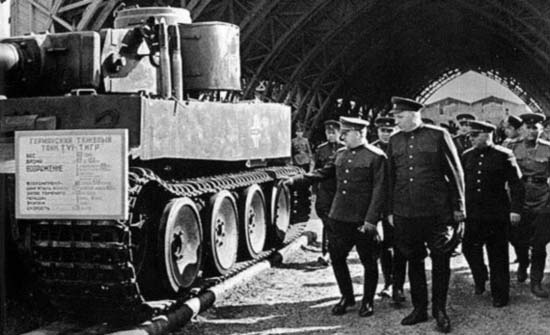
A Tiger 1 captured by the Soviets

Beutepanzers played an important role in the Wehrmacht. After the occupation of Czechoslovakia in 1939, many Czech tanks were claimed. In October 1940, the Heeresamt ordered two of each Beutepanzer type to be delivered to the Army Weapons Office for evaluation. Beutepanzers were used by the German Army on all fronts.

During the Western Campaign, Germany had captured 691 British tanks in total with an estimate of 350 being reusable. Most Beutepanzers captured during the campaign were modified into observation tanks or ammunition transports. Heavily damaged units were salvaged for spare parts. Additionally, roughly 1,800 modern (non-FT-17s) French tanks were captured during the May–June campaign and returned to service as Beutepanzers, alongside a similar number destroyed beyond repair.

The Germans captured many T-26 and BT tanks on the Eastern Front from 1941 to 1942.

The Germans were not the only users of captured tanks, though other nations usually did not deploy captured vehicles into combat. The Soviets were able to secure a Tiger 1 at Leningrad captured on 16 January 1943, with the British later capturing a Tiger 1 tank (Tiger 131) in Tunisia on the 21st of April 1943.

== Designation format ==
The Wehrmacht re-designated captured vehicles with a structured formula. With some of the elements being optional and depending on the overall vehicle type or intended use, the following elements could be utilized:

- Calibre (expressed in centimetres)
- The type of vehicle or main armament
- A model number (or name) adapted from the original designation
- A year
- A new series-related model number
- A subvariant, indicated with a number after a "/"
- A letter indicating the national origin of the vehicle

Vehicle type model numbers
Series	German	English
200	Panzerwagen	Armored cars
300	Halbkettenfahrzeuge	Half-tracks
400	Gepanzerte Halbkettenfahrzeuge	Armored half-tracks
600	Vollketten-Artilleriezugmaschinen	Fully-tracked artillery tractors
630	Gepanzerte Artilleriezugmaschinen	Armored artillery tractors
700	Panzer	Tanks
800	Waffenträger; Selbstfahrlafetten	Self-propelled artillery Self-propelled guns

Designations for countries of origin
Letter code	German	English
(a)	amerikanisch	American
(b)	belgisch	Belgian
(d)	dänisch	Danish
(e)	englisch	English
(f)	französisch	French
(g)	griechisch	Greek
(h)	holländisch	Dutch
(i)	italienisch	Italian
(j)	jugoslawisch	Yugoslavian
(n)	norwegisch	Norwegian
(ö)	österreichisch	Austrian
(p)	polnisch	Polish
(r)	russisch	Russian (Soviet)
(s)	schweizerisch	Swiss
(t)	tschechisch	Czechoslovak
(u)	ungarisch	Hungarian

== Vehicle types ==
=== Tanks ===
Tank designation
Short designation	Full designation	Vehicle type
Pz.Kpf.Wg.	Panzerkampfwagen	Tank
Flamm. Pz.Kpf.Wg.	Flammenwerfer Panzerkampfwagen	Flame tank
Inf. Pz.Kpf.Wg.	Infanterie Panzerkampfwagen	Infantry tank
Kr. Pz.Kpf.Wg.	Kreuzer Panzerkampfwagen	Cruiser tank
le. Pz.Kpf.Wg.	leichter Panzerkampfwagen	Light tank
Schw. Pz.Kpf.Wg.	Schwimm Panzerkampfwagen	Amphibious tank

=== Self-propelled guns ===
Vehicle designation
Short designation	Full designation	Vehicle type
StuG StuH	Sturmgeschütz Sturmhaubitze	Assault gun Assault howitzer
Pz.Jg. Jg.Pz.	Panzerjäger Jagdpanzer	Tank destroyer
G.W.	Geschützwagen	Gun carriage
Fgst.	Fahrgestell	Chassis
Sfl.	Selbstfahrlafette	Self-propelled gun

=== Other vehicles ===
Vehicle designation
Short designation	Full designation	Vehicle type
Pz.Beo.Wg.	Panzerbeobachtungswagen	Armoured observation vehicle
Pz.Sp.Wg.	Panzerspähwagen	Armored reconnaissance vehicle
Gep. MG.Tr.	Gepanzerter Maschinengewehrträger	Armored machine gun carrier
le. SPW	leichter Schützenpanzerwagen	Armored personnel carrier
Gep. M.Trsp.Wg.	Gepanzerter Mannschaftstransportwagen	Armored personnel carrier
Mun.Trsp.Kw.	Munitionstransportkraftwagen	Ammunition transport vehicle
S.	Schlepper	Tractor
Art. S.	Artillerieschlepper	Artillery tractor
Inf. S.	Infanterieschlepper	Infantry tractor
Zgkw.	Zugkraftwagen	Tractor

== Captured combat vehicles ==
List of some captured vehicles used by the German forces on the Western front, Russian front and others areas. Certain models were modified in factories or army workshops for infantry support, armed reconnaissance, antitank or antiaircraft units or as self-propelled guns or tank destroyers and many other operative or utility uses.

=== Tanks ===
==== Captured (with number designation) ====
Num.	Short designation	Tank	Type	Image	Notes
35(t)	Pz.Kpf.Wg. 35(t)	LT vz. 35	Light		
38(t)	Pz.Kpf.Wg. 38(t)	LT vz. 38	Light		
730(a)	Pz.Kpf.Wg. M1 730(a)	M1 Light	Light		
730(f)	Pz.Kpf.Wg. 17R 730(f)	Renault FT-17	Light		
730(f)	Pz.Kpf.Wg. 18R 730(f)	Renault FT-18	Light		
731(a)	Pz.Kpf.Wg. M2 731(a)	M1A2 Light	Light		
731(f)	Pz.Kpf.Wg. 35R 731(f)	Renault R35	Infantry (Light)		
731(h)	Pz.Kpf.Wg. FT 731(h)	Renault FT	Light		
731(i)	Pz.Kpf.Wg. L3/35 731(i)	Carro Veloce; L3/35	Tankette		
731(p)	Pz.Kpf.Wg. 7TP 731(p)	7TP	Light		
731(r)	Schw. Pz.Kpf.Wg. T-37 731(r)	T-37A	Light (Amphibious)		
732(a)	Pz.Kpf.Wg. M2A1 731(a)	M2A1 Light	Light		
732(f)	Pz.Kpf.Wg. D1 732(f)	Char D1	Infantry (Medium)		
732(i)	Pz.Kpf.Wg. L3/33 731(i) (Flamm.)	Carro Veloce; L3/33 Lf	Tankette (Flame)		
732(j)	Pz.Kpf.Wg. 732(j)	T-32 (Š-I-D)	Tankette		
732(r)	Schw. Pz.Kpf.Wg. T-38 732(r)	T-38	Light (Amphibious)		
733(e)	le. Pz.Kpf.Wg. Mk.II 733(e)	Light, Mk II	Light		
733(f)	Pz.Kpf.Wg. D2 733(f)	Char D2	Infantry (Medium)		
733(i)	Pz.Kpf.Wg. L6 733(i)	Carro Armato; L6/40	Light		
733(r)	Schw. Pz.Kpf.Wg. T-40 733(r)	T-40	Light (Amphibious)		
734(e)	le. Pz.Kpf.Wg. Mk.IV 734(e)	Light, Mk IV	Light		
734(f)	Pz.Kpf.Wg. 35H 734(f)	Hotchkiss H35	Cruiser (Light)		
734(i)	Pz.Kpf.Wg. M11/39 734(i)	Carro Armato; M11/39	Medium		
734(r)	Pz.Kpf.Wg. T-27A 734(r)	T-27A	Tankette		
735(e)	le. Pz.Kpf.Wg. Mk.VI B 735(e)	Light, Mk VIB	Light		
735(f)	Pz.Kpf.Wg. 38H 735(f) Pz.Kpf.Wg. 39H 735(f)	Hotchkiss H38 Hotchkiss H39	Cruiser (Light)		
735(i)	Pz.Kpf.Wg. M40 735(i)	Carro Armato; M13/40	Medium		
736(e)	le. Pz.Kpf.Wg. Mk.VI C 736(e)	Light, Mk VIC	Light		
736(f)	Pz.Kpf.Wg. 40R 736(f)	Renault R40	Infantry (Light)		
736(i)	Pz.Kpf.Wg. M41 736(i)	Carro Armato; M14/41	Medium		
736(r)	Pz.Kpf.Wg. MS 736(r)	MS-1	Light		
737(a)	le. Pz.Kpf.Wg. M2A3 737(a)	M2A3 Light	Light		
737(e)	le. Pz.Kpf.Wg. Mk.VII 737(e)	Light, Mk VII, Tetrarch	Light		
737(f)	Pz.Kpf.Wg. FCM 737(f)	FCM 36	Infantry (Light)		
737(i)	Pz.Kpf.Wg. P40 737(i)	Carro Armato; P40	Medium		
737(r)	Pz.Kpf.Wg. T-26A 737(r)	T-26; Model 1931	Light		
738(b) 738(f)	Pz.Kpf.Wg. AMC 738(b) Pz.Kpf.Wg. AMC 738(f)	Renault; AMC 35	Cruiser (Medium)		
738(e)	m. Pz.Kpf.Wg. Mk IIA 738(e)	Vickers Medium; Mark IIA	Medium		
738(i)	Pz.Kpf.Wg. M42 738(i)	Carro Armato; M15/42	Medium		
738(r)	Pz.Kpf.Wg. T-26B 738(r)	T-26; Model 1933	Light		
739(a)	m. Pz.Kpf.Wg. Mk III 739(e)	Vickers Medium; Mark III	Medium		
739(f)	Pz.Kpf.Wg. 35S 739(f)	Somua S35	Cruiser (Medium)		
739(r)	Flamm. Pz.Kpf.Wg. T-26B 739(r)	KhT-130	Light (Flame)		
740(a)	Pz.Kpf.Wg. M2A4 740(a)	M2A4 Light	Light		
740(e)	s. Pz.Kpf.Wg. Mk II 740(e)	Vickers A1E1; Independent	Medium		
740(f)	Pz.Kpf.Wg. B2 740(f)	Char B1	Infantry (Heavy)		
740(r)	Pz.Kpf.Wg. T-26C 740(r)	T-26; Model 1939	Light		
741(e)	Kr. Pz.Kpf.Wg. Mk.I 741(e)	Cruiser, Mk I	Cruiser		
741(f)	Pz.Kpf.Wg. 3C 741(f)	Char 2C	Infantry (Super-heavy)		
742(e)	Kr. Pz.Kpf.Wg. Mk.II 742(e)	Cruiser, Mk II	Cruiser		
742(r)	Pz.Kpf.Wg. BT 742(r)	BT series	Light		
743(e)	Kr. Pz.Sp.Wg. Mk.III 743(e)	Cruiser, Mk III	Cruiser		
743(r)	Pz.Kpf.Wg. T-60 743(r)	T-60	Light		
744(e)	Kr. Pz.Kpf.Wg. Mk.IV 744(e)	Cruiser, Mk IV	Cruiser		
745(e)	Kr. Pz.Kpf.Wg. Mk.V 745(e)	Cruiser, Mk V, Covenanter	Cruiser		
746(a)	Pz.Kpf.Wg. M2 747(a)	M2 Medium	Medium		
746(e)	Kr. Pz.Kpf.Wg. Mk.VI 746(e)	Cruiser, Mk VI, Crusader	Cruiser		
746(r)	Pz.Kpf.Wg. T-28 746(r)	T-28	Medium		
747(a)	Pz.Kpf.Wg. M3 747(a)	M3 Lee	Medium		
747(e)	Inf. Pz.Kpf.Wg. Mk.I 747(e)	Infantry, Mk I, Matilda	Infantry		
747(r)	Pz.Kpf.Wg. T-34/76A 747(r)	T-34; Model 1940	Medium		
747(r)	Pz.Kpf.Wg. T-34/76B 747(r)	T-34; Model 1941	Medium		
747(r)	Pz.Kpf.Wg. T-34/76C 747(r)	T-34; Model 1942	Medium		
747(r)	Pz.Kpf.Wg. T-34/76D 747(r) Pz.Kpf.Wg. T-34/76E 747(r) Pz.Kpf.Wg. T-34/76F 747(r)	T-34; Model 1943	Medium		
747(r)	Pz.Kpf.Wg. T-34/85 747(r)	T-34-85	Medium		
748(a)	Pz.Kpf.Wg. M4 748(a)	M4 Sherman	Medium		
748(a)	Pz.Kpf.Wg. M4A2 748(a)	M4A2 Sherman	Medium		Lend Lease-only tank
748(a)	Pz.Kpf.Wg. M4A3 (76)W (a)	M4A3(76)W; Sherman	Medium		
748(a)	Pz.Kpf.Wg. M4A4 748(a) "Firefly"	M4A4 Sherman; Firefly	Medium		
748(e)	Inf. Pz.Kpf.Wg. Mk.II 748(e)	Infantry, Mk II, Matilda	Infantry		
748(r)	Pz.Kpf.Wg. T-28V 748(r)	T-28E	Medium		
749(e)	Inf. Pz.Kpf.Wg. Mk.III 749(e)	Infantry, Mk III, Valentine	Infantry		
751(r)	Pz.Kpf.Wg. T-35A 751(r)	T-35	Heavy		
752(r)	Pz.Kpf.Wg. T-35C 752(r)	SMK	Heavy		
753(r)	Pz.Kpf.Wg. KW-1A 753(r)	KV-1; Model 1940	Heavy		
754(r)	Pz.Kpf.Wg. KW-2 754(r)	KV-2	Heavy		
755(r)	Pz.Kpf.Wg. KW-1B 755(r)	KV-1E	Heavy		
756(r)	Pz.Kpf.Wg. KW-1C 756(r)	KV-1; Model 1941	Heavy		

==== Captured (without number designation) ====
Short designation	Tank	Type	Image	Notes
Pz.Kpfw. M3 (a)	M3 Stuart	Light		
Pz.Kpfw M3A1 (a)	M3A1 Stuart	Light		
Pz.Kpfw M3A3 (a)	M3A3 Stuart	Light		
Pz.Kpfw. M5 (a)	M5 Stuart	Light		
Pz.Kpfw M5A1 (a)	M5A1 Stuart	Light		
Kr. Pz.Kpfw. Mk.VIII (e)	Cruiser, Mk VIII, Cromwell	Cruiser		
Kr. Pz.Kpfw. Mk.VIII (e)	Cruiser, Mk VIII, Centaur	Cruiser		
Inf. Pz.Kpfw. Mk.IV (e)	Infantry, Mk IV, Churchill	Infantry		
Pz.Kpfw. T-70 (r)	T-70	Light		
Pz.Kpfw. T-80 (r)	T-80	Light		
Pz.Kpfw. JS (r)	IS-2	Heavy		

==== Modified ====
Modified Tanks
Num.	Short designation	Tank	Type	Notes
731(f)	Pz.Kpf.Wg. 35R 731(f) mit T-26 Turm	Renault R35 (w/ T-26 M1939 turret)	Infantry (Light)	
748(e)	5 cm KwK 38 L/42 auf Inf. Pz.Kpfw. Mk.II 748(e)	Infantry, Mk II, Matilda (w/ 5 cm KwK 38 L/42)	Infantry	Named "Oswald" by crew
756(r)	Pz.Kpf.Wg. KW-1C 756(r) mit 7.5 cm KwK 40 L/43	KV-1 Model 1941 (w/ 7.5 cm KwK 40 L/43)	Heavy	

=== Command vehicles ===
Converted command vehicles
Number	Short designation	Vehicle chassis	Type	Notes
735(f)	Pz.Beo.Wg. 38H(f)	Hotchkiss H38		

=== Self-propelled guns and artillery ===
==== Captured ====
Num.	Short designation	Vehicle	Type	Image
430(a)	Sfl. M3 430(a)	M3 GMC	Tank destroyer	
770(i)	StuG L6 mit 47/32 (i)	Semovente L40 da 47/32	Assault gun	
801(b)	Pz.Jg. (Sfl.); CL 801(b)	Carden-Loyd Mk VI (47 mm SA F.R.C.)	Tank destroyer	
801(i)	Gep. Sfl. 90/53 (i)	Semovente M41M da 90/53	Self-propelled gun	
802(b)	Pz.Jg. VA 802(b)	T-13	Tank destroyer	
850(i)	StuG M40 mit 75/18 (i) StuG M41 mit 75/18 (i) StuG M42 mit 75/18 (i)	Semovente M40 da 75/18 Semovente M41 da 75/18 Semovente M42 da 75/18	Assault gun	
851(i)	StuG M42 mit 75/34 (i) StuG M43 mit 75/34 (i)	Semovente M42 da 75/34 Semovente M43 da 75/34	Assault gun	
852(i)	StuG M43 mit 75/46 (i)	Semovente M43 da 75/46	Assault gun	
853(i)	StuG M43 mit 105/25 (i)	Semovente M43 da 105/25	Assault howitzer	
854(i)	StuG M43 mit 150/42 (i)	Semovente M43 da 149/40	Self-propelled gun	
	Sfl. T-48 (a)	T48 GMC	Tank destroyer	
	Pz.Jg. M10 (a)	M10 GMC	Tank destroyer	
	Pz.Jg. M18 (a)	M18 GMC	Tank destroyer	
	Pz.Jg. M36 (a)	M36 GMC	Tank destroyer	
	StuG 76 (r)	SU-76i	Assault gun	
	Pz.Jg. SU-76 (r)	SU-76M	Self-propelled gun	
	Jg.Pz. SU-85 (r)	SU-85	Tank destroyer	
	Jg.Pz. SU-100 (r)	SU-100	Tank destroyer	
	StuH SU-122 (r)	SU-122	Assault howitzer	
	StuH SU-152 (r)	SU-152	Assault howitzer	
	StuH JSU-152 (r)	ISU-152	Assault howitzer	

==== Converted ====
Converted self-propelled guns and artillery
Num.	Short designation	Other designations	Type	Converted vehicle
	Pz.Jg. 38(t) für 7.62 cm Pak 36(r)	Marder III (Sd.Kfz. 139)	Tank Destroyer	Pz. 38(t)
	Pz.Jg. 38(t) für 7.5 cm Pak 40/3 Ausf. H	Marder III Ausf. H (Sd.Kfz. 138)	Tank Destroyer	Pz. 38(t)
	Pz.Jg. 38(t) für 7.5 cm Pak 40/3 Ausf. M	Marder III Ausf. M (Sd.Kfz. 138)	Tank Destroyer	Pz. 38(t)
731(e)	2 cm Flak 38 auf Fgst. Bren 731(e)		Self-propelled anti-air gun	Gep. MG-Träger; Bren 731(e)
731(e)	2,5 cm Pak 112(f) auf Sfl. Bren 731(e)		Tank destroyer	Gep. MG-Träger; Bren 731(e)
731(e)	2.8 cm s.PzB. 41 auf Sfl. Bren 731(e)		Tank destroyer	Gep. MG-Träger; Bren 731(e)
731(e)	3.7 cm Pak 36 auf Sfl. Bren 731(e)		Tank destroyer	Gep. MG-Träger; Bren 731(e)
731(e)	4.7 cm Pak 35/36(ö) auf Sfl. Bren 731(e)		Tank destroyer	Gep. MG-Träger; Bren 731(e)
731(e)	7.5 cm FK. 231(f) auf Sfl. Bren 731(e)		Self-propelled gun	Gep. MG-Träger; Bren 731(e)
731(e)	8.8 cm Panzerschreck auf Fgst. Bren 731(e)	Pz.Jg. Bren 731(e)	Tank destroyer	Gep. MG-Träger; Bren 731(e)
731(f)	4.7 cm Pak (t) (Sfl.) auf Fgst. Pz.Kpfw. 35R 731(f)	Pz.Jg. 35R(f)	Tank destroyer	Pz. R35 731(f)
734(f)	Pz.Kpfw. 35H(f) mit 28/32 cm Wurfrahmen		Multiple rocket launcher	Pz. 35H 734(f)
735(f)	Pz.Kpfw. 38H(f) mit 28/32 cm Wurfrahmen		Multiple rocket launcher	Pz. 38H 735(f)
735(f)	7.5 cm Pak 40 auf G.W. 39H(f)	Marder I	Tank destroyer	Pz. 39H 735(f)
735(f)	10.5 cm le.FH. 16 (Sf.) auf G.W. 39H(f)		Self-propelled howitzer	Pz. 39H 735(f)
735(f)	10.5 cm le.FH. 18 (Sf.) auf G.W. 39H(f)		Self-propelled howitzer	Pz. 39H 735(f)
736(e)	7.5 cm Pak 40 auf G.W. Mk.VI 736(e)		Tank destroyer	Pz. Mk.VI 736(e)
736(e)	10.5 cm Le.FH. 16 auf G.W. Mk.VI 736(e)		Self-propelled howitzer	Pz. Mk.VI 736(e)
737(f)	7.5 cm Pak 40 auf G.W. FCM 36(f)	Marder I	Tank destroyer	Pz. FCM 36 737(f)
737(f)	10.5 cm le.FH. 16 (Sf.) auf G.W. FCM 36(f)		Self-propelled howitzer	Pz. FCM 36 737(f)
740(r)	7.5 cm Pak 97/38 auf Pz. 740(r)		Tank destroyer	Pz. T-26C 740(r)
	7.5 cm Pak 40/1 auf Lorraine S.(f)	Marder I (Sd.Kfz. 135)	Tank destroyer	Lorraine S.(f)
	10.5 cm le.FH. 18/4 auf Lorraine S.(f)		Self-propelled howitzer	Lorraine S.(f)
	15 cm s.FH. 13/1 auf Lorraine S.(f)	Marder I (15 cm sFH 13) (Sd.Kfz. 135/1)	Self-propelled howitzer	Lorraine S.(f)

=== Armoured reconnaissance vehicles ===
==== Captured (with number designation) ====
Num.	Short designation	Vehicle	Type	Image	Notes
201(e)	Pz.Sp.Wg. La 201(e)	Lanchester 6×4	Armoured car		
201(f)	Pz.Sp.Wg. Wh 201(f)	White-Laffly; AMD 50	Armoured car		
201(h)	Pz.Sp.Wg. DAF 201(h)	Pantserwagen M39	Armoured car		
201(i)	Pz.Sp.Wg. AB 40 (i)	Autoblindo 40	Armoured car		
201(i)	Pz.Sp.Wg. AB 41 (i)	Autoblindo 41	Armoured car		
202(e)	le. Pz.Sp.Wg. Mk l 202(e)	Daimler Mk I "Dingo"	Scout car		
202(f)	Pz.Sp.Wg. Laf 202(f)	Laffly-Vincennes; AMD 80	Armoured car		
202(h)	Pz.Sp.Wg. L 202(h)	Pantserwagen M38	Armoured car		
202(i)	Pz.Sp.Wg. Lince (i)	Lancia Lince	Scout car		
202(r)	Pz.Sp.Wg. BA 202(r)	BA-20	Armoured car		
203(f)	Pz.Sp.Wg. TOE 203(f)	Panhard; AMD TOE	Armoured car		
203(i)	Pz.Sp.Wg. AB 43 (i)	Autoblindo 43	Armoured car		
203(r)	Pz.Sp.Wg. BA 203(r)	BA-3 / BA-6	Armoured car		
203(r)	Pz.Sp.Wg. BA 203(r)	BA-10	Armoured car		
204(e)	le. Pz.Sp.Wg. Ir 204(e)	Humber "Ironside"	Light armoured car		
204(f)	Pz.Sp.Wg. P 204(f)	Panhard; AMD 35	Armoured car		
205(e)	Pz.Sp.Wg. Mo 205(e)	Morris CS9	Armoured car		
208(a)	Pz.Sp.Wg. M3 209(a)	M3 Scout Car	Armoured car		
209(a)	Pz.Sp.Wg. M3A1 209(a)	M3A1 Scout Car	Armoured car		
209(e)	Pz.Sp.Wg. G 209(e)	Guy Armoured Car	Armoured car		
401(a)	Pz.Sp.Wg. T7 401(a)	T7 half-track	Armoured half-track		
401(f)	Pz.Sp.Wg. Sch 401(f)	Schneider; AMC P 16	Armoured half-track		
701(b)	Pz.Sp.Wg. VCL 701(b)	CLR V.-C.-L. Mod.1934 T.15	Light tank		
701(f)	Pz.Sp.Wg. VM 701(f)	Renault VM	Light cruiser tank		
702(f)	Pz.Sp.Wg. ZT I 702(f)	Renault ZT1	Light cruiser tank		
703(f)	Pz.Sp.Wg. ZT II 703(f)	Renault ZT3	Light cruiser tank		

==== Captured (without number designation) ====
Short designation	Vehicle	Type	Image	Notes
Pz.Sp.Wg. M8 (a)	M8 Greyhound	Armoured car		
Pz.Sp.Wg. 1ZM (i)	Lancia 1ZM	Armoured car		
Pz.Sp.Wg. BA-27 (r)	BA-27	Armoured car		
Pz.Sp.Wg. BA-64 (r)	BA-64	Scout car		
Pz.Sp.Wg. FAI (r)	FAI-M	Armoured car		

==== Modified ====
Modified armoured reconnaissance vehicles
Num.	Short designation	Vehicle	Vehicle Type	Origin	Notes
204(f)	Pz.Sp.Wg. P 204(f) mit 5 cm KwK 38 L/42 Pz.Sp.Wg. P 204(f) mit 5 cm PaK 38 L/60	Panhard AMD 35 (w/ 5 cm KwK 38 L/42) Panhard AMD 35 (w/ 5 cm PaK 38 L/60)	Armoured car	France	
	Pz.Sp.Wg. M8 (a) mit 15mm MG151 Drilling	M8 Greyhound (w/ 15mm MG151 Drilling)	Armoured car	United States	

=== Armoured personnel carriers ===
==== Captured ====
Captured armoured personnel carriers
Num.	Short designation	Vehicle	Vehicle Type	Origin	Notes
250(i)	Gep. M.Trsp.Wg. S37 250(i)	Autoprotetto S37		Italy	
	le. SPW M2 (a)	M2 Half-track		United States	
	m. SPW M3 (a)	M3 Half-track		United States	
	m. SPW M5 (a)	M5 Half-track		United States	
	le. SPW M9 (a)	M9 Half-track		United States	
	Gep. M.Trsp.Wg. 665NM (i)	Fiat 665NM protetto		Italy	

==== Converted ====
Converted armoured personnel carriers
Num.	Short designation	Vehicle	Vehicle Type	Origin	Notes
304(f)	le. SPW U 304(f)	Armoured Unic P107		France	

=== Tracked light carriers ===
==== Captured ====
Number	Short designation	Vehicle	Type	Country	Notes
601(b)	Art.S. VA 601(b)	VCL Utility; Tractor		Belgium ( (United Kingdom) Vickers design)	
630(f)	Gep. Mun.S. UE 630(f) Inf.S. UE 630(f)	Renault UE		France	
630(i)	Gep. K.S. 630(i)	Semovente L40 da 47/32		Italy	
630(r)	Gep. Art.S. 630(r)	T-20 "Komsomolets"		Soviet Union	
730(e) 730(h)	Gep. MG.Tr. CL 730(e) Gep. MG.Tr. CL 730(h)	Carden-Loyd; Mk VI		United Kingdom Netherlands	
731(e)	Gep. MG.Tr. Bren 731(e) Sfl. Bren 731(e)	Bren Gun; Carrier		United Kingdom	
732(e)	Gep. MG.Tr. Bren 732(e)	Armoured; Scout Carrier		United Kingdom	
	Lorraine S. (f)	Lorraine 37L		France	

==== Converted ====
Converted tracked light carriers
Number	Short designation	Vehicle	Vehicle Type	Origin	Notes
735(f)	Art.S. 38H(f)	Hotchkiss H38	Artillery tractor	France	

== United Kingdom ==
- British Marmon-Herrington Armoured Car
- British Marmon–Herrington Humber
- British AEC Dorchester armored bus

== France ==
- Lorraine 37L - Lorraine Schlepper(f)

- Grosser Funk-und Beobachtungspanzer auf Lorraine Schlepper(f)

- Unic P107
  - Leichter Zugkraftwagen U304(f)
  - Leichter Schützenpanzerwagen U304(f)
- French Somua MCG/MCL
  - le.Zgkw. S307(f)
  - Mittlerer gepanzerter Zugkraftwagen S307/303(f)
  - Mittlerer Schützenpanzerwagen S307/303(f)
  - SPW S307/303(f) mit Reihenwerfer
  - 7.5 cm Pak 40 auf m SPW S307/303(f)
  - 8 cm R-Vielfachwerfer auf m.gep.Zgkw. S307/303(f)
  - 5 cm Panzerwerfer 42 auf m.gep Zgkw. S307/303(f)
- Renault UE
  - 3.7 cm Pak 36(Sf) auf Infanterieschlepper UE 630(f)
  - 28/32 cm Wurfrahmen(Sf) auf Infanterieschlepper UE 630(f)

== Others ==
- Spanish AAC1937 (captured while in French service)
- Swedish Landsverk 180/181 (captured while in Danish service)

== Supplementary list ==
German Beutepanzers during WW2
Beutepanzer	Original Tank	Captured From
Pz.Kpfw. 35(t)	Škoda LT vz. 35	Czechoslovakia
Pz.Kpfw. 38(t)	CKD-Praga LT-H	Czechoslovakia
Praga T-33		Czechoslovakia
Pz.Kpfw. T-26C 740(r)	T-26	Soviet Union
T-50		Soviet Union
Pz.Kpfw. 751(r)	T-35	Soviet Union
T-60		Soviet Union
Pz.Kpfw. KW I 756(r)	KV-1	Soviet Union
Pz.Kpfw. KW II 754(r)	KV-2	Soviet Union
Pz.Kpfw. 747(r)	T-34	Soviet Union
IS-2		Soviet Union
BA-10 203 (r)	BA-10	Soviet Union
Artillery Tug 604	Comintern	Soviet Union
Kreuzer Pz.Kpfw. Mk IV 744(e)	Cruiser IV	United Kingdom
Kreuzer Pz.Kpfw. Mk VI 746(e)	Crusader I	United Kingdom
Infanterie Pz.Kpfw. Mk II 748(e)	Matilda II	United Kingdom
Sturmpanzer Churchill	Churchill	United Kingdom
Pz.Jg. Bren 731(e)	British Universal Carrier	United Kingdom
7TP		Poland
wz. 34		Poland
Pz.Kpfw. 35H 734(f)	Hotchkiss H-35	France
Pz.Kpfw. 39H 735(f)	Hotchkiss H-39	France
Pz.Kpfw. B2 740(f)	Renault Char B1	France
Pz.Kpfw. 18R 730(f)	Renault FT	France
Pz.Kpfw. 35R 731(f)	Renault R35	France
Sp.Pz. AB41 201(i)	Autoblindo AB41	Italy
Sd.Kfz 735 (i)	Fiat M13/40	Italy
Pz.Kpfw. P40 737(i)	Fiat P26/40	Italy
Sturmgeschütz M42	Semnovente 75/18	Italy
Pz.Kpfw. M4 748 (a)	M4 Sherman	United States
Pz.Kpfw. M3 747 (a)	M3 Lee	United States
Pz.Kpfw. M3 740 (a)	M3 Stuart	United States

Soviet Beutepanzers during WW2
Beutepanzer	Original Tank	Captured From
Sturmgeschütz III		Germany
T-V	Pz.Kpfw. V Panther	Germany
T-IV	Pz.Kpfw. IV	Germany
T-III	Pz.Kpfw. III	Germany
LT-38 Praga	Pz.Kpfw. 38(t)	Germany
T-1	Pz.Kpfw. I	Germany

Finnish Beutepanzers during WW2
Beutepanzer	Captured From
BT-7	Soviet Union
T-26	Soviet Union
T-28	Soviet Union
T-34	Soviet Union
KV-1	Soviet Union

Romanian Beutepanzers during WW2
Beutepanzer	Captured From
T-40	Soviet Union

American Beutepanzers during WW2
Beutepanzer	Original Tank	Captured From
Sturmgeschütz III		Germany
King Tiger	Sd.Kfz. 182	Germany
Tiger	Sd.Kfz. 181	Germany

British Beutepanzers during WW2
Beutepanzer	Original Tank	Captured From
Panther	Pz.Kpfw. V Panther	Germany

French Beutepanzers during WW2
Beutepanzer	Original Tank	Captured From
Panther	Pz.Kpfw. V Panther	Germany
Tigre	Sd.Kfz. 181	Germany
Panzer IV		Germany

== See also ==
- German designations of foreign artillery in World War II
- German designations of foreign firearms in World War II
