= BA-I =

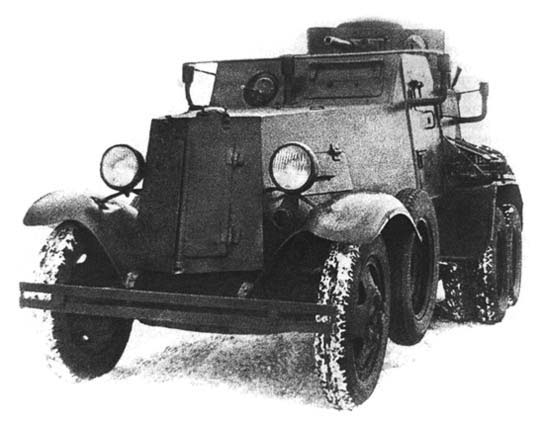
- Type: Armoured car
- Place of origin: Soviet Union

Service history
- Used by: Soviet Union

Production history
- No. built: 82

Specifications
- Mass: 5 tonnes (5.5 short tons)
- Length: 4.8 m (16 ft)
- Width: 2.0 m (6.6 ft)
- Height: 2.4 m (7.9 ft)
- Crew: 3
- Armor: 8 mm
- Main armament: 37mm 7K gun
- Secondary armament: 2x7.62mm DT
- Engine: GAZ-AA; 40 hp (30 kW)
- Power/weight: 8 hp/ton
- Suspension: wheeled
- Operational range: 150 km (93 miles)
- Maximum speed: 63 km/h (39 mph)

The BA-I (sometimes BAI) is a Soviet three-axle armoured car. Only 82 vehicles of this type were built in 1932–1934, nevertheless the design initiated a series of heavy armoured cars of Izhorskij plant: BA-3, BA-6, BA-9, and BA-10. Some vehicles were used in World War II, despite being obsolete at the time.

== Background ==
In 1931, the first Soviet 6x4 chassis was created, a design based on adding Timken tandem rear axles to the American Ford AA chassis, and because of that called Ford-Timken. This immediately initiated the development of armoured cars. By the end of the year assembly was taking place at the plant "Gudok Oktyabrya" in Kanavin, near Nizhniy Novgorod. In autumn of the same year at the Repair Base of Nº2 in Moscow hull from the BA-27 armoured car was first attached to the new chassis. About 20 such cars were built, having the designation BA-27M. At the same time, and with the same chassis, but at the Izhorskij plant, several dozen D-13 armoured cars were built, developed by N. I. Dyrenkov.

In 1932, engineer P. N. Syachentov, known for his development of the artillery, designed the universal armoured car BAD-2, which was both amphibious and capable of driving the railroad track. A single copy was built, but not accepted for manufacturing.

== Design ==
The body and the layout of the components and assemblies of the armored car bear great similarity to the American armored car T4 (M1), released in 1931.

In 1932, at the Izhorskij plant, the armoured car BA-I (I stands for Izhorskij) was developed by A. D. Kuzmin. In some publications the name of this machine is written together - BAI. It used the same triaxial Ford-Timken chassis as its predecessors.

The hull was welded together - an advanced technology for the time. Due to the "stepped" form of the roof on the hull it was possible to place turret lower, substantially reducing the overall height of combat vehicle. In the cylindrical welded turret, there was a 37 mm gun with 34 rounds (similarly to earlier BA-27 armored car), and a DT machine gun on a separate ball mount. The second DT was placed in the frontal sheet to the right of the driver. There were doors in the hull and in the rear for crew evacuation.

An interesting idea that was borrowed from the earlier D-13 armoured car was mounting of spare wheels just next to the front wheels and only slightly higher. These helped when crossing trenches and rugged terrain. An innovation was the possibility to convert vehicle to a half-track by fitting auxiliary ("Overall") tracks to the rear pair of dual tandem wheels. Additionally some vehicles were equipped with radio. All three of these ideas were subsequently used in all succeeding designs, including the BA-10.

A version has been developed using an improved GAZ-AAA chassis. Also a prototype railway BA-IZD variant was created, but was not accepted for production.
