= AAC-1937 =

AAC-1937 (Autoametralladora-cañón Chevrolet modelo 1937)
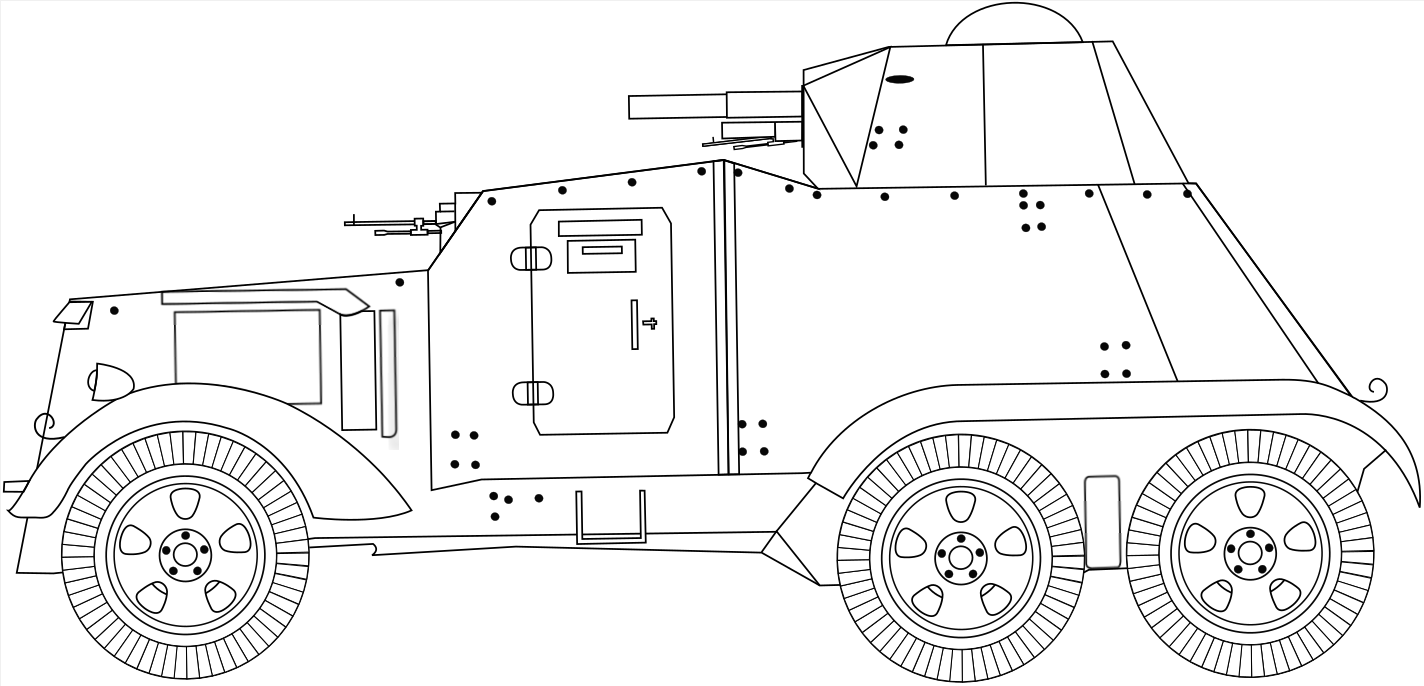
- A ACC-1937 drawing, with a 37mm Puteaux cannon
- Type: Armoured car
- Place of origin: Spanish Republic

Service history
- Used by: Second Spanish Republic; Francoist Spain; French Third Republic; Nazi Germany
- Wars: Spanish Civil War; World War II

Production history
- Designer: War Industry Commission in Catalonia
- Designed: 1937
- Manufacturer: Hispano-Suiza
- Produced: 1937–1938
- No. built: 60-90

Specifications
- Mass: 4,354 t
- Length: 4.4 m
- Width: 2.25 m
- Height: 2.4 m
- Crew: 4 (gunner, driver, machine gunner and commandant)
- Armor: 8 mm
- Main armament: 1x37mm Puteaux SA 18 cannon, a T-26B or BA-6 turret, a HMG
- Secondary armament: 1×7.92 hull machine gun
- Engine: Chevrolet OHV 216.5-ci (gasoline motor of 6 cylinder); 78 hp at 3,200 revolutions per minute
- Suspension: wheeled 6x4
- Operational range: 250 km in road
- Maximum speed: 62 km/h

The AAC-1937, which means Autoametralladora-cañón Chevrolet modelo 1937, also known as Chevrolet 1937, was an armoured car developed and built by loyalist forces during the Spanish Civil War in Catalonia. After the dismantling of the War Industry Commission of Catalonia, the Subsecretary of Weapons and Ammunitions of Spain contracted Soviet engineers to build a new armoured vehicle. They took the BA-6 as a basis for the new vehicle, and built a very similar vehicle, the AAC-1937 in the Hispano-Suiza factory in Barcelona, using a chassis from General Motors Peninsular.

With a total run of between 60 and 90 units, the AAC-1937 fought in the Spanish Civil War in the east: in the Aragon offensive and in the Catalonia offensive.

After the fall of Catalonia (also known as La retirada), the AAC-1937 went to the armies of France and Spain. With the start of WW2 these vehicles saw use in the Battle of France and the Germans captured some of them. Later they used them in the Eastern Front, where they were destroyed by the Soviets during the first months of the conflict.

== Antecedents ==
After the First World War, Spain acquired 12 Renault FT-17 and 6 Schneider CA1 from France. In 1921, those tanks were sent to Morocco, where they participated in their first battle on 17 March 1922, however, the results were not deemed satisfactory. As they advanced ahead of the infantry they were surrounded and isolated and after some of their machine guns were blocked, they suffered heavy losses. After the first battle, they gave support in the Rif War, with success during the Alhucemas landing, a decisive victory that led to their return to Spain.

The Moroccan campaign demonstrated the importance of these new weapons and encouraged the acquisition of more tanks, like the Fiat 3000 from the Kingdom of Italy in 1924, and the production of a national tank in 1925, the Trubia A4. The Sanjuanada of 1926 meant that tanks, usually associated with the artillery officers that participated in the coup d'état, lost the favour of the administration and the projects for national production of armoured vehicles were cancelled.

The tanks that were still operative before the start of the Spanish Civil War were assigned to two units: the Regimiento Ligero de Carros de Combate (LCC) número 1, stationed near Madrid, and the Regimiento LCC número 2, near Saragossa.

=== Beginnings ===
In Catalonia, after the July 1936 military uprising in Barcelona, the workers decided to assist in the war effort by producing weapons, including tanks.

After the initial chaos and starting from scratch, the War Industry Commission in Catalonia was in charge of managing the production of the new armoured vehicle. During that period they built several experimental vehicles with a wide variety of uses and performances.

After the May Days, the Republican Government took charge of the weapons and ammunition industries of all the Republican territories, including Catalan. Also, the Italian and German navies controlled most of the naval routes to the Iberian Peninsula and because of that, the Soviet Union wasn't able to send resources via sea. These reasons pushed the Second Spanish Republic into building a national tank or armoured vehicle.

The Spanish sub-secretary of weapons, with the help of Soviet engineers, started the development of a new heavy armoured vehicle in April 1937, taking the BA-6 as a reference. The most famous vehicle was the AAC-1937, which was based on the chassis of the Chevrolet SD 1937 truck from General Motors Peninsular, produced in Barcelona.

The problem was that the Chevy SD 1937 only had 2 axles, and the extra weight added by the armour made it too unstable. To fix it, they added axles from Soviet GAZ trucks that were copies of American designs. The outcome was that the AAC-1937 was very similar to the BA-6, but was more agile thanks to a more powerful engine.

== Design ==
The armour was made in the blast furnace of Sagunt, in Valencia. Another armoured car similar to the BA-20 was also produced there, the UNL-35. The vehicle was protected by welded steel sheets, similar to Soviet vehicles of the time. The biggest differences to the BA-6 were the doors to access the engine, the wheels and the mudguard.

The AAC-1937 usually had a crew of four operators: driver, commander, gunner and driver helper, who used the hull machine gun. There were several variations in weaponry and turret configuration:

- One machine gun equipped with his own turret: Maxim machine gun, DT machine gun, MG 13
- Recovered turret form T-26, BT-5 and BA-6 tanks
- One cannon Puteaux SA 18 of 37 mm, used from the Renault FT-17 tanks, with a coaxial machine gun

The weapons were diverse mainly because of limited availability. The vehicles started being delivered from the factory in April 1937. The production rate was four tanks a month until March 1938, when the nationalist forces split the Republican territory in two, isolating Catalonia from their vital steel supply for the production of tanks. In total, there were between 60 and 90 AAC-1937 built.

== In combat ==
The AAC-1937 was used in the Spanish Civil War and in the Second World War. They were also used in the Spanish Army in the Francoist Spain period until the decade of 1950 in cavalry units.

=== Spanish Civil War ===
The first battle of the AAC-1937 was in the May Days, alongside UNL-35 armoured cars. It was later used by the 1st Armoured Division (in Catalonia) and the 2nd Armoured Division (in the South Centre). During the war, at least 30 of these vehicles were captured by the nationalist forces, changing their weapons to MG 13 machine guns.

After the Battle of the Ebro, where the Franco forces destroyed 17 AAC-1937 and captured 18, all the remaining AAC-1937 that were still in Catalonia were pulled back to the French border, where they were given to the French border forces.

=== Second World War ===
The French used the AAC-1937, and during the Battle of France they were used with low casualties, though 20 were captured by troops from Nazi Germany as Beutepanzer. Those vehicles were modified with the installation of new German weapons, changing the Puteaux SA 18 37 mm cannon for a MG 34 or MG 42, changing its role to use them as troops transport, or as a Self-propelled anti-aircraft weapon using 2 MG 34 or MG 42 with an AA mount.

Once in German hands, the AAC-1937 were used in Operation Barbarossa. The photographic references show that they were even used in the Battle of Moscow, and several were destroyed by the Red Army.

== See also ==
- Trubia A4
- Trubia Naval
- Military light utility vehicle
- Lancia 1ZM
- List of armoured fighting vehicles by country

== Bibliography ==
- Manrique, José María; Molina, Lucas (2006). Las armas de la Guerra Civil española (in Spanish). Madrid: La esfera de los libros. ISBN 84-9734-475-8.
- Zaloga, Steven J (2010). Spanish Civil War tanks. The proving ground for Blitzkrieg. New Vanguard nº 170. Great Britain: Osprey Publishing. ISBN 978-1-84603-512-8.
