= M1 armored car =

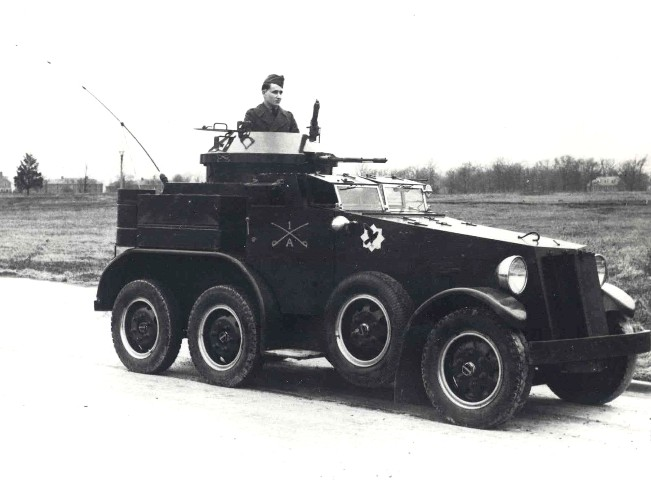
- M1 armored car
- Type: Armored car
- Place of origin: United States

Production history
- Designer: James Cunningham
- No. built: 12

Specifications
- Crew: 4
- Main armament: .50 (12.7 mm) M1921
- Secondary armament: 2 or 3 x .30 (7.62 mm) machine guns
- Engine: 8-cylinder gasoline
- Suspension: wheels, 4X6
- Operational range: 250 miles
- Maximum speed: 55 MPH

The M1 armored car was a four-wheel drive American armored car tested by the United States Army Ordnance Department in 1931 and briefly in 1932. It was built by James Cunningham, Son and Company of Rochester, New York, and during testing demarcated as the Model T4.

== History ==
Two T4s were built to Ordnance Department specifications by Cunningham Motors, Rochester, New York. Subsequent ones were built by Rock Island Arsenal

Two T4 test vehicles were built in 1931 and tested until 1934, when they were standardized as the M1. Some sources indicate an additional ten T4s may have been built before standardization- Army records list only 12 M1 cars being accepted, though it is unclear if these are all new built vehicles or if the number includes the ones originally built as T4s. If the records refer to two different orders, the maximum number built for each type is still only twelve T4 and twelve M1. All vehicles of both designations are believed to have been issued to the First Cavalry Regiment for testing and trials. They are all believed to have been removed from service prior to 1939.

It was powered by an eight-cylinder gasoline engine, had a crew of four and was armed with a maximum of one .50-inch M1921 permanently mounted in the turret and two "backup" .30-inch machine guns mounted in fore and aft firing ports. The turret also had fittings for mounting one of the machine guns(though one source states two) for anti-aircraft use, though this was never tested by the Army. It could reach a speed of 55 mph (89 km/h) on paved surfaces, and had an estimated cruising range on roads of approximately 250 miles (400 km).

Of the six wheels the two rear axles were powered, while the front axle was only used for steering. Though it had respectable -for the 1930s- performance on paved and improved surfaces, the lack of powered front wheels and its length combined to give it very poor off-road performance, especially in mud and snow. The spare wheels were mounted on free-spinning "stub axles" in an effort to keep it from bottoming out the chassis ("bellying"), but they did nothing to help it get unstuck.

Although the vehicle itself was not adopted for mass production, it showed enough benefits over continued use of the horse to warrant further study and experimentation at mechanizing the U.S. Cavalry through the rest of the 1930s and into the early 1940s. Lessons learned in its trials also led to the design and adoption of more successful armored cars, such as the T17 Staghound and M8 Greyhound. The lessons learned about its cross country performance were a factor in the eventual adoption of light tanks and half-tracks for many mechanized cavalry and recon units in the early 1940s.

== See also ==
- List of U.S. military vehicles by supply catalog designation (SNL G-29)
- List of U.S. military vehicles by model number
- BA-I (Soviet armoured car)
