= BA-3/6 =

BA-3 and BA-6
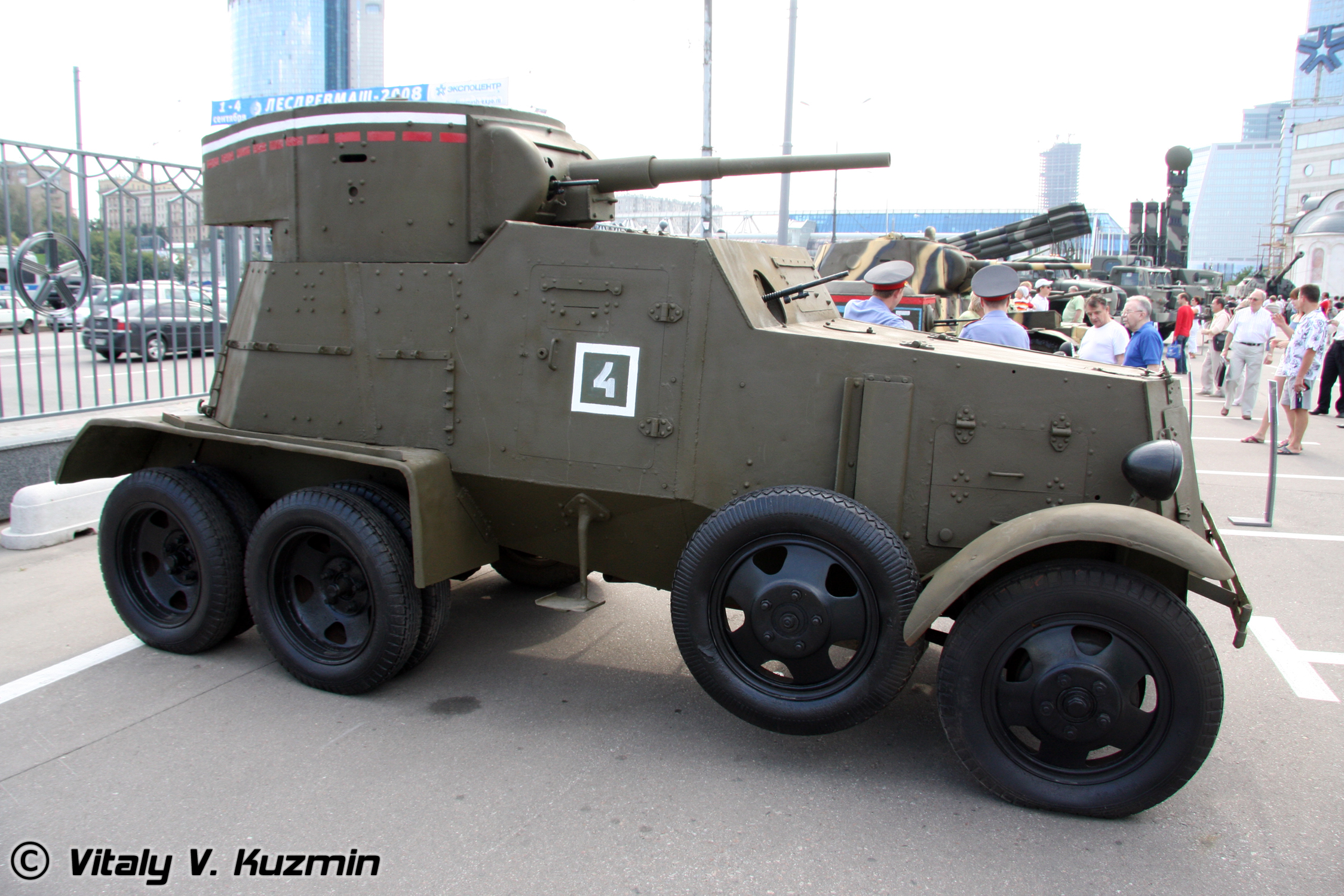
- BA-6
- Type: Armored car
- Place of origin: Soviet Union; Mongolia

Service history
- Used by: Soviet Union; Second Spanish Republic; Turkey; Finland (captured)

Production history
- No. built: 221 BA-3 (including 1 BA-3ZhD, 431 BA-6 (including 21 BA-6ZhD)

Specifications
- Mass: BA-3: 5.82 t BA-6: 5.10 t
- Length: 4.65 m (15.3 ft)
- Width: 2.10 m (6.9 ft)
- Height: 2.20 m (7.2 ft)
- Crew: 4
- Armor: 15 mm turret, 9 mm hull
- Main armament: 45 mm gun 20-K (60 rounds)
- Secondary armament: 2×7.62 mm DT
- Engine: 4-cylinder petrol GAZ-A; 40 hp (30 kW)
- Power/weight: 7-8 hp/tonne
- Suspension: wheeled 6x4
- Operational range: BA-3: 260 km (160 miles); BA-6: 200 km (120 miles)
- Maximum speed: BA-3: 63 km/h (39 mph); BA-6: 55 km/h (34 mph)

The BA-3 (Russian: Broneavtomobil 3) was a heavy armored car developed in the Soviet Union in 1933, followed by a slightly changed model BA-6 in 1936. Both were based mostly on BA-I, the most important development being the new turret, same as in the T-26 m 1933 and BT-5 tanks, and also equipped with the 45 mm main gun.

221 BA-3 cars were built at the Izhorskij and Vyksunskij factories, until production ended in 1935. BA-6 followed with 386 cars produced between 1936 and 1938 in Izhorskij factory. Most BA-3 production was based on the Ford-Timken chassis, a 6×4 modification of the US Ford AA 4×2 truck, but the last batch was built on the Russian version of the same chassis - GAZ-AAA, and continued to be used in the BA-6. The biggest limitation of the BA-3 was the mobility, limited to roads or very hard ground, the result of unnecessarily large weight. The innovation that slightly improved mobility was the auxiliary ("Overall") tracks that could be fitted onto the rear tandem wheels, converting the car to a half-track.

The BA-3 is externally very similar to the BA-6; the BA-3 had a door in the rear of the hull that was not present in the BA-6. A more important improvement of the BA-6 was the new GK tires, filled with sponge (porous rubber), and thus much less vulnerable to small-caliber fire. On the downside, the tires reduced both the speed and range of the vehicle, despite it having somewhat thinner armor. BA-3/6 cars were superseded by the BA-10 model. All cars of this series were very heavily armed for the era; they could knock out other vehicles with ease, including tanks. However, their thin armor made them vulnerable to heavy machine gun fire and small caliber cannon fire.

A prototype railway BA-3ZhD variant was created in 1936, but was not accepted for production. The BA-6ZhD was produced in limited numbers.

Some 60 BA-6 cars were delivered to Turkey in 1934. The BA-3/6 were used in combat in the Spanish Civil War, against the Japanese in the Battle of Khalkhyn Gol, in the Finnish Winter War, and against the Germans in the early stages of the Eastern Front. The German Army used a few AAC-1937, Spanish-built six-wheeled armored cars that were close copies of the BA-3/6 series. Later in the war, the BA-3/6/10 were replaced in the Red Army's heavy scout vehicle role by light tanks, such as the T-60 and T-70.

A few captured BA-3 cars were used by the Finnish army under the designation BAF A (sometimes also BA-32-1), and captured BA-6 cars under the designation BAF B.

== Variants ==
The BA-3 ZhD and BA-6 ZhD were designations for BA-3 & BA-6 cars that had been fitted with a rail kit consisting of hydraulic jacks and six railroad wheels. Limited numbers were produced.

The BA-6M, built in 1937-1938, weighed 4800 kg and featured a 10mm thick welded, conical turret. A 71-TK-1 radio and 50 hp GAZ-M engine were installed

The BA-9 was a lightened (4,300 kg) vehicle based on the BA-6M, built in 1936. The 20K gun was replaced by a 12.7mm DK machine gun (early version of the DShK) and a 7.62 Degtyaryov machine gun was installed in the hull. 100 were ordered, but production was dropped after two prototypes were completed due to the lack of DK machine guns. One prototype was sent to Moscow and the other to Leningrad.

The BAZ was an experimental amphibious version of the BA-3. The welded hull was shaped like a boat and two sponsons were placed in the front. Two 389 cm brass screws were installed for use in water.

== Operators ==
- Turkey - 34 BA-3 66 BA-6 Armoured Cars [1934-1940?].
