= BAD-2 =

Armoured car

- Type: Armoured Car
- Place of origin: Soviet Union

Production history
- Designer: P. N. Syachentov
- Manufacturer: Izhorskiye Zavody
- Produced: 1932
- No. built: 1

Specifications
- Mass: 4600 kg
- Crew: 4
- Armor: Max. 6 mm
- Main armament: 37 mm B-3 tank gun
- Secondary armament: 2 x 7.62 mm DT machine guns
- Engine: GAZ-AA Engine; 40 hp (30 kW)
- Maximum speed: 50 km/h (31 mph) (road); 5 km/h (3.1 mph) (water)

BAD-2 was a Soviet experimental amphibious armored car, that could be also converted to run on railroad tracks (see draisine). The changing for rail mode took 30 minutes. Only one prototype was built in 1932, designed by engineer P. N. Syachentov.

== Dimensions ==
The BAD-2 armored vehicle, weighs 4.6 tons, and is about 5.5 meters long, about 2 meters wide, and about 2.2 meters high.

== Conversion ==
The BAD-2 had a set of special rail road wheels used on the railway. It takes about half an hour to replace all the wheels. After completion, the BAD-2 can be used as a light rail armored vehicle. Rubber tracks can also be installed on the rear wheels of the armored vehicle to transform into a half-track vehicle to enhance its off-road capability.

== Turret ==
Behind the engine compartment is the higher crew compartment. The front left is the driver's position. In the passenger seat is a 7.62 mm DT heading machine gun, which is controlled by the machine gunner. Towards the rear center is a 37 mm gun rotating turret. This single-person turret, pre contained 60 rounds of ammunition out of the 3000 it can carry in total along the inside of the turret on racks. Along with another DT turret installed in the lower rear portion of the body. However, due to the structure of the BAD-2, the turrets can only cover most of the rear.

== Speed ==
The maximum road speed is 50 kilometers per hour. Maximum railway speed is 65 kilometers per hour. Maximum water speed is about 5 kilometers per hour.
