= Semovente da 105/25 =

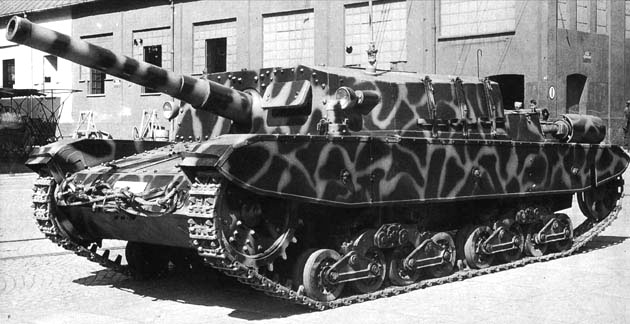
- Type: Self-propelled gun
- Place of origin: Italy

Service history
- In service: 1943–1945
- Used by: Italy; Nazi Germany; Italian Social Republic
- Wars: World War II

Production history
- Manufacturer: Ansaldo
- Produced: 1943 – 1945
- No. built: 121 (30 before the armistice and 91 afterwards)

Specifications
- Mass: 15.8 tonnes (34,833 lbs)
- Length: 5.1 m (16 ft 9 in)
- Width: 2.4 m (7 ft 10 in)
- Height: 1.75 m (5 ft 9 in)
- Crew: 3 (commander/gunner, driver, loader/radio operator)
- Armour: Front: 75 mm (2.95 in)
- Main armament: 105 mm (4.13 in) L/25 with 48 rounds
- Secondary armament: 8 mm Breda 38 machine gun with 864 rounds
- Engine: SPA 15TB M42 petrol V8 water cooled 192 hp/2,400 rpm
- Suspension: vertical volute spring
- Operational range: 180 km (112 miles)
- Maximum speed: 35 km/h (22 mph)

The Ansaldo 105/25 M43, also known as Semovente 105/25, was an Italian self-propelled gun used during World War II and designed by Ansaldo. It was the most powerful self-propelled gun built by Italy in numbers during World War II.

== History ==
The development of a self-propelled gun with high firepower was initiated during 1942 in parallel by Odera-Terni-Orlando (OTO) and Ansaldo. OTO proposed the installation of a 105/25 gun on the hull of a P26/40 tank. Ansaldo, for its part, proposed to use the hull of the Semovente M42 already in production and was therefore able to present, on 28 February 1943, its prototype to the Centro Studi della Motorizzazione while the OTO model was still in development.

The production of the Ansaldo proposal was therefore approved by the Royal Italian Army. In the final version, with improved hull and the 105/25 gun, it was adopted on April 2, 1943 as the self-propelled M43 105/25, Bassotto ("Dachshund"). The first units to be equipped with the Bassotto were the DCI and DCII groups of the 235th Semoventi Artillery Regiment of the 135ª Armored Division "Ariete II". Each group received twelve units, which were used in the defense of Rome in the days following the armistice of Cassibile that went into effect on 8 and 9 September 1943. They acquitted themselves well in combat.

Following the Italian surrender, the Germans, who regarded the Semovente 105/25 "Bassotto" as a very good vehicle, captured them and built an additional 91 units, renamed StuG M43 mit 105/25 853 (i) and used them against the Anglo-American forces.

The 105/25 cannon was also used in bunkers in the defensive fortifications of the Vallo Alpino.

== Features ==
The Bassotto, modeled on the general design of the M40 and M41 predecessors, consisted of one M43 hull, i.e. the hull of a M15/42 tank widened and lowered, with redesigned front and side plates that were welded instead of bolted. On the hull was placed a fixed casemate bolted and welded with an Ansaldo 105/25 howitzer, with traverse and elevation up to 34 ° -12 ° to + 22 °.

The main armament was complemented with a Breda 38 8 mm machine gun for close and anti-aircraft defense operated by the commander / gunner, while the radio operator had one Magneti Marelli radio RF1 CA.

== Versions ==
=== Semovente M43 da 75/34 ===
Designed by Ansaldo, this version mounted the 75/34 Mod. S.F. gun used on the semovente 75/34 M42M. It was designated StuG M43 mit 75/34 (851) (i) by the Germans. It was manufactured in only twenty-three and twenty-nine units in 1944 and was only employed by the German army.

=== Semovente M43 da 75/46 ===
Developed by Ansaldo in 1944 and designated StuG M43 mit 75/46 (852) (i) by the Germans, it was a tank destroyer version based on heavily modified hull of M.43 105/25. It was the last tank destroyer manufactured in Italy after the armistice, as well as being the first Italian AFV with a predominantly welded construction and not bolted. Using alternative materials (concrete reinforced with gravel) was also considered for integration with the armor, but instead it was built conventionally with thicker armor (up front 100 mm) compared to other tanks produced in Italy.

The armament consisted of a re-purposed antiaircraft gun, the 75/46 C.A. Mod. 1934 / Mod. 40, with a load of forty two rounds. Designers did not have time to develop a specialized antitank round, so they employed a normal delayed fuze to improve the penetration capability. The gun laying was manual on a spherical support and allows elevation from -12 ° to + 22 ° and a 34 ° lateral tilt. The armament also included a Breda 38 machine gun with 500 rounds, which was in practice often replaced by a MG 42 with a greater number of rounds. The crew was limited to just three people, leaving a heavy load to the commander acting as gunner, while the loader was also gunner / radio operator. The Semovente was produced in eleven units (eight in 1943, three in 1944) and only used by the German army.One or two additional vehicles were incomplete or perhaps were completed after the liberation of Italy that prevented the restart of the manufacture planned for 1945.

== Gallery ==
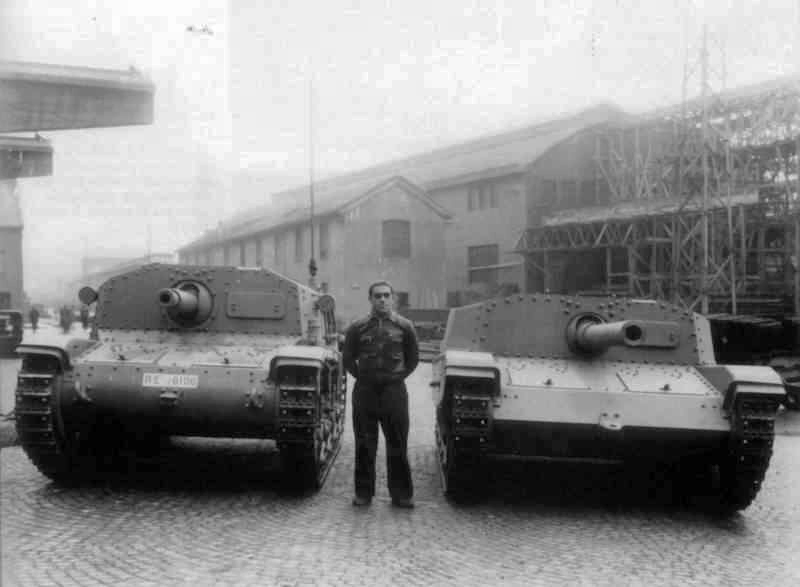
Photo showing how the hull of the M43 105/25 (on the right) was wider and lower than that of the M42 (left).

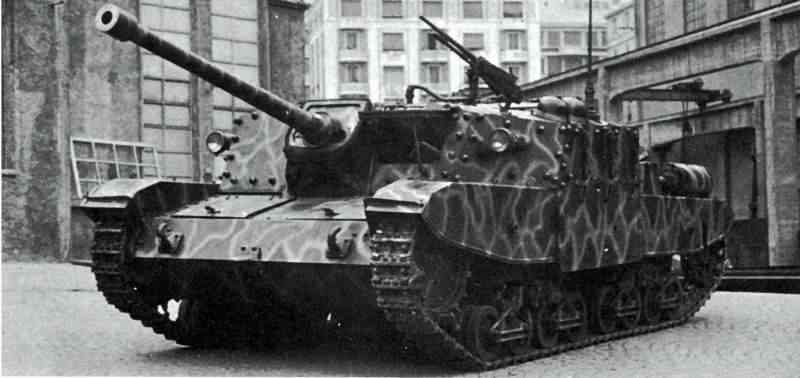
An M43 75/46.

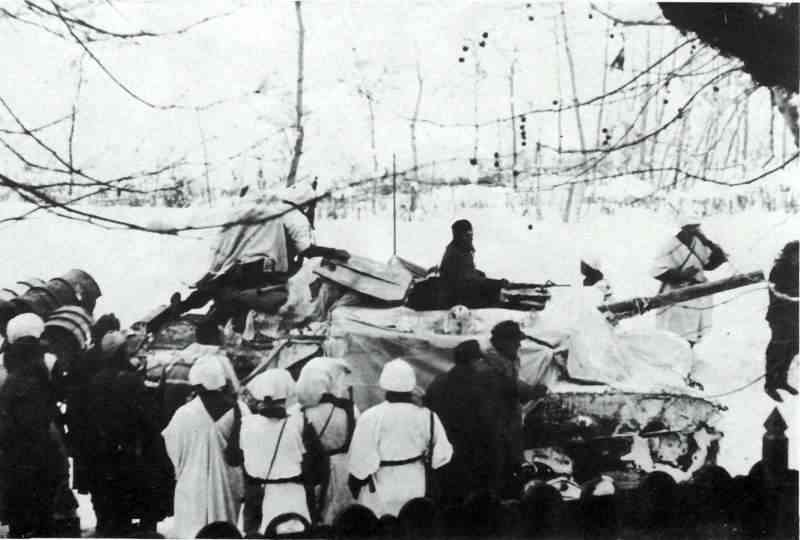
An M43 75/34.

== See also ==
- Semovente da 75/18
- Semovente da 75/34
- Semovente da 75/46
