= BA-10 =

Soviet armored car

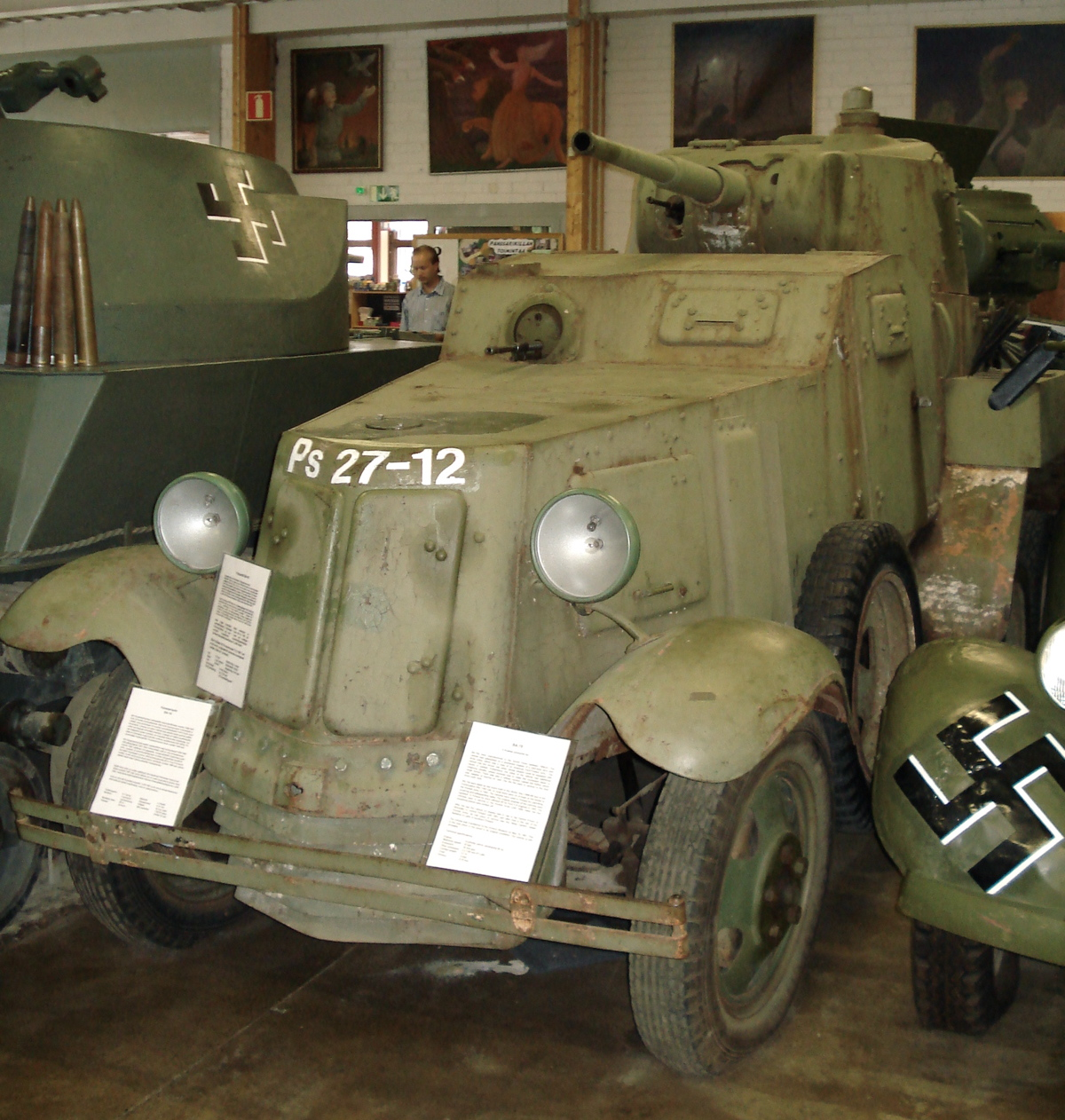
- BA-10M armored car, displayed in Parola Tank Museum
- Type: Armored car
- Place of origin: Soviet Union

Service history
- Used by: Soviet Union; Manchukuo (captured); Finland (captured); Nazi Germany (captured); Sweden (ex-Finnish)

Production history
- No. built: 3311

Specifications
- Mass: 5.14 tonnes (5.67 short tons)
- Length: 4.65 m (15.3 ft)
- Width: 2.00 m (6.56 ft)
- Height: 2.20 m (7.2 ft)
- Crew: 4
- Armor: 6–15 mm
- Main armament: 45 mm gun 20-K (49 rounds)
- Secondary armament: 2× 7.62 DT machine guns (2079 rounds).
- Engine: GAZ-MM; 50 hp (37 kW)
- Power/weight: 10 hp/tonne
- Suspension: wheeled
- Operational range: 300 km (190 miles)
- Maximum speed: 53 km/h (33 mph)

The BA-10 (Russian: Броневой автомобиль 10 модель (БА-10), romanized: Bronevoy avtomobil' 10 model', lit. 'Armoured car model 10') was an armored car developed in the Soviet Union in 1938 and produced through 1941. It was the most produced Soviet pre-1941 heavy armored car – 3311 were built in three versions. These versions were the BA-10, the BA-10M (improved version with new radio), and the BA-10ZhD (equipped for dual railway/road use). The basic BA-10 design was developed from the BA-3 and BA-6 heavy armored cars. It had an improved GAZ-AAA chassis and improved armor (up to 15mm at front and turret). It was intended that the BA-10 would be replaced in 1941 by the BA-11 with diesel engine and more sophisticated armor design, but the outbreak of war prevented BA-11 production. The BA-10 was in Red Army service until 1945. Significant numbers of captured BA-10s were used by Finland (at least 24, 3 of which were sold to Sweden), Germany and other Axis powers in Europe.

== Development ==
During the late 1930s, Soviet armoured fighting vehicle designers incorporated sloped armor into all their new designs, and redesigned some existing vehicles to take advantage of it. The BA-10 used a slightly smaller, better-sloped armor layout than that of the BA-6, thus improving protection while saving weight. The greater engine power (50 hp (37 kW), compared to 40 hp (30 kW) on the BA-6) made the vehicle more reliable.

Like its predecessors, the BA-10 could be converted to a half-track by fitting auxiliary tracks to the rear pair of dual tandem wheels. On early BA-10s, these tracks were stowed strapped on top of the fenders. Later vehicles had an enclosed stowage box for the tracks in the same location. The tracks were often fitted when the vehicle needed to move across snow or soft ground.

== In action ==
The BA-10 first saw action against the Japanese in Manchuria at the Battle of Khalkhin Gol in 1939. Some were captured and later used by the Manchukuo. It was involved in all the Soviet Union's subsequent military operations and campaigns of 1939-1940.

During World War II the BA-10 was used against the Germans on the Eastern Front, but was rarely seen after the winter of 1941–42. Later in the war, the heavy scouting role was taken over by light tanks such as the T-60 and T-70. A few BA-10s were seen as late as 1943 on the Leningrad front.

Large numbers of captured BA-10s were used by Axis powers in Europe. In May 1945 a few BA-10s of ROA fought alongside the defenders of the Prague uprising.

== Gallery ==
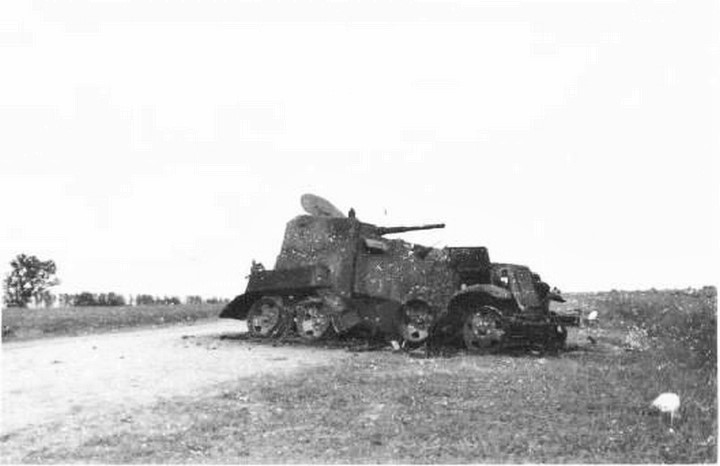
Destroyed BA-10 after Khalkhin Gol, 1939

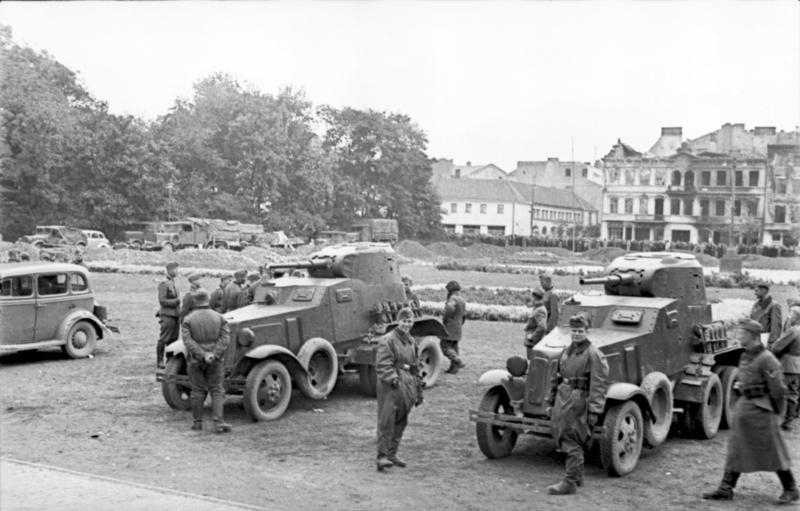
Soviet officers and BA-10s in Lublin, Poland, 1939

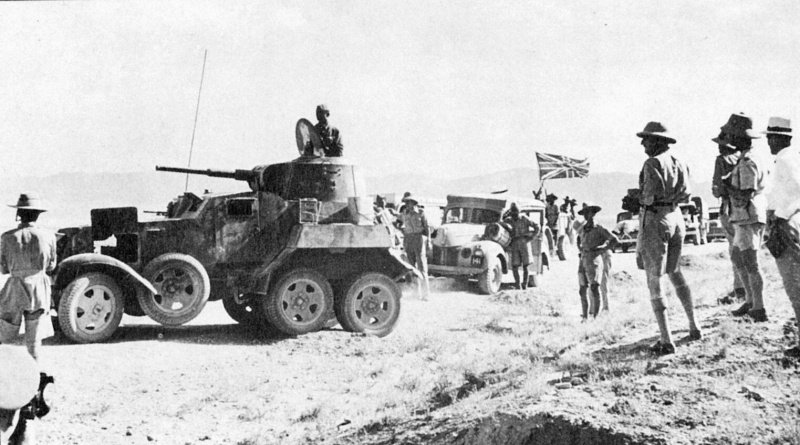
A BA-10 escorting British supply convoy in Iran, September-October 1941

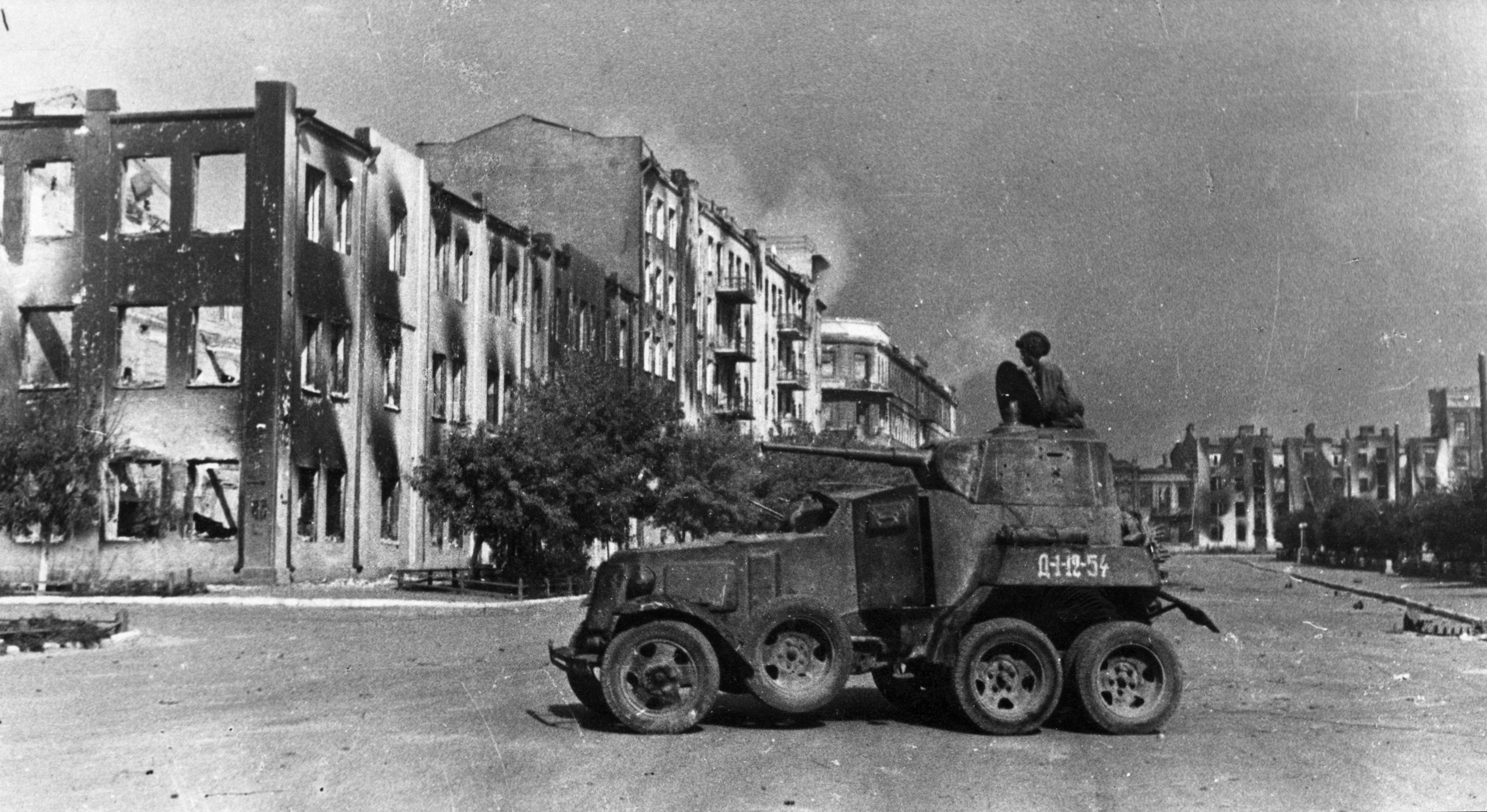
A BA-10 in Stalingrad, 1942
